= Demon Hunter discography =

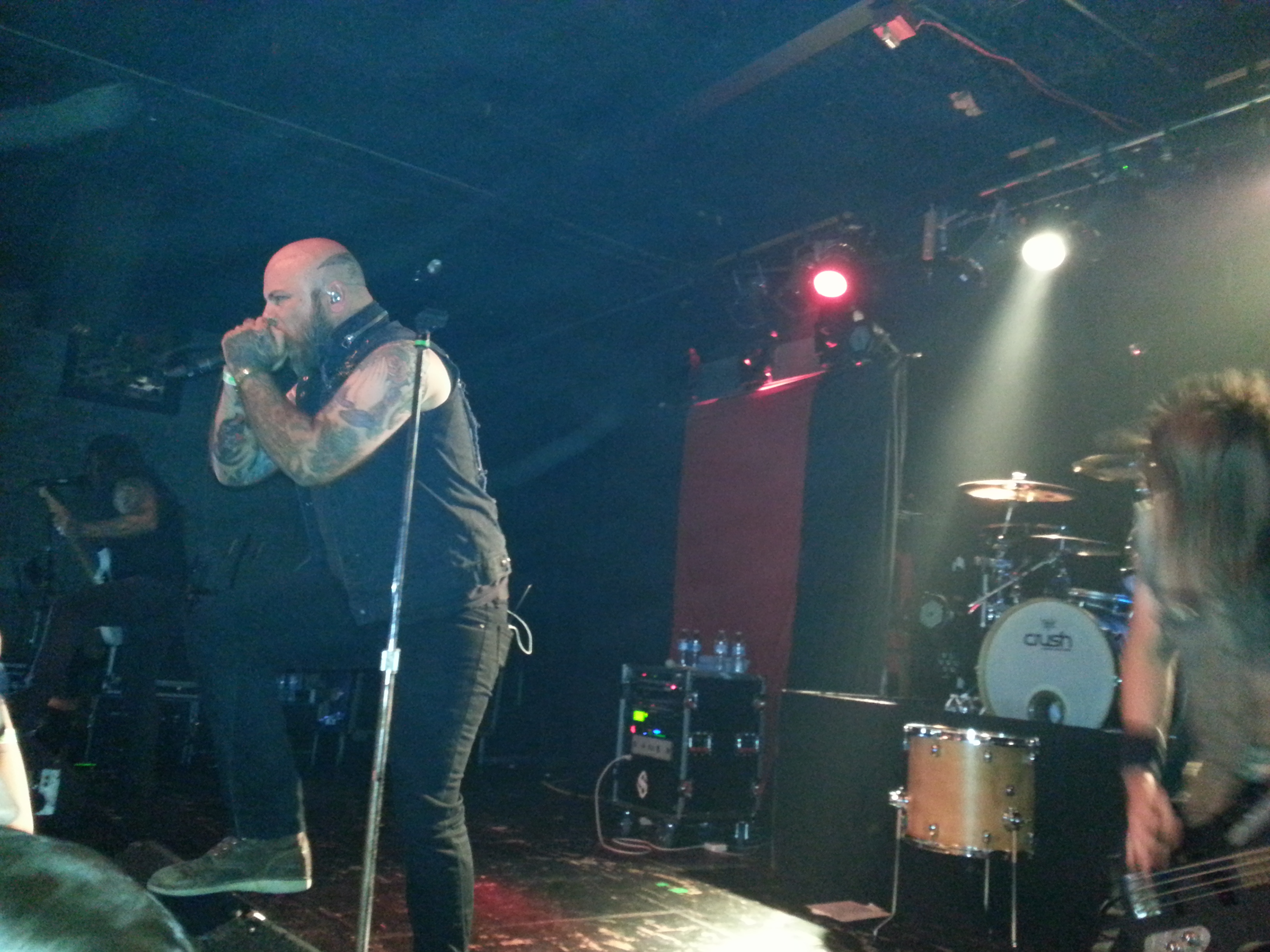
- Studio albums: 12
- Live albums: 2
- Compilation albums: 3
- Singles: 43
- Music videos: 19

The following is a comprehensive list for the discography of Demon Hunter, is an American Christian metal band. The band's discography consists of 12 studio albums, one live album, one documentary soundtrack album, two compilation albums, an album of reworked ballads, 43 singles and 19 music videos.

== Studio albums ==
List of studio albums, with selected chart positions, sales figures and certifications
Title	Album details	Peak chart positions					Sales	Certifications
Title	Album details	US	US Christ.	US Rock	US Hard Rock	US Heat.	Sales	Certifications
Demon Hunter	Released: October 22, 2002; Label: Solid State; Formats: CD	—	—	—	—	—		
Summer of Darkness	Released: May 4, 2004; Label: Solid State; Formats: CD, LP	—	23	—	—	22	US: 100.000	
The Triptych	Released: October 25, 2005; Label: Solid State; Formats: CD, LP	136	10	—	—	1	US: 150.000	
Storm the Gates of Hell	Released: November 6, 2007; Label: Solid State; Formats: CD, LP	85	3	25	10	—	US: 100.000	
The World Is a Thorn	Released: March 9, 2010; Label: Solid State; Formats: CD	39	2	6	2	—		
True Defiance	Released: April 10, 2012; Label: Solid State; Formats: CD, LP, digital download	36	2	14	3	—		
Extremist	Released: March 18, 2014; Label: Solid State; Formats: CD, LP, digital download	16	2	5	2	—		
Outlive	Released: March 31, 2017; Label: Solid State; Formats: CD, LP, digital download	25	2	2	2	—	US: 18,000	
War	Released: March 1, 2019; Label: Solid State; Formats: CD. LP, cassette, digital download	55	2	8	4	—		
Peace	Released: March 1, 2019; Label: Solid State; Formats: CD, LP, cassette, digital download	61	3	11	5	—		
Exile	Released: October 28, 2022; Label: Weapons MFG; Formats: CD, LP, digital download, streaming	200	2	25	11	—		
There Was a Light Here	Released: September 12, 2025; Label: Weapons MFG; Formats: CD, LP, digital download, streaming	—	9	—	—	—		

=== Compilations, Soundtrack, Live, Misc. ===
- Double Take: Demon Hunter (collects the first two albums) 2007
- Music from the Film 45 Days (score composed for the band's 45 Days documentary) 2008
- Live in Nashville (audio of the concert featured on the 45 Days DVD) 2009
- Death, a Destination (collects the first three albums) 2011
- Songs of Death and Resurrection (reworked versions of their ballads) 2021

== Singles ==
Song	Year	Peak chart positions			Album
Song	Year	US Christ.	Christian Digital	Christian Rock	Album
"Infected"	2002	—	—	—	Demon Hunter
"Through the Black"	2002	—	—	—	Demon Hunter
"My Throat Is an Open Grave"	2003	—	—	—	Demon Hunter
"Not Ready to Die"	2004	—	—	—	Summer of Darkness
"My Heartstrings Come Undone"	2004	—	—	—	Summer of Darkness
"Undying"	2005	—	—	—	The Triptych
"One Thousand Apologies"	2006	—	—	—	The Triptych
"Not I"	2006	—	—	—	The Triptych
"Snap Your Fingers, Snap Your Neck"	2007	—	—	—	The Triptych
"Fading Away"	2007	—	—	—	Storm the Gates of Hell
"Carry Me Down"	2007	—	—	1	Storm the Gates of Hell
"Collapsing" (featuring Björn "Speed" Strid)	2010	—	—	1	The World Is a Thorn
"Driving Nails"	2010	—	—	1	The World Is a Thorn
"Blood in the Tears"	2010	—	—	8	The World Is a Thorn
"LifeWar"	2010	—	—	—	The World Is a Thorn
"The Wind"	2010	—	—	19	Happy Christmas Vol. 5
"My Destiny"	2012	—	—	—	True Defiance
"God Forsaken"	2012	—	—	—	True Defiance
"Dead Flowers"	2013	—	—	1	True Defiance
"Someone to Hate"	2013	—	—	—	True Defiance
"Artificial Light"	2014	49	—	27	Extremist
"The Last One Alive"	2014	38	43	1	Extremist
"I Will Fail You"	2014	37	34	—	Extremist
"Cold Winter Sun"	2016	—	—	1	Outlive
"Died in My Sleep"	2017	—	—	—	Outlive
"Half as Dead"	2017	—	—	—	Outlive
"Raining Down"	2017	—	—	1	Outlive
"On My Side"	2018	45	—	—	War
"Peace"	2018	—	—	—	Peace
"The Negative"	2019	—	—	—	War
"Recuse Myself"	2019	—	—	—	Peace
"Close Enough"	2019	—	—	—	War
"More Than Bones"	2019	—	—	—	Peace
"Ash"	2019	—	—	—	War
"Freedom Is Dead"	2022	—	—	—	Exile
"Silence the World" (featuring Tom S. Englund)	2022	—	—	—	Exile
"Defense Mechanism" (featuring Max Cavalera)	2022	—	—	—	Exile
"Heaven Don't Cry"	2022	—	—	—	Exile
"Godless" (featuring Richie Faulkner)	2022	—	—	—	Exile
"Master"	2022	—	—	—	Exile
"The Brink"	2023	—	—	—	Non-album single
"Some of Us"	2023	—	—	—	Non-album single
"Worlds Apart"	2024	—	—	—	Non-album single
"Black Stained Glass"	2024	—	—	—	Non-album single
"Falling Apart" (with Set the Sun)	2025	—	—	—	Non-album single
"I'm Done"	2025	—	—	5	There Was a Light Here
"Light Bends"	2025	—	—	—	There Was a Light Here
"Sorrow Light the Way"	2025	—	—	—	There Was a Light Here
"The Pain In Me Is Gone"	2025	—	—	18	There Was a Light Here

== Other charted songs ==
Song	Year	Peak chart positions	Album
Song	Year	Christian Digital	Album
"I Am a Stone"	2012	33	True Defiance (Deluxe Edition)

== Music videos ==
Year	Title	Director(s)
2002	"Infected"	Derek Dale
2004	"Not Ready to Die"	Derek Dale
2005	"Undying"	Chris Sims
2006	"One Thousand Apologies"	Darren Doane
2007	"Fading Away"	Zach Merck
2008	"Carry Me Down"	Zach Merck
2010	"Collapsing"	Steve Hoover
2010	"LifeWar"	Cale Glendening
2012	"My Destiny"	Robby Starbuck
2014	"I Will Fail You"	Caleb Kuhl
2015	"Death"	Oguz Uygur and Titus Richard
2015	"The Last One Alive"	Unknown
2017	"Died In My Sleep"	Unknown
2019	"On My Side"	Andy Maier
2019	"More Than Bones"	Andy Maier
2019	"The Negative"	Oleg Masnyy
2020	"Lesser Gods"	Brad Hartley
2020	"Cut to Fit"	Andy Maier
2022	"Freedom Is Dead"	Darren Craig
2025	"Falling Apart"	Ryan Clark
2025	"I'm Done"	Ryan Clark
2025	"Light Bends"	Ryan Clark
2025	"Sorrow Light the Way"	Ryan Clark
2025	"There Was A Light Here"	Ryan Clark

== Non-album tracks ==
- This is Solid State Vol. 3, "Through the Black (Demo)" 2002
- Blessed Resistance Fan Club Exclusive, "Storm the Gates of Hell (Demo)" 2008
- X 2010, "Collapsing (Radio Edit)" 2010
- Happy Christmas Volume 5, "The Wind" 2010
- Blessed Resistance Fan Club Exclusive, "Collapsing (OG Version)" 2012
