= Demon Hunter (album) =

Studio album by Demon Hunter
- Released: October 22, 2002
- Recorded: June – August 2002
- Studio: The Black Dungeon
- Genre: Metalcore; nu metal; alternative metal
- Length: 38:39
- Label: Solid State
- Producer: Aaron Sprinkle, Demon Hunter

Demon Hunter chronology
Demon Hunter (2002)	Summer of Darkness (2004)

Singles from Demon Hunter
- 1. "Infected" Released: 2002; 2. "Through the Black" Released: 2002; 3. "My Throat Is an Open Grave" Released: 2003

Demon Hunter is the debut studio album by American Christian metal band Demon Hunter. It was released on Solid State Records on October 22, 2002.

== Recording ==
The album was recorded in Drop C tuning. All of Demon Hunter's subsequent releases would be dropped even lower to Drop B. Industrial vocal elements are also featured in various songs.

== Touring and promotion ==
Demon Hunter joined Extol on tour in the summer of 2003.

Demon Hunter's material first appeared on This Is Solid State Vol. 3 in February 2002, which included a demo recording of the band's song "Through the Black". "Through the Black" was later re-recorded for Demon Hunter's self-titled album. The band's first single, "Infected," had a music video which debuted on MTV2's Extreme Rock and found considerable airplay on Fuse TV's Uranium. The intense video revolves around two subjects; one, vocalist Ryan Clark, is shown using an extravagant dagger to carve the word "HELP" into a tree in the pouring rain. The second subject is a white collared man at a desk who, for ambiguous reasons, is overcome with extreme panic. The man finally falls to the floor after typing "help" repeatedly on his keyboard, with the word being shown on a monitor. "Infected" would be featured on the compilation album MTV2 Headbangers Ball in 2003. Demon Hunter was later included on Death, a Destination^{1}, the band's second compilation album, in 2011.

== Album art and booklet ==
The band members are not credited in the album's liner notes. Clark explained this by citing the fact that Demon Hunter's members have been in previous groups and that they wanted the band to initially rely solely on its music. The Demon Hunter booklet has four chapters: "Letters from the Seventh War", "The Red Wasp/The Everlasting Death", "Love and Grace for Fallen Souls", and "The Awakening". The first three chapters comprise three tracks each, with the last one consisting only of the last track on the album. When asked about this, Clark responded:

"It was more an artwork based concept as opposed to a concept pertaining to the music. We wanted to give it an old world feel, with the book and everything. Just a way to make the artwork really come alive."

== Reception ==
Professional ratings
Review scores
Source	Rating
Allmusic	3/5 stars
Cross Rhythms	7/10 stars
Jesus Freak Hideout	4.5/5 stars

Demon Hunter was generally well received. Allmusic's Alex Henderson rated the album three out of five stars. He described it as "an album in which moments of intense brutality are followed by hauntingly melodic passages." He commended the band for its "complementary" use of intensity and melody". CMJ called the album "Christian death metal at its finest", noting that the album is overstuffed with styles, "but that's just the way metalcore kids like it." Exclaim!'s Greg Pratt called the album "metalcore at its finest." Though he found the album not up to the standard of the band's peers on Solid State, particularly Zao, Norma Jean, and Living Sacrifice, and said that the music was repetitive in places, he wrote that the songwriting keeps things interesting and that " for the teen angst-types looking for something more genuine than whatever the mainstream is pumping out, Demon Hunter will be a good stepping stone to get kids into more underground tunes."

== Track listing ==
All tracks are written by Demon Hunter.

No.	Title	Length
1.	"Screams of the Undead"	4:34
2.	"I Have Seen Where It Grows"	3:14
3.	"Infected^{[a]}"	3:08
4.	"My Throat Is an Open Grave^{[b]}"	3:54
5.	"Through the Black"	4:27
6.	"Turn Your Back and Run"	3:46
7.	"And the Sky Went Red"	0:29
8.	"As We Wept"	3:42
9.	"A Broken Upper Hand"	4:28
10.	"The Gauntlet"	6:53
Total length:		38:39

^{a} Live recording appears on both 45 Days (2008) and Live in Nashville (2009)
^{b} Re-recorded for Songs of Death and Resurrection (2021)

== Personnel ==
Band members

- Ryan Clark – lead vocals, guitars
- Don Clark – bass guitar
- Jesse Sprinkle – drums, percussion

Production

- Brandon Ebel – executive producer
- Aaron Sprinkle – producer, additional guitars
- Demon Hunter – producer
- J.R. McNeely – mixing at The Greenhouse (Vancouver)
- Latif Tayour – mixing assistant
- Asterik Studio – art direction, design (Seattle)
- Kris McCaddon – photography
- Phil Peterson – strings
- Tim Harmon – drum engineering at Spectre South (Tacoma)
- Aaron Mlasko – drum technician
- Troy Glessner – mastering at Spectre North
- Tyson Paoletti – A&R
- Josh Tillman – additional drums

== Appearances ==
- "Infected" was featured on the Killing Floor 2 soundtrack in 2015.

== Notes ==
^{1.}Death, a Destination also includes the studio albums Summer of Darkness (2004) and The Triptych (2005).
