= Songs of Death and Resurrection =

Studio album of re-recorded songs by Demon Hunter
- Released: March 5, 2021
- Recorded: 2020
- Genre: Acoustic rock
- Length: 62:40
- Label: Solid State

Demon Hunter chronology
Peace (2019)	Songs of Death and Resurrection (2021)	Exile (2022)

Singles from Songs of Death and Resurrection
- 1. "I Will Fail You" Released: January 16, 2021; 2. "Dead Flowers" Released: January 16, 2021; 3. "Loneliness" Released: February 13, 2021

Professional ratings
Review scores
Source	Rating
Jesus Freak Hideout	3/5 stars 2.5/5 stars

Songs of Death and Resurrection is a collection of reworked versions of previously released songs by American Christian metal band Demon Hunter, released by Solid State Records on March 5, 2021.

The album consists of new studio recordings of songs from across their catalog, deconstructed and reconstructed into "Resurrected" versions, primarily in the acoustic format, and often accompanied by piano and strings. In addition to songs like "Dead Flowers (Resurrected)" and "The Heart of a Graveyard (Resurrected)," there was a "resurrected" version of a previously unheard song, "Praise the Void." The original version later appeared on the band's eleventh studio album, Exile.

== Track listing ==
No.	Title	Original album	Length
1.	"My Throat Is an Open Grave (Resurrected)"	Demon Hunter (2002)	4:15
2.	"Dead Flowers (Resurrected)"	True Defiance (2012)	5:37
3.	"The Heart of a Graveyard (Resurrected)"	Extremist (2014)	4:34
4.	"Praise the Void (Resurrected)"	later released on Exile (2022)	4:48
5.	"Blood in the Tears (Resurrected)"	The World Is a Thorn (2010)	5:18
6.	"Loneliness (Resurrected)"	Peace (2019)	6:06
7.	"I Am a Stone (Resurrected)"	True Defiance (2012)	5:21
8.	"I Will Fail You (Resurrected)"	Extremist (2014)	5:21
9.	"Deteriorate (Resurrected)"	The Triptych (2005)	5:31
10.	"Carry Me Down (Resurrected)"	Storm the Gates of Hell (2007)	4:55
11.	"The Tide Began to Rise (Resurrected)"	The Triptych (2005)	5:46
12.	"My Heartstrings Come Undone (Resurrected)"	Summer of Darkness (2004)	5:08
Total length:			62:40

== Personnel ==
Demon Hunter

- Ryan Clark – vocals, art direction and design for Invisible Creature, Inc.
- Patrick Judge – acoustic lead guitar
- Jeremiah Scott – acoustic rhythm guitar, additional vocals on "Dead Flowers", "Deteriorate", "The Tide Began to Rise", studio photography
- Jon Dunn – acoustic bass guitar
- Timothy "Yogi" Watts – drums, additional vocals on "Dead Flowers", "Deteriorate", "The Tide Began to Rise"

Additional personnel

- Peggy Clark - additional vocals on "Loneliness", "Dead Flowers"
- Joanna Ott - piano, additional vocals on "Dead Flowers", "The Tide Began to Rise"
- Chris Carmichael - strings arrangements
- Eliran Kantor - artwork painted
