= Trying Times =

Trying Times may refer to:

- Trying Times (album), a 2026 album by James Blake
- Trying Times (TV series), a 1987–89 anthology comedy television series
- "Trying Times", a 2017 song by Demon Hunter from Outlive

== See also ==
- Lines, Vines and Trying Times
