= Artificial Light (song) =

Single by Demon Hunter

from the album Extremist
- Released: February 13, 2014
- Genre: Metalcore
- Length: 4:29
- Label: Solid State
- Songwriters: Ryan Clark, Patrick Judge
- Producers: Jeremiah Scott, Aaron Sprinkle

Demon Hunter singles chronology
"Someone to Hate" (2013)	"Artificial Light" (2014)	"The Last One Alive" (2014)

"Artificial Light" is the lead single by American Christian metal band Demon Hunter from their seventh studio album, Extremist.

== Lyric video ==
The song's official lyric video was uploaded to Solid State's official YouTube channel on February 13, 2014. The video was designed by Online Revolution Design.

== Chart performance ==
Chart (2014)	Peak positions
Hot Christian Songs	49

== Personnel ==
- Ryan Clark – vocals
- Patrick Judge – lead guitar
- Jeremiah Scott – rhythm guitar
- Jon Dunn – bass
- Timothy Watts – drums
