= Timothy Watts =

American drummer (born 1977)

Tim Watts
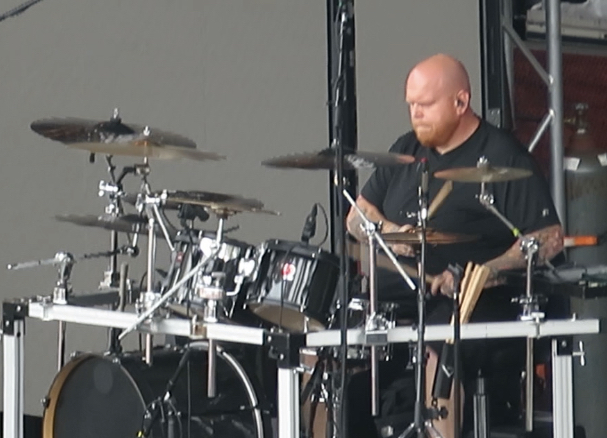
- Watts performing at the Chicago Open Air Festival in 2017

Background information
- Also known as: Yogi
- Born: Timothy Watts; September 4, 1977 (age 48)
- Origin: Rutherfordton, North Carolina, U.S.
- Genres: Christian metal; metalcore; alternative metal; nu metal; groove metal; Christian rock
- Occupation: Drummer
- Years active: 2003–present
- Member of: Demon Hunter
- Formerly of: Holland, The Showdown, Throwdown, The Becoming, Superdrag, Benton Blout
- Website: Yogi Watts on Facebook

Timothy "Yogi" Watts is an American musician, best known as the drummer for the Christian metal band Demon Hunter since 2004. He was the fourth drummer for The Showdown, original drummer for The Lonely Hearts (originally named Holland), and fill-in drummer for Throwdown as well as The Becoming.

== History ==
Before joining Demon Hunter, Watts was the original drummer for The Lonely Hearts (Originally called Holland), performing on their albums Photographs & Tidalwaves and Paper Tapes.

After leaving the Lonely Hearts, Demon Hunter hit the road that summer with Watts as their touring drummer, as Jesse Sprinkle could not make the tour. This time Demon Hunter took with them rock/post-hardcore band Dead Poetic, along with fellow Solid State metalcore band Haste the Day. Post-hardcore band Staple replaced Haste the Day towards the end of the tour. Watts' Demon Hunter debut, as well as Ethan Luck's, was The Triptych.

Watts replaced A.J. Barrette of the heavy metal band The Showdown, as fellow Demon Hunter member Jeremiah Scott replaced Eric Koruschak, who played bass. Watts only appeared on Blood in the Gears before being replaced by Isaac Harris. The Showdown went on indefinite hiatus soon after.

Watts played live for Throwdown on the Brawloween Tour in 2011. He is currently playing drums live for Benton Blount, a fairly new country artist, along with Demon Hunter guitarist Patrick Judge. In 2007 he played drums on John Davis' second solo album, Arigato!, recording the tracks in just two days. He also played drums for The Becoming who has hosted members of Demon Hunter and Project 86, while Patrick Judge playing Guitars again.

In 2015, Watts' home caught fire, destroying their home and everything inside, save for their four pet ferrets. Watts and his wife were returning from a doctor's visit, as the couple were at the time expecting their first child, to find their apartment complex in flames. His wife was 39 weeks pregnant at the time. They had their child soon after the accident. By September, Watts, his wife and his daughter moved into their new house. Watts played for The Letter Black and played The Kingdom Festival in Greentown in June 2023.

== Bands ==
Current

- Demon Hunter (2004–present)
- World Gone Cold (2023–present)
- The Letter Black (2023-present)

Former

- My Friend Stephanie (1997–2001)
- The Lonely Hearts (2003–2006)
- The Showdown (2009–2010)
- The Becoming

Live

- Throwdown (2011)
- Benton Blout (2014–present)
- Superdrag

Session

- John Davis (2007)

== Discography ==
The Lonely Hearts

- Photographs & Tidalwaves (2003; as Holland)
- Paper Tapes (2006)

Demon Hunter

- The Triptych (2005)
- Storm the Gates of Hell (2007)
- 45 Days (2008)
- Live in Nashville (2008)
- The World Is a Thorn (2010)
- True Defiance (2012)
- Extremist (2014)
- Outlive (2017)
- War (2019)
- Peace (2019)
- Songs of Death and Resurrection (2021)
- Exile (2022)
- There Was a Light Here (2025)

John Davis

- Arigato! (2007)

The Showdown

- Blood in the Gears (2011)
