= The Last One Alive =

Single by Demon Hunter

from the album Extremist
- Released: February 25, 2014
- Genre: Christian metal; alternative metal
- Length: 4:25
- Label: Solid State
- Songwriters: Ryan Clark; Patrick Judge
- Producers: Jeremiah Scott; Aaron Sprinkle

Demon Hunter singles chronology
"Artificial Light" (2014)	"The Last One Alive" (2014)	"I Will Fail You" (2014)

"The Last One Alive" is the second single by American Christian metal band Demon Hunter from their seventh studio album, Extremist.

== Video ==
The song's official lyric video was created by Online Revolution Design and premiered on February 25, 2014.

== Chart performance ==
Chart (2014)	Peak positions
Hot Christian Songs	38
Christian Digital Songs	43

== Personnel ==
- Ryan Clark – vocals
- Patrick Judge – lead guitar
- Jeremiah Scott – rhythm guitar
- Jon Dunn – bass
- Timothy Watts – drums
