= There Was a Light Here =

Studio album by Demon Hunter
- Released: September 12, 2025
- Recorded: June 2024–January 2025
- Studios: Southern Oracle, The Property in Maple Valley
- Genres: Christian metal, alternative metal, metalcore
- Length: 56:41
- Label: Weapons MFG
- Producers: Jeremiah Scott; Ryan Clark

Demon Hunter chronology
Exile (2022)	There Was a Light Here (2025)

Singles from There Was a Light Here
- 1. "I'm Done" Released: May 2, 2025; 2. "Light Bends" Released: June 6, 2025; 3. "Sorrow Light the Way" Released: July 4, 2025; 4. "The Pain in Me Is Gone" Released: August 7, 2025; 5. "There Was a Light Here" Released: September 9, 2025

There Was a Light Here is the twelfth studio album by American Christian metal band Demon Hunter, released through their self-founded record label, Weapons MFG. It was released on September 12, 2025, and is also their first album since Summer of Darkness to not have an accompanying deluxe edition with release.

== Background ==
On May 2, 2025, Demon Hunter released the single "I'm Done", and on June 6, 2025, they released the single "Light Bends". Another single, "Sorrow Light the Way", was released on July 4, 2025.

Four days later, the band announced their new album to be titled There Was a Light Here and the release date on September 12, 2025. Two more singles were released ahead of There Was a Light Here; "The Pain in Me Is Gone" and the title track, which was written in memory of Ryan Clark's mother who died in 2023, with the album dedicated to her.

== Touring ==
In support of the album, the band embarked on a North American tour in September and October 2025 with support by War of Ages, Convictions, and Cultist, starting on September 20, 2025 in West Chicago, IL.

== Reception ==
Professional ratings
Review scores
Source	Rating
Jesus Freak Hideout	4.5/5 stars

=== Critical ===
Speaking for Jesus Freak Hideout, Evan Dickens labelled There Was a Light Here as "[Demon Hunter's] best work in nearly a decade," as well being "an immediate contender for best album of the year." He went on to praise the album's "expansive sonic playground." Dickens also stated that the album's ending had significant "emotional resonance," as opposed to most of Demon Hunter's albums. He completed the review in saying that the album was "a thoughtful masterpiece," awarding the album with a four-out-of-five star rating.

In agreement with the rating, Scott Fryberger spoke on the album in a second review for Jesus Freak Hideout. He observed that the album contained a combination of "furious metalcore," "rock ballads," and "really strong rock tracks," succeeding in "balanc[ing] the harder and softer sides really well." He noted that it was "emotionally heavy" and overall, stated that the album was "easily one of the strongest, most mature, and most well-rounded albums the band has ever released." Jesus Freak Hideout labelled the album as the second best album of 2025, following Plead the Widow's Cause' Silver Glass Stare.

=== Commercial ===
Within its first charting week, There Was a Light Here debuted at its peak position of number 9 on the Billboard Top Christian Albums chart and number 25 on the Top Album Sales chart.

=== Accolades ===
Year-end lists
Publication	Accolade	Rank	Ref.
Jesus Freak Hideout	Top Albums of 2025	2	

Year	Organization	Nominee / work	Category	Result	Ref.
2025	We Love Awards	"Sorrow Light the Way"	Rock / Alternative Song of the Year	Nominated	
2026	Dove Awards	There Was a Light Here	Rock/Contemporary Album of the Year	Pending	

== Track listing ==
All music is composed by Ryan Clark, except where noted.

No.	Title	Writer(s)	Length
1.	"My Place in the Dirt"		5:17
2.	"Sorrow Light the Way"		4:30
3.	"Light Bends"	Patrick Judge; Ryan Clark	4:11
4.	"The Pain in Me Is Gone"		4:41
5.	"By a Thread"		4:02
6.	"I'm Done"		4:49
7.	"Ouroboros"		4:03
8.	"Breaking Through Me"		5:15
9.	"Overwhelming Closure"		4:34
10.	"Hang the Fire"	Judge; Clark	4:51
11.	"Reflected"		4:14
12.	"There Was a Light Here"		6:14
Total length:			56:41

== Personnel ==
Demon Hunter

- Ryan Clark – lead vocals
- Patrick Judge – lead guitar, keyboards, programming
- Jeremiah Scott – rhythm guitar, backing vocals
- Jon Dunn – bass
- Timothy "Yogi" Watts – drums, backing vocals

Additional Musicians

- Mikey Ferrera – additional percussion on track 12
- Ryan Maxine Clark – choir vocals on track 12
- Penny Scott – choir vocals on track 12
- Izzy Scott – choir vocals on track 12
- Annabelle Scott – choir vocals on track 12
- Becky Scott – choir vocals on track 12

Production

- Ryan Clark – production, art direction, design
- Jeremiah Scott – production, engineering, additional photography
- Zeuss – mixing, mastering
- Eric Stenman – mixing on track 12
- Josh Foreman – artwork sculpture design
- Ryan J. Downey – management

== Charts ==
Chart performance for There Was a Light Here
Chart (2025)	Peak position
US Top Album Sales (Billboard)	25
US Top Christian Albums (Billboard)	9
