= Summer of Darkness =

Studio album by Demon Hunter
- Released: May 4, 2004
- Recorded: November – December 2003
- Studio: Compound Studios, Seattle, Washington
- Genre: Metalcore; alternative metal; nu metal
- Length: 54:47
- Label: Solid State
- Producer: Aaron Sprinkle

Demon Hunter chronology
Demon Hunter (2002)	Summer of Darkness (2004)	The Triptych (2005)

Singles from Summer of Darkness
- 1. "Not Ready to Die" Released: 2004

Professional ratings
Review scores
Source	Rating
Allmusic	3/5 stars
Cross Rhythms	8/10 stars
Jesus Freak Hideout	4/5 stars
Melodic.net	2.5/5 stars
Punknews.org	2/5 stars

Summer of Darkness is the second studio album by American Christian metal band Demon Hunter, released through Solid State on May 4, 2004. In the first week, the album sold 4,247 copies.

Vocalist Ryan Clark described Summer of Darkness in a 2003 interview as being heavier than Demon Hunter's self-titled debut album. The band's first album, released in October 2002, was recorded in drop C tuning while Summer of Darkness was dropped down to drop B tuning. He also cited that the group had more time to record than with their previous release. Guest vocalists, who were friends of the band, appear on four songs on the album and include Mike Williams, Howard Jones, Brock Lindow, and Trevor McNevan. Summer of Darkness is Demon Hunter's only album with Kris McCaddon on lead guitar, as well as the band's first album with bass guitarist Jon Dunn and the last to have Jesse Sprinkle on drums.

The album's lead single, "Not Ready to Die", received a music video and significant airplay on MTV2's Headbangers Ball and Fuse TV. In June 2004, Demon Hunter began touring the United States in promotion of Summer of Darkness. This included all major cities and extended to the East Coast where they had not previously performed. The album was later included on Demon Hunter's Double Take^{1} (2007) and Death, a Destination^{2} (2011) compilations.

== Track listing ==
All tracks are written by Demon Hunter.

No.	Title	Length
1.	"Not Ready to Die^{[a]}"	5:03
2.	"The Awakening"	4:11
3.	"Beheaded" (featuring Mike Williams)	3:14
4.	"My Heartstrings Come Undone^{[a]}^{[b]}"	4:37
5.	"Our Faces Fall Apart" (featuring Howard Jones)	4:51
6.	"Less Than Nothing"	2:57
7.	"Summer of Darkness"	3:10
8.	"Beauty Through the Eyes of a Predator" (featuring Brock Lindow)	5:32
9.	"Annihilate the Corrupt"	4:08
10.	"I Play Dead"	5:20
11.	"Everything Was White"	3:54
12.	"Coffin Builder" (featuring Trevor McNevan)	4:01
13.	"The Latest and the Last"	3:44
Total length:		54:47

^{a} Live recording appears on both 45 Days (2008) and Live in Nashville (2009)
^{b} Re-recorded for Songs of Death and Resurrection (2021)

== Charts ==
Chart (2004)	Peak position
US Top Christian Albums	23
US Top Heatseekers	22

== Personnel ==
Demon Hunter

- Ryan Clark – vocals
- Don Clark – rhythm guitar
- Jon Dunn – bass guitar
- Kris McCaddon – lead guitar
- Jesse Sprinkle – drums

Additional musicians

- Mike Williams (The Agony Scene) – guest vocals ("Beheaded")
- Howard Jones (Blood Has Been Shed, Killswitch Engage) – guest vocals ("Our Faces Fall Apart")
- Brock Lindow (36 Crazyfists) – guest vocals ("Beauty Through the Eyes of a Predator")
- Trevor McNevan (Thousand Foot Krutch) – guest vocals ("Coffin Builder")

Production

- Brandon Ebel – executive producer
- Aaron Sprinkle – producer
- Zach Hodges – assistant producer
- J.R. McNeely – mixing
- Demon Hunter, Asterik Studio – art direction, design
- Jeff Gros – band photography
- Kris McCaddon – cover photography
- Aaron Mlasko – drum technician
- Tyson Paoletti – A&R
- Troy Glessner – mastering

== Appearances ==
- "My Heartstrings Come Undone" was featured on the soundtrack to the movie Resident Evil: Apocalypse in 2004.

== Notes ==
^{1.}Double Take also includes the studio album The Triptych (2005).

^{2.}Death, a Destination also includes the studio albums Demon Hunter (2002) and The Triptych (2005).
