= Training for Utopia =

American metalcore band

- Origin: Sacramento, California, U.S.
- Genres: Metalcore; industrial metal; noise metal
- Years active: 1996–2000, 2023–present
- Labels: Solid State, Tooth & Nail, Weapons MFG
- Past members: Ryan Clark; Don Clark; Steve Saxby; Morley Boyer

Training for Utopia, also stylized as TFU, is an American metalcore band, initially active from 1996 to 2000.

== History ==
The band first signed with Tooth & Nail Records and was later moved to Solid State Records, the Tooth & Nail imprint that promotes heavy Christian music. Training for Utopia subsequently became popular in the Christian metal scene during its active years, although the band actively tried to remove themselves from that label during their later years.

Their brief existence included a tour with Zao and at the time the upcoming band Spitfire, as well as Warlord. After a temporary hiatus the band returned with their second full length Throwing a Wrench into the American Music Machine, which has been noted as a shift away from the band's early metalcore sound, utilizing heavier use of electronics and sampling. After a small tour of the material the band disbanded.

At the demise of Training for Utopia, members Ryan (formerly of Focal Point) and Don Clark announced that they were starting a new project called The American Spectator in October 2000. Don and Ryan Clark started "Asterik Studio" in Seattle, a graphic design shop where they completed many projects, including album artwork for former label-mates. In 2000, they founded the Christian metal band Demon Hunter.

On February 3, 2023, Training for Utopia was announced as one of several bands reuniting to play the 2023 Furnace Fest. On September 1st, before their appearance at Furnace Fest, the band released their first single in 24 years, "Out on Parole".

== Members ==
- Ryan Clark – vocals, guitar (currently with Demon Hunter)
- Don Clark – guitar (played with Demon Hunter)
- Steve Saxby – bass guitar, vocals (currently with Out of Place)
- Morley Boyer – drums (played on An Angle)

Additional members

- Rob Dennler – vocals (1996) (played with The Roots of Orchis)
- Carlos Colon – synthesizers (1998) (later joined The Deadlines)

== Discography ==
Title	Release date	Notes	Label
The Falling Cycle EP	1997-07-29		Tooth & Nail
Plastic Soul Impalement	1998-03-03		Tooth & Nail
The Split EP	1998-08-18	Split with Zao	Solid State
Throwing a Wrench into the American Music Machine	1999-11-02		Solid State
Technical Difficulties	2004-04-20	Best of	Solid State
