= I Will Fail You =

Single by Demon Hunter

from the album Extremist
- Released: April 10, 2014
- Genre: Alternative metal
- Length: 4:44
- Label: Solid State
- Songwriter(s): Ryan Clark, Patrick Judge
- Producer(s): Jeremiah Scott, Aaron Sprinkle

Demon Hunter singles chronology
"The Last One Alive" (2014)	"I Will Fail You" (2014)	"Cold Winter Sun" (2016)

"I Will Fail You" is the third single by American Christian metal band Demon Hunter from their seventh studio album, Extremist. The song is the band's most commercially successful single to date.

== About ==
Vocalist Ryan Clark has said the song is about the scrutiny the band faces, and how they aren't "holy enough" for some people, no matter how much they express their beliefs.

== Music video ==
The song's music video begins with vocalist Ryan Clark standing on the side of the road, looking distraught. As the song begins, he gets in the car and begins to sing the song's lyrics while driving. After the first chorus, it begins to rain. During the second chorus, the rain stops and Clark lights a cigarette, while still driving; after a while he takes some pills to keep him awake. Near the song's end, he starts to fall asleep and the video cuts to someone who has been tied up and gagged. As Clark falls asleep, the video pans out to reveal the person is sitting in the car next to him. As the video ends, the headlights of an oncoming car can be seen as the other man starts to panic.

The video was directed by photographer Caleb Kuhl.

== Reception ==
Greg Kennelty of Metal Injection compared Clark's vocals to that of the late David Gold of Woods of Ypres. Kennelty said the pitch correction is noticeable, but overall declared the song to be good. Axl Rosenberg of MetalSucks compared the song negatively to post-grunge band Staind.

== Chart performance ==
Chart (2014)	Peak positions
US Hot Christian Songs	37
US Christian Digital Songs	34

== Personnel ==
- Ryan Clark – vocals
- Patrick Judge – lead guitar
- Jeremiah Scott – rhythm guitar
- Jon Dunn – bass
- Timothy Watts – drums
