= True Defiance =

Studio album by Demon Hunter
- Released: April 10, 2012
- Genre: Groove metal, metalcore, melodic death metal
- Length: 48:37
- Label: Solid State
- Producer: Aaron Sprinkle

Demon Hunter chronology
The World Is a Thorn (2010)	True Defiance (2012)	Extremist (2014)

Alternative covers
- Standard Edition #2

Alternative cover
- Deluxe Edition

Singles from True Defiance
- 1. "My Destiny" Released: March 12, 2012

Professional ratings
Review scores
Source	Rating
AllMusic	3.5/5 stars
Alternative Press	2/5 stars
Jesus Freak Hideout	Timothy Estabrooks: Kevin Hoskins:

True Defiance is the sixth studio album by American Christian metal band Demon Hunter. It was released April 10, 2012. Production work for the album comes from regular Solid State and Tooth & Nail Records producer Aaron Sprinkle while mixing was finished by Jason Suecof.

The album also returns to utilizing three different cover arts specific to each version of the album, much like what the band did with their 2005 album The Triptych. It is also their first album since The Triptych not to feature any guest musicians.

== Background ==
"This record is without a doubt our most aggressive. Every Demon Hunter record must be a step up from the last. I know that's a goal for every band, but it seldom works that way - especially today, especially in metal. It seems like most band's prime years are long behind them. I refuse to let that be the case for us. We've been extremely underwhelmed with metal for the last five years or so, and that's been the fuel to create this record. With an extreme over-saturation of false, fleeting, trend-hopping noise in today's metal scene, we had to make something we've been longing to hear. Something truly meaningful and artistic. Something our fans would love and something that will turn the heads of those who have ignored us for the past decade." (Ryan Clark, Main Vocalist on the band's direction with True Defiance.)

The deluxe edition comprises two bonus songs, a DVD featuring acoustic performances, interviews and in-depth song discussions, a five-inch metal "True Defiance" pendant in a custom holder, a 20-page large-format photo booklet, lyric cards for each of the songs with an illustration printed in metallic ink, and a two-sided fold-out poster of album covers housed in a 7 x 7-inch box.

== Critical reception ==
The album received mixed to positive reviews. The album was a commercial success reaching No. 36 on the Billboard 200, better than their previous album The World Is a Thorn, and No. 2 On the Top Christian Albums chart. James Christopher Monger from Allmusic gave the album 3 1/2 out of 5 stars saying "The sixth full-length outing from Demon Hunter dials up the religious themes to 11 while maintaining a dark and ominous luster that dutifully upholds heavy metal's core values of volume, aggression, and defiance. The aptly named True Defiance juggles elements of metalcore, emo, thrash, and groove metal, offering up nine tightly wound haymakers, one vaguely forgettable power ballad ('Tomorrow Never Comes'), and even a moody acoustic instrumental piece ('Means to an End')." Ryan Wasoba of Alternative Press gave the album 2 out of 5 stars stating, "It may be hard for some to get past Demon Hunter’s religious affiliation. They are openly Christian, which means they interpret song titles such as 'Crucifix' and 'God Forsaken' more literal than the average metal band."

== Track listing ==
All tracks are written by Demon Hunter.

No.	Title	Length
1.	"Crucifix"	3:44
2.	"God Forsaken"	5:49
3.	"My Destiny"	4:15
4.	"Wake"	4:12
5.	"Tomorrow Never Comes"	4:54
6.	"Someone to Hate"	5:24
7.	"This I Know"	4:04
8.	"Means to an End" (Instrumental)	2:50
9.	"We Don't Care"	3:37
10.	"Resistance"	4:25
11.	"Dead Flowers^{[a]}"	5:23
Total length:		48:37

Deluxe edition bonus tracks
No.	Title	Length
12.	"What Is Left"	4:28
13.	"I Am a Stone^{[a]}"	5:46
Total length:		58:49

^{a} Re-recorded for Songs of Death and Resurrection (2021)

Standard Edition Track listing Reference Deluxe Edition Track listing Reference

Deluxe Edition DVD tracks
No.	Title	Length
1.	"The 6th Album" (Interview)
2.	"The Blueprint" (Interview)
3.	"The Lyrics" (Interview)
4.	"The Process" (Interview)
5.	"The Fuel" (Interview)
6.	"Means to an End" (Acoustic Performance)
7.	"Crucifix" (Song Discussion)
8.	"God Forsaken" (Song Discussion)
9.	"My Destiny" (Song Discussion)
10.	"Wake" (Song Discussion)
11.	"Tomorrow Never Comes" (Song Discussion)
12.	"Tomorrow Never Comes" (Acoustic Performance)
13.	"Someone to Hate" (Song Discussion)
14.	"This I Know" (Song Discussion)
15.	"We Don't Care" (Song Discussion)
16.	"Resistance" (Song Discussion)
17.	"Dead Flowers" (Song Discussion)
18.	"What Is Left" (Song Discussion)
19.	"I Am a Stone" (Song Discussion)
20.	"I Am a Stone" (Acoustic Performance)

== Personnel ==
Demon Hunter

- Ryan Clark – lead vocals
- Patrick Judge – lead guitar, backing vocals
- Jeremiah Scott – rhythm guitar
- Jon Dunn – bass guitar
- Timothy "Yogi" Watts – drums, backing vocals

Production

- Aaron Sprinkle – producer
- Jeremiah Scott – producer
- Jason Suecof – mixing
- Chris Carmichael — strings (Deluxe Edition)

Line-up reference:

== Appearances ==
- "We Don't Care" was featured on the Killing Floor 2 soundtrack in 2015.
