= The Triptych =

2005 studio album by Demon Hunter

Studio album by Demon Hunter
- Released: October 25, 2005
- Recorded: July 2005
- Genres: Metalcore, groove metal, Christian metal
- Length: 51:02
- Label: Solid State
- Producer: Aaron Sprinkle

Demon Hunter chronology
Summer of Darkness (2004)	The Triptych (2005)	Storm the Gates of Hell (2007)

Alternative covers
- One of the three original covers

Alternative cover
- One of the three original covers

The Triptych is the third studio album by American Christian metal band Demon Hunter, released on October 25, 2005. Produced by Aaron Sprinkle (Emery, Fair) and mixed by Machine (Lamb of God), The Triptych had three different album covers—implying a traditional triptych—by Dan Seagrave.

The album hit the No. 1 position on the Billboard's Heatseekers chart during its first week of release in stores, with 6,000 copies sold, and was re-released on October 31, 2006. The album was later included on Demon Hunter's Double Take^{1} (2007) and Death, a Destination^{2} (2011) compilations.

Vocalist Ryan Clark described in a 2009 interview that, while the previous two albums had him record vocals with a standing, screened microphone, for The Triptych, he used a basic handheld mic. This allowed him to move around freely and hold longer notes; however, it also allowed Clark to naturally cup the mic, which consequently muffled or distanced his vocals.

== Critical reception ==
Professional ratings
Review scores
Source	Rating
AllMusic	4.5/5 stars
Cross Rhythms	8/10 stars
Exclaim!	Highly unfavorable
Jesus Freak Hideout	4.5/5 stars
Melodic.net	4/5 stars
Rhapsody	Positive link

The album received generally positive views and was a huge commercial success, reaching No 10. in the Top Christian Albums chart in 2005 and the No. 1 spot on the Top Heatseekers chart in 2006. Eduardo Rivadavia from AllMusic gave the album 4 1/2 out of 5 stars, saying "Christian metal has enjoyed startlingly infrequent success stories over the years." Kaj Roth from Melodic.net gave the album 4 out of 5 stars, stating "This is a numetal monster of a record, what you possibly can ask for in a mega heavy record with all from a gigantic rhythm section to murderous riffs, roars of anger and blockbuster choruses [sic]. It is all here in this package called "The triptych", [sic] this really came as a surprise to me since I wasn't too impressed with Demon Hunter's previous album "Summer of Darkness" [sic]. It was a bit non-melodic and contained more growls than melodic vocals but this time, the vocals is more balanced and the band has also written better songs - you could say they have grown from medium size to X-large."

== Track listing ==
All tracks are written by Demon Hunter, except where noted.

No.	Title	Writer(s)	Length
1.	"The Flame That Guides Us Home^{[a]}"		0:29
2.	"Not I^{[a]}"		4:14
3.	"Undying^{[a]}"		4:18
4.	"Relentless Intolerance"		4:02
5.	"Deteriorate^{[b]}"		5:53
6.	"The Soldier's Song"		5:24
7.	"Fire to My Soul"		4:03
8.	"One Thousand Apologies"		4:56
9.	"The Science of Lies"		4:09
10.	"Snap Your Fingers, Snap Your Neck" (Prong cover)	Tommy Victor, Ted Parsons	4:13
11.	"Ribcage^{[a]}"		3:46
12.	"The Tide Began to Rise^{[b]}"		5:35
Total length:			51:02

^{a} Live recording appears on both 45 Days (2008) and Live in Nashville (2009)
^{b} Re-recorded for Songs of Death and Resurrection (2021)

Special edition bonus tracks
No.	Title	Length
13.	"My Throat Is an Open Grave" (acoustic)	3:21
14.	"My Heartstrings Come Undone" (acoustic)	4:07
15.	"The Tide Began to Rise" (acoustic)	5:23
16.	"Undying" (Wild Boar remix)	4:12
Total length:		68:05

== Charts ==
Year	Chart	Position
2005	Billboard 200	136
2005	Top Christian Albums	10
2006	Top Heatseekers	1

== Personnel ==
Demon Hunter

- Ryan Clark — vocals
- Don Clark — rhythm guitar
- Ethan Luck — lead guitar
- Jon Dunn — bass guitar
- Timothy "Yogi" Watts — drums

Production and additional musicians

- Aaron Sprinkle — producer, additional keyboards, programming
- Lars Katz — additional guitars and assisting
- Mixed by Machine
- Mastering by Adam Ayan
- Recorded at Compound Recording, Seattle, Washington
- Cover paintings by Dan Seagrave
- Art direction by Asterisk Studio

== Singles/Videos ==
- "Undying" - the first single and video from The Triptych. The video was directed by Christopher Sims (Bleeding Through, As I Lay Dying, Kutless, Lamb of God). The song is featured on X2007.
- "One Thousand Apologies" - the second single and video, directed by Darren Doane (Deftones, Thursday, Every Time I Die, Sinai Beach). The song is featured on X2006.
- "Not I" - the final single on the CD, however, there was no video.
- "Snap Your Fingers, Snap Your Neck" - a cover song, originally written and performed by Prong, from the 1994 studio album Cleansing.

From the official website (February 18, 2006): "We can't tell you how humbled we've been by the outpouring of support from the Armed Forces. 'The Soldier's Song' is for them and the letters, photos and friendship continues. SPC Davis, SPC Peterson and SSGT Childs in Iraq, Specialist Graham who served in the Airborne in Iraq and Afghanistan, Paxton in the Air Force, and Warrant Officer Slagle are just a few of the men and women who are true HUNTERS out there sacrificing everyday, risking life and limb and often paying the ultimate price."

== Deluxe edition ==
The Triptych Deluxe Edition album cover

Professional ratings
Review scores
Source	Rating
HM Magazine	Favorable

On October 31, 2006, The Triptych was rereleased with four exclusive tracks and a DVD with footage from a live show in LA, behind the scene documentaries, studio footage, interviews with the band on the road, miscellaneous live footage from the tour, and the videos for "One Thousand Apologies", "Undying", "Not Ready to Die", and "Infected". The four exclusive tracks are:

- "My Throat Is An Open Grave (acoustic)" - 3:21
- "My Heartstrings Come Undone (acoustic)" - 4:07
- "The Tide Began To Rise (acoustic)" - 5:23
- "Undying (Wild Boar remix)" - 4:12

DVD live show from the Glasshouse in Pomona, California

1. "Intro / The Flame That Guides Us Home"
2. "Not I"
3. "Ribcage"
4. "Screams of the Undead"
5. "One Thousand Apologies"
6. "Not Ready to Die"
7. "The Soldier's Song"
8. "I Play Dead"
9. "Fire to My Soul" (featuring Dave Peters of Throwdown)
10. "Infected"
11. "Undying"
12. "Through the Black"
13. "My Heart Strings Come Undone"
14. "Beheaded"

== Appearances ==
- "Not I" was featured on the Killing Floor 2 soundtrack in 2015.

== Notes ==
^{1.}Double Take also includes the studio album Summer of Darkness (2004).

^{2.}Death, a Destination also includes the studio albums Demon Hunter (2002) and Summer of Darkness (2004).
