= Storm the Gates of Hell =

Studio album by Demon Hunter
- Released: November 6, 2007
- Studios: Compound Recording, London Bridge (Seattle, Washington)
- Genres: Metalcore; groove metal; alternative metal
- Length: 51:03; 59:03 (Deluxe and Special Edition)
- Label: Solid State
- Producers: Aaron Sprinkle; Shaun Lopez

Demon Hunter chronology
The Triptych (2005)	Storm the Gates of Hell (2007)	45 Days (2008)

Professional ratings
Review scores
Source	Rating
About.com	3.5/5 stars
Christianity Today	4.5/5 stars
Cross Rhythms	9/10 stars
HM Magazine	Slightly favorable
Jesus Freak Hideout	4.5/5 stars
Revolver	3.5/5 stars
Rhapsody	Favorable
Today's Christian Music Favorable	Favorable

Storm the Gates of Hell is the fourth studio album by American Christian metal band Demon Hunter, released on November 6, 2007. It is the band's last album to feature Don Clark and Ethan Luck.

== Touring and promotion ==
Demon Hunter embarked on the Stronger Than Hell Tour in promotion of the album. The summer tour began in May 2008 and included Living Sacrifice, Oh, Sleeper, The Famine, and Advent.

The album's lead single, "Fading Away," along with the title track and "Carry Me Down," can be heard on the band's official MySpace. A promotional site entitled "A Thread of Light" was made, where one can listen to samples of "Storm the Gates of Hell," "I Am You," and "Fiction Kingdom." Two weeks before its release, the album leaked into P2P networks in its entirety. On November 2, the whole album was put on the Demon Hunter's Myspace page for previewing. Storm the Gates of Hell started at #85 on the Billboard 200, selling nearly 10,500 copies in the first week.

A music video was produced for "Fading Away." It was directed by Zach Merck, known for his previous work with Shadows Fall. The video has found considerable airplay on MTV2's Headbangers Ball. The music video for "Carry Me Down" also aired on MTV2.

== Critical reception ==
The album was met with generally positive views. Ben Hurrell CrossRhythms gave the album nine out of ten stars saying "Since their appearance on a record label compilation in 2002 the band have hit the big time, releasing four albums gaining widespread coverage in the mainstream media as well as Christian circles." About.com gave the album three and a half out of five stars stating, "It's a step forward from their last release. They have really stepped up their songwriting. The tracks are a diverse mix of metallic riffs and warm melodies." Allmusic did not give the album a score, but still praised the album saying, "Demon Hunter sparingly employs more traditional vocals and moody textures throughout the roaring, rapid firestorm of the songs. Even if rock is the 'devil's music,' Demon Hunter aren't afraid to use it to get their point across."

== Track listing ==
All tracks are written by Demon Hunter.

No.	Title	Length
1.	"Storm the Gates of Hell^{[a]}"	2:44
2.	"Lead Us Home^{[a]}"	4:24
3.	"Sixteen^{[a]}" (featuring Bruce Fitzhugh of Living Sacrifice)	5:18
4.	"Fading Away^{[a]}"	4:12
5.	"Carry Me Down^{[a]}^{[b]}"	4:32
6.	"A Thread of Light"	3:35
7.	"I Am You^{[a]}"	4:14
8.	"Incision"	5:04
9.	"Thorns"	4:06
10.	"Follow the Wolves^{[a]}"	3:55
11.	"Fiction Kingdom"	4:53
12.	"The Wrath of God"	4:06
Total length:		51:03

^{a} Live recording appears on both 45 Days (2008) and Live in Nashville (2009)
^{b} Re-recorded for Songs of Death and Resurrection (2021)

Special and deluxe edition bonus tracks
No.	Title	Length
13.	"No Reason to Exist"	3:23
14.	"Grand Finale"	4:37
Total length:		59:03

== Credits ==
Demon Hunter

- Ryan Clark — lead vocals
- Don Clark — rhythm guitar
- Ethan Luck — lead guitar, lap steel guitar
- Jon Dunn — bass guitar
- Timothy "Yogi" Watts — drums

Production and additional musicians

- Bruce Fitzhugh — guest vocals on track 3
- Aaron Sprinkle — keyboards, producer, programming
- Shaun Lopez — rhythm guitar, theremin, production
- Chris Carmichael — strings
- Art direction by Invisible Creature
- Digital editing by Randy Torres
- Mixed by Machine at The Machine Shop (Hoboken, New Jersey)
- Assistant Mixing by Will Putney
- Management by Ryan J. Downey

== Alternate editions ==
Three editions of the album were produced: regular, special, and deluxe.

- The special edition contains a DVD, two bonus songs ("No Reason To Exist" and "Grand Finale"), and special packaging.
- The (limited) deluxe edition contains a DVD with extended footage apart from the Special Edition, two bonus songs ("No Reason To Exist" and "Grand Finale"), exclusive limited packaging including a large format booklet with exclusive studio photos, lyrics, liner notes and more, an exclusive band postcard set, a rare Demon Hunter necklace with a Skull Horn pendant, and a Demon Hunter sticker.

== Awards ==
In 2009, the Deluxe Edition, along with Trenches's The Tide Will Swallow Us Whole and Hawk Nelson's ...Is My Friend albums which were also designed by Invisible Creature, was nominated for a Dove Award for Recorded Music Packaging of the Year at the 40th GMA Dove Awards.
