= Don Clark (musician) =

American musician

- Also known as: Chuck Knuckles
- Born: Donald Christopher Clark; May 30, 1975 (age 51); San Jose, California, United States
- Genres: Heavy Metal, Christian metal
- Occupations: Musician, graphic designer
- Instruments: Guitar, bass guitar, vocals
- Years active: 1992–2009

Donald Christopher Clark (born May 30, 1975) is an American musician and graphic designer. He was the rhythm guitarist and bassist for the Christian metal band, Demon Hunter, which he co-founded with his brother, vocalist Ryan Clark. Before Demon Hunter, Clark was a former guitarist and co-founder of Training for Utopia with Rob Dennler. He appears on Zao's The Lesser Lights of Heaven DVD.

== History ==
Before forming TFU and Demon Hunter, Clark was in a local band called Offset. Offset never recorded anything and was short lived.

Clark then started Training for Utopia with Rob Dennler. Clark formed the band with the Rob Dennler (vocals), Steve Saxby (bass) and Morley Boyer (drums). Dennler left the band in 1996 and Ryan joined the band. The band released an EP, a Split EP, and two studio albums.

He and his brother formed Demon Hunter in 2000 and released their debut album late the following year through Solid State Records. The group would continue to steadily gain exposure throughout the 2000s.

His grandfather, an artist, helped inspire his grandsons' work in graphic design, which is their true day job. Ryan and Don founded Seattle-based Asterik Studio with their friend Demetre Arges in 2000. The design studio has created CD packaging, poster art, web design, and/or merchandise design for hundreds of artists including Poison the Well, Liz Phair, P.O.D., and The White Stripes; however, Clark also notes that he is not a fine artist and that such work is typically outsourced. Based on their design experience, Don and Ryan authored a chapter in the book New Masters of Photoshop, Volume 2 (ISBN 1590593154). In 2007, the brothers had announced that they were leaving Asterik to start Invisible Creature.

Clark was nominated for a Grammy Award for Best Album packaging for The Folds' Secrets Keep You Sick. He lives in Seattle, Washington, with his wife and two children.

On August 12, 2009, in Seattle, Washington, at El Corazón, Demon Hunter announced that Don Clark had left the band to pursue his career in graphic design and to be with his family.

In an interview with Matt Johnson Clark stated that, he, Don & Ryan, and Nathan Burke formed a project called Deathbed Atheist. Clark quit the band to focus on life and work.

In 2015, Clark illustrated the book The Biggest Story: How the Snake Crusher Brings Us Back to the Garden, written by Kevin DeYoung.

== Discography ==
Training for Utopia

- The Falling Cycle EP (1997)
- Plastic Soul Impalement (1998)
- Training for Utopia / Zao (1998 w/ Zao)
- Throwing a Wrench into the American Music Machine (1999)
- Technical Difficulties (2004)

Demon Hunter

- Demon Hunter (2002)
- Summer of Darkness (2004)
- The Triptych (2005)
- Storm the Gates of Hell (2007)

== List of design works ==
Year	Artist	Album	Credit(s)
1996	Focal Point	Neglected (EP)	Layout, design
1996	Focal Point	Suffering of the Masses	Layout, design
1997	Eighteen Visions	Lifeless (EP)	Layout
1997	Torn Apart	Nothing Is Permanent....	Design, layout
1997	Training for Utopia	The Falling Cycle (EP)	Artwork (cover concept)
1997	Unconquered	You Say Moderation, I Scream Prohibition!	Layout
1998	Training for Utopia	Plastic Soul Impalement	Layout, design
1999	Stretch Arm Strong	Rituals of Life	Art direction, design
1999	Through the Eyes of Katelyn	Your Role Model's Dead	Layout, design
1999	Spitfire	The Dead Next Door	Art direction, design
2000	Embodyment	The Narrow Scope of Things	Art direction
2000	AP2	Suspension of Disbelief	Art direction, layout
2001	God Forbid	Determination	Art direction, design
2001	The Juliana Theory	Music from Another Room (EP)	Layout
2001	Various	Happy Christmas Vol. 3	Art direction
2002	Cherryholmes	Dressed for Success	Photography
2002	Soul Embraced	This Is My Blood	Layout, design
2002	Poison the Well	Tear from the Red	Artwork, design
2002	Various	Stafcatorce Soundandculture	Design
2002	Poison the Well	Tear from the Road (DVD)	Artwork, design concept
2006	Atreyu	A Death-Grip on Yesterday	Artwork, layout
2006	Twelve Gauge Valentine	Shock Value	Design
2006	Kutless	Live from Portland	Design
2007	Drop Dead, Gorgeous	"They'll Never Get Me (Word With You)"	Art direction
2007	Various	Country Christmas	Design, illustration
2007	Mnemic	Passenger	Design
2007	John Reuben	Word of Mouth	Design
2007	Jackson Waters	Come Undone	Design
2007	Machine Head	The Blackening	Design (special edition package)
2007	Chasing Victory	Fiends	Design
2007	Chris Cornell	Carry On	Design
2007	Pierce the Veil	A Flair for the Dramatic	Design
2007	Seven Places	Glowing	Design
2007	Drop Dead, Gorgeous	Worse Than a Fairy Tale	Design
2007	Foo Fighters	"The Pretender"	Art direction, design
2007	Foo Fighters	Echoes, Silence, Patience & Grace	Art direction, design
2007	Falling Up	Captiva	Design
2007	Foo Fighters	"Long Road to Ruin"	Art direction, design
2008	Bullet for My Valentine	Scream Aim Fire	Illustration
2008	Advent	Remove the Earth	Design
2008	The Out Circuit	Pierce The Empire With A Sound	Illustration, design
2008	Our Last Night	The Ghosts Among Us	Design
2008	Pennywise	Reason to Believe	Illustration, design
2008	Hawk Nelson	Hawk Nelson...Is My Friend!	Illustration, design
2008	P.O.D.	When Angels & Serpents Dance	Design
2008	Coalesce	0:12 Revolution in Just Listening	Design (reissue)
2008	Since October	This Is My Heart	Design
2008	Inhale Exhale	I Swear...	Design
2008	Kutless	To Know That You're Alive	Design
2008	The Living End	White Noise	Art direction, design
2008	Various	Kurt Cobain: About a Son	Design (CD Packaging)
2008	Starflyer 59	Dial M	Design
2008	The Red Shore	Unconsecrated	Design
2009	Coalesce	Ox	Design
2009	Coalesce	OXEP	Design
2010	Sing It Loud	Everything Collide	Design
2010	The Red Shore	The Avarice of Man	Art direction, design
2010	Young the Giant	Young the Giant	Design
2014	Propaganda	Crimson Cord	Art direction, design
2014	Jackie Hill Perry	The Art of Joy	Art direction, design
