= Extremist (album) =

Studio album by Demon Hunter
- Released: March 18, 2014
- Genre: Metalcore, groove metal, alternative metal
- Length: 50:31
- Label: Solid State
- Producer: Jeremiah Scott, Aaron Sprinkle

Demon Hunter chronology
True Defiance (2012)	Extremist (2014)	Outlive (2017)

Alternate Cover

Singles from Extremist
- 1. "Artificial Light" Released: February 13, 2014; 2. "The Last One Alive" Released: February 25, 2014; 3. "I Will Fail You" Released: April 10, 2014

Extremist is the seventh studio album by American Christian metal band Demon Hunter. The album was released on March 18, 2014 through Solid State. Extremist sold nearly 18,000 copies its first week and debuted at no. 16 on the Billboard 200.

== Background ==
Vocalist Ryan Clark released a five-part video series talking about the album and the album's three singles. Part 1 talks about "Artificial Light" and how his lyrics are used as "ammunition", as well as how "lyrics in heavy metal tend to be a little ignorant". Part 2 is about "The Last One Alive" and how to be steadfast in a world going the opposite direction, describing it as apocalyptic. Part 3 is about "I Will Fail You" and how to be realistic with the expectations you put on another person. Part 4 talks about the album overall and how the band has progressed their sound from album to album and this particular album's "middle-ground sound" with its mellow material. The fifth and final part talks about how the band picked the songs that appeared on the album, mainly "Hell Don't Need Me" and "Gasoline".

The deluxe edition of the album also includes two bonus tracks, "Waste Me" and "Helpless Hope", an 11-minute DVD video montage of the making of the album, and a 7" vinyl record containing acoustic versions of "I Will Fail You" and "Hell Don't Need Me".

On October 30, 2015, Demon Hunter released a digital deluxe edition of Extremist via Solid State Records. It includes two remixes of "The Last One Alive" in addition to the tracks from the standard and deluxe editions.

== Critical reception ==
Professional ratings
Review scores
Source	Rating
About.com	4/5 stars
AllMusic	3.5/5 stars
CCM Magazine	4/5 stars
ChristCore	4/5 stars
Christian Music Zine	4/5 stars
HM Magazine	4/5 stars
Indie Vision Music	5/5 stars
Jesus Freak Hideout	3.5/5 stars
Outburn	8/10
Substream Magazine	4/5 stars

Extremist garnered a largely positive reception from the ratings and reviews of music critics. At CCM Magazine, Matt Conner rated the album four stars out of five, stating that the release "is a driving, diverse set" and their record label "should have a major hit here." James Christopher Monger of AllMusic rated the album three-and-a-half stars, writing that "Extremist may be a tad too bold of a title, but it's still another strong entry into the Demon Hunter discography." At HM Magazine, Collin Simula rated the album four out of five stars, saying that it is a "turning point" album, which is "succinct, deliberate and focused."

Chad Bowar of About.com rated the album four stars out of five, remarking that the band "have delivered an album with a lot of variety" on which possess "plenty of mainstream appeal". At Outburn, Mike Smith rated the album eight out of ten, remarking how at "Seven albums deep, Demon Hunter remains familiar, yet distinct and memorable." Tim Dodderidge of Substream Magazine rated the album four stars out of five, saying that with the release the band have "revitalized their identity." At Indie Vision Music, Lee Brown rated the album a perfect five stars, remarking that how the release "marks that spectacular explosion back onto a scene that the band has long since claimed rulership over."

At Jesus Freak Hideout, three critics reviewed the album, with lead reviewer Michael Weaver giving the release 3-and-a-half out of five. According to Weaver, the release "as a whole, feels a little lacking", but it still "proves that even when this band isn't at their best, they are still better than most." Timothy Estabrooks wrote that the album "is a very good album that is still better than what many other bands are releasing, but it comes in pretty low compared to the rest of Demon Hunter's discography." Mark Rice said the release is "definitely a change of pace for the band, and it will remain to be seen how their fans will receive it."

Anthony Ibarra of ChristCore rated the album four stars out of five, stating that the album creates the sensation of "leaving the listener anxious as to what will come next." At Christian Music Zine, Anthony Peronto rated the album four stars out of five, writing that "Even if the music isn’t as radical as its title suggests, after a few listens Extremist is almost top-tier material for Demon Hunter." Mind Equals Blown's Jeremy Vane-Tempest rated the album an eight out of ten, saying that the release is simply "sublime." At The Christian Music review Blog, Jonathan Kemp rated the album three stars out of five, cautioning that "Extremist is a good record if you want to hear Demon Hunter doing what they have been doing for over a decade, which is putting out solid music", however the release is "just not for those who want a little more from the band."

== Commercial performance ==
Extremist debuted at No. 16 on the Billboard 200 chart and No. 2 on the Christian Albums chart in its first week of release. The album also reached No. 5 on the Top Rock Albums chart, and No. 2 on the Hard Rock Albums chart. The album was the No. 2 most sold on the Independent Albums chart, and the No. 23 most sold on the Digital Albums chart.

== Track listing ==
All tracks are written by Demon Hunter.

No.	Title	Length
1.	"Death"	2:34
2.	"Artificial Light"	4:29
3.	"What I'm Not"	4:00
4.	"The Last One Alive"	4:25
5.	"I Will Fail You^{[a]}"	4:44
6.	"One Last Song"	4:20
7.	"Cross to Bear"	4:29
8.	"Hell Don't Need Me"	4:06
9.	"In Time"	4:58
10.	"Beyond Me"	4:23
11.	"Gasoline"	3:56
12.	"The Heart of a Graveyard^{[a]}"	4:07
Total length:		50:31

^{a} Re-recorded for Songs of Death and Resurrection (2021)

Deluxe edition bonus tracks
No.	Title	Length
13.	"Waste Me"	4:49
14.	"Helpless Hope"	5:36
Total length:		60:46

Digital deluxe edition bonus tracks
No.	Title	Length
15.	"The Last One Alive" (Teminite Remix)	5:41
16.	"The Last One Alive" (The Face Remix)	4:22
Total length:		70:49

Deluxe edition vinyl bonus tracks
No.	Title	Length
15.	"I Will Fail You" (Acoustic)
16.	"Hell Don't Need Me" (Acoustic)

== Personnel ==
Demon Hunter

- Ryan Clark – vocals, design
- Patrick Judge – lead guitar
- Jeremiah Scott – rhythm guitar, producer, drum engineering, engineer
- Jon Dunn – bass
- Timothy "Yogi" Watts – drums

Additional personnel

- Aaron Sprinkle – production, editing, keyboards, programming, strings, vocal engineer, vocal producer
- Zeuss – mixing
- Adam Skatula – A&R
- Troy Glessner – mastering
- Cale Glendening – photography

== Chart performance ==
Chart (2014)	Peak position
US Billboard 200	16
US Christian Albums (Billboard)	2
US Digital Albums (Billboard)	23
US Top Hard Rock Albums (Billboard)	2
US Independent Albums (Billboard)	2
US Top Rock Albums (Billboard)	5

== Appearances ==
- "Death" was featured on the Killing Floor 2 soundtrack in 2015.
