= 45 Days =

2008 album by Demon Hunter

Live album by Demon Hunter
- Released: November 25, 2008
- Recorded: June 26, 2008
- Genres: Alternative metal, metalcore
- Label: Solid State
- Producers: Ryan Clark, Don Clark

Demon Hunter chronology
Storm the Gates of Hell (2007)	45 Days (2008)	Live in Nashville (2009)

Professional ratings
Review scores
Source	Rating
CCM Magazine	3.5/5 stars
Cleveland Leader	Favorable
Cross Rhythms	10/10 stars
HM Magazine	Favorable
Jesus Freak Hideout	4/5 stars
The Fish	Favorable

45 Days is the first live album by American Christian metal band Demon Hunter. The three-disc set, two DVDs and one CD, was released on November 25, 2008. The DVDs of the release consist of a 90-minute documentary on the band, including touring and in depth interviews on the first disc, and an entire live concert on the second disc. The live set was recorded at Rockettown in Nashville, TN on June 26, 2008, during the band's "Stronger Than Hell" tour alongside Living Sacrifice. The included CD will be the music that serves as a soundtrack to the documentary.

== Track listing ==
Live DVD set list
No.	Title	Length
1.	"Intro/Storm the Gates of Hell"	4:11
2.	"Lead Us Home"	4:15
3.	"Ribcage"	4:39
4.	"I Am You"	5:05
5.	"Carry Me Down"	4:31
6.	"Fading Away"	5:03
7.	"The Soldier's Song"	5:55
8.	"Follow the Wolves"	4:50
9.	"Undying"	4:48
10.	"Infected"	3:30
11.	"Sixteen"	5:34
12.	"My Heartstrings Come Undone"	5:41
13.	"The Flame that Guides Us Home/Not I"	5:27
14.	"Not Ready to Die"	5:06
Total length:		68:35

CD track listing (documentary soundtrack)
No.	Title	Length
1.	"Closing In"	2:21
2.	"Turn Loose the Hounds"	4:08
3.	"Ours Alone"	6:35
4.	"The Deep"	2:00
5.	"Dust and Smoke"	3:21
6.	"Purified In the Storm"	7:03
7.	"The Scars We Don't See"	2:48
8.	"Perseverance"	7:23
9.	"Fading Away" (acoustic version)	4:18
10.	"Carry Me Down" (piano version)	4:35
Total length:		44:32

== Credits ==
- Don Clark – rhythm guitar, producer
- Ryan Clark – vocals, producer
- Jon Dunn – bass guitar
- Ethan Luck – guitar
- Timothy "Yogi" Watts – drums
- Patrick Judge – live guitar (Ethan Luck was on tour with Relient K playing drums)
- Cale Glendening – director, photographer, editor
- Jeff Carver – assistant producer
- Ryan Downey – assistant producer
- Brandon Ebel – executive producer

== Awards ==
The album was nominated for a Dove Award for Long Form Music Video of the Year at the 41st GMA Dove Awards.
