= Exile (Demon Hunter album) =

Studio album by Demon Hunter
- Released: October 28, 2022
- Recorded: 2021–2022
- Genres: Christian metal, alternative metal
- Length: 62:02
- Label: Weapons MFG
- Producer: Jeremiah Scott

Demon Hunter chronology
Songs of Death and Resurrection (2021)	Exile (2022)	There Was a Light Here (2025)

Alternate Cover

Singles from Exile
- 1. "Freedom Is Dead" Released: June 4, 2022; 2. "Silence the World" Released: July 1, 2022; 3. "Defense Mechanism" Released: July 15, 2022; 4. "Heaven Don’t Cry" Released: August 6, 2022; 5. "Godless" Released: August 20, 2022; 6. "Master" Released: September 3, 2022

Professional ratings
Review scores
Source	Rating
AllMusic	3/5 stars
Jesus Freak Hideout	3/5 stars

Exile is the eleventh studio album by American Christian metal band Demon Hunter, released through their self-founded record label, Weapons MFG, and the band's first concept album. It was announced for release on September 9, 2022, then delayed to October 28, 2022, due to supply chain issues.

== Background ==
Six singles were released ahead of Exile, including "Silence the World", "Defense Mechanism", and "Godless", featuring vocals from Tom S. Englund (Evergrey) and Max Cavalera (ex-Sepultura, Soulfly), and a guitar solo by Richie Faulkner (Judas Priest) respectively. It marks Faulkner's first studio recording since suffering an aortic rupture and dissection and subsequent 10-hour surgery. Among the track listing was a new recording of the song "Praise the Void", previously released in Demon Hunter's acoustic album Songs of Death and Resurrection a year prior. In conjunction with the album, a four-part comic series written by Ryan Clark was released, and in September the band embarked on an anniversary tour celebrating 20 years since their official debut.

== Chart performance ==
The album sold 6,400 copies in its first week, debuting at No. 200 on the Billboard 200, No. 1 of Top Christian Albums, No. 3 of Top Hard Rock Albums, No. 3 of Top Independent Albums, No. 4 of Top Rock Albums and No. 9 of Top Albums Sales.

== Track listing ==
No.	Title	Length
1.	"Defense Mechanism" (featuring Max Cavalera)	3:37
2.	"Master"	4:07
3.	"Silence the World" (featuring Tom S. Englund)	7:13
4.	"Heaven Don’t Cry"	4:25
5.	"Another Place"	4:16
6.	"Freedom Is Dead"	2:53
7.	"Praise the Void"	5:30
8.	"Revolutions"	5:35
9.	"Chemicals"	6:25
10.	"Godless" (featuring Richie Faulkner)	4:54
11.	"Devotion"	4:59
12.	"Along the Way"	8:08
Total length:		62:02

Deluxe edition
No.	Title	Length
13.	"Sleepwalker"	5:05
14.	"Exile"	3:57
Total length:		71:04

The deluxe also includes six storyline interludes, complete with voiceovers and sound effects.

== Personnel ==
Demon Hunter

- Ryan Clark – lead vocals
- Patrick Judge – lead guitar, keys, programming
- Jeremiah Scott – rhythm guitar, backing vocals, production, engineering, mixing, programming
- Jon Dunn – bass guitar
- Timothy "Yogi" Watts – drums, backing vocals

Additional personnel

- Max Cavalera – additional vocals on "Defense Mechanism"
- Tom S. Englund – additional vocals on "Silence the World"
- Richie Faulkner – lead guitar and solo on "Godless"
- Zeuss – mastering
- Dan Seagrave – album artwork
- Randy Torres – storyline interlude sound design (for Deluxe Edition)
- Joanna Ott - backing vocals and piano (Praise the Void)
- Samantha Philyaw – voice of Hunter Woodson (for Deluxe Edition sound interludes)
- Loren Tew – gang vocals
