= Peace (Demon Hunter album) =

Studio album by Demon Hunter
- Released: March 1, 2019
- Recorded: 2018
- Genre: Alternative metal, heavy metal
- Length: 50:02
- Label: Solid State
- Producer: Jeremiah Scott

Demon Hunter chronology
War (2019)	Peace (2019)	Songs of Death and Resurrection (2021)

Singles from Peace
- 1. "Peace" Released: December 14, 2018; 2. "Recuse Myself" Released: January 18, 2019; 3. "More Than Bones" Released: February 8, 2019

Professional ratings
Review scores
Source	Rating
Jesus Freak Hideout	4/5 stars
Jesus Freak Hideout	3.5/5 stars

Peace is the tenth studio album by American Christian metal band Demon Hunter. The album, together with War, was released by Solid State Records on March 1, 2019. The album has a softer style compared to War, being more melodic and rock-influenced. The band released multiple singles before the album was released, including "Recuse Myself". Loudwire named both albums together as one of the 50 best metal albums of 2019.

== Musical style ==
Lead singer Ryan Clark indicated that each of the two albums (War and Peace) are "devoted to their contrasting musical styles - heavy and melodic."

Both albums were professionally reviewed in the Jesus Freak Hideout website. In the Peace review, reviewer Wayne Myatt said that even though the album is not of the band's best, "it is a good album that should please most Demon Hunter and hard rock fans."

== Track listing ==
All tracks are written by Ryan Clark and Patrick Judge.

No.	Title	Length
1.	"More Than Bones"	4:15
2.	"I Don't Believe You"	4:48
3.	"Loneliness^{[a]}"	5:15
4.	"Peace"	4:18
5.	"When the Devil Come"	4:41
6.	"Time Only Takes"	4:38
7.	"Two Ways"	4:07
8.	"Recuse Myself"	5:00
9.	"Bet My Life"	4:16
10.	"Fear Is Not My Guide"	4:47
Total length:		46:06

^{a} Re-recorded for Songs of Death and Resurrection (2021)

Deluxe edition bonus track
No.	Title	Length
11.	"Tear You Down"	3:55
Total length:		50:02

== Personnel ==
Demon Hunter

- Ryan Clark – vocals
- Patrick Judge – lead guitar
- Jeremiah Scott – rhythm guitar
- Jon Dunn – bass
- Timothy "Yogi" Watts – drums

Additional personnel

- Zeuss – mixing and mastering
- Joanna Ott – piano on "Fear Is Not My Guide"

== Charts ==
Chart (2019)	Peak position
US Billboard 200	61
