= The World Is a Thorn =

Studio album by Demon Hunter
- Released: March 9, 2010
- Recorded: October 5 – December 2009
- Studios: The Compound, Seattle, Washington
- Genres: Metalcore, groove metal, melodic death metal
- Length: 41:34
- Label: Solid State
- Producer: Aaron Sprinkle

Demon Hunter chronology
Live in Nashville (2009)	The World Is a Thorn (2010)	True Defiance (2012)

Singles from The World Is a Thorn
- 1. "Collapsing" Released: February 16, 2010

The World Is a Thorn (also stylized The World Is Λ Thorn) is the fifth studio album by American Christian metal band Demon Hunter, which was released March 9, 2010. The album is described by the band as their "heaviest but most melodic" album yet. The first single, "Collapsing", which features Björn "Speed" Strid of Soilwork, and the title track were approved for sales on Rock Band's Rock Band Network. It is Demon Hunter's only album with rhythm guitarist Ryan Helm.

== Track listing ==
Professional ratings
Review scores
Source	Rating
AllMusic	4/5 stars
Alternative Press	3/5 stars
Cross Rhythms	8/10 stars
Jesus Freak Hideout	Timothy Estabrooks: Scott Fryberger:
Metal Storm	Staff pick
Melodic.net	3/5 stars
New Release Tuesday	4.5/5 stars
PopMatters	8/10 stars
Seattle Weekly	Very highly favorable
Sputnikmusic	2/5

All tracks are written by Demon Hunter.

No.	Title	Length
1.	"Descending Upon Us"	5:30
2.	"LifeWar"	1:52
3.	"Collapsing" (featuring Björn Strid of Soilwork)	3:38
4.	"This Is the Line"	3:59
5.	"Driving Nails"	4:06
6.	"The World Is a Thorn"	2:35
7.	"Tie This Around Your Neck"	3:29
8.	"Just Breathe" (featuring Christian Älvestam of Solution .45)	3:55
9.	"Shallow Water"	3:44
10.	"Feel as Though You Could" (featuring Dave Peters of Throwdown)	3:53
11.	"Blood in the Tears^{[a]}"	4:49
Total length:		41:34

^{a} Re-recorded for Songs of Death and Resurrection (2021)

Deluxe Edition Bonus tracks
No.	Title	Length
12.	"Desire the Pain"	3:57
13.	"Driving Nails" (String Mix)	4:07
Total length:		49:34

Digital Deluxe Edition Bonus tracks
No.	Title	Length
14.	"My Throat Is an Open Grave" (Live Acoustic)	3:58
15.	"Driving Nails" (Live Acoustic)	3:48
16.	"Blood in the Tears" (Live Acoustic)	4:29
17.	"Down in a Hole" (Live Acoustic Alice in Chains cover)	6:20
Total length:		68:02

"Collapsing", "Driving Nails", "Blood In the Tears" and "LifeWar" were released as singles for the album.

== Chart performance ==
The album debuted at No. 39 on the Billboard 200 with first-week sales of 14,000.

=== Weekly charts ===
Chart (2010)	Peak position
US Billboard 200	39
US Rock Albums	6
US Hard Rock Albums	2
US Christian Albums	2

=== Year-end charts ===
Chart (2010)	Position
US Christian Albums	49

== Awards ==
The album was nominated for a Dove Award for Rock Album of the Year, while its deluxe version was nominated for Recorded Music Packaging of the Year at the 42nd GMA Dove Awards.

== Personnel ==
Members

- Ryan Clark – lead vocals
- Patrick Judge – lead & rhythm guitar, backing vocals
- Ryan Helm – rhythm & lead guitar
- Jon Dunn – bass guitar
- Timothy "Yogi" Watts – drums

Production

- Aaron Sprinkle – producer
- Jason Suecof – mixing
- Dan Seagrave – artwork
- Chris Carmichael – strings

Additional musicians

- Christian Älvestam – guest vocals on "Just Breathe"
- Björn Strid – guest vocals on "Collapsing"
- Dave Peters – guest vocals on "Feel as Though You Could"
- Aaron Sprinkle – keyboards, programming
- Elliott Sprinkle – keyboards
- Randy Torres – additional backing vocals

== Appearances ==
- "Collapsing" was featured on the Killing Floor 2 soundtrack in 2015.
