= War (Demon Hunter album) =

Studio album by Demon Hunter
- Released: March 1, 2019
- Recorded: 2018
- Genre: Metalcore; alternative metal
- Length: 47:43
- Label: Solid State
- Producer: Jeremiah Scott

Demon Hunter chronology
Outlive (2017)	War (2019)	Peace (2019)

Singles from War
- 1. "On My Side" Released: December 14, 2018; 2. "The Negative" Released: January 18, 2019; 3. "Ash" Released: February 28, 2019

Professional ratings
Review scores
Source	Rating
Jesus Freak Hideout	4/5 stars
Jesus Freak Hideout	3.5/5 stars

War is the ninth studio album by American Christian metal band Demon Hunter. The album, together with Peace, was released by Solid State Records on March 1, 2019. The band released a string of promotional singles prior to the album's release, including "On My Side", "The Negative", and "Ash".

The album earned 13,000 equivalent album units in its first week, ending March 7 to debut at No. 7 on Billboard's Top Current Albums chart, according to Nielsen Music. The album was No. 55 on the Billboard 200. Loudwire named both albums together as one of the 50 best metal albums of 2019.

== Musical style ==
Vocalist Ryan Clark stated that each of the two albums (War and Peace) "could be devoted to their contrasting musical styles- heavy and melodic."

Both albums were professionally reviewed in the Jesus Freak Hideout website. In the War review, reviewer Scott Fryberger said that as much as he likes "Demon Hunter's brand of hard rock, the feature presentation is still in their metalcore", with some songs keeping its musical aspect.

== Track listing ==
All tracks are written by Ryan Clark and Patrick Judge.

No.	Title	Length
1.	"Cut to Fit"	4:41
2.	"On My Side"	4:04
3.	"Close Enough"	4:07
4.	"Unbound"	3:14
5.	"Grey Matter"	4:18
6.	"The Negative"	4:10
7.	"Ash"	3:00
8.	"No Place for You Here"	3:44
9.	"Leave Me Alone"	5:50
10.	"Lesser Gods"	5:15
Total length:		42:13

Deluxe edition bonus track
No.	Title	Length
11.	"Gunfight"	5:30
Total length:		47:43

== Personnel ==
Demon Hunter

- Ryan Clark – vocals
- Patrick Judge – lead guitar, keys
- Jeremiah Scott – rhythm guitar, production
- Jon Dunn – bass
- Timothy "Yogi" Watts – drums

Additional personnel

- Zeuss – mixing and mastering

== Charts ==
Chart (2019)	Peak position
US Billboard 200	55
