= Vol. 1 (We Are The Becoming album) =

Studio album by The Becoming
- Released: September 30, 2008
- Genres: Christian rock, gothic rock
- Length: 55:45
- Label: Tooth & Nail

The Becoming chronology
debut album	Vol. 1

Professional ratings
Review scores
Source	Rating
Jesus Freak Hideout	3/5 stars
Sputnikmusic	4/5 stars

Vol. 1 is the first full-length studio album released by the Christian rock band The Becoming. The album was released by Tooth & Nail Records on September 30, 2008.

== Track listing ==
1. "Dressed in Black"
2. "The One to Hurt You"
3. "Our First Sunrise"
4. "I Cry"
5. "Silent as the Grave"
6. "The Night That Has No Morning"
7. "We're Already Dead"
8. "Your Love"
9. "Heaven Isn't So Far"
10. "Somebody Didn't Come Home Last Night"
11. "Escape You"
12. "We Close Our Eyes"
13. "Under the Full Eclipse"
