= Plead the Widow's Cause =

American indie band

- Origin: New Jersey, United States
- Genres: indie rock; heavy metal; rock; post hardcore; Christian/gospel; Christian rock
- Years active: 2022–present
- Label: Independent
- Members: Ian Kelly; Matt Cummings; Brett Wanamaker; Bill Finocchiaro; Mitchell Layton

Plead the Widow's Cause is an American indie heavy metal and post hardcore band from Southern New Jersey.

== Career ==
The band was formed in 2022. Their name is derived of the Bible passage Isaiah 1:16–17, which says, "Wash and make yourselves clean. Take your evil deeds out of my sight; stop doing wrong. Learn to do right; seek justice. Defend the oppressed. Take up the cause of the fatherless; plead the case of the widow."

On February 18, 2022, Plead the Widow's Cause released their independent debut studio album, Pain Split, to CD, LP, digital download, and streaming formats. In 2024, they released an acoustic extended play of Pain Split. On March 7, 2025, the band released their second independent studio album, Silver Glass Stare, on CD, digital download, and streaming formats.

== Members ==
- Ian Kelly – lead vocals (2022–present)
- Matt Cummings – guitar (2022–present)
- Brett Wanamaker – guitar (2022–present)
- Bill Finocchiaro – drums/percussion (2024–present)
- Mitchell Layton – bass guitar (2024–present)

== Discography ==
=== Studio albums ===
Title	Details
Pain Split	Released: February 18, 2022; Label: independent; Formats: CD, LP, digital download, streaming
Silver Glass Stare	Released: March 7, 2025; Label: independent; Formats: CD, digital download, streaming
"—" denotes a recording that did not chart or was not released in that territory.

=== Extended plays ===
Title	Details
Pain Split (acoustic)	Released: 2024; Label: independent; Formats: CD, digital download
"—" denotes a recording that did not chart or was not released in that territory.
