= Outlive (album) =

Studio album by Demon Hunter
- Released: March 31, 2017
- Recorded: 2016
- Genre: Metalcore, heavy metal, hard rock
- Length: 49:56
- Label: Solid State
- Producer: Jeremiah Scott, Aaron Sprinkle

Demon Hunter chronology
Extremist (2014)	Outlive (2017)	War (2019)

Deluxe Edition

Singles from Outlive
- 1. "Cold Winter Sun" Released: December 9, 2016; 2. "Died in My Sleep" Released: February 17, 2017; 3. "Half as Dead" Released: March 10, 2017; 4. "Raining Down" Released: March 31, 2017

Professional ratings
Review scores
Source	Rating
Indie Vision Music	4/5
Jesus Freak Hideout	4/5 stars
Metal Injection	7.5/10
New Noise Magazine	4.5/5 stars
Mind Equals Blown	6.5/10

Outlive is the eighth studio album by American Christian metal band Demon Hunter. The album was released by Solid State Records on March 31, 2017. The work was funded through PledgeMusic, with "Cold Winter Sun" broadcast prior to the showing for all album tracks.

== Musical style ==
In addition to the band's usual metalcore style, Metal Injection reviewer Aaron said that "as Outlive unfolds, traces of rock, death metal, groove metal, thrash metal and goth can be heard, complemented by melodic undertones that add to the accessibility and memorability of each song."

== Track listing ==
No.	Title	Length
1.	"Trying Times"	2:23
2.	"Jesus Wept"	2:44
3.	"Cold Winter Sun"	3:25
4.	"Died in My Sleep"	4:43
5.	"Half as Dead"	4:00
6.	"Cold Blood"	4:25
7.	"One Step Behind"	5:09
8.	"Raining Down"	3:44
9.	"The End"	4:39
10.	"One Less"	3:24
11.	"Patience"	5:19
12.	"Slight the Odds"	6:01
Total length:		49:56

Deluxe edition
No.	Title	Length
13.	"A Fear I Used to Know"	4:16
14.	"Savage"	4:50
Total length:		59:02

== Personnel ==
Demon Hunter

- Ryan Clark – vocals
- Patrick Judge – lead guitar, gang vocals, keys
- Jeremiah Scott – rhythm guitar, production, keys
- Jon Dunn – bass
- Timothy "Yogi" Watts – drums

Additional personnel

- Chris Carmichael – strings on "Slight the Odds"
- Aaron Sprinkle – additional editing, additional vocal production
- Rocky Gray – additional percussion
- Brad Hartley, Brandon Earl, Brian Shorter, Bruce Fitzhugh, Dustinn Lowry, and Stephen Schofield – gang vocals
- Bruce Fitzhugh – backing vocals
- Zeuss – mixing and mastering

== Charts ==
Chart (2017)	Peak position
US Billboard 200	25
US Independent Albums (Billboard)	1
US Top Hard Rock Albums (Billboard)	2
US Top Rock Albums (Billboard)	2
