= Ryan Clark (musician) =

American musician (born 1979)

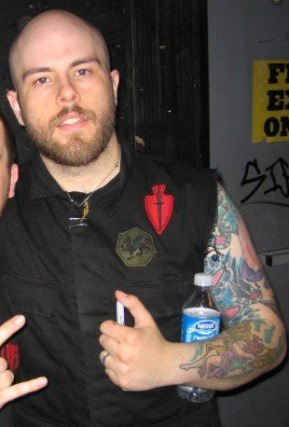
- Clark in 2008

Background information
- Also known as: Maven
- Born: Ryan Curtis Clark; June 23, 1979 (age 47); Woody, California, U.S.
- Genres: Christian metal; metalcore; alternative metal; nu metal; hardcore punk; groove metal
- Occupations: Singer, musician, graphic designer
- Instruments: Vocals, guitar
- Years active: 1992–present

Ryan Curtis Clark (born June 23, 1979) is an American musician who also has performed under the stage name Maven. He is best known as the lead vocalist of the Christian metal band Demon Hunter, which he co-founded with his brother, guitarist Don Clark. He was also the frontman for Christian metalcore band Training for Utopia along with being one of the guitarists for Focal Point. He is featured on Zao's The Lesser Lights of Heaven DVD and Mark Salomon's podcast, Never Was.

== History ==
Before Demon Hunter, Clark was a guitarist for the short-lived Sacramento/Elk Grove, California-based hardcore punk band Focal Point. Focal Point started in 1995 with the lineup of Clark, Robbie Imrisek (Vocals), Danny Dinh (Guitar), Kyle Brown (Bass), and Robert Torres (Drums). The band released a 7-inch via Life Sentence Records titled Neglected and a Studio album via Tooth and Nail Records.

Clark, then known as Maven, was the second vocalist for Training for Utopia. Don formed the band with the Rob Dennler (vocals), Steve Saxby (bass) and Morley Boyer (drums). Dennler left the band in 1996 and Clark joined the band. The band released an EP, a Split EP, and two studio albums.

He and his brother formed Demon Hunter in 2000 and released their debut album late the following year through Solid State Records. The group would continue to steadily gain exposure throughout the 2000s.

His grandfather, an artist, helped inspire his grandsons' work in graphic design, which is their true day job. Ryan and Don founded Seattle-based Asterik Studio with their friend Demetre Arges in 2000. The design studio has created CD packaging, poster art, web design, and/or merchandise design for hundreds of artists including Liz Phair, P.O.D., and The White Stripes; however, Clark also notes that he is not a fine artist and that such work is typically outsourced. Based on their design experience, Don and Ryan authored a chapter in the book New Masters of Photoshop, Volume 2 (ISBN 1590593154). In 2007, the brothers had announced that they were leaving Asterik to start Invisible Creature, an illustration and graphic design studio. Ryan Clark is also art director of Solid State Records and its parent Tooth & Nail Records.

He has twice been nominated for a Grammy Award for his design work on Norma Jean's O God, the Aftermath and Fair's album The Best Worst-Case Scenario.

He currently is working on three side projects. One such project is with former Project 86 guitarist Randy Torres called NYVES. using funding through Kickstarter. In an interview with Billy Power, Matt Johnson (formerly of Blenderhead, The Out Circuit), said that he, Ryan, Don, and Johnson's brother-in-law, Nathan Burke (formerly of Frodus, The Out Circuit) and at one point, Sean Ingram (Coalesce) formed another project which was titled, Deathbed Atheist. The final project is a band with Jason Martin and originally Steven Dail who later quit, of Starflyer 59 called Low & Behold which released their debut album, Uppers in 2015 via Northern Records.

== Bands ==
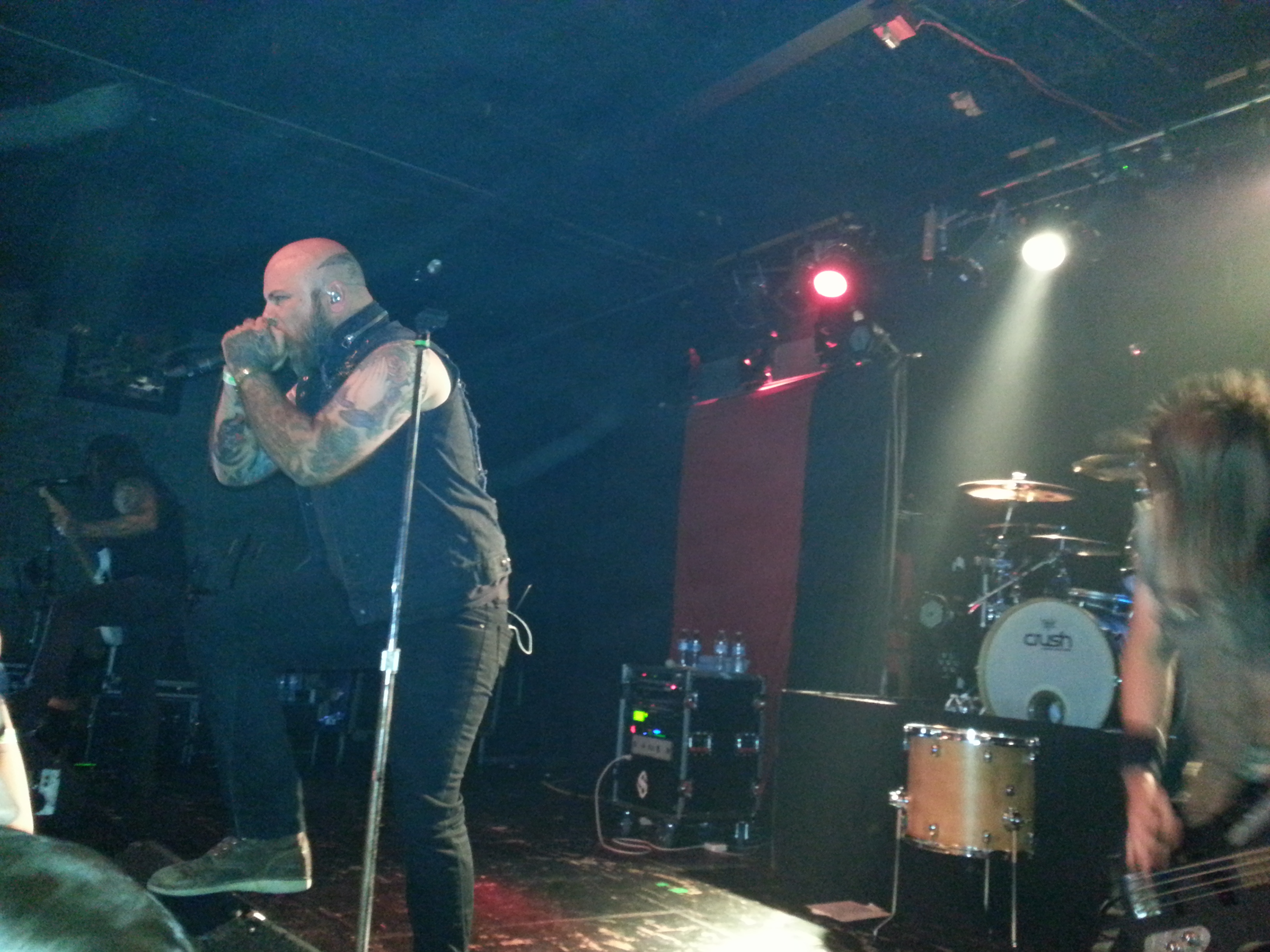
Clark performing with Demon Hunter in 2014

Current

- Demon Hunter – vocals (2000–present), guitar (2000–2002)
- Low & Behold – vocals (2010–present)
- NYVES – vocals (2014–present)

Former

- Focal Point – guitar (1995–1997)
- Training for Utopia – vocals, guitar (1996–2000)
- Deathbed Atheist – guitar (2015–2017)

== Discography ==
Focal Point

- Neglected EP (1996)
- Suffering of the Masses (1996)

Training for Utopia

- The Falling Cycle EP (1997)
- Plastic Soul Impalement (1998)
- Training for Utopia / Zao (1998 w/ Zao)
- Throwing a Wrench into the American Music Machine (1999)
- Technical Difficulties (2004)

Demon Hunter

- Demon Hunter (2002)
- Summer of Darkness (2004)
- The Triptych (2005)
- Storm the Gates of Hell (2007)
- The World Is a Thorn (2010)
- True Defiance (2012)
- Extremist (2014)
- Outlive (2017)
- War (2019)
- Peace (2019)
- Songs of Death and Resurrection (2021)
- Exile (2022)
- There Was a Light Here (2025)

Low & Behold

- Blood Red (2011)
- Uppers (2015)

NYVES

- Anxiety (2015)
- Pressure (EP) (2016)

=== Guest appearances ===
As Maven

- Zao – Training for Utopia / Zao (1998) (guest vocals – "Skin Like Winter")

As Ryan Clark

- Kutless – Sea of Faces (2004) (guest vocals – "Let You In")
- Falling Up – Crashings (2004) (guest vocals – "Jackson 5")
- Anberlin – Never Take Friendship Personal (2005) (guest vocals – "Never Take Friendship Personal")
- Becoming the Archetype – Terminate Damnation (2005) (guest vocals – "Elegy: Deception/Lament/Triumph")
- Advent – Remove The Earth (2008) (guest vocals – "Hanging the Giants")
- Becoming the Archetype – Dichotomy (2008) (guest vocals – "Dichotomy (The Tower)")
- Trenches – The Tide Will Swallow Us Whole (2008) (guest vocals – "Calling")
- Sleeping Giant – Sons of Thunder (2009) (guest vocals – "Army of the Chosen One")
- Nine Lashes – World We View (2012) (guest vocals – "Our Darkest Day")
- Impending Doom – Baptized In Filth (2012) (guest vocals – "My Light Unseen")
- Living Sacrifice – Ghost Thief (2013) (guest vocals – "Screwtape")
- Monsterns – (2013) (guest vocals – "Monster Life")
- Shonlock – A Night to Remember (2014) (guest vocals – "Don't Play")
- Five Finger Death Punch – The Wrong Side of Heaven and the Righteous Side of Hell Volume 1 & 2 Ultimate Collector's Box Set (2014) (guest vocals – "Weight Beneath My Sin" (alternate version))
- Sleeping Giant – I Am (2018) (guest vocals – "Fly. Fight. Crow.")
- The Out Circuit – Enter the Ghost (2018) (guest vocals – "Book of the Void")
- Set the Sun – In Absentia, Vol. 1 (2021) (guest vocals – "Invisible")
- Becoming the Archetype – Children of the Great Extinction (2022) (guest vocals – "The Ruins")
- HolyName – HolyName (2023) (guest vocals – "The Sect")
- Spoken - Reflection (2024) (guest vocals - "Sleeper")
- Set the Sun – Falling Apart (single) (2025) (guest vocals - "Falling Apart")
- HolyName - Rock Against Traffic (Live in Pomona) (2025) (guest vocals – "The Sect")

== List of design works ==
Year	Artist	Album	Credit(s)
1999	Death by Stereo	If Looks Could Kill, I'd Watch You Die	Photography
2001	Papa Roach	"Between Angels and Insects"	Photography
2002	Ill Harmonics	Take Two	Photography
2002	Pedro the Lion	Control	Layout, design, illustration
2003	Saxon Shore	Four Months of Darkness	Artwork (design)
2004	Throwdown	Together. Forever. United. (DVD)	Artwork
2005	Mae	The Everglow	Illustration
2005	Emery	The Question	Art direction, design
2006	He Is Legend	Suck Out the Poison	Design
2006	Dead Poetic	Vices	Design
2006	Jeremy Camp	Beyond Measure	Design
2006	Inhale Exhale	The Lost. The Sick. The Sacred.	Design
2007	The Brothers Martin	The Brothers Martin	Design, illustration
2007	Anberlin	Cities	Design
2007	Haste the Day	Pressure the Hinges	Illustration, design
2007	Joy Electric	The Otherly Opus	Design (sleeve)
2007	The Chariot	The Fiancée	Design
2007	Becoming the Archetype	The Physics of Fire	A&R, design
2007	Neon Horse	Neon Horse	Design
2007	Sullivan	Cover Your Eyes	Design
2007	August Burns Red	Messengers	Design
2007	MxPx	Secret Weapon	Design
2007	Throwdown	Venom & Tears	Design
2007	Cry of the Afflicted	The Unveiling	Design
2007	Thousand Foot Krutch	The Flame in All of Us	Design
2007	Emery	I'm Only a Man	Design
2007	Oh, Sleeper	When I Am God	Design
2007	The Agony Scene	Get Damned	Illustration, design
2007	Demon Hunter	Storm the Gates of Hell	Design
2007	Anberlin	Lost Songs	Design
2007	Dead Poetic	The Finest (Compilation)	Design
2008	Number One Gun	The North Pole Project	Design
2008	Secret and Whisper	Great White Whale	Design
2008	The Presidents of the United States of America	These Are the Good Times People	Layout, design
2008	Chris Taylor	Take Me Anywhere	Design
2008	Run Kid Run	Love at the Core	Artwork
2008	Showbread	Nervosa	Design
2008	Joy Electric	My Grandfather, The Cubist	Design
2008	Bon Voyage	Lies	Design
2008	Capital Lights	This Is an Outrage!	Design
2008	Sever Your Ties	Safety In The Sea	Design
2008	The Showdown	Back Breaker	Design
2008	Underoath	Lost in the Sound of Separation	Design concept (deluxe edition)
2008	Trenches	The Tide Will Swallow Us Whole	Design
2008	The Becoming	Vol. 1	Design
2008	Copeland	You Are My Sunshine	Design
2008	Haste the Day	Dreamer	Illustration, design
2008	Theocracy	Mirror of Souls	Artwork
2008	Becoming the Archetype	Dichotomy	A&R, design
2008	Jeremy Camp	Speaking Louder Than Before	Design
2009	Joy Electric	Early Cubism (EP)	Art direction
2009	And Then There Were None	Who Speaks for Planet Earth?	Design
2009	Falling Up	Fangs!	Illustration, design
2009	Pomegranates	Everybody Come Outside	Design
2009	The Chariot	Wars and Rumors of Wars	Design
2009	The Crucified	The Complete Collection	Design
2009	August Burns Red	Constellations	Design, illustration
2009	DevilDriver	Pray for Villains	Design, illustration
2009	Neon Horse	Haunted Horse: Songs of Love, Defiance, and Delusion	Design, illustration
2009	Advent	Naked and Cold	Design
2009	Boys Like Girls	Love Drunk	Design
2009	Thousand Foot Krutch	Welcome to the Masquerade	Art direction, design
2009	Hawk Nelson	Live Life Loud	Design
2009	Inhale Exhale	Bury Me Alive	Design, illustration
2009	Wolfmother	Cosmic Egg	Design
2009	Joy Electric	Favorites at Play	Design
2009	The Crucified	The Pillars of Humanity	Design, illustration (reissue)
2010	Living Sacrifice	The Infinite Order	Layout
2010	Fair	Disappearing World	Design
2010	Wolfmother	"White Feather"	Design
2010	Black Breath	Heavy Breathing	Layout (consultation)
2010	Secret and Whisper	Teenage Fantasy	Design
2010	Bleeding Through	Bleeding Through	Art direction, illustration, design
2010	Sent by Ravens	Our Graceful Words	Design
2010	Write This Down	Write This Down	Design
2010	The Letter Black	Hanging On by a Thread	Design
2010	Since October	Life, Scars, Apologies	Art direction, design
2010	Coliseum	House with a Curse	Cover (photo manipulation)
2010	Starflyer 59	The Changing of the Guard	Design
2010	The Showdown	Blood in the Gears	Design
2010	August Burns Red	Home	Illustration, design
2010	Bebo Norman	Ocean	Art direction, design
2010	Monster Magnet	Mastermind	Illustration, design
2010	Haste the Day	Concerning the Way It Was (Compilation)	Art direction, design
2010	As They Sleep	Dynasty	Design
2011	I Am Empire	Kings	Design
2011	Hawk Nelson	Crazy Love	Design
2011	DevilDriver	Beast	Design
2011	Becoming the Archetype	Celestial Completion	Design
2011	Emery	We Do What We Want	Design
2011	FM Static	My Brain Says Stop, But My Heart Says Go!	Design
2011	Atmosphere	The Family Sign	Art direction, design
2011	Hyland	Weights & Measures	Design
2011	Sleeping with Sirens	Let's Cheers to This	Design
2011	The Chariot	Before There Was	Design
2011	Thousand Foot Krutch	Live at the Masquerade	Art direction, design
2011	August Burns Red	Leveler	Design
2011	Grieves	Together/Apart	Art direction, illustration, design
2011	Queensrÿche	Dedicated to Chaos	Design
2011	Earth Crisis	Neutralize the Threat	Design
2011	Every Avenue	Bad Habits	Design
2011	Icon for Hire	Scripted	Design
2011	Low & Behold	"Blood Red"	Design
2012	Blessed by a Broken Heart	Feel the Power	Design
2012	Nine Lashes	World We View	Design
2012	Demon Hunter	True Defiance	Design
2012	The Letter Black	Hanging On By a Remix	Design
2012	To Speak of Wolves	Find Your Worth, Come Home	Design
2012	Write This Down	Lost Weekend	Design
2012	The Overseer	We Search, We Dig	Design
2012	P.O.D.	Murdered Love	Design, illustration
2012	Abandoned Pools	Sublime Currency	Design
2012	The Amity Affliction	Chasing Ghosts	Design
2012	Poema	Remembering You	Design
2012	August Burns Red	Sleddin' Hill, A Holiday Album	Design
2012	Matt & Toby	Matt & Toby	Design
2012	Hyland	Finding Our Way	Artwork
2012	Bebo Norman	Lights of Distant Cities	Design
2012	Underoath	Anthology: 1999–2013	Art direction, design
2013	Starflyer 59	IAMACEO	Artwork
2013	Fit for a King	Creation/Destruction	Design
2013	I Am Empire	Anchors	Design
2013	All Things New	All Things New	Art direction, design
2013	Alice in Chains	The Devil Put Dinosaurs Here	Art direction, design
2013	Sleeping with Sirens	Feel	Art direction, design
2013	August Burns Red	Rescue & Restore	Design, illustration
2013	My Heart to Fear	Algorithm	Design
2013	Rosetta	The Anaesthete	Design (band logo
2013	DevilDriver	Winter Kills	Design
2013	Tonight Alive	The Other Side	Design
2013	Monster Magnet	Last Patrol	Design
2013	Living Sacrifice	Ghost Thief	Design
2013	Fit for a King	Descendants (Redux)	Design
2014	Throwdown	Intolerance	Design, illustration
2014	Of Mice & Men	Restoring Force	Design, photography
2014	Demon Hunter	Extremist	Art direction, design, photography
2014	Memphis May Fire	Unconditional	Photography, design
2014	Killer Be Killed	Killer Be Killed	Art direction, design
2014	Cush	SP3	Design
2014	Tedashii	Below Paradise	Design
2014	The Atlas Moth	The Old Believer	Design
2014	Anberlin	Lowborn	Artwork (Fig. 2: In Summation)
2014	Wovenwar	Wovenwar	Art direction, design
2014	Trip Lee	Rise	Design
2014	Monster Magnet	Milking the Stars: A Re-Imagining of Last Patrol	Design
2014	White Lighter	White Lighter	Artwork
2015	Sleeping with Sirens	Madness	Design
2015	NYVES	Anxiety	Art direction, design
2015	Coal Chamber	Rivals	Design
2015	August Burns Red	Found in Far Away Places	Art direction, design
2015	Saint Asonia	Saint Asonia	Art direction, design
2015	Bullet for My Valentine	Venom	Art direction, design
2015	Jeremy Camp	3CD Collection	Design (CDs 1 and 2)
2015	Low & Behold	Uppers	Art direction, design
2016	Starflyer 59	Slow	Artwork
2016	Wovenwar	Honor Is Dead	Art direction, design
2016	David Bazan	Christmas Bonus (EP)	Design
2017	Aaron Sprinkle	Real Life	Design
2017	Demon Hunter	Outlive	Design
2017	Stone Sour	Hydrograd	Design
2017	Lo Tom	Lo Tom	Design
2017	Starflyer 59	"Terror"	Artwork
2017	August Burns Red	Phantom Anthem	Art direction, design
2018	Evidence	Weather or Not	Art direction, design
2018	IAMX	Alive In New Light	Art direction, design
2018	Stone Sour	Hydrograd Acoustic Sessions (EP)	Art direction, design
2018	Alice in Chains	Rainier Fog	Art direction, design
2018	Manafest	Stones Reloaded	Art direction, design, photography
2018	Billy Idol	Vital Idol: Revitalized	Design
2019	August Burns Red	Phantom Sessions (EP)	Design (package design)
2019	Death Therapy	Voices	Artwork, design, layout
2019	Starflyer 59	Young in My Head	Art direction, design
2019	Wolves at the Gate	Eclipse	Art direction, design
2019	Starflyer 59	Gold	Design (revisualizing)
2020	IAMX	Echo Echo	Art direction, design
2020	Anchor & Braille	Tension	Art direction, design
2020	Lightworker	Fury by Failure	Art direction, design
2020	Starflyer 59	Miami (EP)	Artwork
2020	Lo Tom	LP2	Design
2020	Slick Shoes	Rotation & Frequency	Design
2020	Acceptance	Wild, Free	Art direction, design
2020	Sevendust	Blood & Stone	Art direction, design
2021	Demon Hunter	Songs of Death and Resurrection	Art direction, design
2021	August Burns Red	Leveler: 10th Anniversary Edition	Design
2021	Alice in Chains	Facelift	Art direction, design (30th Anniversary reissue)
2021	Jerry Cantrell	Brighten	Art direction, illustration, design
2022	Wolves at the Gate	Eulogies	Art direction, design
2022	Demon Hunter	Exile	Art direction, design concept, artwork
2023	Elegant Weapons	Horns for a Halo	Artwork (additional)
2023	Jerry Cantrell	Degradation Trip Volumes 1 & 2	Art direction, design (repackaging)
2023	Sevendust	Truth Killer	Art direction, design
2024	P.O.D.	Veritas	Artwork
2024	Awolnation	The Phantom Five	Art direction, design
2024	Jerry Cantrell	I Want Blood	Art direction, design
2025	Silverstein	Antibloom	Artwork
2025	Demon Hunter	There Was a Light Here	Art direction, design
2025	The Devil Wears Prada	Flowers	Design
2025	Hope Deferred	Darkness Remains	Artwork
