= Live in Nashville (Demon Hunter album) =

Live album by Demon Hunter
- Released: January 27, 2009
- Recorded: June 26, 2008
- Venue: Rocketown in Nashville, Tennessee
- Genre: Alternative metal, metalcore
- Length: 68:35
- Label: Solid State
- Producer: Demon Hunter

Demon Hunter chronology
45 Days (2008)	Live in Nashville (2009)	The World Is a Thorn (2010)

Professional ratings
Review scores
Source	Rating
Cleveland Leader	Favorable
Cross Rhythms	7/10 stars
Jesus Freak Hideout	4/5 stars
Melodic.net	3/5 stars

Live in Nashville is the second live album by American Christian metal band Demon Hunter, released on January 27, 2009. The album is the audio complement to the live DVD featured in Demon Hunter's release "45 Days."

== Track listing ==
No.	Title	Length
1.	"Intro / Storm the Gates of Hell"	4:11
2.	"Lead Us Home"	4:15
3.	"Ribcage"	4:39
4.	"I Am You"	5:05
5.	"Carry Me Down"	4:31
6.	"Fading Away"	5:03
7.	"The Soldier's Song"	5:55
8.	"Follow the Wolves"	4:50
9.	"Undying"	4:48
10.	"Infected"	3:30
11.	"Sixteen"	5:34
12.	"My Heartstrings Come Undone"	5:41
13.	"The Flame That Guides Us Home / Not I"	5:27
14.	"Not Ready to Die"	5:06
Total length:		68:35
