= Demon Hunter (band) =

American metal band

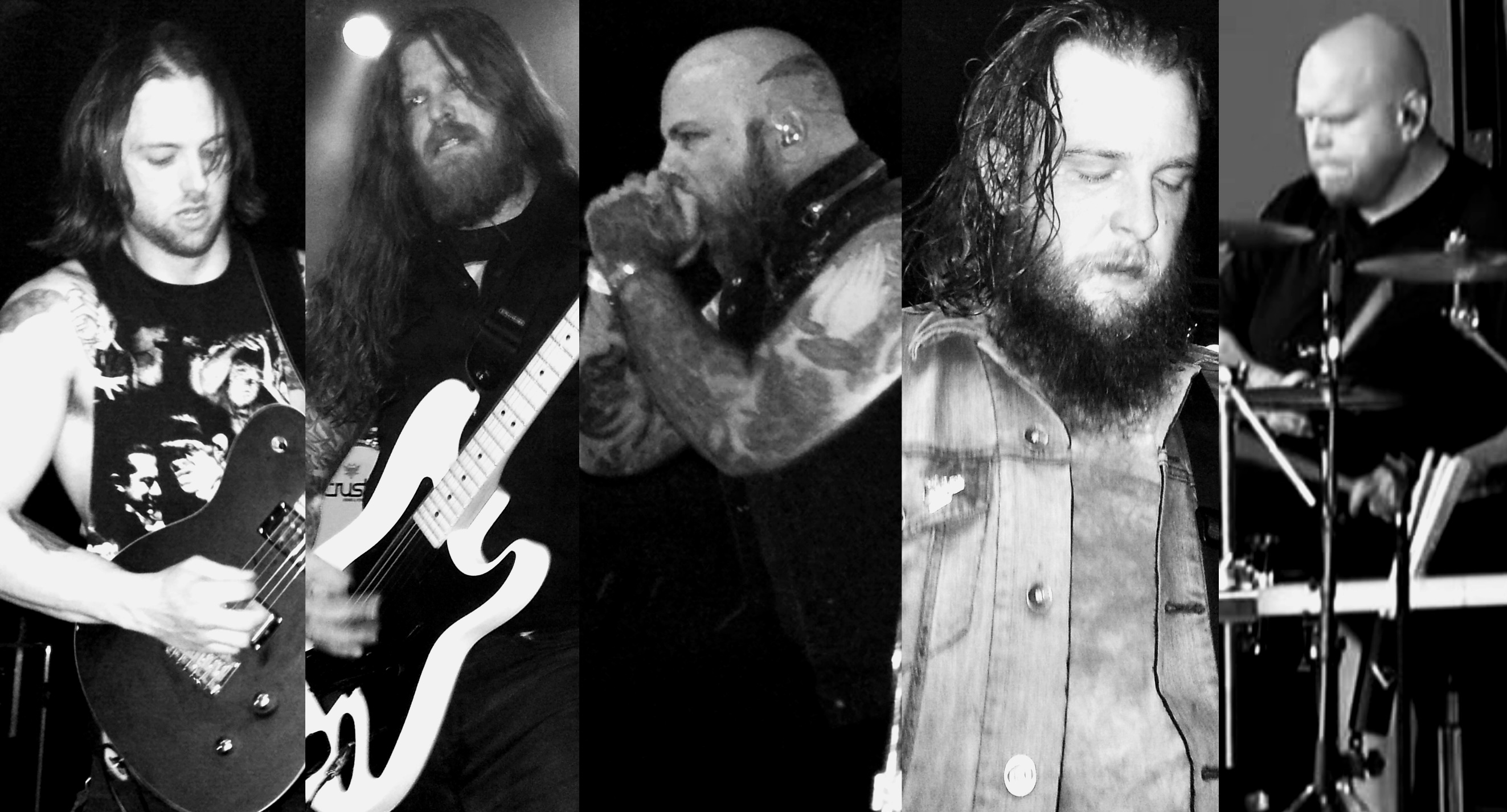
- Demon Hunter's current lineup. L–R: Judge, Scott, Clark, Dunn, and Watts

Background information
- Origin: Seattle, Washington, U.S.
- Genres: Christian metal; metalcore; alternative metal; groove metal
- Years active: 2000–present
- Labels: Solid State, Weapons MFG
- Members: Ryan Clark; Jon Dunn; Timothy "Yogi" Watts; Patrick Judge; Jeremiah Scott
- Past members: Jesse Sprinkle; Kris McCaddon; Don Clark; Ethan Luck; Ryan Helm
- Website: demonhunter.net

Demon Hunter is an American Christian metalcore band from Seattle, Washington that brothers Don Clark and Ryan Clark formed in 2000. Ryan is the band's only remaining original member, as Don left in 2009. As of the 2010s, the band has sold over 600,000 albums.

== History ==
=== 2000s ===
Demon Hunter was conceived as a project band by the Clarks, who had played together in the initially Coalesce and Neurosis-influenced but later more experimental band Training for Utopia. Ryan had played guitar in hardcore band Focal Point, who released a studio album, Suffering of the Masses, on Tooth & Nail Records in 1996, when Ryan was a teenager.

Demon Hunter first appeared on This Is Solid State Vol. 3, released on February 26, 2002, which included a demo of the band's song "Through the Black". Demon Hunter's self-titled debut album was released on October 22, 2002 on the Tooth & Nail Records subsidiary Solid State Records. Ryan and Don wrote all the songs, performed most of the instruments (with Ryan singing as he had in TFU) and hired Jesse Sprinkle, formerly of Poor Old Lu, to record drum tracks.

The band members hid their identities in photos and in the press. Their names were revealed when they undertook their first tour, which featured Norwegian Christian metal band Extol, and death metal-influenced metalcore band The Agony Scene, and after they hired Jesse Sprinkle on drums, Jon Dunn on bass, and Kris McCaddon, formerly of Embodyment and Society's Finest, on lead guitar.

Demon Hunter returned to the studio to record their second full-length release, Summer of Darkness, with McCaddon contributing and Sprinkle drumming. Summer of Darkness hit stores on May 4, 2004, and was a modest success, propelling Demon Hunter into the secular scene, with the addition of the music video "Not Ready to Die" on MTV2's Headbangers Ball and Fuse TV, along with single "My Heartstrings Come Undone" being placed on the Resident Evil: Apocalypse soundtrack. The album featured four guest vocal appearances, including Mike Williams of The Agony Scene on "Beheaded", Brock Lindow of 36 Crazyfists on "Beauty Through The Eyes of a Predator", Howard Jones from Killswitch Engage on "Our Faces Fall Apart", and Trevor McNevan of Thousand Foot Krutch on "Coffin Builder".

Demon Hunter toured that summer with McCaddon on lead guitar and Dunn on bass, along with new touring drummer Timothy "Yogi" Watts, as Sprinkle could not make the tour. This time, Demon Hunter took with them rock/post-hardcore band Dead Poetic, along with metalcore band Haste the Day. Post-hardcore band Staple replaced Haste the Day towards the end of the tour.

In 2005, Demon Hunter went back to The Compound in Seattle, Washington to record their third studio album, The Triptych. The word "triptych" centers around the concept of three, as it was the band's third album. The album includes a cover of Prong's "Snap Your Fingers, Snap Your Neck". This album debuted Watts as Sprinkle's permanent replacement on drums (Jesse having joined Dead Poetic) as well as the addition of Ethan Luck as lead guitarist and backing vocalist, replacing Kris McCaddon. The Triptych sold more than twice as many records on its first week of release as Summer of Darkness had. "Undying" was the band's first single from this album, and was also made into a music video directed by Chris Sims.

Demon Hunter's only 2006 tour took place over the summer with Zao, Becoming the Archetype, August Burns Red, and Spoken. The band shot a video for "One Thousand Apologies" after the tour was over, with director Darren Doane at the helm. The Triptych was re-released on October 31, 2006, with a DVD accompanying the album, and four extra songs added to the original album.

The hard rock and heavy metal based magazine, Revolver, published a cover story on Christian metal in December 2006, featuring what the magazine called "The Holy Alliance": Spencer Chamberlain from Underoath, Ryan Clark from Demon Hunter, Tim Lambesis from As I Lay Dying, and Cory Brandan Putman from Norma Jean.

Demon Hunter entered the studio in June 2007 to record their fourth full-length album, Storm the Gates of Hell, which was released on November 6, 2007. Solid State released three versions of the album with various bonuses. "Fading Away" was the album's first single and music video. In spite of the bands secular popularity, they continued to support the underground Christian metal scene by appearing on obscure radio programs such as The Full Armor of God Broadcast in January 2008. On March 13, 2008, "Carry Me Down" debuted on Headbangers Ball's website as the album's second music video, and made its television premiere on March 15 on the same show.

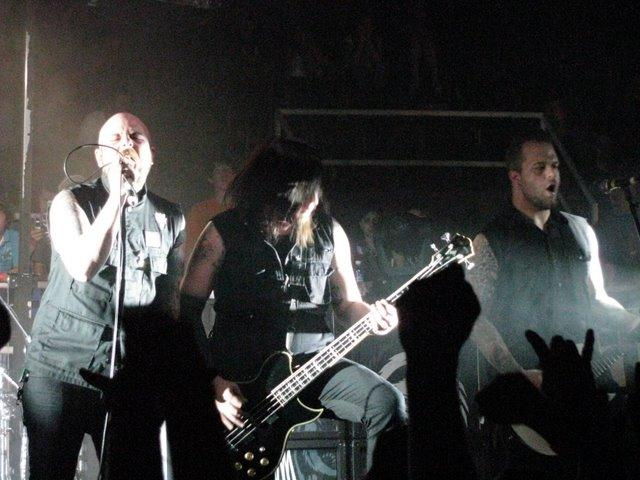
Demon Hunter performing at Red Letter Rock Festival in 2008

In 2008, the band headlined the "Stronger Than Hell" tour, which started May 26 in Seattle, Washington. The tour featured the recently reunited Christian metal forefathers Living Sacrifice, whose lead singer Bruce Fitzhugh was featured as a guest vocalist on Storm the Gates of Hell's track titled "Sixteen". The tour also included Oh, Sleeper, The Famine, and Advent. This tour completed July 5, 2008, at Cornerstone Festival in Bushnell, Illinois. Demon Hunter released 45 Days in November 2008, a box set comprising two DVDs and a CD containing a documentary film about the band and their fans, a pro-shot performance from the "Stronger Than Hell" tour, and a brand new score written exclusively for the film along with two bonus tracks. 45 Days was directed by Cale Glendening.

A live album, Live in Nashville, was released on January 27, 2009; it includes 14 songs from their show in Nashville, Tennessee, from their "Stronger Than Hell" tour. The album features The Showdown lead guitarist Patrick Judge, who filled in for Luck on several of the "Stronger Than Hell" dates due to Luck's conflicting scheduling commitments as drummer for Relient K.

Judge also filled in for Brian Leppke of metalcore band Bleeding Through when he was unable to turn up for the Thrash and Burn tour in May.

In August 2009, Don Clark left the band to pursue his graphic designer career, and to be with his family. Ethan Luck also left, as he could not keep up with the hectic schedule of being in both Demon Hunter and Relient K. On August 28, Demon Hunter released an official statement with a new band photograph, stating that Patrick Judge was the new, permanent replacement for Luck. However, the statement made no mention of Randy Torres's joining the band; a new band photograph included him as well. An official replacement for Don Clark was announced in Demon Hunter's exclusive fan club, The Blessed Resistance, with the announcement of Ryan Helm, formerly of The Ascendicate, as the band's new permanent rhythm guitarist.

=== 2010s ===
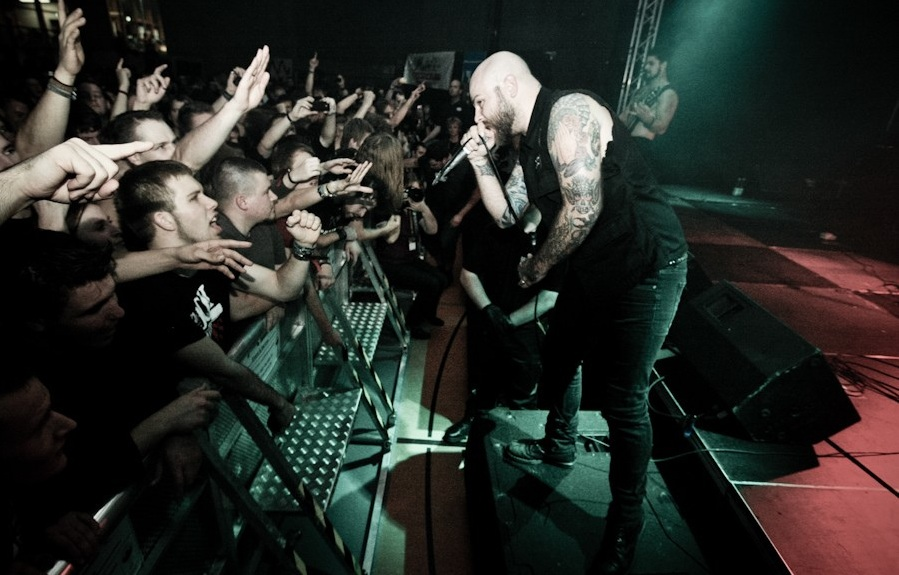
Demon Hunter performing in Gomaringen (2010)

Demon Hunter released The World Is a Thorn, their fifth studio album, on March 9, 2010. It featured guest vocals by Dave Peters of Throwdown in "Feel As Though You Could", Christian Älvestam of Miseration in "Just Breathe", and Björn "Speed" Strid of Soilwork featured in the single "Collapsing". The album debuted at No. 39 on the Billboard 200 with first-week sales of 14,000.

The band joined As I Lay Dying on tour in March, marking the first time Demon Hunter ever toured as a supporting act, rather than the headliner. Blessthefall and War of Ages were also on the bill. Demon Hunter released an anthology of their first three albums on March 8, 2011, titled Death, a Destination. In December 2011, Ryan Helm announced that he would be leaving Demon Hunter to concentrate on his solo project, Damien Deadson. Helm stated that the departure, "was inevitable; however, it was on good terms."

In January 2012, it was announced on the Solid State Records website that Jeremiah Scott, bassist for The Showdown, had joined the band in the position of rhythm guitar.

Their sixth full-length album, True Defiance, released April 10, 2012, was a commercial success, reaching No. 36 on the Billboard 200 and No. 2 on the Top Christian Albums chart; it received generally positive to mixed reviews. A month before the album was released, Demon Hunter released the song "My Destiny" as the first official single from the album and released "Someone to Hate" and "Dead Flowers" as promotional singles. The band also released a deluxe edition of the album that included two bonus songs, "What is Left" and "I Am a Stone".

In July 2012, the band toured for the album along with Bleeding Through, Cancer Bats, and The Plot in You. Not long after, they also announced a tour in the countries of Brazil, Argentina, and Colombia in South America. The band was part of a tour called "Another Year Another Tour", their first tour of 2013, alongside headline act In Flames, as well two other bands, All Shall Perish, and Battlecross.

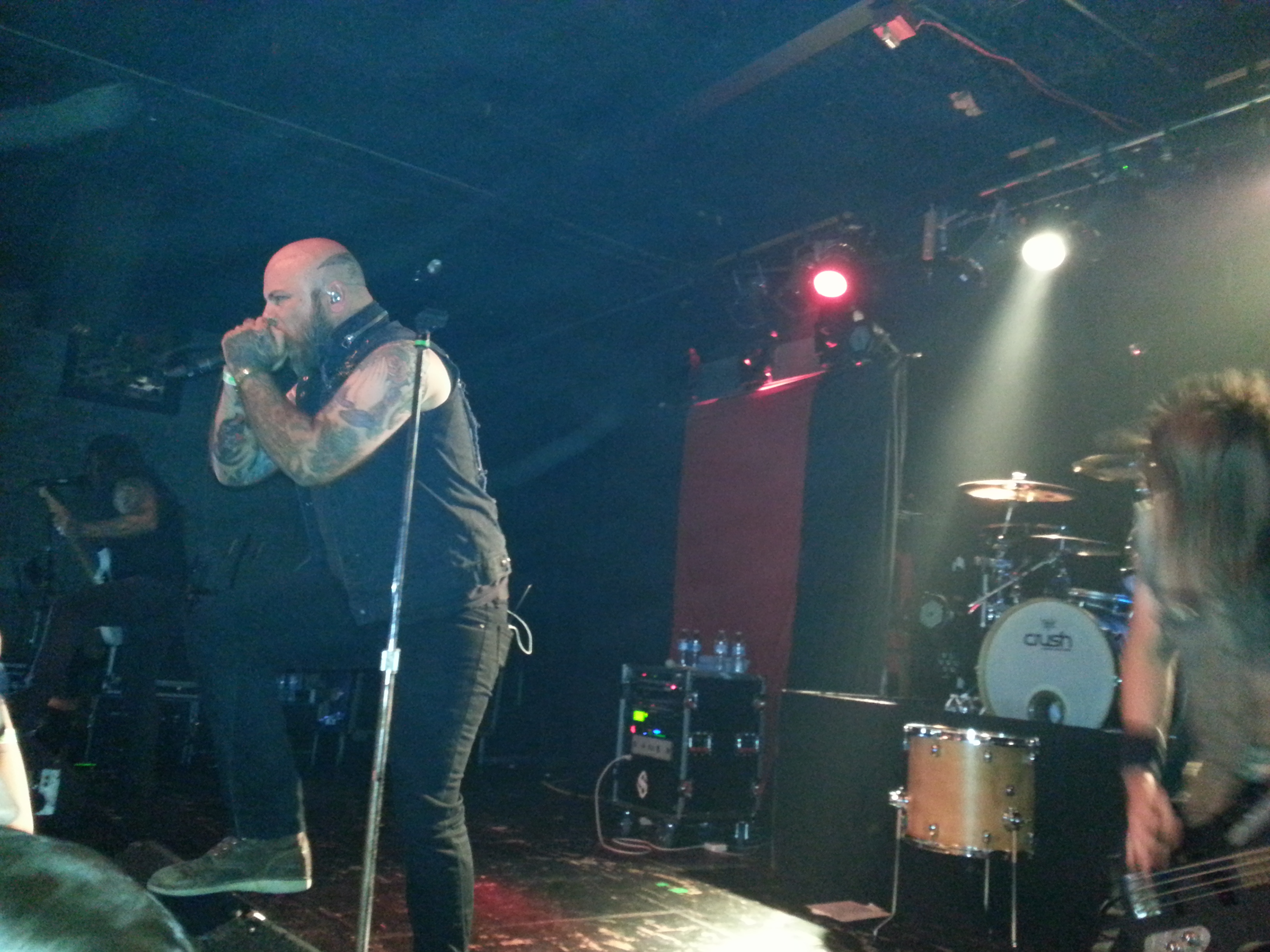
Demon Hunter in 2014

Demon Hunter began releasing teaser posts on January 30, 2014, related to seventh full-length album Extremist, which was released on March 18, 2014. Demon Hunter released the album's first single, "Artificial Light", on their YouTube account February 13, 2014, and also released websites to pre-order their new album. "The Last One Alive", and "I Will Fail You" were eventually released as promotional singles shortly after. Extremist debuted at No. 16 on the Billboard 200 selling approximately 18,000 copies in the first week of release. This is the band's highest chart debut, being 20 steps higher than their highly regarded previous effort, True Defiance which debuted at No. 36.

In August 2014, the band went on a brief tour with Red and Veridia.

The band's first and only concert in 2015 was at Uprise Festival in Shippensburg, Pennsylvania.

Demon Hunter officially released their eighth studio album, Outlive, on Solid State Records on March 31, 2017. In December 2016, they released the first single for Outlive: "Cold Winter Sun". On February 15, 2017, they announced that a music video for their second single "Died In My Sleep" would be released.

On December 3, 2018, the band announced two albums—War and Peace—were scheduled to be released in March 2019. Demon Hunter released both albums on March 1, 2019. On March 16, 2019, the two albums made it into top 5 of the Billboard Christian Albums with War in the second place and Peace in the third place.

=== 2020s ===
On November 10, 2020, the band announced their first acoustic album, Songs of Death and Resurrection, which would feature acoustic renditions of songs such as "Dead Flowers" and "The Heart of a Graveyard", as well as featuring a new song, "Praise the Void", which would be released on March 5, 2021.

On December 15, 2021, it was announced that Richie Faulkner of Judas Priest recorded a guitar solo for Demon Hunter's album, Exile, later announced for release on September 9, 2022, then delayed to October 28, 2022. The band quickly released three singles, "Freedom is Dead", "Silence the World", and "Defense Mechanism", the latter two featuring Tom S. Englund (Evergrey) and Max Cavalera (ex-Sepultura, Soulfly) respectively, all released through their self-founded record label, Weapons MFG.

Demon Hunter started writing a follow-up album to Exile as early as October in 2022, shortly before their new album's release.

On February 10, 2023, the band released a b-side from the Exile recording sessions, "The Brink", which had been an exclusive song to Demon Hunter's fan club, The Blessed Resistance, in 2022.

On October 6, 2023, the band released another single, "Some of Us", currently as a standalone single. This was followed by other standalone singles, "Worlds Apart", on March 1, 2024, and "Black Stained Glass" on May 10, 2024.

On February 7, 2025, alternative rock band Set the Sun released a collaboration with Demon Hunter titled "Falling Apart".

On May 2, 2025, Demon Hunter released the single “I’m Done”, and on June 6, 2025, they released the single “Light Bends”. Another single, “Sorrow Light The Way”, was released on July 4, 2025. On July 28, 2025, the band announced their twelfth studio album, There Was a Light Here, which was released on September 12, 2025.

The band was confirmed to be making an appearance at Welcome to Rockville, which took place in Daytona Beach, Florida in May 2026.

On July 21, 2026, the band announced a tour celebrating the 20th anniversary of their 2007 album Storm the Gates of Hell, with support from Wolves at the Gate and Bloodlines, to begin in the fall.

In August 2026, Demon Hunter's company Hyde Lane opened a trademark lawsuit against Netflix for causing consumers "substantial confusion" due to KPop Demon Hunters and its announcement of a global tour. The lawsuit claims that an unidentified individual accidentally bought tickets to a Demon Hunter concert, thinking it was a KPop show. "Demon Hunter" as a trademark was registered by Hyde Lane in 2022 for recorded music and merchandise.

== Christianity ==
Don Clark stated, "I guess we liked to ride the fence. Then we got a little older, maybe wiser, and you know what, we're a Christian band. We're five dudes, we're all believers, we really don't want to ride the fence anymore." Ryan Clark claimed, "When we officially started we wanted to be very bold about it, we didn't see any purpose of just beating around the bush." According to the band, fans who are Christians are supportive of the band's bold faith position, saying "They respect that we don't walk the fence between a non-Christian and Christian band." Demon Hunter's official website stated in 2008 that they are "absolutely" a Christian band and the band members "are all Bible believing followers of Jesus Christ."

== Reported use by the military ==
According to an Esquire interview in February 2013, after Metallica requested that the US military stop using their music during interrogations in Iraq, Demon Hunter allegedly contacted the US military, offering their music as an alternative, which was accepted. A Navy SEAL who claimed to have killed Bin Laden was quoted as saying "'[W]e stopped using [Metallica's] music, and then a band called Demon Hunter got in touch and said, "We're all about promoting what you do." They sent us CDs and patches. I wore my Demon Hunter patch on every mission. I wore it when I blasted bin Laden.'" The day after the story broke, Demon Hunter addressed the situation by saying they approved US servicemen wearing their patch, but they didn't volunteer their music, nor did they have any knowledge of it being used for interrogations.

== Band members ==
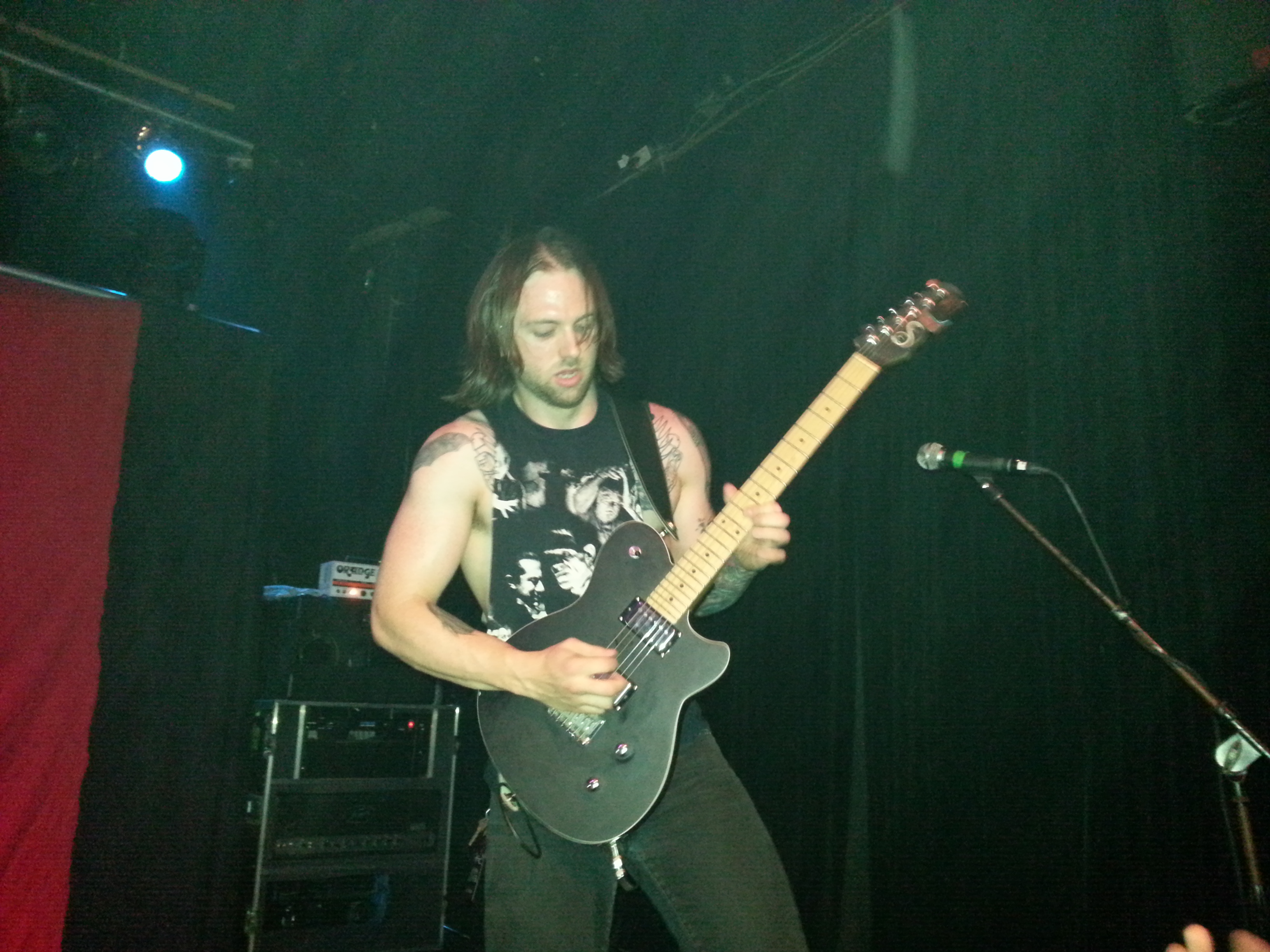
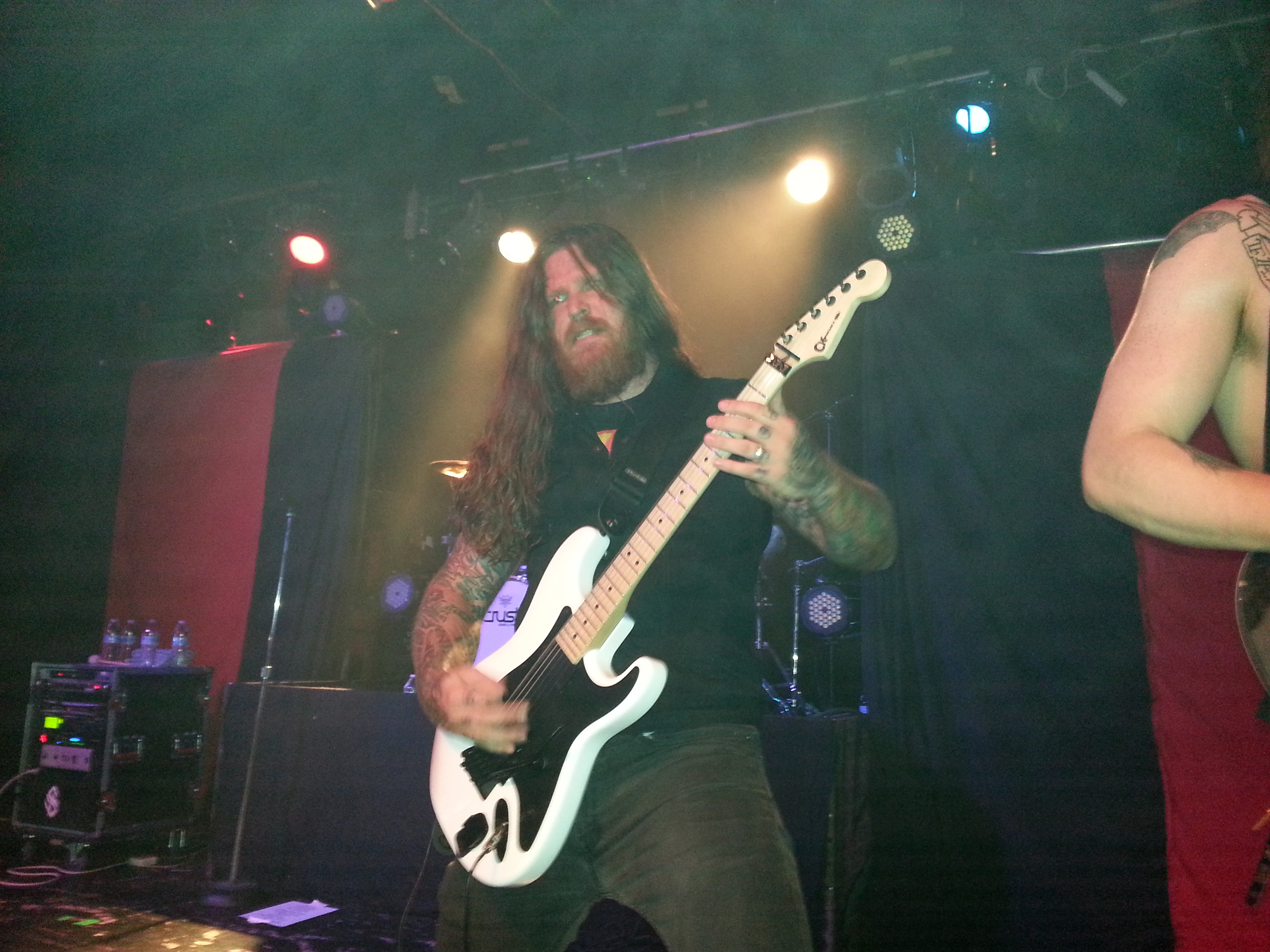
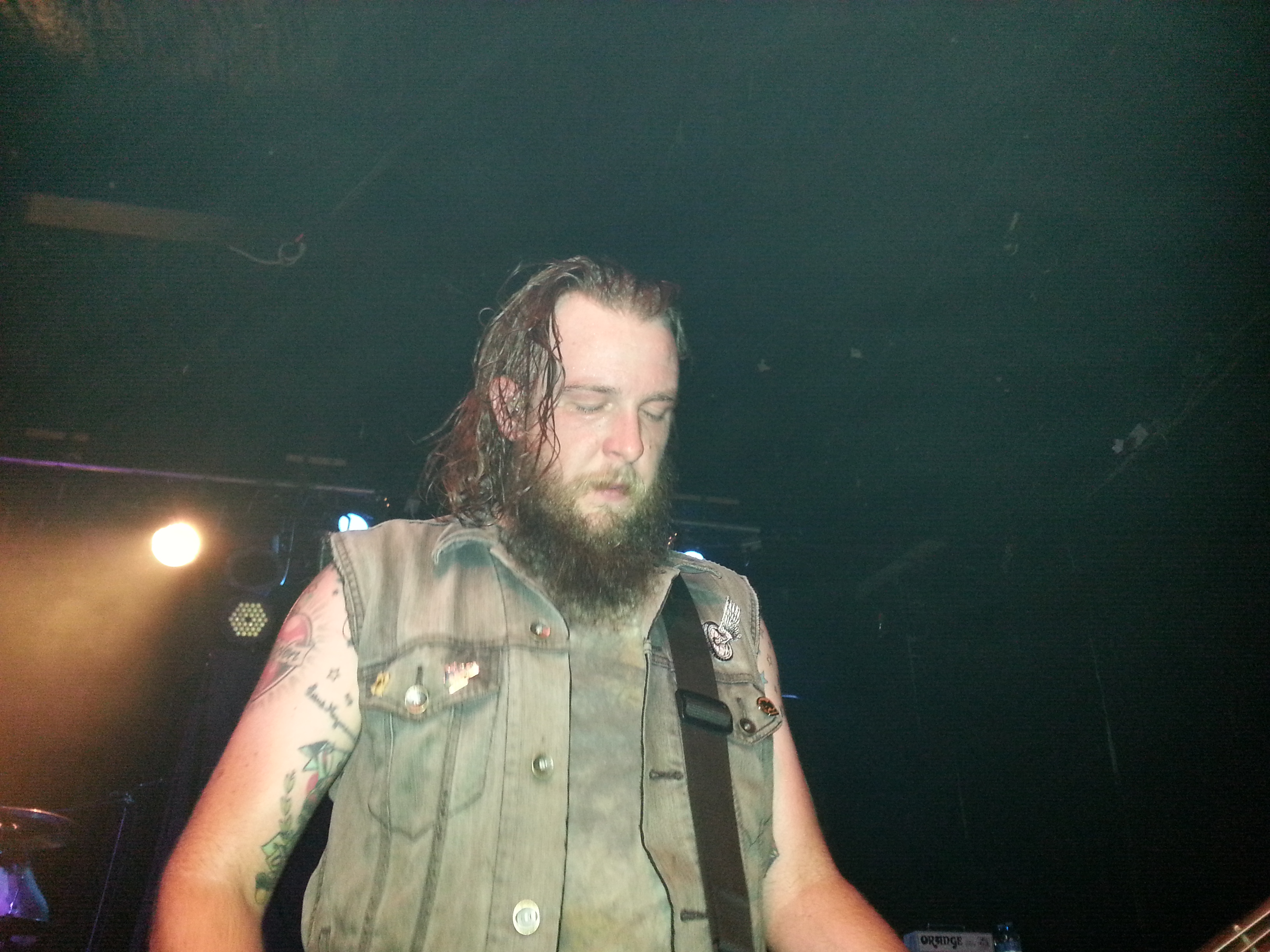
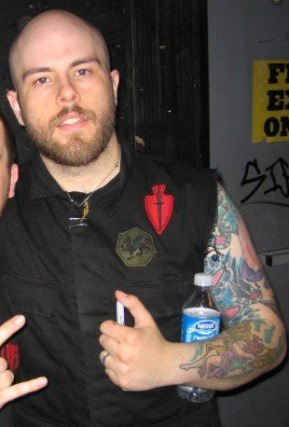
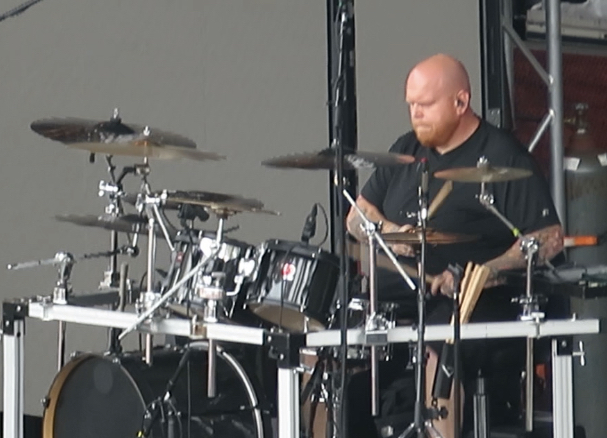
Current lineup, from left to right: Patrick Judge, Jeremiah Scott, Jon Dunn, Ryan Clark, and Timothy "Yogi" Watts

Current members

- Ryan Clark – lead vocals (2000–present); guitars (2000–2002)
- Jon Dunn – bass (2002–present)
- Tim Watts – drums (2004–present)
- Patrick Judge – lead guitar, backing vocals (2009–present)
- Jeremiah Scott – rhythm guitar, backing vocals (2011–present)

Former members

- Jesse Sprinkle – drums (2000–2004)
- Kris McCaddon – lead guitar (2002–2005)
- Don Clark – rhythm guitar (2002–2009); bass (2000–2002)
- Ethan Luck – lead guitar, backing vocals (2005–2009)
- Ryan Helm – rhythm guitar (2009–2011)

Timeline

== Discography ==
- Demon Hunter (2002)
- Summer of Darkness (2004)
- The Triptych (2005)
- Storm the Gates of Hell (2007)
- The World Is a Thorn (2010)
- True Defiance (2012)
- Extremist (2014)
- Outlive (2017)
- War (2019)
- Peace (2019)
- Songs of Death and Resurrection (acoustic re-recording album) (2021)
- Exile (2022)
- There Was a Light Here (2025)

== Awards and nominations ==
Year	Organization	Nominee / work	Category	Result	Ref.
2025	We Love Awards	"Sorrow Light the Way"	Rock / Alternative Song of the Year	Nominated	
2026	Dove Awards	There Was a Light Here	Rock/Contemporary Album of the Year	Nominated	
