= X the album =

Compilation album series

X Series

Compilation album by Various Artists
- Genre: Christian rock
- Label: Tooth & Nail

The X series is a collection of compilation albums and DVDs released by BEC Recordings promoting Christian rock music from bands signed to Capitol Christian Music Group, specifically Tooth & Nail Records, Solid State Records, Gotee Records, ForeFront Records, Sparrow Records, Fervent Records, Flicker Records, Essential Records, Inpop Records and INO Records. The color of 'X' 2012 was red-orange and was released on April 3, 2012.

== Rock Compilations ==
The rock compilations promote general Christian rock and have a little variety into metal, hip-hop, and rap.

=== X 2003 ===
==== Disc 1 ====
Track	Title	Artist	Original album
1	"Get This Party Started" (radio edit) - 2:23	tobyMac	Momentum
2	Fireproof - 3:55	Pillar	Fireproof
3	"Superfly" - 3:08	The O.C. Supertones	Hi-Fi Revival
4	"Punk Rawk Show" - 2:33	MxPx	Teenage Politics
5	"Friday Night" - 2:31	Slick Shoes	Slick Shoes
6	"Bounce" - 3:07	Thousand Foot Krutch	Phenomenon
7	"So Bright (Stand Up)" (radio edit) - 4:05	Superchick	Last One Picked
8	"Speaking in Tongues" - 3:29	The Elms	Truth Soul Rock & Roll
9	"Kamikaze" - 5:51	Five Iron Frenzy	Cheeses...(of Nazareth)
10	"To Live" - 4:05	Justifide	The Beauty of the Unknown
11	"Nobody"	Cadet	The Observatory
12	"Nothing to Lose" - 3:31	Sanctus Real	Say it Loud
13	"I'm Not Backing Down" - 3:21	Holland	Photographs & Tidalwaves
14	"Baseline" - 2:45	Bleach	Again, for the First Time
15	"You Already Take Me There" - 2:43	Switchfoot	Learning to Breathe
16	"Readyfuels" (bonus track) - 3:38	Anberlin	Blueprints for the Black Market
17	"Clear" (bonus track) - 3:38	Watashi Wa	The Love of Life

==== Disc 2 ====
Track	Title	Artist	Original album
1	"Chap Stick, Chapped Lips, and Things Like Chemistry"	Relient K	Two Lefts Don't Make a Right...but Three Do
2	"Summertime"	Audio Adrenaline	Lift
3	"Your Touch"	Kutless	Kutless
4	"John Woo"	Newsboys	Thrive
5	"The Sound"	Further Seems Forever	How to Start a Fire
6	"Engage"	PAX217	Engage
7	"It's Goin' Down"	The Cross Movement	Holy Culture
8	"Take My Life"	Jeremy Camp	Stay
9	"Lift Me Up"	The Benjamin Gate	Contact
10	"The Glorious Ones"	Tree63	The Life and Times of Absolute Truth
11	"Spy"	Tait	Empty
12	"Fire"	Delirious?	Touch
13	"I Am"	Peace of Mind	Peace of Mind
14	"Kill Me, Heal Me" (radio edit)	Skillet	Alien Youth
15	"Infected"	Demon Hunter	Demon Hunter
16	"Monday in Vegas" (bonus track)	Lucerin Blue	Tales of the Knife
17	"Loved Ones" (bonus track)	Starflyer 59	Old

=== X 2004 ===
Track	Title	Artist	Original album
1	"Savior"	Skillet	Collide
2	"Treason"	Kutless	Sea of Faces
3	"Phenomenon" (remix)	tobyMac	Welcome to Diverse City
4	"Rawkfist"	Thousand Foot Krutch	Phenomenon
5	"I Am Understood?"	Relient K	Two Lefts Don't Make a Right...but Three Do
6	"Definitely Maybe"	FM Static	What Are You Waiting For?
7	Bring Me Down	"Pillar"	Where Do We Go from Here
8	"Rock On" (featuring Rob Beckley of Pillar)	KJ-52	It's Pronounced Five Two
9	"Worldwide: Two"	Audio Adrenaline	Worldwide
10	"Running Through My Mind"	Big Dismal	Believe
11	"Freedom to Feel"	John Reuben	Professional Rapper
12	"Landslide"	Seven Places	Lonely for the Last Time
13	"Poor Man"	Plus One	Exodus
14	"Hero" (red pill remix)	Superchick	Regeneration
15	"Numb" (featuring Rob Beckley of Pillar)	Tait	Lose This Life
16	"Stay"	Jeremy Camp	Stay
17	"Crash"	12 Stones	12 Stones
18	"Livin' It"	The Cross Movement	

=== X 2005 ===
Track	Title	Artist	Original album
1	"More Than Useless"	Relient K	MMHMM
2	"Hypnotized"	Pillar	Where Do We Go from Here
3	"Gone"	tobyMac	Welcome to Diverse City
4	"Break Me"	Seventh Day Slumber	Once Upon a Shattered Life
5	"Exit Calypsan" (alternate version)	Falling Up	Dawn Escapes
6	"Everyone Like Me"	Thousand Foot Krutch	Set It Off (remastered)
7	"Lay Down My Pride"	Jeremy Camp	Restored
8	"Everything About You"	Sanctus Real	Fight the Tide
9	"It's Like Me"	Kutless	Sea of Faces
10	"Are You Real?" (featuring Jon Micah Sumrall of Kutless)	KJ-52	Behind the Musik (A Boy Named Jonah)
11	"Reinventing Your Exit"	Underoath	They're Only Chasing Safety
12	"Detainer"	Day of Fire	Day of Fire
13	"Open Wounds"	Skillet	Collide
14	"Out of Control"	John Reuben	The Boy vs. The Cynic
15	"California"	Hawk Nelson	Letters to the President
16	"Bowling Ball"	Superchick	Beauty from Pain
17	"Sooner or Later"	Switchfoot	New Way to Be Human
18	"Even When"	Seven Places	Hear Us Say Jesus
19	"Let This One Stay"	Dizmas	On a Search in America
20	"Apparitions of Melody"	Kids in the Way	Apparitions of Melody
21	"Serial Sleepers"	House of Heroes	House of Heroes

=== X 2006 ===
Track	Title	Artist	Original album
1	"Shut Me Out"	Kutless	Hearts of the Innocent
2	"The Slam"	tobyMac (featuring T-Bone)	Welcome to Diverse City
3	"Move"	Thousand Foot Krutch	The Art of Breaking
4	"I So Hate Consequences"	Relient K	MMHMM
5	"Searching for a Savior"	Building 429	Rise
6	"Breathe"	Jeremy Camp	Restored
7	"I'm Not Alright"	Sanctus Real	The Face of Love
8	"5 Minutes of Fame"	BarlowGirl	Another Journal Entry
9	"The One Thing I Have Left"	Hawk Nelson	Smile, It's the End of the World
10	"Moonlit"	Falling Up	Dawn Escapes
11	"Falling to Pieces"	Third Day	Wherever You Are
12	"Wake Me"	Day of Fire	Cut & Move
13	"One Thousand Apologies"	Demon Hunter	The Triptych
14	"It's Dangerous Business Walking Out Your Front Door"	Underoath	They're Only Chasing Safety
15	"Run for Cover" (featuring Trevor McNevan of Thousand Foot Krutch)	KJ-52	KJ-52 Remixed
16	"Suddenly"	Superchick	Beauty From Pain
17	"The Wait is Over"	Disciple	Disciple
18	"Back to You" (bonus track)	Fighting Instinct	Fighting Instinct
19	"Take Away" (bonus track)	Mainstay	Well Meaning Fiction
20	"Already Over" (bonus track)	Red	End of Silence

=== X 2007 ===
Track	Title	Artist	Original album
1	"Flights"	Falling Up	Dawn Escapes
2	"Go"	Newsboys	Go
3	"Is Forever Enough?"	Hawk Nelson	Smile, It's the End of the World
4	"Awake"	Seventh Day Slumber	Finally Awake
5	"Tonight"	Jeremy Camp	Beyond Measure
6	"Fly"	Sanctus Real	The Face of Love
7	"Somewhere in the Sky"	Kutless	Hearts of the Innocent
8	"Rebirthing"	Skillet	Comatose
9	"Writing on the Walls"	Underoath	Define the Great Line
10	"Absolute"	Thousand Foot Krutch	The Art of Breaking
11	"Blaze of Glory"	Audio Adrenaline	Adios: The Greatest Hits
12	"The Next Big Thing"	FM Static	Critically Ashamed
13	"Do Not Move"	David Crowder*Band	A Collision
14	"Undying"	Demon Hunter	The Triptych
15	"Studying Politics"	Emery	The Question
16	"Who I Am Hates Who I've Been"	Relient K	MMHMM
17	"Role Remodeling"	MxPx	Let It Happen (Deluxe Edition)
18	"Become What You Believe" (bonus track)	Last Tuesday	Become What You Believe
19	"Open Wide" (bonus track)	Future of Forestry	Twilight
20	"Invisible Hook" (bonus track)	House of Heroes	Say No More
21	"We've Only Just Begun" (bonus track)	Run Kid Run	This Is Who We Are

=== X 2008 ===
Track	Title	Artist	Original album
1	"Falls Apart"	Thousand Foot Krutch	The Flame in All of Us
2	"Boomin'"	tobyMac	Portable Sounds
3	"Hotel Aquarium"	Falling Up	Captiva
4	"Song for the Broken"	BarlowGirl	How Can We Be Silent
5	"Forgiven"	Relient K	Five Score and Seven Years Ago
6	"Say This Sooner"	The Almost	Southern Weather
7	"Fully Alive"	Flyleaf	Flyleaf
8	"I Love You to Death"	Family Force 5	Business Up Front/Party in the Back (Diamond Edition)
9	"Hearts of the Innocent"	Kutless	Hearts of the Innocent
10	"The Show"	Hawk Nelson	Smile, It's the End of the World
11	"Oh! Gravity"	Switchfoot	Oh! Gravity
12	"Reaching"	Leeland	Sound of Melodies
13	"Whispers in the Dark"	Skillet	Comatose
14	"You're Ever So Inviting"	Underoath	Define the Great Line
15	"Breathe Into Me"	Red	End of Silence
16	"A Whisper and a Clamor"	Anberlin	Cities
17	"You're on Fire"	MxPx	Secret Weapon

Notes

X 2008 also came with a secret link that you could use to download a "New Music Sampler".

==== X 2008: New Rock Sampler ====
Track	Title	Artist	Original album
1	"Wake Up" (featuring Toby Morell of Emery)	KJ-52	The Yearbook
2	"Superstar"	Stephanie Smith	Not Afraid
3	"Tomorrow"	Our Heart's Hero	Our Heart's Hero
4	"Madmen"	Wavorly	Conquering the Fear of Flight
5	"Live Like We're Alive"	Nevertheless	Live Like We're Alive
6	"You Are"	Ruth	Secondhand Dreaming
7	"Going Under"	This Beautiful Republic	Even Heroes Need a Parachute
8	"14th and Knott"	A Dream Too Late	Intermission to the Moon
9	"An Epiphany"	The Send	Cosmos
10	"Evil (A Chorus of Resistance)"	Project 86	Rival Factions
11	"History Erased"	Spoken	Spoken
12	"Working Man"	Newworldson	Salvation Station
13	"Play It Safe"	Dizmas	Dizmas
14	"Become Who You Are"	Mainstay	Become Who You Are
15	"The Party Song"	Emery	I'm Only a Man

==== X Christmas ====
X Christmas features some of BEC Recordings top bands showing their stuff for Christmas.

Track	Title	Artist
1	"Jingle Bell Rock"	Thousand Foot Krutch
2	"Gloria"	Hawk Nelson
3	"Little Drummer Boy"	The Almost
4	"Evergreen"	Switchfoot
5	"Feliz Navidad"	David Crowder Band
6	"Christmas, Baby Please Come Home"	Anberlin
7	"Mary Did You Know"	Kutless
8	"Christmas Shoes"	FM Static
9	"Love Came Down at Christmas"	Jars of Clay
10	"This Time of the Year"	Project 86
11	"Do You Hear What I Hear"	Seventh Day Slumber
12	"Silent Night"	Sanctus Real
13	"Carol of the Bells"	August Burns Red
14	"It's Christmas Time"	KJ-52
15	"His Favorite Christmas Story"	Capital Lights
16	"Rockin' Around the Christmas Tree"	Jaymes Reunion
17	"Angels We Have Heard On High"	Corey Crowder

=== X 2009 ===
Track	Title	Artist	Original album
1	"Ignition"	tobyMac	Portable Sounds
2	"To Know That You're Alive"	Kutless	To Know That You're Alive
3	"Friend Like That"	Hawk Nelson	Hawk Nelson Is My Friend
4	"The Flame in All of Us"	Thousand Foot Krutch	The Flame in All of Us
5	"Awakening"	Switchfoot	Oh! Gravity
6	"We Need Each Other"	Sanctus Real	We Need Each Other
7	"Radiator"	Family Force 5	Dance or Die
8	"Southern Weather"	The Almost	Southern Weather
9	"Outrage"	Capital Lights	This Is an Outrage!
10	"The Smile, The Face"	Emery	...In Shallow Seas We Sail
11	"Hello Alone"	Anberlin	Cities
12	"Desperate Times, Desperate Measures"	Underoath	Lost in the Sound of Separation
13	"Live Free or Let Me Die"	Skillet	Comatose (Deluxe Edition)
14	"Surrender"	Seventh Day Slumber	Take Everything
15	"The Unavoidable Battle of Feeling on the Outside"	FM Static	Dear Diary
16	"Rock What You Got"	Superchick	Rock What You Got
17	"Sure Shot"	Run Kid Run	Love at the Core
18	"The Difference" (bonus track)	Philmont	Attention
19	"Disaster" (bonus track)	Since October	This Is My Heart

Notes

This is the first time that Capital Lights, Philmont, and Since October have been on an X album, although Capital Lights performed "His Favorite Christmas Story" on X Christmas.

=== X 2010 ===
Album release
No.	Title	Writer(s)	Artist (Album)	Length
1.	"Fire It Up"	Steve Augustine, Joel Bruyere, Trevor McNevan	Thousand Foot Krutch (Welcome to the Masquerade)	3:06
2.	"Dead Inside"	John Cooper	Skillet (Awake (Deluxe Edition))	2:55
3.	"Again"	Sameer Bhattacharya, James Culpepper, Jared Hartmann, Lancy Nicole Mosley, Kirk Patrick Seals	Flyleaf (Memento Mori)	3:01
4.	"Hands"	Aaron Gillespie, Dusty Redmon, Alex Aponti, Jay Vilardi	The Almost (Monster Monster)	3:58
5.	"Fight Inside"	Rob Graves, Bernie Herms, Jason McArthur, Jasen Rauch	Red (Innocence & Instinct)	4:08
6.	"Collapsing" (Radio Edit)	Demon Hunter	Demon Hunter (The World Is a Thorn)	3:39
7.	"Desperate"	Justin Cox, Glenn Drennen, Wendy Drennen, Rob Hawkins, Dawn Richardson, Phee Shorb	Fireflight (For Those Who Wait)	2:53
8.	"You Save Me"	Pete Kipley, Nick De Partee, Phil Wickham	Kutless (It Is Well)	3:06
9.	"Live Life Loud"	Daniel Biro, Jason Dunn, Trevor McNevan	Hawk Nelson (Live Life Loud)	2:57
10.	"Take Me as I Am"	FM Static	FM Static (Dear Diary)	3:32
11.	"Hanging on By a Thread"	Sarah Anthony, Rob Hawkins	The Letter Black (Hanging On By a Thread)	3:03
12.	"Meddler"	August Burns Red	August Burns Red (Constellations)	3:53
13.	"Let's Go" (featuring Trevor McNevan of Thousand Foot Krutch)	Jonah Sorrentino, Trevor McNevan, Aaron Sprinkle	KJ-52 (Five-Two Television)	2:51
14.	"From the Inside Out" (Hillsong United cover)	Joel Houston	Seventh Day Slumber (Take Everything)	3:58
15.	"Whatever It Takes"	Rob Beckley, Rob Graves, Jasen Rauch	Pillar (Confessions)	3:53
Total length:				50:53

=== X 2011 ===
Album release
No.	Title	Writer(s)	Artist (Album)	Length
1.	"Crazy Love"	Daniel Bird, Jason Dunn, Ian Eskelin, Tony Wood	Hawk Nelson (Crazy Love)	3:41
2.	"My Brain Says Stop, But My Heart Says Go"	FM Static	FM Static (My Brain Says Stop, But My Heart Says Go!)	3:01
3.	"Take Over Me"	Dan Gartley, Mark Graalman, Matt Hammitt, Pete Prevost, Chris Rohman, Christopher Stevens	Sanctus Real (Pieces of a Real Heart)	3:03
4.	"We Were Made For You"	Aaron Gillespie	Aaron Gillespie (Anthem Song)	3:29
5.	"Fix Me"	Emery	Emery (We Do What We Want)	3:49
6.	"Believe"	Mark Anthony, Travis Wyrick	The Letter Black (Hanging On by a Thread)	4:01
7.	"Driving Nails"	Demon Hunter	Demon Hunter (The World Is a Thorn)	4:08
8.	"The Sound (John M. Perkins' Blues)"	Jon Foreman, Tim Foreman	Switchfoot (Hello Hurricane)	3:46
9.	"Avalanche"	Chris Greenwood, Adam Messinger	Manafest (The Chase)	3:08
10.	"New Fire"	Dane Anderson, Andy O'Neal, Jamie Windham, Zachary Riner, James Michael Leonard Jr.	Sent by Ravens (Our Graceful Words)	3:37
11.	"Hero"	Abandon, Christopher Stevens, Justin York	Abandon (Searchlights)	3:41
12.	"Forward Motion"	Steve Augustine, Joel Bruyere, Trevor McNevan	Thousand Foot Krutch (Welcome to the Masquerade)	3:53
13.	"God Save the Foolish Kings"	A.J. Babcock, Jared Bigsby, Colin Rigsby, Tim Skipper	House of Heroes (Suburba)	3:51
14.	"No I Don't"	Aaron Gillespie, Dusty Redmon, Alex Aponti, Jay Vilardi.	The Almost (Monster Monster)	3:53
15.	"Remember Me"	Jon Howard, Nick De Partee	Kutless (It Is Well)	3:54
16.	"In Division"	Underøath	Underøath (Ø (Disambiguation))	3:58
Total length:				58:53

=== X 2012 ===
Album release
No.	Title	Writer(s)	Artist (Album)	Length
1.	"Dark Horses"	Jon Foreman, Tim Foreman	Switchfoot (Vice Verses)	3:56
2.	"Tonight" (featuring John Cooper of Skillet)	Toby McKeehan, Cary Barlowe, Christopher Stevens	tobyMac (Tonight)	4:23
3.	"Need"	Nick DePartee, Dave Lubben	Kutless (Believer)	3:35
4.	"Awake and Alive"	John Cooper, Brian Howes	Skillet (Awake)	3:31
5.	"Children of the Light" (featuring Sonny Sandoval & Dillavou)	Lecrae Moore, Sonny Sandoval, Justin Dillavou, Benjamin LeRoy Thom	Lecrae (Rehab)	3:32
6.	"Not Alone" (Radio Version)	Derek Mount, Jacob Olds, Jamie Houston, Josh Olds, Nathan Currin, Solomon Olds	Family Force 5 (III)	3:53
7.	"Your Love Is a Mystery"	Jason Dunn, Daniel Biro	Hawk Nelson (Crazy Love)	3:12
8.	"Fighter"	Chris Greenwood, Seth Mosley	Manafest (Fighter)	2:57
9.	"Shook"	Steve Augustine, Joel Bruyere, Trevor McNevan	Thousand Foot Krutch (Welcome to the Masquerade)	3:27
10.	"Ignite"	Josh Baker, Justin Cox, Down Michele, Glenn Drennen, Wendy Drennen, Mark Holma, Joe Rickard	Fireflight (Now)	2:57
11.	"Dead Flowers"	Demon Hunter	Demon Hunter (True Defiance)	5:25
12.	"It Was a Dark and Stormy Night"	Five Iron Frenzy	Five Iron Frenzy (It Was a Dark and Stormy Night (single))	3:30
13.	"Make a Move"	Ariel, Shawn Jump, Adam Kronshagen, Steve Wilson	Icon for Hire (Scripted)	3:05
14.	"Faceless"	Anthony Armstrong, Rob Graves, Mark Holman, Jasen Rauch	Red (Until We Have Faces)	3:25
15.	"Anthem of the Lonely"	Jeremy Dunn, Jerry Jefferson, Jonathan Jefferson, Jared Lankford, Trevor McNevan, Thomas Terrell	Nine Lashes (World We View)	4:03
16.	"Feel It In Your Heart"	Justin Engerl, Josh Engler, Bryan Fowler, Christopher Stevens, Dave Vela, Steven Vela	Abandon (Control)	3:12
17.	"Last Train Home"	Steve Augustine, Trevor McNevan, Aaron Sprinkle	FM Static (My Brains Says Stop, But My Heart Says Go)	3:34
18.	"Make Me New"	Allen Salmon, Rhett Walker	Rhett Walker Band (Come to the River)	3:07
19.	"Full Court Mess" (featuring KB)	Kevin Burgess, Marvin Glaspie, Derek Johnson, Joseph Prielozny	PRo (Dying to Live)	3:38
20.	"We're All Liars"	Dane Anderson, Jon Arena, JJ Leonard, Andy O'Neal, Zachary Riner	Sent By Ravens (Mean What You Say)	3:04
Total length:				71:26

== DVDs ==
The X Series DVDs are a compilation of Christian music videos promoting the same artists as the rock compilations. They began the same year as the rock compilations, in 2003.

=== X 2003 ===
Track	Title	Artist	Original album
1	"Get This Party Started"	tobyMac	Momentum
2	"Your Touch"	Kutless	Kutless
3	"Chap Stick, Chapped Lips, and Things Like Chemistry"	Relient K	Two Lefts Don't Make a Right...but Three Do
4	"Lift Me Up"	The Benjamin Gate	
5	"Dear Slim"	KJ-52	Collaborations
6	"We Are Tomorrow"	Bleach	Again, for the First Time
7	"Alone"	Slick Shoes	Slick Shoes
8	"Speaking In Tongues"	The Elms	
9	"Say It Loud"	Sanctus Real	Say It Loud
10	"You Already Take Me There"	Switchfoot	Learning to Breathe
11	"Understand"	Jeremy Camp	Stay
12	"My Mistake"	MxPx	
13	"Kill Me, Heal Me"	Skillet	Alien Youth
14	"Superfly"	The O.C. Supertones	Hi-Fi Revival

=== X 2004 ===
Track	Title	Artist	Original album
1	"Rawkfist"	Thousand Foot Krutch	Phenomenon
2	"Savior"	Skillet"	Collide
3	"Crash"	12 Stones	12 Stones
4	"Sea of Faces"	Kutless	Sea of Faces
5	"Church Punks"	Audio Adrenaline	Worldwide
6	"Landslide"	Seven Places	Lonely for the Last Time
7	"Lose This Life"	Tait	
8	"Definitely Maybe"	FM Static	
9	"Further from Myself" (live acoustic)	Pillar	Broken Down: The EP
10	"Livin It"	The Cross Movement	
11	"Run"	Kutless	Kutless
12	"Walls"	Emery	
13	"Readyfuels"	Anberlin	Blueprints for the Black Market
14	"Broken Heart"	Falling Up	
15	"We Are"	Kids in the Way	

=== X 2005 ===
Track	Title	Artist	Original album
1	"Gone"	tobyMac	Welcome to Diverse City
2	"Take You Back"	Jeremy Camp	Restored
3	"Everything About You"	Sanctus Real	Fight the Tide
4	"Bring Me Down"	Pillar	Where Do We Go from Here
5	"Not What You See"	Kutless	Sea of Faces
6	"Caroline"	Seventh Day Slumber	Restored
7	"Reinventing Your Exit"	Underoath	They're Only Chasing Safety
8	"Escalates"	Falling Up	
9	"California"	Hawk Nelson	Letters to the President
10	"Nuisance"	John Reuben featuring Matt Thiessen	The Boy vs. The Cynic
11	"KJ Five Two"	KJ-52	It's Pronounced Five Two
12	"Not Ready to Die"	Demon Hunter	Summer of Darkness
13	"Stereo"	4th Avenue Jones	
14	"The Spy Hunter"	Project 86	Songs to Burn Your Bridges By
15	"Serial Sleepers"	House of Heroes	House of Heroes
16	"Mouth Like a Magazine"	Showbread	No Sir, Nihilism Is Not Practical

=== X 2006 ===
Track	Title	Artist	Original album
1	"Shut Me Out"	Kutless	Hearts of the Innocent
2	"Moonlit"	Falling Up	Dawn Escapes
3	"The Wait is Over"	Disciple	Disciple
4	"Move"	Thousand Foot Krutch	The Art of Breaking
5	"Frontline"	Pillar	Where Do We Go from Here
6	"It's Dangerous Business Walking Out Your Front Door"	Underoath	They're Only Chasing Safety
7	"Let This One Stay"	Dizmas	On a Search in America
8	"Undying"	Demon Hunter	The Triptych
9	"Bitter Taste"	Spoken	Last Chance to Breathe
10	"Life After Death"	KJ-52	Behind the Musik (A Boy Named Jonah)
11	"The Fight" (bonus video)	The Classic Crime	Albatross
12	"Rodeo" (bonus video)	Manafest	Epiphany
13	"The Night You Guardian Fell Asleep" (bonus video)	Chasing Victory	I Call This Abandonment
14	"Have You Seen Me?" (bonus video)	Last Tuesday	Resolve
15	"When Everything Falls" (bonus video)	Haste the Day	When Everything Falls

=== X 2007 ===
Track	Title	Artist	Original album
1	"The One Thing I Have Left"	Hawk Nelson	Smile, It's the End of the World
2	"I'm Not Alright"	Sanctus Real	The Face of Love
3	"Writing on the Walls"	Underoath	Define the Great Line
4	"Somewhere in the Sky"	Kutless	Hearts of the Innocent
5	"We've Only Just Begun"	Run Kid Run	This Is Who We Are
6	"Paperthin Hymn"	Anberlin	Never Take Friendship Personal
7	"Who I Am Hates Who I've Been"	Relient K	mmhmm
8	"Love Addict"	Family Force 5	Business Up Front/Party in the Back
9	"Studying Politics"	Emery	The Question
10	"This House"	Edison Glass	A Burn or a Shiver
11	"This Could Be"	Mainstay	Well Meaning Fiction
12	"Unrequited Love"	Chasing Victory	I Call This Abandonment
13	"Rodeo"	Manafest	Epiphany

=== X 2008 ===
Track	Title	Artist	Original album
1	"All Around Me"	Flyleaf	Flyleaf
2	"Secret Weapon"	MxPx	Secret Weapon
3	"Must Have Done Something Right"	Relient K	Five Score and Seven Years Ago
4	"Boomin"	tobyMac	Portable Sounds
5	"Oh! Gravity"	Switchfoot	Oh! Gravity
6	"Breathe Into Me"	Red	End of Silence
7	"Fanmail"	KJ-52	The Yearbook
8	"You're Ever So Inviting"	Underoath	Define the Great Line
9	"Zero"	Hawk Nelson	Smile, It's the End of the World
10	"Sound of Melodies"	Leeland	Sound of Melodies

X 2008: The Videos includes eight bonus videos by the following artists: nevertheless, Chasing Victory The Send, Future of Forestry, Ruth, Manafest, Project 86, and Seventh Day Slumber.

=== X 2009 ===
X 2009 is sold with a bonus DVD of Christian Rock music videos from various artists, which is the first X album to do so. This is the video listing for the DVD.

1. tobymac, Lose My Soul
2. Family Force 5, Radiator
3. Hawk Nelson, Friend Like That
4. Skillet, Comatose (Live)
5. Jeremy Camp, Speaking Louder than Before
6. Underoath, Desperate Times Desperate Measures
7. Thousand Foot Krutch, Favorite Disease
8. The Almost, Southern Weather
9. Sanctus Real, Whatever You're Doing
10. Demon Hunter, Carry Me Down
11. Seabird, The Rescue
12. Article One, Without You I'm Not Alright
13. Run Kid Run, One in a Million
14. Philmont, The Difference
15. Since October, Disaster
16. Capital Lights, Outrage
17. Children 18:3, All My Balloons
18. Ruth, Back to the Five

== X Worship ==
The X Worship compilations, which began in 2006 and ended in 2007, promoted lighter Christian rock, rather than the general rock theme.

=== X Worship 2006 ===
Track	Title	Artist	Original album
1	"My Glorious"	Delirious?	Glo
2	"Some Will Seek Forgiveness, Others Escape"	Underoath	They're Only Chasing Safety
3	"Spirit"	Switchfoot	
4	"Breathe You In"	Thousand Foot Krutch	The Art of Breaking
5	"I Am Understood?"	Relient K	Two Lefts Don't Make a Right...but Three Do
6	"Everything About You"	Sanctus Real	Fight the Tide
7	"Release the Deep"	Telecast	
8	"Finding Who We Are"	Kutless	Strong Tower
9	"I Wait for the Lord"	Jeremy Camp	Carried Me
10	"Do Not Move"	David Crowder Band	A Collision
11	"Redemption Passion Glory"	Dizmas	On a Search in America
12	"Matthias Replaces Judas"	Showbread	No Sir, Nihilism Is Not Practical
13	"In the Burning"	Something Like Silas	
14	"When All We Have Is Taken"	Edison Glass	A Burn or a Shiver
15	"Laid to Rest"	The Showdown	A Chorus of Obliteration

=== X Worship 2007 ===
Track	Title	Artist	Original album
1	"Those Words Aren't Enough"	Relient K	The Anatomy of the Tongue in Cheek
2	"Everything That You Ever Wanted"	Hawk Nelson	Smile, It's the End of the World
3	"Eloquent"	Sanctus Real	The Face of Love
4	"Now is the Time"	Delirious?	The Mission Bell
5	"All I Want"	Future of Forestry	Twilight
6	"One Thousand Apologies"	Demon Hunter	The Triptych
7	"Contact"	Falling Up	Dawn Escapes
8	"Obsession"	Starfield	Beauty in the Broken
9	"Our Happy Home"	David Crowder Band	A Collision
10	"Promise of a Lifetime"	Kutless	Hearts of the Innocent
11	"Oceans from the Rain"	Seventh Day Slumber	Once Upon a Shattered Life
12	"Cloud Cover"	This Beautiful Republic	Even Heroes Need a Parachute
13	"I Believe You"	The Fold	This Too Shall Pass
14	"Obsession"	Edison Glass	A Burn or a Shiver
15	"The First Steps to Recovery"	Chasing Victory	I Call This Abandonment
16	"To Whom It May Concern:"	Underoath	Define the Great Line
