= Kutless discography =

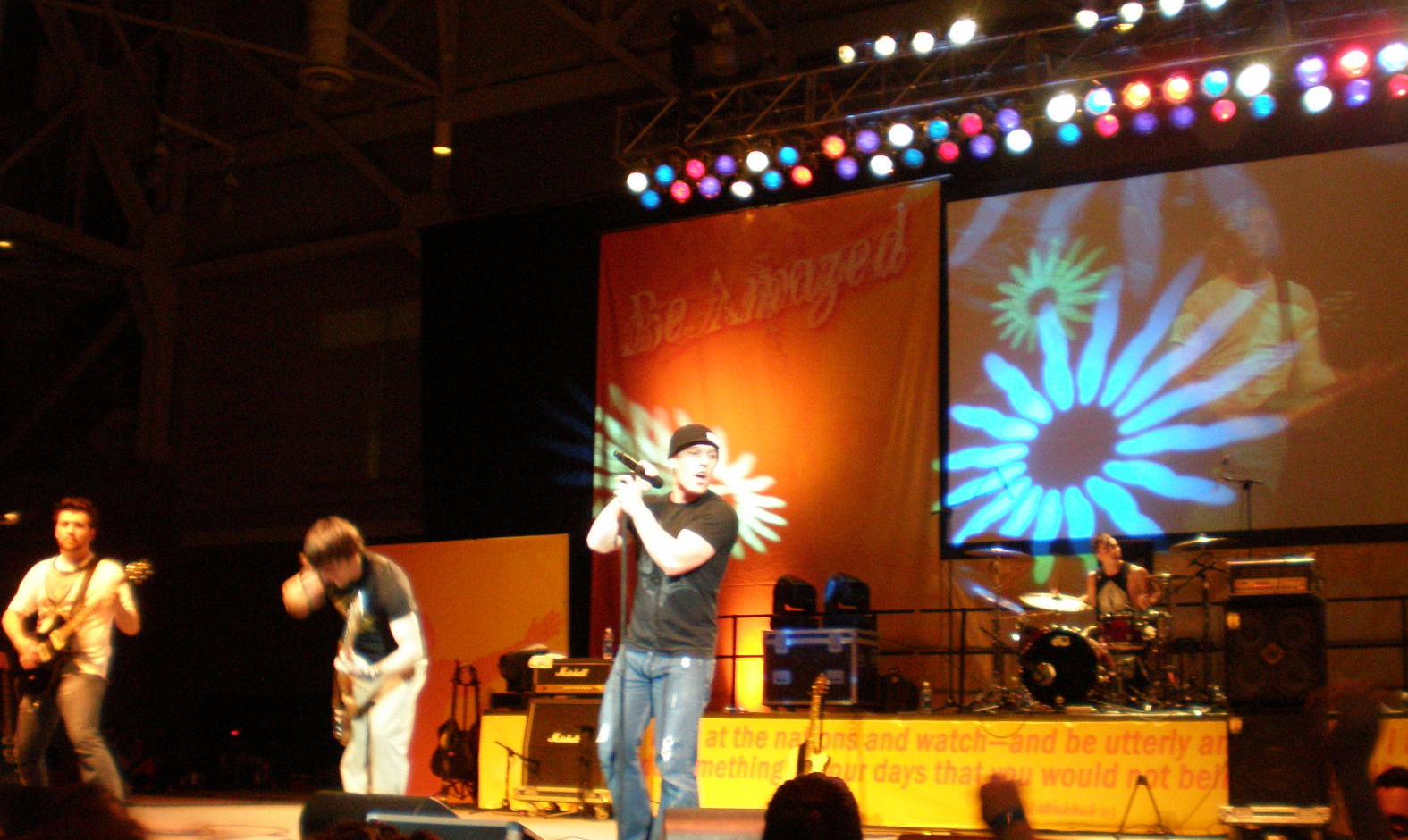
- Studio albums: 10
- Extended plays: 2
- Live albums: 1
- Compilation albums: 2
- Singles: 50
- Music videos: 13

The discography of the American Christian rock band Kutless consists of 10 studio albums and 50 singles.

== Albums ==
=== Studio albums ===
Year	Title	Peak chart position			Certifications
Year	Title	US	US Christ.	US Rock	Certifications
2002	Kutless: Released: July 16, 2002; Label: BEC Recordings	—	27	—	
2004	Sea of Faces: Released: February 24, 2004; Label: BEC Recordings	97	3	—	
2005	Strong Tower: Released: March 1, 2005; Label: BEC Recordings	87	4	—	US: Gold
2006	Hearts of the Innocent: Released: March 21, 2006; Label: BEC Recordings	45	2	—	
2008	To Know That You're Alive: Released: June 24, 2008; Label: BEC Recordings	46	1	25	
2009	It Is Well: Released: October 20, 2009; Label: BEC Recordings	42	2	15	
2012	Believer: Released: February 28, 2012; Label: BEC Recordings	36	1	7	
2014	Glory: Released: February 11, 2014; Label: BEC Recordings	105	5	24	
2015	Surrender: Released: November 13, 2015; Label: BEC Recordings	—	13	25	
2017	Alpha / Omega: Released: November 10, 2017; Label: BEC Recordings	—	38	—	
"—" denotes a title that did not chart, or was not released in that territory.

== Extended plays ==
- Twenty (2022)
- The Seventh Seal (2025)

== Miscellaneous releases ==
Year	Title	Peak chart position			Type of release
Year	Title	US Christ.	US Alt.	US Hol.	Type of release
2002	Kutless DVD: Released: 2002; Label: BEC Recordings; Format: DVD	—	—	—	DVD
2006	Hearts of the Innocent: Special Edition: Released: November 23, 2006; Label: BEC Recordings; Format: CD/DVD	—	—	—	CD/DVD
2006	Live from Portland: Released: December 5, 2006; Label: BEC Recordings; Format: CD/DVD	30	—	—	Live Album (CD/DVD)
2010	The Beginning: A Kutless Anthology: Released: July 13, 2010; Label: BEC Recordings; Format: CD	—	—	—	Compilation (CD)
2011	This Is Christmas: Released: October 4, 2011; Label: BEC Recordings; Format: CD	15	25	7	Christmas EP (CD)
2013	The Worship Collection: Released: February 26, 2013; Label: BEC Recordings; Format: CD	18	—	—	Compilation (CD)
"—" denotes a title that did not chart, or was not released in that territory.

== Music videos ==
- All videos copyright BEC Recordings 2002–2013

Year	Title	Album	Source
2002	"Your Touch"	Kutless	Kutless.com/media
2002	"Tonight"	Kutless	Kutless.com/media
2003	"Run"	Kutless	Kutless.com/media
2004	"Not What You See"	Sea of Faces	Kutless.com/media
2004	"Sea of Faces"	Sea of Faces	YouTube: Link
2005	"Strong Tower"	Strong Tower	YouTube: Link
2005	"Shut Me Out"	Hearts of the Innocent	Kutless.com/media
2006	"Somewhere in the Sky"	Hearts of the Innocent	YouTube: Link
2009	"To Know That You're Alive"	To Know That You're Alive	YouTube: Link
2009	"What Faith Can Do"	It Is Well	YouTube: Link
2011	"Everything I Need"	It Is Well	GodTube: Link
2013	"Even If"	Believer	
2023	"High Enough"		
2026	"Peace Be Still"		

== Non-album tracks ==
- "More Than It Seems" – Music Inspired by The Chronicles of Narnia: The Lion, the Witch and the Wardrobe (2005)

== Singles ==
Year	Title	Peak chart positions			Certifications	Album
Year	Title	US Bub	US Christ	US Heat.	Certifications	Album
2002	"Your Touch"	—	—	—		Kutless
2002	"Run"	—	—	—		Kutless
2003	"Tonight"	—	—	—		Kutless
2003	"Pride Away"	—	—	—		Kutless
2004	"Treason"	—	—	—		Sea of Faces
2004	"Sea of Faces"	—	8	—		Sea of Faces
2004	"Not What You See"	—	—	—		Sea of Faces
2004	"It's Like Me"	—	21	—		Sea of Faces
2005	"Strong Tower"	—	4	—		Strong Tower
2005	"Draw Me Close"	—	12	—		Strong Tower
2005	"Ready For You"	—	19	—		Strong Tower
2005	"Better is One Day"	—	—	—		Strong Tower
2005	"We Fall Down"	—	26	—		Strong Tower
2006	"Shut Me Out"	—	—	—		Hearts of the Innocent
2006	"Winds of Change"	—	—	—		Hearts of the Innocent
2007	"Somewhere in the Sky"	—	—	—		Hearts of the Innocent
2007	"Promise of a Lifetime"	—	21	—		Hearts of the Innocent
2008	"The Feeling"	—	—	—		To Know That You're Alive
2008	"Complete"	—	18	—		To Know That You're Alive
2009	"To Know That You're Alive"	—	41	—		To Know That You're Alive
2009	"I Do Not Belong"	—	38	—		To Know That You're Alive
2009	"What Faith Can Do"	19	1	14		It Is Well
2010	"Everything I Need"	—	10	—		It Is Well
2011	"Amazed"	—	22	—		It Is Well
2011	"Taken By Love"	—	44	—		It Is Well
2012	"Carry Me to the Cross"	—	8	—		Believer
2012	"Even If"	—	18	—		Believer
2012	"Believer"	—	32	—		Believer
2012	"Beautiful"	—	33	—		This Is Christmas
2013	"If It Ends Today"	—	35	—		Believer
2013	"I'm With You"	—	23	—		Believer
2013	"You Alone"	—	29	—		Glory
2014	"Always"	—	28	—		Glory
2014	"Never Too Late"	—	46	—		Glory
2014	"Revelation"	—	11	—		Glory
2014	"In Jesus' Name"	—	21	—		Glory
2015	"Bring It On"	—	12	—		Surrender
2015	"Mirror"	—	8	—		Surrender
2015	"Overcome"	—	21	—		Surrender
2016	"Not Too Far"	—	—	—		Surrender
2016	"Love Come Crashing Down"	—	13	—		Surrender
2016	"My Heart Is a Ghost"	—	22	—		Surrender
2017	"King of My Heart"	—	17	—		Alpha / Omega
2018	"Strong Tower (Reprise)"	—	20	—		Alpha / Omega
2018	"No Wonder (Roar of the Rugged Cross)"	—	19	—		Alpha / Omega
2022	"Words of Fire"	—	—	—		The Seventh Seal
2022	"End of the World" (feat. Kevin Young of Disciple)	—	—	—		The Seventh Seal
2023	"High Enough" (with Good Weather Forecast)	—	—	—		Non-album single
2025	"Midnight"	—	—	—		The Seventh Seal
2025	"Lies of My Brother"	—	—	—		The Seventh Seal
"—" denotes a title that did not chart, or was not released in that territory.

== Other charted songs ==
Year	Title	Peak chart positions	Album
Year	Title	US Christ Rock	Album
2025	"Hold On" (featuring Dawn Michelle)	5	The Seventh Seal
