= Live from Portland =

Live album by Kutless
- Released: December 5, 2006
- Recorded: March 16, 2006
- Venue: Portland, Oregon
- Genre: Christian rock, post-grunge, contemporary worship music
- Length: 63:00
- Label: BEC
- Producer: Zach Hodges: J.R. McNeely

Kutless chronology
Hearts of the Innocent (2006)	Live from Portland (2006)	To Know That You're Alive (2008)

Professional ratings
Review scores
Source	Rating
Jesus Freak Hideout	4/5 stars

Live from Portland is the first live album by the Christian rock band Kutless. It was released on December 5, 2006. It was recorded on March 16, 2006, in the band's hometown of Portland, Oregon. The album comes with a CD of the concert's audio, and a DVD with the concert itself. The DVD is slightly longer than the CD, including drum solos from drummer Jeffrey Gilbert. The DVD also contains the band's music video for "Shut Me Out", and a documentary about the show and the band being on tour. This is the band's last release with longtime guitarist Ryan Shrout, though his last studio album with them was Hearts of the Innocent.

== Track listing ==
Album release
No.	Title	Writer(s)	Original studio recording on	Length
1.	"Hearts of the Innocent"	Aaron Sprinkle, Jon Micah Sumrall, Ryan Shrout	Hearts of the Innocent	3:50
2.	"Treason"	Sprinkle, Sumrall, Kyle Mitchell, James Mead, Shrout	Sea of Faces	3:19
3.	"Troubled Heart"	Sprinkle, Sumrall, Mitchell, Mead, Shrout	Sea of Faces	3:51
4.	"Shut Me Out"	Sumrall, Ethan Luck	Hearts of the Innocent	6:04
5.	"Sea of Faces"	Sprinkle, Sumrall, Mitchell, Mead, Shrout	Sea of Faces	4:06
6.	"Strong Tower"	Marc Byrd, Mark Lee, Sprinkle, Sumrall	Strong Tower	4:00
7.	"Better Is One Day"	Matt Redman	Strong Tower	5:16
8.	"Run"	Sumrall, Mitchell, Mead, Shrout, Nathan Stuart	Kutless	5:02
9.	"Pride Away"	Ben Hulburt, Sumrall, Mitchell, Mead, Shrout, Stuart	Kutless	4:02
10.	"Tonight"	Sumrall, Mitchell, Mead, Shrout, Stuart	Kutless	4:15
11.	"Let You In"	Sprinkle, Sumrall, Mitchell, Mead, Shrout	Sea of Faces	3:29
12.	"Somewhere in the Sky"	Sumrall, Mead	Hearts of the Innocent	3:04
13.	"Not What You See"	Sprinkle, Sumrall, Mitchell, Mead, Shrout	Sea of Faces	4:06
14.	"Beyond the Surface"	Sprinkle, Sumrall, Mead	Hearts of the Innocent	3:14
15.	"Your Touch"	Sumrall, Mitchell, Mead, Shrout, Stuart	Kutless	5:22
Total length:				63:00

== Personnel ==
Kutless

- Jon Micah Sumrall – lead vocals
- James Mead – guitars, backing vocals
- Ryan Shrout – guitars, backing vocals
- Dave Leutkenhoelter – bass
- Jeffrey Gilbert – drums

=== Production ===
- Brandon Ebel – executive producer
- Tyson Paoletti – executive producer
- Kevin Sheppard – A&R
- Zach Hodges – producer
- J.R. McNeely – producer, mixing
- Rob Burrell – recording
- Troy Glessner – mastering at Spectre Studios (Tacoma, Washington)
- Ed Janiszewski – production manager
- Invisible Creatures, Inc. – art direction
- Don Clark – design
- Bryan Myss – photography
- Chance Hoag and Darren Tyler at Platform Artis Management – management

== Awards ==
In 2008, the album received a nomination for a Dove Award for Long Form Music Video of the Year at the 39th GMA Dove Awards.
