= Time to Fly =

Time to Fly may refer to:

- Time to Fly (band), an American a rock band
- Time to Fly (album), a Sea of Green album
- "Part Three: Time to Fly", an episode of Ahsoka
- Time To Fly (Lithuanian company)
  - Time To Fly Backplane SL
  - Time To Fly Racket
