= Promise You =

Promise You may refer to:

- "Promise You" (Super Junior-K.R.Y song)
- "Promise You", a song on the Kutless album To Know That You're Alive
- "Promise You", a song by NCT 127 from their album Sticker
