= Faith & Family (album) =

Studio album by Jon Micah Sumrall
- Released: February 24, 2015
- Genre: Contemporary Christian music: contemporary worship music; pop rock
- Length: 45:04
- Label: BEC
- Producer: Dave Lubben: Jon Micah Sumrall

Faith & Family is the debut studio album by American singer and Kutless lead vocalist Jon Micah Sumrall. BEC Recordings released the album on February 24, 2015. Sumrall worked with Dave Lubben, in the production of this album.

== Critical reception ==
Professional ratings
Review scores
Source	Rating
365 Days of Inspiring Media	3.5/5 stars
CCM Magazine	3.5/5 stars
Christian Music Review	3.6/5
Christian Review	4/5 stars
Jesus Freak Hideout	3/5 stars
Louder Than the Music	3/5 stars

Giving the album three and a half stars from CCM Magazine, Matt Conner wrote, "The tender acoustic set should please both Kutless fans who see a softer side as well as AC listeners". Scott Fryberger, rating the album three stars for Jesus Freak Hideout, said, "Faith & Family is a pretty by-the-book Christian contemporary pop album." In another three star review by the same publication, Christopher Smith wrote, "Faith & Family is a pleasing listen, but it lacks the components of a memorable record." Awarding the album four stars at Christian Review Magazine, Christian St. John wrote, "Every track on Faith & Family is well written and played." Laura Chambers, giving the album a 3.6 out of 5 for Christian Music Review, wrote, "Faith and Family is a scrapbook of days past, struggles borne and hopes realized." Rating the album three stars from Louder Than the Music, Philip Aldis said, "Faith and Family is a collection of perfectly produced sounds that sweetly pan from my left ear to my right." Joshua Andre, awarding the album three and a half stars at 365 Days of Inspiring Media, wrote, "With acoustic, worship and pop/rock all working together in harmony; Faith And Family is sure to wow us."

== Track listing ==
No.	Title	Writer(s)	Length
1.	"Faith Hope Love"	Dave Lubben, Jon Micah Sumrall	4:03
2.	"How You Love Me"	Lubben, Sumrall	3:29
3.	"What I'm Trying to Say"	Sumrall	4:48
4.	"Our Hearts"	Lubben, Sumrall	4:35
5.	"Psalm 56"	Nick De Partee, Sumrall	4:11
6.	"King & Savior"	Lubben, Sumrall	3:46
7.	"The One I Love"	Sumrall	4:05
8.	"Soul on Fire"	Russ Leel, Lubben, Sumrall	3:41
9.	"Love like You"	Lubben, Sumrall	3:52
10.	"Marching On"	Lubben, Sumrall	4:25
11.	"Picture"	Sumrall	4:08
Total length:			45:04

== Personnel ==
- Jon Micah Sumrall – vocals, backing vocals, acoustic piano, keyboards, acoustic guitar, cello
- Dave Lubben – keyboards, acoustic guitar, electric guitars, percussion, backing vocals
- Paul Brainard – pedal steel guitar
- Ben Peterson – bass
- Colby Goddard – drums
