= Not What You See =

Not What You See may refer to:

- "Not What You See", a song by Savatage on their album Dead Winter Dead
- "Not What You See", a song by Kutless on their album Sea of Faces
