= What Faith Can Do =

Single by Kutless

from the album It Is Well
- Released: September 18, 2009
- Recorded: 2009
- Studio: Townsend Sound (Franklin, TN)
- Genre: Christian rock; soft rock; worship
- Length: 3:53
- Label: BEC Recordings
- Songwriters: Scott Davis; Scott Krippayne
- Producers: Brown Bannister; Dave Lubben; Kutless; Tyson Paoletti (executive)

Kutless singles chronology
"I Do Not Belong" (2009)	"What Faith Can Do" (2009)	"Everything I Need" (2010)

Music video
- "What Faith Can Do" on YouTube

"What Faith Can Do" is a song by American Christian rock band Kutless from their 2009 album It Is Well. It was released on September 18, 2009, as the lead single. The song became the group's first Hot Christian Songs No. 1, staying there for eight weeks. It lasted 47 weeks on the overall chart. The song is played in a D major key at 138 beats per minute.

== Background ==
"What Faith Can Do" was released on September 18, 2009, as the lead single for their sixth studio album It Is Well. The song's purpose is to encourage the listener that God's power is real and what is can do for you. The band's lead singer, Jon Micah Sumrall, told NewReleaseToday more behind the track,"That song seems to be an example of touching people and us as a band in the 'right place at the right time.' The song is all about putting all of our hope and trust in God, and the song is encouraging to us as a band. We've had some crazy things happen to us this past year, and the song reminds me of that picture of the two sets of footprints in the sand and when there is only one set of footprints, that's when Jesus is carrying us. 'What Can Faith Do' has become an inspirational banner song for anyone who has been struggling with major battles or life issues. It's been a huge success, and we felt very blessed when we heard stories about how the message has impacted people's lives." He also included: "'What Faith Can Do' reminds believers that God is always here. Never forget that. In times of great happiness or great struggle, He remains faithful. Remain faithful to Him. Turn to Him and believe that nothing is impossible with God. That's what faith can do. The take-away message is to know that God cares for you personally and that He wants a personal relationship with each and every one of us. For believers, the song is a reminder about making a faithful commitment to live with the kind of faith that God calls each of us to have."

== Music video ==
The music video for the single "What Faith Can Do" was released on February 12, 2010.

== Track listing ==
CD release

1. "What Faith Can Do" – 3:58
2. "What Faith Can Do (Medium Key Performance Track with Background Vocals)" – 3:58
3. "What Faith Can Do (High Key Performance Track / No Background Vocals)" – 3:58
4. "What Faith Can Do (Medium Key Performance Track / No Background Vocals)" – 3:58
5. "What Faith Can Do (High Key Performance Track / No Background Vocals)" – 3:53

== Personnel ==
- Jon Micah Sumrall - lead vocals, backing vocals
- Luke Brown - backing vocals
- James Mead - rhythm guitars, backing vocals
- Nick De Partee - lead guitars, backing vocals
- Matt Stanfield - piano, electric piano, organ, synthesizer
- Dave Luetkenhoelter - bass guitar
- Jeffery Gilbert - drums

== Charts ==
=== Weekly charts ===
Chart (2010)	Peak position
US Bubbling Under Hot 100 (Billboard)	19
US Christian AC (Billboard)	1
US Christian Airplay (Billboard)	1
US Hot Christian Songs (Billboard)	1
US Christian AC Indicator (Billboard)	1
US Christian Soft AC (Billboard)	1
US Heatseekers Songs (Billboard)	14

=== Year-end charts ===
Chart (2010)	Peak position
US Christian Songs (Billboard)	43
Chart (2011)	Peak position
US Christian Songs (Billboard)	2

=== Decade-end charts ===
Chart (2010s)	Position
US Christian Songs (Billboard)	31
