= Surrender (Kutless album) =

Studio album by Kutless
- Released: November 13, 2015
- Studios: The Pier (Thompson's Station, Tennessee): The Holiday Ian (Franklin, Tennessee); OmniSound Studios (Nashville, Tennessee)
- Genres: Christian rock; hard rock; worship
- Length: 37:58
- Label: BEC
- Producer: Aaron Sprinkle: Ian Eskelin

Kutless chronology
Glory (2014)	Surrender (2015)	Alpha / Omega (2017)

Surrender is the ninth studio album by the Christian rock band Kutless. It was released by BEC Recordings on November 13, 2015. This album marks the return of long-time producer Aaron Sprinkle; the band's first record with him since Hearts of the Innocent in 2006. This is also the first album to feature bassist Neal Cameron and drummer Drew Porter, the latter of whom replaced previous drummer Kyle Peek.

== History ==
On November 6, 2015, the song "Mirror" was released.

== Critical reception ==
Professional ratings
Review scores
Source	Rating
365 Days of Inspiring Media	4/5 stars
CCM Magazine	3.5/5 stars
The Christian Beat	4.7/5
HM Magazine	3/5 stars
Jesus Freak Hideout	3.5/5 stars
Jesus Wired	95/100
New Release Today	4/5 stars
Today's Christian Entertainment	4.6/5 stars

Signaling in a three and a half star review from CCM Magazine, Matt Conner recognizes, "the band stays true to form on Surrender". Jordan Gonzalez, indicating in a three star review by HM Magazine, responds, "Surrender isn't a bad album, but it's not impressive, either." Awarding the album four stars at New Release Today, Jonathan J. Francesco states, "Kutless is back! Maybe not quite better than ever, but with a strong and satisfying return to the sound that made them famous. Surrender is a success and should give those who missed a rocking Kutless the album they've spent the better part of a decade waiting for." Christopher Smith, giving the album three and a half stars for Jesus Freak Hideout, writes, "Kutless fans old and new will want to give Surrender a spin...It's not without its hiccups, but you might be surprised how much you'll like it." Rating the album a 4.7 out of five from The Christian Beat, Chris Major says, "Surrender is a powerful, impactful collection of praise and worship." Joshua Andre, indicating in a four star review at 365 Days of Inspiring Media, responds, "With hard rock, CCM, worship and pop/rock all working together in harmony; Surrender is sure to impact the lives of many, and surprise us all in a good way!" Allotting the album 4.6 stars from Today's Christian Entertainment, Jay Heilman replies, "Surrender is an album that new and old fans alike will enjoy for a long time to come." Sam Carothers, indicating in a 95 out of 100 review from Jesus Wired, writes, "Surrender is satisfying to fans new and old with its elements of edgy rock infused with straight-up contemporary worship."

== Track listing ==
Surrender track listing
No.	Title	Writer(s)	Length
1.	"Tear It Up"	James Mead; Jon Micah Sumrall; Aaron Sprinkle	3:04
2.	"Bring It On"	Sumrall; Ian Eskelin; Tony Wood; Barry Weeks	3:18
3.	"Mirror"	Mead; Nick de Partee	3:37
4.	"Love Come Crashing Down"	Sumrall; Eskelin; Wood; Brian White	2:58
5.	"I Will Go"	Sumrall; Matt Arcaini; Josiah Prince; Wood	3:29
6.	"Overcome"	Scott Krippayne; Sumrall; Mead	3:32
7.	"Not Too Far"	Mead; Sumrall; Sprinkle	3:43
8.	"Loved"	Krippayne; Bryan Reynolds	3:54
9.	"One Thing Remains"	Brian Johnson; Christa Black Gifford; Jeremy Riddle	4:44
10.	"My Heart Is a Ghost"	Mead; Sumrall; Sprinkle	5:39
Total length:			37:58

== Personnel ==
Kutless

- Jon Micah Sumrall – lead and backing vocals, acoustic piano
- James Mead – guitars (1, 3, 5–10)
- Neal Cameron – bass guitar, backing vocals (photographed in the album booklet's liner notes, but does not perform on the album)
- Drew Porter – drums (1, 3, 5–10)

Additional musicians

Tracks #1, 3 & 5–10

- Aaron Sprinkle – keyboards, programming, additional guitars, bass, percussion, additional vocals
- Jesse Sprinkle – drums

Tracks #2 & 4

- Mike Payne – guitars
- Tony Lucido – bass
- Ben Phillips – drums

== Production ==
Tracks #1, 3 & 5–10

- Aaron Sprinkle – producer, engineer
- Lee Unfried – drum engineering at OMNISound, Nashville, Tennessee
- Josh Auer – mixing
- Troy Glessner – mastering for Spectre Mastering (Seattle, Washington)
- Jon Micah Sumrall – vocal and guitar engineering, additional production
- James Mead – vocal and guitar engineering, additional production
- Brian Moore – drum technician

Tracks #2 & 4

- Ian Eskelin – producer
- Barry Weeks – engineer
- Anthony Porcheddu – additional engineering and programming
- Ainslie Grosser – mixing

Additional credits

- Conor Farley – A&R
- Chris Edmiston – management for West Coast Artist Management
- Nick de Partee – album design for Equal Seven Creative (equalseven.com)
- Eric Brown – photography for Eric Brown Photo (ericbrownphoto.com)

== Chart performance ==
Chart (2015)	Peak position
US Top Christian Albums (Billboard)	13
US Independent Albums (Billboard)	24
US Top Rock Albums (Billboard)	37

== Awards and nominations ==
In 2016, 'Surrender' was nominated for a Dove Award for 'Best Rock/Contemporary Album of the Year'.
