= Aaron Sprinkle =

American record producer

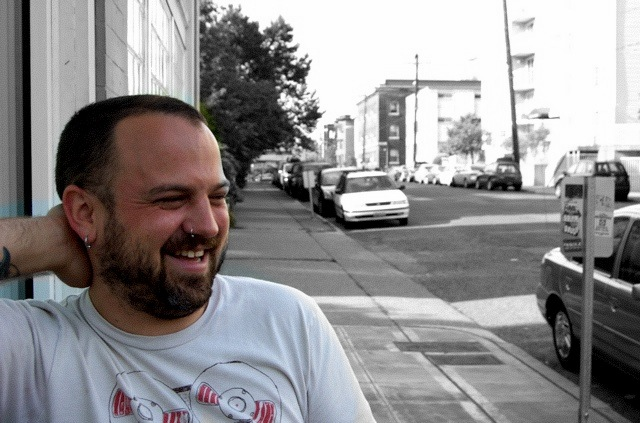

Background information
- Born: March 20, 1974 (age 52)
- Origin: Seattle, Washington, U.S.
- Genres: Alternative rock
- Occupations: Record producer, recording engineer, musician, songwriter
- Instruments: Guitar, vocals, keyboards, percussion
- Years active: 1990–present
- Labels: Tooth & Nail, Silent Planet, Organic
- Website: aaronsprinklemusic.com

Aaron Sprinkle (born March 20, 1974) is an American record producer and musician from Seattle, Washington.

== Career ==
His career in music began in high school with a group called BellBangVilla. BellBangVilla became Poor Old Lu and they released a number of albums (see below). Aaron Sprinkle also sang and played lead guitar in Rose Blossom Punch, and has produced albums independently. On his solo releases, he plays almost all instruments except drums. He produced dozens of records for Tooth & Nail Records between 1993 and 2016. In 2005, Sprinkle formed the band Fair with Joey Sanchez, Nick Barber, and Erick Newbill. Fair released its debut album The Best Worst-Case Scenario on Tooth & Nail Records in June 2006. He is the brother of drummer Jesse Sprinkle. Among others, Jesse played with Aaron in Poor Old Lu, was the most recent drummer of Dead Poetic, and was also an early member of Demon Hunter, whose albums Aaron has produced the majority of.

== Discography ==
=== Solo (1999–present) ===
- Moontraveler (1999)
- The Kindest Days (2000)
- Really Something EP (2001)
- Bareface (2001)
- Live: The Boy Who Stopped the World (2003)
- Lackluster – Best Of (2004)
- Water & Guns (2013)
- Real Life (2017)
- Escaping Light (2018)
- Instrumentals, Vol. 1: Alexandria (2018)
- Instrumentals, Vol. 2: Unravel (2019)
- Instrumentals, Vol. 3: North Coast (2019)
- Instrumentals, Vol. 4: Feather Falling (2021)
- Walking Back (2021)
- Certainty (2021)

=== With Poor Old Lu (1990–2002) ===
- In Love with the Greenery (As BellBangVilla) (1990)
- Three Song Demo (Cassette only) (1991)
- Star-Studded-Super-Step (1992, 1995 & 1998)
- Mindsize (1993)
- Split 7″ with Mortal (1993)
- Sin (1994)
- Straight Six (1995)
- A Picture of the Eighth Wonder (1996)
- In Their Final Performance (1998)
- Chrono [1993-1998] (1998)
- The Waiting Room (2002)

=== With Rose Blossom Punch (1997–1999) ===
- Ephemere (1997)
- So Sorry to Disappoint You (1999)
- Par Avion 7″ vinyl

=== With Fair (2006–present) ===
- The Best Worst-Case Scenario (2006)
- "Carelessness" (CD single) (2006)
- Disappearing World (2010)

=== With Blank Books (2017–present) ===
- EP1 (2017)

=== Contributions ===
==== Solo ====
- "A Christmas Song for All Year Round" (from Happy Christmas Volume 3 – 2001, Tooth & Nail Records)
- "I Know There's an Answer (Hang On to Your Ego)" (from Making God Smile: An Artists' Tribute to the Songs of Beach Boy Brian Wilson – 2002, Silent Planet Records)

==== With Rose Blossom Punch ====
- "Sowing in the Sun" (from Artcore Vol. I – 1996, Tooth & Nail Records)
- "Based on a True Story (Demo)" (from Music for Meals: Take Time to Listen Vol. III – 1997, SaraBellum Records)
- "See It in Me" (from Artcore Vol. II – Tooth & Nail Records)

== Production work ==
Aaron has production, engineering, or other credits on albums by the following bands:

- Aaron Gillespie
  - Producer, engineering, co-writer, and additional instruments and vocals on Anthem Song
- Acceptance
  - Producer on Black Lines to Battlefields, Phantoms, and Colliding By Design
- Adie
  - Producer on Don't Wait
- The Almost
  - Producer and additional vocals on Southern Weather
  - Producer on Monster Monster
- Anberlin
  - Producer, engineering, and mixing on Blueprints for the Black Market
  - Producer and engineering on Never Take Friendship Personal
  - Producer on Godspeed EP and Cities
  - Producer and engineering on Vital
  - Vocal production and engineering on Lowborn
- Beth Orton
- Blenderhead
  - Producer on Prime Candidate for Burnout
- Brooke Barrettsmith
  - Producer on Brooke Barrettsmith
- Bugs in Amber
  - Mixing and instruments on Rocketship Letters
- Capital Lights
  - Producer of This Is an Outrage!
- Calibretto 13
  - Producer on Adventures in Tokyo
- Copeland
  - Co-producer of You Are My Sunshine
- Damien Jurado
  - Mixer on I Break Chairs
- Dead Poetic
  - Producer of New Medicines, Vices and The Finest
- Demon Hunter
  - Producer on all albums (except Live in Nashville, 45 Days, War, and Exile.)
  - Co-producer, programming, and keyboards on Storm the Gates of Hell
  - Co-producer on Extremist
  - Keyboards on The Triptych
- Disciple
  - Producer on Long Live the Rebels
- Dolour
  - Co-producer of Suburbiac
- Eisley
  - Co-producer of Marvelous Things E.P. and Room Noises
- Emery
  - Producer on The Question and ...In Shallow Seas We Sail
  - Additional vocals for ...In Shallow Seas We Sail
  - Additional instruments and vocals on We Do What We Want
- Every Avenue
  - Producer on Bad Habits
- Falling Up
  - Producer on Crashings
  - Co-writer and producer on Captiva
- FM Static
  - Producer of What Are You Waiting For?
  - Co-producer of Dear Diary and My Brain Says Stop, But My Heart Says Go!
- Gatsbys American Dream
  - Producer of Why We Fight
- Grammatrain
  - Producer of Lonely House
- Hawk Nelson
  - Co-producer of Letters to the President
  - Producer of Smile, It's the End of the World
- He Is We
  - Producer of My Forever
- Hyland
  - Producer of Weights & Measures
- Icon for Hire
  - Co-producer on Scripted
- Ivoryline
  - Producer of There Came a Lion and Vessels
- Jeremy Camp
  - Producer and instruments on Restored
  - Co-producer on Beyond Measure
- Jonezetta
  - Producer of Cruel to Be Young
- Joy Electric
  - Mixer on The Tick Tock Treasury
  - Co-mixer on Hello, Mannequin
- KJ-52
  - Producer on Behind the Musik (A Boy Named Jonah)
  - Co-producer on Dangerous
- Kutless
  - Producer on Kutless, Sea of Faces, Strong Tower, Hearts of the Innocent and Surrender
  - Co-writer of Sea of Faces and Alpha / Omega
- Little Champions
  - Audio Mixer on Pillow
- Mae
  - Co-producer on Destination: B-Sides
- MxPx
  - Producer on Pokinatcha and Secret Weapon
- The Museum
  - Producer on Let Love Win
- New Found Glory
  - Producer of Makes Me Sick
- Nine Lashes
  - Co-producer of World We View and From Water to War
- Number One Gun
  - Producer of The North Pole Project and Promises for the Imperfect
- Pedro the Lion
  - Co-writer on Control
- Poema
  - Producer of Sing It Now
- Project 86
  - Co-producer on Songs to Burn Your Bridges By
- Relient K
  - Co-producer on Collapsible Lung
- Rocky Votolato
  - Audio mixer on Makers
- Ruth
  - Producer of Secondhand Dreaming
  - Co-producer of Anorak
- The Send
  - Producer, additional vocals and instruments from Cosmos
- Sent By Ravens
  - Producer of Our Graceful Words
- Seven Places
  - Producer of Lonely for the Last Time and Hear Us Say Jesus
- Seventh Day Slumber
  - Producer of Once Upon a Shattered Life
- Sherri Youngward
  - Producer of Six Inches of Sky
- Sometime Sunday
  - Mixing and instruments on Drain
- Soulfood 76
  - Engineering on Velour
- Squad Five-O
  - Solo guitar on 2 tracks on Fight The System
- Starflyer 59
  - Producer, engineering, and mixing on Old
- States
  - Producer on Room To Run re-release
- Stavesacre
  - Producer, engineering, and instruments on Collective
- Story of the Year
  - Producer on Wolves
- Swimming With Dolphins
  - Co-producer of Water Colours
- Time to Fly
  - Producer on Birth. Work. Death
- The Divorce
  - Engineering on The Divorce EP
- Thousand Foot Krutch
  - Producer on Phenomenon, Welcome to the Masquerade, The End Is Where We Begin, Oxygen: Inhale, and Exhale
- Wes Dando
  - Producer and co-engineer on The Tired Hours
- Zao
  - Co-producer on Legendary
