= Paper Tapes =

Studio album by The Lonely Hearts
- Released: March 7, 2006 (U.S.)
- Genre: Christian rock
- Length: 38:46
- Label: Tooth & Nail
- Producer: Rob Hawkins

The Lonely Hearts chronology
Photographs & Tidalwaves (as Holland) (2003)	Paper Tapes (2006)

Professional ratings
Review scores
Source	Rating
Jesus Freak Hideout	4.5/5 stars
Christianity Today	4/5 stars

Paper Tapes is the debut album by the band The Lonely Hearts. A previous album, Photographs & Tidalwaves was recorded under the name "Holland," which was changed for legal reasons; the composition of the group also changed at the same time.

== Track listing ==
1. "Passive Aggressive"
2. "Mermaid"
3. "Love Comes Quickly"
4. "Heartbreaker"
5. "Weary Eyes"
6. "Love and Politics"
7. "Death of Me"
8. "War Brides"
9. "Good Intentions"
10. "Movie Night"
