= The Seventh Seal (Kutless EP) =

2025 EP by Kutless

EP by Kutless
- Released: June 27, 2025

Kutless chronology
Lies of My Brothers (2025)	The Seventh Seal (2025)

The Seventh Seal is the third studio extended play by Christian rock band Kutless. It was released on June 27, 2025.

== Track listing ==
All lyrics written by James Mead and Josiah Prince, except where noted.

No.	Title	Writer(s)	Length
1.	"End of the World"	Mead, Prince	5:55
2.	"Midnight"	Mead, Prince	3:49
3.	"Words of Fire"	Mead, Prince	4:12
4.	"Breakthrough"	Jon Micah Sumrall, Mead, Prince	4:35
5.	"Lies of My Brothers"	Mead, Prince	3:52
6.	"Hold On"	Dawn Michele, Mead, Prince	4:51

== Personnel ==
Kutless

- Jon Micah Sumrall - lead vocals
- James Mead - rhythm guitar, backing vocals
- Nathan Parrish - lead guitar
- Neal Cameron - bass guitar
- Matt Christopherson - drums

=== Additional musicians ===
- Dawn Michele - additional vocals on "Hold On"

=== Production ===
- Josiah Prince - producer
- Brian Ortize - A and R administrator
- Nick Rad - mixing
- Mike Cervantes - mastering

== Singles ==
- "Words of Fire"
- "End of the World"
- "Midnight"
- "Lies of My Brothers"
