= Photographs & Tidalwaves =

Studio album by Holland (now The Lonely Hearts)
- Released: February 11, 2003
- Genre: Christian rock
- Length: 45:41
- Label: Tooth & Nail
- Producer: Aaron Sprinkle

Holland (now The Lonely Hearts) chronology
| Photographs & Tidalwaves (2003) | Paper Tapes (as The Lonely Hearts) (2006) |

Professional ratings
Review scores
| Source | Rating |
|---|---|
| Jesus Freak Hideout | 4/5 stars |
| Christianity Today | 3/5 stars |

Photographs & Tidalwaves is the first (and only) album by the band Holland; soon afterwards, they were forced by legal reasons to change their name. Along with their new name of The Lonely Hearts, they also changed some of their lineup and musical style.

== Track listing ==
1. "The Whole World"
2. "I’m Not Backing Down"
3. "Shine Like Stars"
4. "Because of You"
5. "One Minute To Zero"
6. "Call It a Day"
7. "The West Coast"
8. "Bring Back July"
9. "Genetics"
10. "Losing Jim"
11. "Goodnight Texas"
12. "Photographs and Tidalwaves"
