= Adventures in Tokyo =

Adventures In Tokyo

Studio album by Calibretto 13
- Released: March 12, 2002
- Genre: Folk punk, Alternative rock, Christian alternative rock
- Length: 52:00
- Label: Tooth & Nail
- Producer: Aaron Sprinkle

Calibretto 13 chronology
From the Secret Files of the Danger Brigade (EP) (2001)	Adventures In Tokyo (2002)	Dead By Dawn (EP) (2003)

Professional ratings
Review scores
Source	Rating
Allmusic	2/5 stars
Jesus Freak Hideout	4/5 stars

Adventures In Tokyo is the second full-length album by Christian rock band Calibretto 13 released on March 12, 2002.

== Track listing ==
1. "Why Can't I Be On MTV?"
2. "Dear Beelzebubba"
3. "Cruisin' the Strip"
4. "Sheep of The U.S."
5. "From Me To You"
6. "Hollywood (Is Burning Down)"
7. "I'll Show the World"
8. "The Night They Took You"
9. "Father"
10. "The Proposal"
11. "I'll Talk to You Tomorrow"
12. "America" *

*A bonus track that appears after "America" contains a rather lengthy sequence of audio clips compiled from messages left by the band members on each other's answering machines and voice mails.
