= You Alone (song) =

Single by Kutless

from the album Glory
- Released: October 15, 2013
- Genre: Christian rock, Christian alternative rock, Contemporary worship music
- Length: 4:13
- Label: BEC
- Songwriter(s): Dave Lubben, James Mead, Nick De Partee
- Producer(s): Lubben

Kutless singles chronology
"Believer'" (2012)	"You Alone" (2013)	"Always" (2014)

"You Alone" is the lead single on Kutless's eighth studio album Glory. It was released on October 15, 2013, by BEC Recordings, and it was co-written by Dave Lubben, James Mead, Nick De Partee and produced by Lubben.

== Weekly charts ==
Chart (2013–14)	Peak position
Billboard Christian Songs	29
Billboard Christian AC	25
Billboard Christian AC/CHR	5
Billboard Christian AC Indicator	18
Billboard Christian Airplay	28
