= The Lonely Hearts =

Rock band from Nashville, Tennessee

- Also known as: Holland, Somerset
- Origin: Nashville, Tennessee, U.S.
- Genres: Rock, rock and roll, blues, country, R&B
- Years active: 2006–present
- Labels: Tooth & Nail
- Members: Will Morgan Holland; Josiah Holland; Jeremy Branon; Dave Coleman; Joey Sanchez
- Past members: Ethan Luck; Timothy "Yogi" Watts; Steve Barlow; Jonathan Todryk
- Website: holland.com/thelonelyhearts

The Lonely Hearts are an Americana and rock band formed in 2003 in Nashville, Tennessee by brothers Will and Josiah Holland. They have released one full-length album, Paper Tapes.

== History ==
Prior to The Lonely Hearts, they were called Holland, and released an album called Photographs and Tidal Waves on Tooth and Nail. Before that they were called Somerset.

The Lonely Hearts started as a four-piece while living in Nashville. The Holland brothers are the only remaining original members. They released Paper Tapes through Tooth & Nail on March 7, 2006, but later worked independently.

== Members ==
- Will Morgan Holland - vocals, guitar
- Josiah Holland - vocals, keyboards, accordion
- Jeremy Branon - bass
- Joey Sanchez - drums
- Dave Coleman - vocals, guitar

== Discography ==
=== Albums ===
- Photographs & Tidalwaves (2003), Tooth & Nail - as Holland
- Paper Tapes (March 7, 2006), Tooth & Nail
- Born in the Dark (2008), independent release
