= Glory (Kutless album) =

Studio album by Kutless
- Released: February 11, 2014
- Studio: Blue Rooms (Portland, Oregon): Ripcord Recording Studios (Vancouver, Washington); The Holiday Ian (Franklin, Tennessee)
- Genre: Christian rock, contemporary worship music
- Length: 48:48
- Label: BEC
- Producer: Ian Eskelin: Dave Lubben

Kutless chronology
Believer (2012)	Glory (2014)	Surrender (2015)

Singles from Glory
- 1. "You Alone" Released: 2013; 2. "Never Too Late" Released: 2014; 3. "In Jesus' Name" Released: 2014

Glory is the eighth studio album from Christian rock band Kutless, and the album released on February 11, 2014, by BEC Recordings. It is the band's final album with long-time rhythm guitarist Nick DePartee, as well as their only album with drummer Kyle Peek.. The producers on the album were Ian Eskelin and Dave Lubben. This album received generally positive reception from critics.

== Critical reception ==
Professional ratings
Review scores
Source	Rating
CCM Magazine	3/5 stars
Cross Rhythms	8/10 squares
CM Addict	4.5/5 stars
The Front Row Report	9/10 stars
HM Magazine	3/5 stars
Indie Vision Music	3/5 stars
Jesus Freak Hideout	2.5/5 stars 1/5 stars 2/5 stars
Louder Than the Music	4/5 stars
New Release Tuesday	4/5 stars

Glory garnered generally positive reception from twelve music critics. Grace S. Aspinwall of CCM Magazine rated the album three stars out of five, calling the album "accessible to the everyday worship leader in small town America as it is to the players on music row." At HM, Sarah Brehm rated the album three stars, noting that on the album "musicianship is satisfactory, it’s that most of the tracks aren’t memorable", and "the songs have a hard time distinguishing themselves from one another [...] a common problem with worship albums." Jonathan Andre of Indie Vision Music rated the album three stars, writing that the release "is certain to draw some critics and commendable words alike." At New Release Tuesday, Mary Nikkel rated the album four stars, stating that "Although this album doesn't bring a lot of innovation or fresh insight to the airwaves, it's a solid and uplifting offering that could easily become a staple in the listener's worship library."

Christian Music Reviews' Daniel Edgeman rated the album four and one fifths out of five, indicating that he can tell the band put in some hard work on the release, and it "is probably one of the best and most mature work the band has put out." At Louder Than the Music, Jono Davies rated the album four stars, saying that the album comes "With some stunning worshipful music", which is chock "full of great lyrics about God [that's] all about turning the listener's attention to the Glory of God, and it does it so well." Emily Kjonaas of Christian Music Zine rated the album four and three fourths out of five, highlighting that "Glory is further proof that they are a force to be reckoned with." At The Front Row Report, Reggie Edwards rated the album nine out of ten, stating that the album gets really close to being the band's best release.

Julia Kitzing of CM Addict rated the album four-and-a-half stars, affirming that "each one has hard hitting lyrics that will make you stop and reflect on what Jesus has done for us", and felt that "It's an album full of original worship songs that point you to the cross." At Jesus Freak Hideout, Alex "Tincan" Caldwell rated the album two-and-a-half stars, indicating that "while containing some nice moments, [the album] feels like an assignment that was not given the student's undivided attention and does not demonstrate their full potential." Jerold Wallace rated the album a one star, writing that "Glory isn't a bad album, but simply ordinary." Founder John DiBiase rated the album two stars, saying that the release "brings nothing new at all to the table."

== Commercial performance ==
For the Billboard charting week of March 1, 2014, Glory was the No.105 most sold album in the entirety of the United States via the Billboard 200 and it was the No. 5 most sold album in the Christian category by the Christian Albums charting. Also, the album was the No. 24 most sold album on the Top Rock Albums chart, and on the Top Alternative Albums chart it was the No. 17 most sold. The album was the No. 18 most sold on the Independent Albums chart.

== Track listing ==
Standard track listing
No.	Title	Writer(s)	Length
1.	"Revelation"	Scott Krippayne, James Mead, Jon Micah Sumrall	4:49
2.	"In Jesus' Name"	Chad Bohi, Nick De Partee	4:16
3.	"You Alone"	Dave Lubben, Mead, De Partee	4:14
4.	"Never Too Late"	Ian Eskelin, Tim Rushlow, Tony Wood	3:13
5.	"All To You"	Lubben, De Partee	4:19
6.	"We Lift You Up"	Lubben, De Partee, Sumrall	3:48
7.	"We Will Worship"	Jonathan Smith, Sumrall, Wood	4:02
8.	"Rest"	Lubben, De Partee, Sumrall	3:34
9.	"Restore Me"	Krippayne, Lubben, De Partee	5:00
10.	"God Rest My Soul"	Bryan Brown, Lubben, Dave Luetkenhoelter, De Partee, Sumrall	3:43
11.	"Always"	Lubben, Sumrall	4:29
12.	"In the City"	Lubben, De Partee	3:21
Total length:			48:48

Deluxe track listing
No.	Title	Length
13.	"Children of God"	4:04
14.	"At the Cross"	3:23
15.	"Unto You"	4:40
16.	"Shining"	4:03
17.	"You Alone" (demo version)	4:02
18.	"Always" (demo version)	4:29
Total length:		73:29

== Personnel ==
Kutless

- Jon Micah Sumrall – lead and backing vocals
- James Mead – lead guitars
- Nick De Partee – rhythm guitars
- Kyle Peek – drums, percussion

Additional Musicians

Tracks #1–3 & 5–12

- Dave Lubben – keyboards, programming, guitars, bass, percussion, backing vocals

Track #4

- Tim Lauer – keyboards
- Anthony Porcheddu – keyboards
- Mike Payne – additional guitars
- Tony Lucido – bass
- Shannon Forrest – drums
- John Catchings – cello
- Monisa Angell – viola
- David Angell – violin
- David Davidson – violin
- Luke Brown – backing vocals

== Production ==
Tracks #1–3 & 5–12

- Dave Lubben – producer
- F. Reid Shippen – mixing
- Ted Jensen – mastering at Sterling Sound (New York City, New York)

Track #4

- Ian Eskelin – producer
- Aaron Shannon – recording
- Anthony Porcheddu – recording
- Baheo "Bobby" Shin – string recording
- Marc Laquesta – vocal recording, vocal editing
- Barry Weeks – vocal recording, vocal editing
- Ainslie Grosser – mixing
- Troy Glessner – mastering at Spectre Studios (Tacoma, Washington)

Additional Credits

- Nick De Partee – artwork, design
- Meghann Street Buswell – photography
- West Coast Artist Management – management

== Chart performance ==
Chart (2014)	Peak position
US Billboard 200	105
US Top Alternative Albums (Billboard)	17
US Christian Albums (Billboard)	5
US Independent Albums (Billboard)	18
US Top Rock Albums (Billboard)	24
