= Hear Us Say Jesus =

Studio album by Seven Places
- Released: October 5, 2004
- Genre: Christian rock, Christian pop
- Length: 46:49
- Label: BEC
- Producer: Aaron Sprinkle

Seven Places chronology
Lonely for the Last Time (2003)	Hear Us Say Jesus (2004)	Glowing (2007)

Professional ratings
Review scores
Source	Rating
Christian Music Today	(not rated)
Jesus Freak Hideout	(not rated)

Hear Us Say Jesus is the third full-length album by Seven Places on BEC Recordings. The album was released on October 5, 2004.

== Track listing ==
1. "Fall in Line" - 4:11
2. "Watch" - 4:02
3. "Even When" - 3:55
4. "Perspective" - 3:02
5. "I Look Upon Your Hill" - 3:54
6. "We're Almost There" - 3:23
7. "Lay It Down" - 3:14
8. "Someday Go" - 4:41
9. "See The Rain (Go Away)" - 2:41
10. "Be My Salvation" - 4:57
11. "All in My Head " - 3:32
12. "Holes in His Hands" 5:16

== Album credits ==
- Produced by Aaron Sprinkle
- Engineered by Zach Hodges
- Mixed by JR McNeely
- All songs written by Seth Gilbert
