= Cosmos (The Send album) =

Studio album by The Send
- Released: July 31, 2007
- Recorded: 2006
- Genre: Alternative rock
- Length: 53:26
- Label: Tooth & Nail
- Producer: Aaron Sprinkle

Singles from Cosmos
- 1. "An Epiphany" Released: 2007

Professional ratings
Review scores
Source	Rating
AbsolutePunk.net	(76%) link
CCM Magazine	(not rated)
Christian Music Today	3/5 stars
Jesus Freak Hideout	link

Cosmos is the debut album by The Send which was released on July 31, 2007 by Tooth & Nail Records. Joseph Kisselburgh teamed up with 'Aaron Sprinkle to "bring spiritual songs into existence from beyond," rather than force a pop record.' The first single is "An Epiphany". A video was released for this song on July 12, 2007. An e-card was released for the album by Tooth & Nail on July 24, 2007 and can be watched here.

Cosmos was available for pre-order, and came autographed with a free limited edition five-song vinyl LP.

== Track listing ==
1. "Need"
2. "Fairweather"
3. "An Epiphany"
4. "Blocking the Sun"
5. "Begin"
6. "The Fall"
7. "Drown"
8. "Santiam"
9. "The Science of the Sky"
10. "Dawn and Dusk"
11. "Say"
12. "Fire Colors"
13. "In Repose"

== Anticipation ==
Cosmos was placed #16 out of #25 on Jesus Freak Hideout's 2007 highlights. They also gave it a 'Pre-Order Worthy' certification and described it as having 'a lasting impression on the listener.'.

== Charts ==
Song	Chart	Position
"An Epiphany"	Christian Hit Radio	5
