= Time To Fly (Lithuanian company) =

Aircraft manufacturer

- Company type: Privately held company
- Industry: Aerospace
- Founded: 1997
- Defunct: 2004
- Headquarters: Kaunas, Lithuania
- Products: Paramotors

Time To Fly was a Lithuanian aircraft manufacturer based in Kaunas. The company specialized in the design and manufacture of paramotors in the form of ready-to-fly aircraft for the US FAR 103 Ultralight Vehicles rules and the European microlight category.

The company was founded in 1997 and seems to have gone out of business in 2004. The company's early designs used mostly the 15 hp (11 kW) Solo 210 powerplant, while later models, like the Backplane SL, have more powerful engines, like the 26 hp (19 kW) Simonini Mini 2 Plus.

The company also produced the Radne Raket 120-powered Time To Fly Racket and the compact Time To Fly Scooter.

== Aircraft ==
Summary of aircraft built by Time To Fly
Model name	First flight	Number built	Type
Time To Fly Backplane SL	mid-2000s		paramotor
Time To Fly Backplane	mid-2000s		paramotor
Time To Fly Racket	mid-2000s		paramotor
Time To Fly Scooter	mid-2000s		paramotor
