= Lonely for the Last Time =

Studio album by Seven Places
- Released: 2003
- Genres: Christian rock, Pop/Rock
- Label: BEC
- Producer: Aaron Sprinkle

Seven Places chronology
Lonely for the Last Time (2003)	Hear Us Say Jesus (2004)

Professional ratings
Review scores
Source	Rating
Christian Music Today	(not rated)
Jesus Freak Hideout	(not rated)

Lonely For The Last Time is the first full-length album by Seven Places on BEC Recordings.

== Track listing ==
1. "Yours" - (3:22)
2. "Everything" - (3:23)
3. "Landslide" - (2:36)
4. "Like It Never Happened" - (3:07)
5. "It Might Be Today" - (3:31)
6. "Along the Way" - (3:52)
7. "Lonely For The Last Time - (3:33)
8. "Thinking It Over" - (3:28)
9. "Into Your Heart" - (3:03)
10. "Stay The Same" - (2:59)
11. "The Western Wall" - (3:38)
12. "Little" - (5:41)
13. "Awakening" - (4:07)
- "Nothing Gold Can Stay" - (3:17)
- "Sleepers" - (4:06)

The newer version of Lonely For The Last Time has two other songs. They are titled "Nothing Gold Can Stay" and "Sleepers".

== Album credits ==
- Produced by Aaron Sprinkle
- Mixed by JR McNeely
- All songs written by Seven Places and John Mark Comer
