= Kutless (album) =

Studio album by Kutless
- Released: July 16, 2002
- Recorded: Compound Recordings
- Genres: Post-grunge; Christian rock; nu metal
- Length: 47:23
- Label: BEC
- Producer: Aaron Sprinkle

Kutless chronology
Kutless (2002)	Sea of Faces (2004)

Singles from Kutless
- 1. "Your Touch" Released: 2002; 2. "Run" Released: 2002; 3. "Tonight" Released: 2003; 4. "Pride Away" Released: 2003

Professional ratings
Review scores
Source	Rating
AllMusic	3/5 stars
Christianity Today	4/5 stars
Cross Rhythms	8/10 stars
Jesus Freak Hideout	2.5/5 stars

Kutless is the debut studio album by the American Christian rock band of the same name, released on July 16, 2002. The songs "Run" and "Your Touch" both reached No. 1 song on ChristianRock.net, and "Tonight" was in the Top 5. The album reached The Billboard Top Heatseekers Albums chart peaking at No. 48. The album also reached the Billboard Christian Albums chart peaking at No. 27. Lead vocalist Jon Micah Sumrall told in an interview that the album's sound was influenced by acts such as Linkin Park, Incubus, Nickelback and Staind. It is the only Kutless album to feature bassist Nathan Stuart, who left the band shortly after its release.

== Track listing ==
All tracks are written by Kutless.

Album release
No.	Title	Length
1.	"Your Touch"	4:23
2.	"In Me"	3:09
3.	"Run"	4:53
4.	"Vow"	4:16
5.	"Pride Away"	3:45
6.	"Down"	2:48
7.	"Again"	3:45
8.	"Dry"	3:28
9.	"Tonight"	4:23
10.	"This Time"	3:51
11.	"Saved"	3:52
12.	"Grace and Love"	4:43
Total length:		47:16

== Personnel ==
Kutless

- Jon Micah Sumrall – lead and backing vocals
- James Mead – rhythm guitar
- Ryan Shrout – lead guitar
- Nathan Stuart – bass guitar
- Kyle Mitchell – drums, percussion

Additional musicians

- Aaron Sprinkle – pianos, programming, loops, guitars
- Phillip A. Peterson – cello
- Ben Hulbert – rap (5)
- Danielle Capps – backing vocals (12)

Production

- Aaron Sprinkle – producer, engineer
- Brandon Ebel – executive producer
- J.R. McNeely – mixing at Hipposonic Studios
- Troy Glessner – mastering at Spectre Studio, Renton, Washington
- Asterik Studio – art direction, design, layout
- Kris McCaddon – band photography

Studios

- Recorded at Compound Recording, Seattle, Washington
- Piano recorded at Hipposonic Studios, Vancouver, B.C.
- Drums recorded at Spectre Studio, Tacoma, Washington

== Music videos ==
Three music videos were released for this album, the most of any Kutless album to date. The video for "Your Touch" consists of the band playing in an empty building and walking around the streets surrounding it. The video for "Tonight" includes many varied shots of the band on tour, from playing on stage to talking to fans to many other activities. Finally, the video for "Run" shows the band playing in a dark room while the video tells a story of a woman and a man who argue over a Bible that belongs to one of them, and it ends with the woman sitting down and reading the Bible. All three of these videos were included on various compilation DVDs, as well as the special edition DVD of Kutless' album Hearts of the Innocent.

Note: At 3:40, the music video of "Your Touch" is shorter than the album version of the song at 4:23.
