= Time to Fly (band) =

American rock band

- Origin: Port Orchard, Washington, USA
- Genres: Emo; Indie rock
- Years active: 2001–2005
- Label: Rocketstar Recordings
- Past members: Tyler Lewis; Kyle Buckingham; Danny Lewis; David Nichols

Time to Fly was a rock band based in Port Orchard, Washington, and the greater Seattle area. The band consisted of: Tyler Lewis (vocals and guitar), Kyle Buckingham (bass), Danny Lewis (drums), and David Nichols (guitar and vocals). Bradley Pooler (guitar) would replace David Nichols in the lineup in 2003.

Time to Fly released their album Birth. Work. Death in 2002 (produced by Aaron Sprinkle) under RocketStar Recordings, which features twelve songs. After the release of the debut album, the band performed a number of shows to promote it, which caught the attention of locals around the Seattle area. The band's only album, Birth. Work. Death, revolves around the concept of a struggling working-class society, and focuses on the life and family of a working individual. The album's songs also focus on depression, greed, and breaking free of the hellish business world.

The songs, “You Will Not Communicate”, “Locked in and Hopelessly Fighting”, “Seemingly Grey”, "I Went Out to Colorado in 1972", “Things You Don’t Need to Know”, “Give Me Some Morphine, I’ll go”, and “Birth” were featured as music tracks in the snowboarding sports game Amped 3, an exclusive for Xbox 360 released in 2005.

After the first album, Time to Fly began to undergo changes, beginning with the replacement of David Nichols in the lineup for Bradley Pooler. With this new lineup, Time to Fly began working on new material. Only three songs surfaced publicly: "Sally Sheppard", "Devon Varmega", and "Good Art vs. Bad Art". The songs are recorded in a less polished manner, as the three tracks are intended to be demos. The three tracks are titled under the album name "Summer Demo Sessions" and were recorded in July 2003.

In the years after the band's initial release, the group went on hiatus. It wasn't until December 2012 that Time to Fly would yet again take the stage in performing their first album in its entirety, including the three tracks from the Summer Demo Sessions. The live performance at the Vera Project, on December 15, 2012, commemorated the ten-year anniversary of Birth. Work. Death. Time to Fly has not performed since, and there is no evidence of any musical continuation from the band.
