= Believer (Kutless album) =

Studio album by Kutless
- Released: February 28, 2012
- Studios: Fabmusic (Franklin, Tennessee): Blue Room (Portland, Oregon); Crossroads Studios (Vancouver, Washington)
- Genres: Christian rock, Christian alternative rock
- Length: 46:18
- Label: BEC
- Producers: David Garcia: Dave Lubben; Christopher Stevens

Kutless chronology
It Is Well (2009)	Believer (2012)	Glory (2014)

Singles from Believer
- 1. "Carry Me to the Cross" Released: 2012; 2. "Even If" Released: 2012

Believer is the seventh full-length studio album by the Christian rock band Kutless. It was released on February 28, 2012. The first single, "Carry Me to the Cross" has seen success on the Billboard Christian Songs chart with a peak at No. 15. The album debuted at No. 2 on Billboard's Hot Christian Albums chart and No. 42 on the Billboard 200. The album later peak at No. 1 on Hot Christian Albums and No. 36 on the 200 chart, becoming Kutless' highest position in the 200 so far.

This is the last album to feature long-time bassist Dave Luetkenhoelter and drummer Jeff Gilbert, who left the band in 2013 and 2012, respectively.

== Critical reception ==
Jesus Freak Hideout's

Professional ratings
Review scores
Source	Rating
About.com	4/5 stars
Allmusic	3/5 stars
Alpha Omega News	A
Alt Rock Live	9/10 stars
CCM Magazine	4/5 stars
Christian Broadcasting Network	5/5 spins
Christian Music Zine	5/5 stars
Christianity Today	4/5 stars
Cross Rhythms	8/10 squares
Indie Vision Music	3/5 stars
Jesus Freak Hideout (Nathaniel Schexnadyer) (Alex "Tincan" Caldwell)	3/5 stars
New Release Tuesday)	5/5 stars

About.com's Kim Jones said that the album "Bottom Line – our lives are a journey and since we know where our ultimate destination lies, the people and the events we find ourselves participating in during the trip take on more importance. Believer mimics that in that it is a journey, but the individual songs speak to different moments in our walks, giving some more weight than others today and then switching it up and highlighting others still tomorrow. Like Jesus meets us where we are at, the well-crafted songs on this album do the same."

Allmusic's Jon O'Brien said that the album "is still as thought-provoking as you'd expect it to be, but fans of their early work may be disappointed that Kutless now seem content to embrace their elder statesman of contemporary Christian rock status. "

Alpha Omega News' Rob Snyder said that the album is "Good work. This record should appeal to many."

Alt Rock Live's Jonathan Faulkner said that the album "takes facets and styles from each of previous records and mixes them together to make easily one of the most well crafted albums of the year."

CCM Magazine's Andy Argyrakis said that the album "blends gritty rockers, contemplative worship cuts, and piano-punctuated ballads."

Christian Broadcasting Network's Lisa Webber said "so often music tends to remain background noise. Believer is not one of those records. As cliché as it may sound, it compels you to make a difference in the world and to draw closer to God. The tempo of the music changes quite drastically between some of the songs, but the underlying tone never changes. Although their style is certainly not for everyone, this may be one of their best albums yet. It features several songs of a more rock style and several traditional Contemporary Christian music sounding tracks." Webber further noted "On most albums, one or two songs usually stand out above the rest. With Believer, there is no need to skip over songs to get to my favorites." Webber called the favorite tracks on the album are "Even If", "Carry On", "All Yours".

Christian Music Zine Emily Kjonaas said that the album "is by far their best work. Everyone who listens to it will be able to relate with several (or all) of these songs. This album encompasses a journey that all Christians resonate with and that is being human, and being a Believer."

Christianity Today's Andy Argyrakis stated the album "blends a more mature edition of the group's modern rock beginnings with more recent worship musings (though this batch is all originals), resulting in both gritty anthems and crisply-crafted, gradually intensifying ballads. Not every track ties up in a neat bow as the band grapples with topics like suffering and terminal illness, but they also remind listeners to raise their hands in praise no matter the season." The three songs the magazine called the "top tracks" are "Carry Me to the Cross", "If It Ends Today", "Even If the Healing Doesn't Come".

Cross Rhythms' John Willoughby said that "after their big selling but weak sounding 'Strong Tower' Kutless finally appear to be comfortable with the direction they have chosen."

Indie Vision Music's Sara Walz said that "their songs prove that they understand the power of words as well."

Jesus Freak Hideout's Nathaniel Schexnadyer wrote "I have mixed feelings about Kutless' latest record. On one hand, I'm disappointed that Kutless shows little or no imagination when they crafted their harder music, and they seem to be cementing their reputation as more of a radio pop rock/worship band than a thoughtful rock group with an alternative edge. On the other hand, Believer is a very balanced pop rock project that has all the necessary ingredients for a successful contemporary release. Although I would certainty prefer to spin previous Kutless albums first, Believer is honed almost perfectly for their target audience."

Jesus Freak Hideout's Alex "Tincan" Caldwell noted "while all the songs are sturdy and ready for the radio, few rise to "memorable" status. It's as if there were too many hands in the making of it, like a Hollywood blockbuster sequel. The pressure to produce a blockbuster album can be felt in almost every song, and while they deliver the goods mostly, there is a calculated feel to the whole undertaking".

New Release Tuesday's Kevin Davis said the album "is the band's crowning achievement featuring thirteen excellent rock worship songs. The album has a perfectly balanced mix of rockers and ballads and Jon Micah's vocals have never sounded better. This is their most complete overall album loaded with quality songs that all draw me closer to Christ. If you're looking for the best of Kutless, this is their top album surpassing all of their previous excellent work. For sure, Believer is among the top albums of the year."

== Track listing ==
CD track listing
No.	Title	Writer(s)	Length
1.	"If It Ends Today"	Nick De Partee, Dave Lubben	3:26
2.	"Carry On"	Jon Micah Sumrall, Lubben	3:42
3.	"All Yours"	De Partee, Lubben	3:36
4.	"Even If"	Scott Krippayne, Tony Wood	3:40
5.	"Hero"	Jason Walker, Christopher Steven Lockwood	3:30
6.	"Identity"	De Partee, Walker	3:16
7.	"Need"	De Partee, Lubben	3:33
8.	"Come Back Home"	Sam Mizell, Jeff Pardo	3:30
9.	"This Is Love"	Sumrall, Lubben	3:20
10.	"Gravity"	De Partee, Lubben	3:26
11.	"I'm With You"	Jeff Gilbert, De Partee, Sumrall, Lubben, Jon Maddux	3:47
12.	"Believer"	Sumrall	4:11
13.	"Carry Me to the Cross"	De Partee, Walker, Mark Stuart	3:30
Total length:			46:27

Deluxe edition additional tracks
No.	Title	Writer(s)	Length
14.	"Chance of a Lifetime"	De Partee, Garcia, David Luetkenhoelter, Stevens, Sumrall	3:12
15.	"Stand (The Way)"	De Partee, Lubben	6:11
16.	"Carry Me to the Cross" (Acoustic)	De Partee, Walker, Stuart	4:07

iTunes Pre-order bonus track
No.	Title	Length
17.	"Come Back Home" (Acoustic)	3:20

== Personnel ==
Kutless

- Jon Micah Sumrall – lead and backing vocals
- James Mead – lead guitars
- Nick De Partee – rhythm guitars
- Dave Luetkenhoelter – bass guitar
- Jeff Gilbert – drums, percussion, acoustic guitar (11)

Additional musicians

- Dave Lubben – keyboards (1–4, 7, 9–11), programming (1–4, 7, 9–11), guitars (1–4, 7, 9–11), percussion (1–4, 7, 9–11), backing vocals (1–4, 7, 9–11)
- David Garcia – keyboards (5, 6, 8, 12, 13), programming (5, 6, 8, 12, 13), guitars (5, 6, 8, 12, 13)
- Christopher Stevens – keyboards (5, 6, 8, 12, 13), programming (5, 6, 8, 12, 13), guitars (5, 6, 8, 12, 13), backing vocals (5, 6, 8, 12, 13)
- Jon Maddux – programming (11), backing vocals (11)
- Chris Lacorte – guitars (5, 6, 8, 12, 13)
- Brian Gocher – strings (3)
- Grant Diggles – strings (11)

Production

- Brandon Ebel – executive producer
- Tyson Paoletti – executive producer, A&R
- Dave Lubben – producer (1–4, 7, 9–11)
- David Garcia – producer (5, 6, 8, 12, 13)
- Christopher Stevens – producer (5, 6, 8, 12, 13)
- Dean Baskerville – additional engineer (1–4, 7, 9–11)
- Taylor Stevens – assistant engineer (5, 6, 8, 12, 13)
- Jon Maddux – additional engineer (11)
- J.R. McNeely – mixing
- Ted Jensen – mastering at Sterling Sound (New York, NY)
- Taylor Straton – A&R administration
- Kutless – art direction
- Zac Schwict – design
- Lee Steffan – photography
- Chris Edmiston – management

== Charts ==
Album

Chart (2011)	Peak position
US Billboard 200	36
US Billboard Alternative Albums	6
US Billboard Christian Albums	1
US Billboard Rock Albums	7
