= It Is Well (album) =

Studio album by Kutless
- Released: October 20, 2009
- Studio: Blue Rooms (Portland, Oregon): 24 (Brentwood, Tennessee); Townsend Studios (Franklin, Tennessee)
- Genre: Christian rock: soft rock; contemporary worship music
- Length: 44:06
- Label: BEC
- Producer: Brown Bannister; Dave Lubben; Kutless; Tyson Paoletti (executive)

Kutless chronology
To Know That You're Alive (2008)	It Is Well (2009)	Believer (2012)

Singles from It Is Well
- 1. "What Faith Can Do" Released: September 18, 2009; 2. "Everything I Need" Released: September 22, 2010

Professional ratings
Review scores
Source	Rating
AllMusic	4/5 stars

It Is Well: A Worship Album by Kutless, more commonly referred to as It Is Well, is the second worship album and sixth full-length album by the Christian rock band Kutless. It was released on October 20, 2009. The first single, "What Faith Can Do," has seen success on the Christian Adult Contemporary Chart, the Inspirational/Soft Rock Chart, and the Christian CHR (Pop) Chart. The album debuted at No. 2 on Billboard's Hot Christian Albums chart and No. 42 on the Billboard Top 200. Recently, they have released a music video for their hit song "What Faith Can Do." The song "What Faith Can Do" charted at No. 19 on the Billboard Bubbling Under Hot 100 Singles chart. Musically, the album deviates away from the hard rock sound on their previous albums and features a softer, calmer tone.

== Track listing ==
Album release
No.	Title	Writer(s)	Length
1.	"It Is Well"	Horatio Gates Spafford	4:03
2.	"Amazed"	Pete Kipley, Nick De Partee, Phil Wickham	3:42
3.	"Hungry"	Kathryn Scott	4:23
4.	"Taken by Love"	Dave Lubben, Jon Micah Sumrall	3:46
5.	"What Faith Can Do"	Scott Davis, Scott Krippayne	3:53
6.	"Remember Me"	Jon Howard, Nick De Partee	4:00
7.	"God of Wonders"	Marc Byrd, Steve Hindalong	3:06
8.	"Everything I Need"	Dave Lubben, Jon Micah Sumrall	3:01
9.	"Give Us Clean Hands"	Charlie Hall	4:18
10.	"You Save Me"	Pete Kipley, Nick De Partee, Phil Wickham	3:08
11.	"Redeemer"	Melody Green	3:17
12.	"I'm Still Yours"	Jon Howard, Nick De Partee	3:29
Total length:			44:06

The deluxe edition of It Is Well features three live versions of songs from the album, one acoustic version and one new song.

Deluxe edition
No.	Title	Writer(s)	Length
13.	"Beautiful the Blood"		3:40
14.	"Give Us Clean Hands" (live)	Charlie Hall	4:44
15.	"What Faith Can Do" (live)		3:57
16.	"Take Me In" (live)		4:27
17.	"Remember Me" (acoustic)		3:54

== Personnel ==
Kutless

- Jon Micah Sumrall – lead and backing vocals
- Nick De Partee – guitars, arrangements (1, 6, 10, 12)
- James Mead – guitars
- Dave Lutkenhoelter – bass, arrangements (1)
- Jeff Gilbert – drums

Additional musicians

- Dave Lubben – keyboards (1–4, 6–12), acoustic piano (1–4, 6–12), backing vocals (7)
- Matt Stanfield – keyboards (5)
- Brian Gocher – strings (1–4, 6–12)
- Westside Christian High School Choir (Lake Oswego, Oregon) – choir (1)
- Luke Brown – backing vocals (5)
- Patrick Tetreault – backing vocals (7)

Production

- Chance Hoag – executive producer, management
- Tyson Paoletti – executive producer
- Kutless – producers (1–4, 6–12), art direction
- Dave Lubben – producer (1–4, 6–12)
- Brown Bannister – producer (5), overdub engineer (5)
- Steve Bishir – recording (5)
- Bill Whittington – overdub engineer (5), additional editing (5)
- John Bannister – digital editing (5)
- F. Reid Shippen – mixing at Robot Lemon (Nashville, Tennessee) (1–4, 6–12)
- J.R. McNeely – mixing (5)
- Buckley Miller – mix assistant (1–4, 6–12)
- Troy Glessner – mastering at Spectre Studios (Tacoma, Washington)
- Meghann Street-Buswell – photography

== Awards ==
In 2010, the album was nominated for a Dove Award for Rock/Contemporary Album of the Year at the 41st GMA Dove Awards.
