= Hearts of the Innocent =

Studio album by Kutless
- Released: March 21, 2006
- Genre: Christian rock, alternative metal, hard rock
- Length: 44:05
- Label: BEC
- Producer: Aaron Sprinkle

Kutless chronology
| Strong Tower (2005) | Hearts of the Innocent (2006) | Live from Portland (2006) |

Professional ratings
Review scores
| Source | Rating |
|---|---|
| Allmusic | 4.5/5 stars |
| Christianity Today | 3/5 stars |
| Cross Rhythms | 8/10 stars |
| Jesus Freak Hideout | 3/5 stars |

Hearts of the Innocent is the fourth album released by the Christian rock band Kutless. A special edition of this album was also released. It included a DVD with all seven (at the time) of the band's music videos, as well as four bonus acoustic tracks added to the CD. The song "Shut Me Out" was once in the top 5 on ChristianRock.net, and "Somewhere in the Sky" was the 16th most requested song. This is their first record to feature bass player Dave Leutkenhoelter and drummer Jeff Gilbert. It is also the last studio album to feature original guitarist Ryan Shrout, though their live album Live from Portland was his last record of any kind released with the band. The album reached No. 45 on the Billboard 200 chart and No. 2 on the Billboard Top Christian Albums.

== Track listing ==
| No. | Title | Writer(s) | Length |
|---|---|---|---|
| 1. | "Hearts of the Innocent" | Aaron Sprinkle, Jon Micah Sumrall, Ryan Shrout | 3:37 |
| 2. | "Shut Me Out" | Sumrall, Ethan Luck | 3:29 |
| 3. | "Beyond the Surface" | Sprinkle, Sumrall, James Mead | 3:24 |
| 4. | "Smile" | Sprinkle, Sumrall | 4:24 |
| 5. | "Promise of a Lifetime" | Sprinkle, Sumrall | 4:03 |
| 6. | "Winds of Change" | Sprinkle, Sumrall | 4:20 |
| 7. | "Somewhere in the Sky" | Sumrall, Mead | 2:40 |
| 8. | "Mistakes" | Sprinkle, Sumrall | 3:52 |
| 9. | "Push Me Away" | Sprinkle, Sumrall | 3:21 |
| 10. | "Changing World" | Sprinkle, Sumrall | 3:53 |
| 11. | "Million Dollar Man" | Sumrall, Shrout | 2:56 |
| 12. | "Legacy" | Sprinkle, Sumrall, Luck | 3:44 |
| Total length: | | | 46:13 |

Special edition
| No. | Title | Writer(s) | Length |
|---|---|---|---|
| 13. | "Shut Me Out" (Acoustic) | Sumrall, Luck | 3:22 |
| 14. | "Smile" (Acoustic) | Sprinkle, Sumrall | 4:25 |
| 15. | "Somewhere in the Sky" (Acoustic) | Sumrall, Mead | 2:38 |
| 16. | "Changing World" (Acoustic) | Sprinkle, Sumrall | 3:52 |

== Singles ==
- "Shut Me Out"
- "Winds of Change"
- "Somewhere in the Sky"
- "Promise of a Lifetime"

== Music videos ==
- "Shut Me Out"
- "Somewhere in the Sky"

Two music videos have been released for the album thus far. The video for "Shut Me Out" was released in late 2005, and begins with a young boy wandering around a factory. Outside, a SWAT team arrives and storms the building. The band is seen playing inside. The first minute of the video makes it evident that the SWAT team is there to arrest the band for speaking the Word of God. At the chorus, lead singer Jon Micah Sumrall goes to the roof of the building, and yells the words of the chorus through a megaphone down to the policemen below. The SWAT team continues to fan out and look for the band members, who are shown at various times connecting wires and looking out of windows. The young boy keeps looking around the factory through most of the video. At the end, the band members rush to hook up a microphone before they are caught. The SWAT team breaks down the door, and the band is then seen being taken away in the SWAT van. After the song has ended and the van pulls away, the boy finds the microphone, and plugs it in. The screen then goes to black, and the words "Truth Message Sent" are typed across the top left corner of the screen.

The video for "Somewhere in the Sky" was released in late 2006. The video primarily consists of various shots of extreme sports; primarily surfing, windsurfing, skateboarding, and BMX biking. The band members are shown playing/singing one at a time during various shots, and they are foreground in black and white. The images are shown with various flashes of static over many of the shots. The song's meaning is displayed very well in the video, because lead singer Jon Micah Sumrall has said that he enjoys living for every single day, and he does that a lot with extreme sports. These words of his are shown in many lines throughout the song, primarily in the line, "This is a call to act and seize your day." The video was first released on the Christian rock music video compilation, "X 2007".

== Awards ==
In 2007, the album was nominated for two Dove Awards: Rock/Contemporary Album of the Year and Recorded Music Packaging of the Year, at the 38th GMA Dove Awards.

== Personnel ==
Kutless

- Jon Micah Sumrall – lead and backing vocals, acoustic piano (5)
- James Mead – lead guitars, backing vocals
- Ryan Shrout – rhythm guitars, backing vocals
- Dave Leutkenhoelter – bass guitar
- Jeff Gilbert – drums, percussion

Additional musicians

- Aaron Sprinkle – keyboards, programming, percussion, backing vocals (5), string arrangements (8)
- Matt Slocum – string arrangements (5)
- Phillip A. Peterson – cello (5, 8, 10), string arrangements (10)
- Sharyn Peterson – viola (5, 8, 10)
- JJ Jang – violin (5, 8, 10)
- Victoria Parker – violin (5, 8, 10)

Production

- Brandon Ebel – executive producer
- Kevin Sheppard – A&R
- Aaron Sprinkle – producer, recording
- Aaron Lipinski – recording
- J.R. McNeely – mixing
- Brian Gardner – mastering at Bernie Grundman Mastering, Hollywood, California
- Asterik Studio – art direction, design
- Jerad Knudson – photography
