= To Know That You're Alive =

Studio album by Kutless
- Released: June 24, 2008
- Genres: Hard rock; Christian rock; Christian metal; alternative metal
- Length: 40:51
- Label: BEC
- Producer: Pete Kipley

Kutless chronology
| Live from Portland (2006) | To Know That You're Alive (2008) | It Is Well (2009) |

Professional ratings
Review scores
| Source | Rating |
|---|---|
| About.com | 4.5/5 stars |
| Cross Rhythms | 8/10 stars |
| Jesus Freak Hideout | 2.5/5 stars |
| TuneLab Music | 9/10 stars |

To Know That You're Alive is the fifth full-length studio album by the Christian rock band Kutless. It was released on June 24, 2008. It is their first album to feature guitarist Nick DePartee, who took over the position after long-time member Ryan Shrout left the band in May 2007. The album debuted at No. 64 on the Billboard 200 album chart and stayed on the chart for six weeks. The album reached The Billboard Christian Albums chart peaking at No. 1, where it stayed for 27 weeks. The album's first rock single, "The Feeling", hit No. 11 on ChristianRock.net in its first week. The song was released as downloadable content for the Rock Band series.

== Track listing ==
| No. | Title | Writer(s) | Length |
|---|---|---|---|
| 1. | "The Feeling" | Kutless, Pete Kipley | 2:24 |
| 2. | "Sleeping City" (Instrumental) | De Partee | 1:10 |
| 3. | "To Know That You're Alive" | Kutless, Kipley | 3:15 |
| 4. | "The Disease & The Cure" | James Mead, Jon Micah Sumrall | 3:51 |
| 5. | "Complete" | Chris Taylor, Nick De Partee, Jeffrey Gilbert, Dave Luetkenhoelter, Sumrall, Kipley | 3:42 |
| 6. | "The Rescue" | Kutless, Kipley | 4:05 |
| 7. | "Promise You" | Kutless, Kipley | 3:34 |
| 8. | "Guiding Me Home" | De Partee, Sumrall, Steve Wilson | 3:05 |
| 9. | "Overcoming Me" | De Partee, Gilbert, Kipley, Luetkenhoelter, Sumrall | 2:59 |
| 10. | "I Do Not Belong" | De Partee, Kipley, Sumrall | 3:00 |
| 11. | "Loud" | De Partee, Kipley, Luetkenhoelter, Sumrall | 2:35 |
| 12. | "Dying to Become" | Kutless, Kipley | 3:57 |
| 13. | "You" | De Partee, Kipley, Sumrall | 3:14 |
| Total length: | | | 40:51 |

== Personnel ==
Kutless

- Jon Micah Sumrall – vocals
- Nick De Partee – lead guitars, backing vocals
- James Mead – rhythm guitars, backing vocals
- Dave Luetkenhoelter – bass guitar
- Jeffrey Gilbert – drums

Additional musicians

- Pete Kipley – string arrangements and conductor
- Nick Ingman – string arrangements (5)
- The London Session Orchestra – strings
- Pete Steward – backing vocals

Production

- Tyson Paoletti – executive producer, A&R
- Kevin Sheppard – A&R
- Pete Kipley – producer, engineer
- Steve Churchyard – engineer
- Buckley Miller – engineer, mix assistant
- Mike "X" O'Connor – engineer
- F. Reid Shippen – engineer, mixing at Sound Stage Studios (Nashville, Tennessee)
- Simon Rhodes – orchestra recording at Abbey Road Studios (London, UK)
- Troy Glessner – mastering at Spectre Studios (Tacoma, Washington)
- Geoff Barrios – drum technician
- Invisible Creature – art direction
- Don Clark – design
- Dave Hill – band photography
- Chance Hoag and Darren Tyler – management

== Music video ==
A music video was released for "To Know That You're Alive". It shows the band playing in a street where a car accident has taken a place. An ambulance comes and rushes a woman in the wreck to the hospital. Once there, it is shown that the woman is pregnant and clearly going into labor. The doctors rush to deliver the woman's baby. The video ends with the woman and the baby alive and together in the hospital room.

== Awards ==
The album was nominated for a Dove Award for Rock Album of the Year at the 40th GMA Dove Awards.
