= Seven Places =

American Christian rock band

- Origin: Medford, Oregon, United States
- Genres: Christian rock
- Years active: 1999–2005
- Label: BEC Recordings
- Past members: Abel Thomas; Tony Pallotta; Tyler Jones; Donnie Vizzini; Dave Luetkenhoelter; Jeffrey Gilbert

Seven Places was a Christian rock band founded in 2000. Seth Gilbert was the main songwriter and vocalist for Seven Places which was signed to BEC Recordings. The group amiably disbanded in 2005 to pursue other projects.

The band members were all originally from Medford, Oregon. "Our name is about the seven places Jesus Christ bled from to save us from our sins," vocalist Seth explains. "His hands cover the sinful things we've done with our hands. His feet cover the places of sin we've walked. His back covers all the times we've turned our back on Him, and His side, which is really from His heart, allows our hardened hearts to be softened. It is all about His blood and the fact that we're being covered by it at all points." Seth Gilbert currently works in the Music Ministry of Applegate Christian Fellowship in southern Oregon. Tony Pallotta became a music pastor at Mountain Christian Fellowship. Tyler Jones is married and lives in Portland, Oregon. Dave Luetkenhoelter and Jeffrey Gilbert joined Kutless, filling in the positions of bassist and drummer, respectively.

Seven Places disbanded shortly after the release of "Hear Us Say Jesus" in 2004, but a new 11-track album entitled "Glowing" was released on June 26, 2007, by BEC Recordings.

== Members ==
- Seth Gilbert - lead vocals, guitar (1999–2005)
- Jeffrey Gilbert - drums (1999–2005)
- Dave Luetkenhoelter - bass guitar (2004–2005)
- Tony Pallotta - guitar (2004–2005)
- Tyler Jones - guitar, vocal, keyboards (1999–2004)
- Donnie Vizzini - bass guitar (1999–2004)

== Discography ==
- Glowing - BEC Recordings (2007)
- Hear Us Say Jesus - BEC Recordings (2004)
- Lonely For The Last Time - BEC Recordings (2003)
- The White Noise EP - Independent (2003)
- Seven Places - Independent (2002)
- Lonely for the Last Time EP - Independent (2001)
- Free - Independent (2000)
