= The Send =

American alternative rock band

- Born: Joseph A. Kisselburgh
- Origin: Albany, Oregon, United States
- Genres: Alternative rock, Christian rock
- Years active: 2006–2008 (hiatus)
- Label: Tooth & Nail

The Send was an American alternative rock project of Falling Up ex-guitarist, Joseph A. Kisselburgh of Albany, Oregon, was signed to Tooth & Nail Records. His debut album, Cosmos, was released on July 31, 2007. Before this was even released, though, his song, "The Fall", was featured on Charlotte's Web: Music Inspired By The Motion Picture, a compilation album with music inspired by the 2006 movie of Charlotte's Web.In the summer of 2007, The Send performed alongside labelmate Hawk Nelson on a baseball park tour, playing at minor league ballparks across the United States. The first single off Cosmos was "An Epiphany," which quickly gained some success, reaching No. 5 on Christian Hit Radio.

TheSendOnline.com has links to record label Tooth & Nail, and management companies Third Coast Artists and Paradigm management. However, none of those sites have The Send listed on their active roster. In fact, the only site to have any information on the Send at all is toothandnail.com. The Send is on their "Archived Artists" page. However, on April 4, 2008, there was a post on The Send's official blog stating that the group is not done. Despite this, no other news concerning the project has been announced.

According to TheSendOnline.com, The Send has begun progress on their next album, which is planned for a 2011 release. The first word of the album's title is "Leaving".

On August 8, 2010, TheSendOnline.com domain expired without renewal, and the domain was purchased by an advertising company. There has been no activity on any of The Send's official pages Myspace since the post, and the last login for the Send Myspace was mid-2010. No word has been given as to whether or not The Send will continue its project, is on hiatus, or has completely disbanded.

== Discography ==
| Title | Year | Label | Peak Position - Top Christian Albums |
|---|---|---|---|
| Cosmos | 2007 | Tooth & Nail Records | No. 47 |

=== Singles ===
| Song | Year | Album | Peak Position - Top Christian Songs |
|---|---|---|---|
| "An Epiphany" | 2007 | Cosmos | No. 5 |
| "Need" | 2007 | Cosmos | |
