= Strong Tower =

Studio album by Kutless
- Released: March 1, 2005
- Studio: Compound Recording, Seattle, Washington
- Genre: Christian rock, alternative rock, contemporary worship music
- Length: 50:32
- Label: BEC
- Producer: Aaron Sprinkle

Kutless chronology
Sea of Faces (2004)	Strong Tower (2005)	Hearts of the Innocent (2006)

Professional ratings
Review scores
Source	Rating
AllMusic	3.5/5 stars
Christianity Today	1/5 stars
Cross Rhythms	3/10 stars
Jesus Freak Hideout	3/5 stars

Strong Tower is a worship album released by the Christian rock group Kutless and is also their third studio album. An enhanced deluxe edition of this album was released on March 20, 2007, with additional tracks and the "Strong Tower" live music video. The title track of this record, "Strong Tower", was once in the Top 5 on ChristianRock.net. The album peaked at No. 87 on the Billboard 200 and No. 4 on the Billboard Christian Albums. Five years later, in 2010, the album reached the Billboard Catalog Albums chart peaking at No. 39. The album was certified Gold by RIAA in 2009 and is Kutless's best-selling album to date. The official music video for "Strong Tower" came out on YouTube on February 27, 2009, and included lead singer Jon Micah Sumrall, guitarists James Mead and Nick DePartee, bassist Dave Luetkenhoelter and drummer Jeffrey Gilbert.

== Track listing ==
Album release
No.	Title	Writer(s)	Length
1.	"We Fall Down"	Chris Tomlin	3:09
2.	"Finding Who We Are"	Lee Shamburger	3:10
3.	"Take Me In"	Dave Browning	4:16
4.	"Ready For You"	Jon Micah Sumrall	4:14
5.	"Draw Me Close"	Kelly Carpenter	3:47
6.	"All Who Are Thirsty"	Brenton Brown, Glenn Robertson	4:13
7.	"Better Is One Day"	Matt Redman	4:50
8.	"All of the Words"	Jon Micah Sumrall, Kyle Mitchell, James Mead, Ryan Shrout, Aaron Sprinkle	3:46
9.	"Strong Tower"	Marc Byrd, Mark Lee, Jon Micah Sumrall, Aaron Sprinkle	3:58
10.	"Jesus Lord of Heaven"	Phil Wickham	3:21
11.	"I Lift My Eyes"	Brian Doerksen	3:32
12.	"Word of God Speak"	Bart Millard, Pete Kipley	3:47
13.	"Arms of Love"	Craig Musseau	3:56
Total length:			52:31

Deluxe edition
No.	Title	Length
14.	"We Exalt Thee"	3:19
15.	"My Savior and My God"	3:38
16.	"Strong Tower" (Live)	4:00

== Personnel ==
Kutless

- Jon Micah Sumrall – lead vocals, acoustic guitar
- James Mead – lead guitars, backing vocals
- Ryan Shrout – rhythm guitars, backing vocals
- Kyle Zeigler – bass guitar
- Kyle Mitchell – drums, percussion

Additional musicians

- Phil Peterson – cello on "Arms of Love" and "Strong Tower"
- Anne-Marie Hunsaker – backing vocals on "Arms of Love"

Production

- Brandon Ebel – executive producer and A&R
- Aaron Sprinkle – producer, engineer at Compound Recording (Seattle, Washington)
- Austin Thomason – assistant engineer
- Zach Hodges – additional engineering
- JR McNeely – mixing (1–4, 7, 8, 10) at Compound Recording (Seattle, Washington)
- Skidd Mills – mixing (5, 6, 9, 11–13) at Compound Recording (Seattle, Washington)
- Aaron Mlasko – drum technician
- Brian Gardner – mastering at Bernie Grundman Mastering (Hollywood, California)
- Asterik Studio – art direction and design
- David Stuart – photography

== Awards and certifications ==
The album was nominated for a Dove Award for Praise & Worship Album of the Year at the 37th GMA Dove Awards. The title song was also nominated for Worship Song of the Year.

Region	Certification	Certified units/sales
United States (RIAA)	Gold	500,000^{^}
^{^} Shipments figures based on certification alone.

This album was certified Gold selling more than 500,000 copies

== Music video ==
A video that consists of the band playing at night outside of the Lincoln Memorial courthouse building was released.
