= Sea of Faces =

Studio album by Kutless
- Released: February 24, 2004
- Studios: Compound Recording, Seattle, Washington
- Genres: Christian rock; post-grunge; hard rock; alternative metal; nu metal
- Length: 38:12
- Label: BEC
- Producer: Aaron Sprinkle

Kutless chronology
Kutless (2002)	Sea of Faces (2004)	Strong Tower (2005)

Singles from Sea of Faces
- 1. "Treason" Released: 2004; 2. "Sea of Faces" Released: 2004; 3. "Not What You See" Released: 2004; 4. "It's Like Me" Released: 2004

Professional ratings
Review scores
Source	Rating
Allmusic	4/5 stars
Christianity Today	3/5 stars
Cross Rhythms	9/10 stars
Jesus Freak Hideout	3/5 stars

Sea of Faces is the second full-length album released by Christian rock group Kutless, released through BEC Records in 2004. The song "Treason" was once the No. 1 song on ChristianRock.net, and Sea of Faces in the Top 5. The album reached No. 97 on the Billboard 200, the first time the band was on that chart, and No. 3 on the Billboard Top Christian Albums, the first top ten on this chart. "All of the Words" was featured in an episode of Scrubs titled "My Bright Idea". It is the first album to feature bassist Kyle Zeigler.

== Track listing ==
All tracks are written by Jon Micah Sumrall, Kyle Mitchell, James Mead, Ryan Shrout & Aaron Sprinkle.

Album release
No.	Title	Length
1.	"Not What You See"	2:57
2.	"All Alone"	3:48
3.	"Better for You"	3:25
4.	"Sea of Faces"	3:35
5.	"Let You In" (featuring Ryan Clark of Demon Hunter)	3:14
6.	"Passion"	3:05
7.	"Perspectives"	3:30
8.	"Treason"	3:24
9.	"All the Words"	3:47
10.	"Troubled Heart"	3:29
11.	"It's Like Me"	3:57
Total length:		38:11

== Personnel ==
Kutless

- Jon Micah Sumrall – lead and backing vocals
- James Mead – rhythm guitar
- Ryan Shrout – lead guitar
- Kyle Zeigler – bass guitar
- Kyle Mitchell – drums, percussion

Additional vocals

- Benjiman (on "Let You In")
- Ryan Clark (on "Let You In")

Production

- Brandon Ebel – executive producer
- Aaron Sprinkle – producer, engineer
- J.R. McNeely – mixing
- Brian Gardner – mastering at Bernie Grundman Mastering, Hollywood, California
- Zach Hodges – mastering assistant
- Aaron Mlasko – drum technician
- Asterik Studio – art direction, design
- Kris McCaddon – photography

== Music videos ==
Year	Title	Source
2004	"Not What You See"	YouTube Go
2004	"Sea of Faces"	YouTube Go

The video of "Not What You See" consists of the band playing on a stage in a white room. Powder is on the stage which adds to the visual of the band jumping up and down. The video appears to be in black and white but actually has some color to it.

The video of "Sea of Faces" shows the band playing in a dark room much like their video for "Run". It also shows Jon Micah Sumrall walking along the streets along with many other different people.

== Awards ==
On 2005, the album was nominated for a Dove Award for Rock Album of the Year at the 36th GMA Dove Awards.
