= Kutless =

American rock band

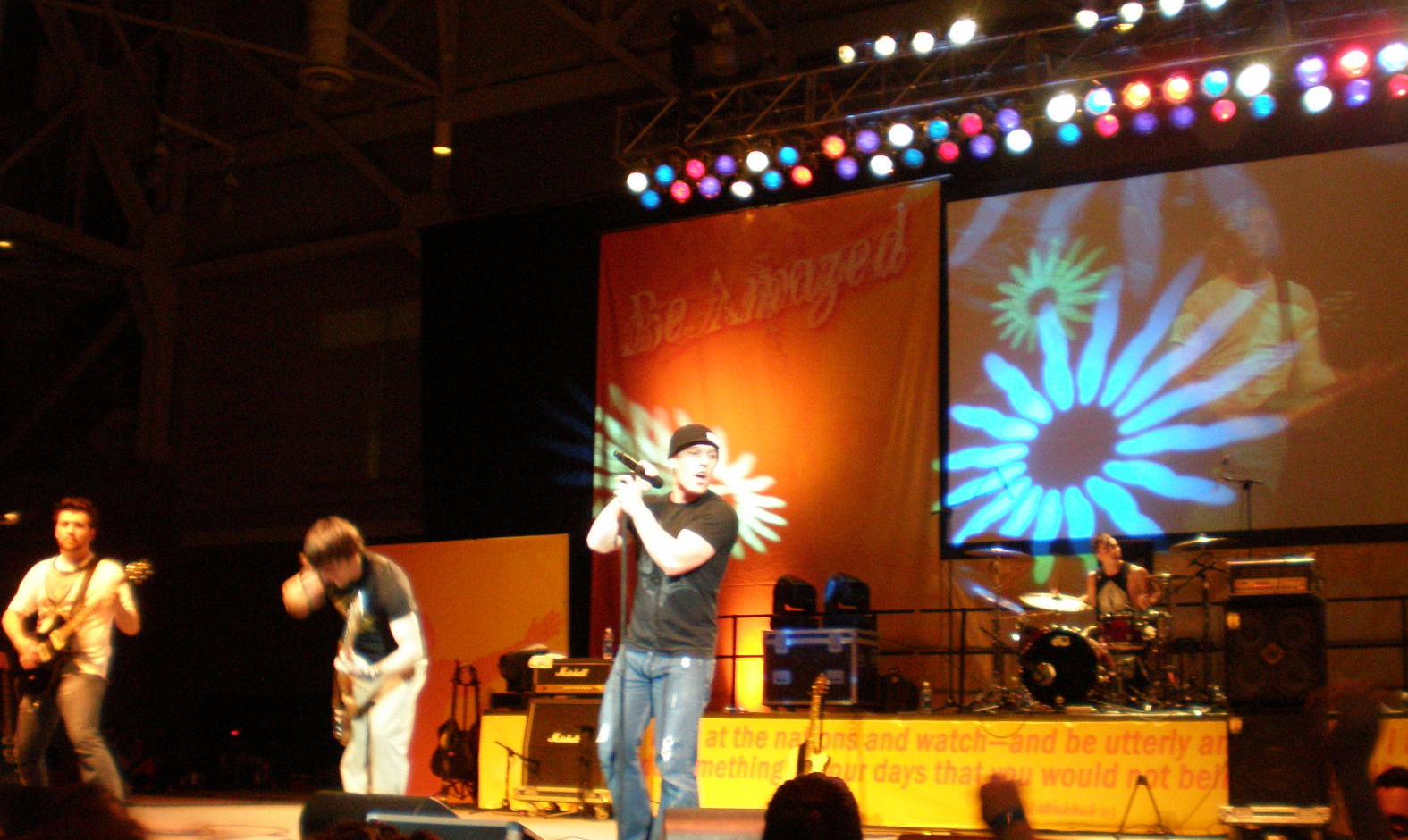
- Kutless in concert in 2007

Background information
- Also known as: Call Box
- Origin: Portland, Oregon, U.S.
- Genres: Alternative rock; Christian rock
- Years active: 1999–present
- Label: BEC
- Members: Jon Micah Sumrall; Neal Cameron; Matt Christopherson
- Past members: Andrew Morrison; Nathan "Stu" Stuart; Kyle Zeigler; Kyle Mitchell; Ryan Shrout; Jeff Gilbert; Dave Luetkenhoelter; Kyle Peek; Nick DePartee; Vince DiCarlo; Drew Porter; James Mead; Nathan Parrish
- Website: www.kutless.com

Kutless is an American Christian rock band from Portland, Oregon, formed in 1999. Since their formation, they have released multiple studio albums and one live album, Live from Portland. They have sold over 3 million records worldwide.

== History ==
=== Earlier years (1999–2000) ===
The band was formed in Portland, Oregon, as a campus worship band named "Call Box". They performed during the 1999–2000 school year at Warner Pacific College. Their first guitarist, Andrew Morrison, decided to leave the band shortly before they signed with BEC records. James Mead replaced Morrison at lead guitar. The Band changed their name to "Kutless" in October 2001, before releasing their first three-track EP followed up by their full-length album in 2002 on BEC Recordings. Kutless chose their name because of a Bible verse. Romans 6:23 says, "For the wages of sin is death, but the free gift of God is eternal life in Christ Jesus our Lord" (NRSV). Because of this, the band says, "He took our cuts for us... leaving us 'Kutless'."

=== Early releases (2002–2007) ===
Kutless' first two singles from their self-titled debut album were "Your Touch" and "Run". The latter would hold the record for the longest-charting song in the history of the R&R Top 40 charts.

Kutless had their touring debut between February and April 2003 when they opened up for Audio Adrenaline and MercyMe.

In 2004, Kutless released their second full-length album Sea of Faces. The album peaked at No. 97 on the Billboard 200 chart. After selling over 250,000 copies, Kutless went on their first headlining tour, X 2004. That year, Kutless was scheduled to perform at the 2004 Summer Olympics in Greece but could not make it because the airline canceled their flight.

In 2005, Kutless played a Katrina Benefit Relief Concert in Portland, Oregon. They also released their first worship album, Strong Tower that peaked at No. 87 on the Billboard 200 albums chart. After recording but before release of Strong Tower, bassist Kyle Zeigler and drummer Kyle Mitchell left the band to form Verbatim Records, a nationally distributed record label based in the Portland, Oregon area. They were replaced with bassist Dave Luetkenhoelter and drummer Jeff Gilbert, who both came from the recently broken-up Christian rock band Seven Places. Kutless also went on the Strong Tower tour that year.

The fourth album, Hearts of the Innocent, was released on March 21, 2006, peaking at No. 45 on the Billboard 200 Albums chart. The band followed up with a tour, also featuring Stellar Kart, Disciple, and Falling Up.

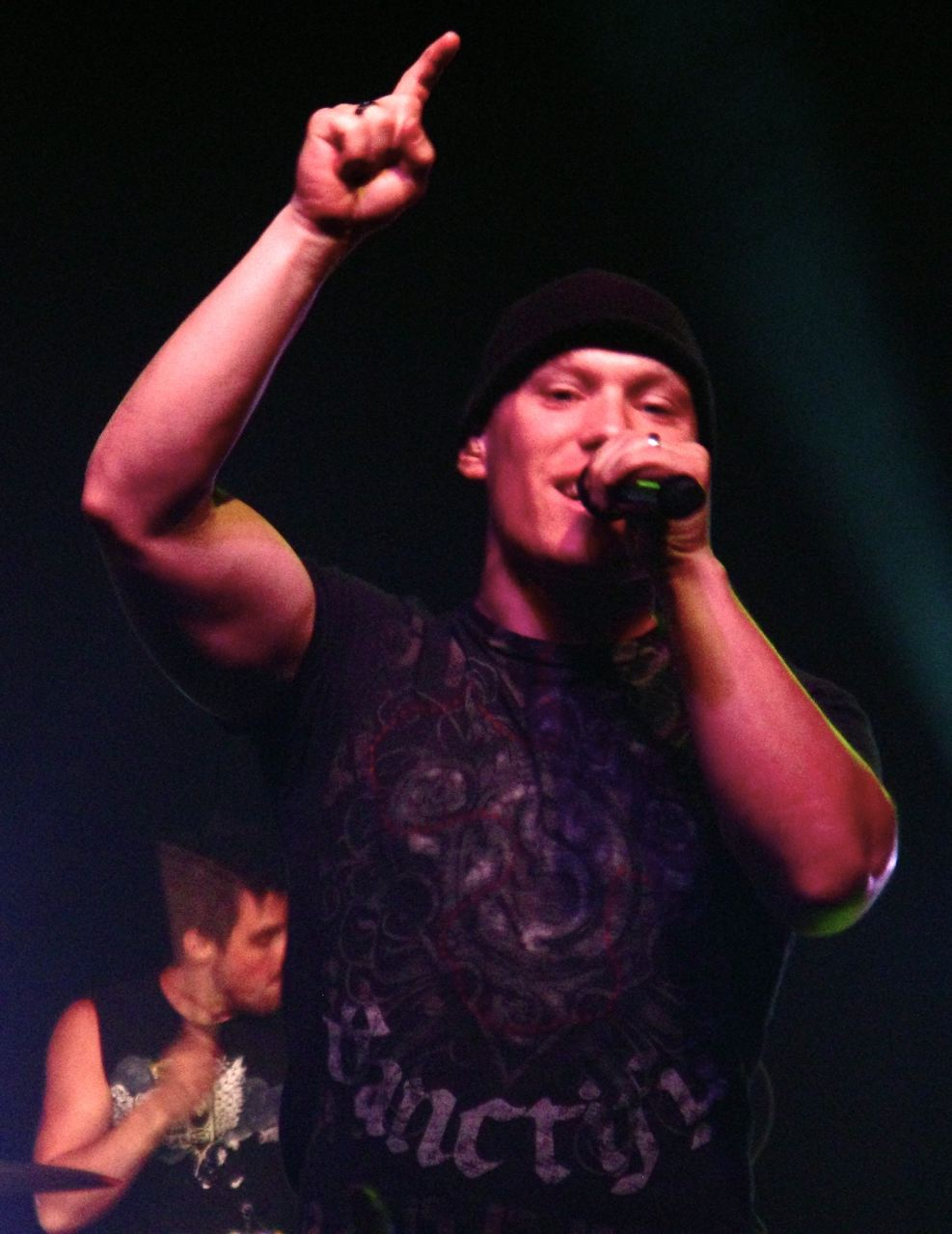
Jon Micah Sumrall, lead vocalist

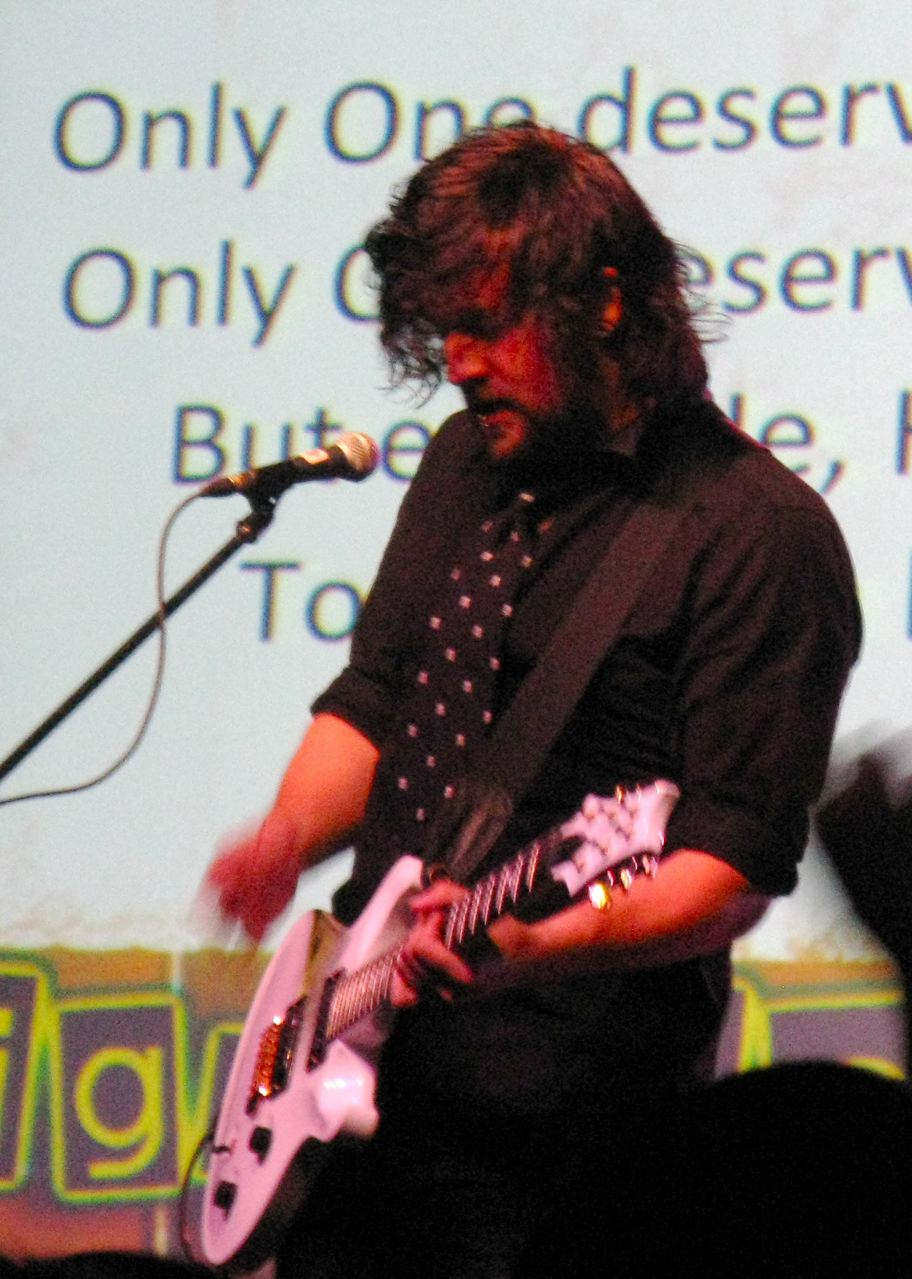
James Mead, guitarist and backing vocalist

In May 2007, longtime Kutless guitarist Ryan Shrout decided to leave Kutless, after his daughter was diagnosed with a rare eye disease. Shrout chose to support his family during this time and left Kutless to do so. Nick DePartee, who had been a guitar tech for the band, took Shrout's spot. This left Jon Micah Sumrall as the only remaining original member, although James Mead had joined before the first album.

The band's songs "Hearts of the Innocent" and "Beyond the Surface" are playable songs on the Christian Guitar Hero game called Guitar Praise. Their songs "Shut Me Out" and "Your Touch" were later featured in Guitar Praise's Expansion Pack 1. Their song "The Feeling" appears on the video game Rock Band 2 as an extra downloadable song. "Strong Tower" was added in 2011.

=== Later releases (2008–present) ===
In 2008, Kutless released their fifth album To Know That You're Alive. The album peaked at No. 64 on the Billboard 200 album chart and reached No. 1 on the Billboard Christian Albums chart.

The band made a headline appearance at the "Ultimate Event" Christian concert at Alton Towers in the United Kingdom during May 2009. It was their debut UK appearance.

In 2009, the band released another worship album, It Is Well. It was co-produced by Dave Lubben. The single "What Faith Can Do" was No. 1 for two months on the Billboard Christian songs chart and was the No. 2 overall ranked Christian song on Billboard's year end analysis.

They toured with Casting Crowns on the spring leg of the Until The Whole World Hears Tour, and then headlined the It Is Well Tour with Chasen and The Museum. On the fall leg of the tour, they toured with Sidewalk Prophets and Above The Golden State. The band then toured on Winter Jam 2011, alongside Newsboys, David Crowder Band, RED, KJ-52, and others.

Kutless released their seventh album Believer on February 28, 2012. It debuted at No. 36 on the Billboard 200 chart and debuted at No. 1 on the Billboard Christian Albums chart for the week of March 17, 2012. The album's first single, "Carry Me to the Cross", peaked at No. 8 on Billboard's Christian Songs chart.

In 2012, drummer Jeff Gilbert left the band and was replaced by Kyle Peek, who had been the drummer for American Idol Season 7 winner David Cook's band.

Kutless embarked on the first leg of the Believer Tour, partnering with Compassion International later in 2012. The tour went to over 20 cities across the U.S. and included Fireflight, Rhett Walker Band, Hyland, and Justin McRoberts. In December 2012 Kutless teamed up with Nick Hall to headline Pulse's Christmas tour, The Reason.

In May 2013 Kutless posted on social media that bassist Dave Luetkenhoelter had decided to leave the band. Their former merchandise manager Neal Cameron became the new bass player of Kutless in April 2014.

Kutless released Glory, their eighth full-length album, on BEC Recordings in February 2014. As of July 2014 the album has released three singles "You Alone", "Always" and "Never Too Late".

From March 2014 to May 2014, Kutless shared the Change a Life Your with Audio Adrenaline, immediately following this tour the band made it public that drummer Kyle Peek would be leaving the band to spend more time with his family and to explore worship leading at the band's home church in Portland. A few months after, long time guitarist Nick DePartee also left the band to go in a new direction, in his family life, artistically and in music. They were replaced by Vince DiCarlo and Drew Porter on guitar and drums, respectively.

A new single, "Bring It On", was to be sent to Christian AC radio on October 6, 2015.

In 2015, Vince DiCarlo left the band, and was replaced by Nathan Parrish on guitar.

In 2018, Drew Porter was replaced by Matt Christopherson as their new drummer.

In July 2022, to commemorate the 20th anniversary of their debut album, the band released an EP called TWENTY, featuring re-imagined songs from their self-titled album. On September 30 of that year, Kutless released a single, "Words of Fire", which showed a return to their hard rock roots. On December 2, 2022, the band released a second single, "End of the World", collaborating with Disciple. The band released their third single, "Midnight", on May 1, 2025. The band released their fourth single, "Lies Of My Brothers", on May 29, 2025, announcing the release of a new EP, The Seventh Seal, which was released on June 27th, 2025.

In late July of 2025, guitarist James Mead was hospitalized after suffering a stroke. James announced on September 14, 2026 that he will no longer be a part of the band moving forward.

== Members ==
=== Current members ===
- Jon Micah Sumrall – lead vocals (1999–present)
- Neal Cameron – bass guitar (2013–present)
- Matt Christopherson – drums (2018–present)

=== Former members ===
- Andrew Morrison – lead and rhythm guitars (1999–2000)
- Nathan "Stu" Stuart – bass guitar (1999–2002)
- James Mead – rhythm guitar, backing vocals (2001–2026)
- Kyle Zeigler – bass guitar (2002–2005)
- Kyle Mitchell – drums (1999–2005)
- Ryan Shrout – lead guitar, backing vocals (2000–2007)
- Jeff Gilbert (formerly of Seven Places) – drums (2005–2012)
- Dave Luetkenhoelter (formerly of Seven Places) – bass guitar (2005–2013)
- Kyle Peek – drums, backing vocals (2012–2014)
- Nick DePartee – lead guitar, backing vocals (2007–2014)
- Vince DiCarlo – lead guitar, backing vocals (2014–2015)
- Drew Porter (formerly of Showbread) – drums (2014–2018)
- Nathan Parrish – lead guitar (2015–2026)

== Discography ==
- Kutless (2002)
- Sea of Faces (2004)
- Strong Tower (2005)
- Hearts of the Innocent (2006)
- Live from Portland (2007)
- To Know That You're Alive (2008)
- It Is Well (2009)
- Believer (2012)
- Glory (2014)
- Surrender (2015)
- Alpha / Omega (2017)

== EPs ==
- Twenty EP (July 20, 2022)
- This Is Christmas (October 4, 2011)
- The Seventh Seal (June 27, 2025)

== Awards ==
=== GMA Dove Awards ===
Year	Award	Result
2006	Group of the Year	Nominated
2006	Praise & Worship Album of the Year (Strong Tower)	Nominated
2006	Worship Song of the Year ("Strong Tower")	Nominated
2007	Rock/Contemporary Album of the Year (Hearts of the Innocent)	Nominated
2007	Recorded Music Packaging of the Year (Hearts of the Innocent)	Nominated
2008	Long Form Music Video of the Year (Live from Portland)	Nominated
2009	Rock Album of the Year (To Know That You're Alive)	Nominated
2010	Rock/Contemporary Album of the Year (It Is Well)	Nominated
2016	Rock/Contemporary Album of the Year (Surrender)	Nominated

=== We Love Awards ===
Year	Award	Result
2025	Rock / Alternative Song of the Year ("Words of Fire")	Won
