= Jon Micah Sumrall =

American musical performer and lead vocalist (b. 1980)

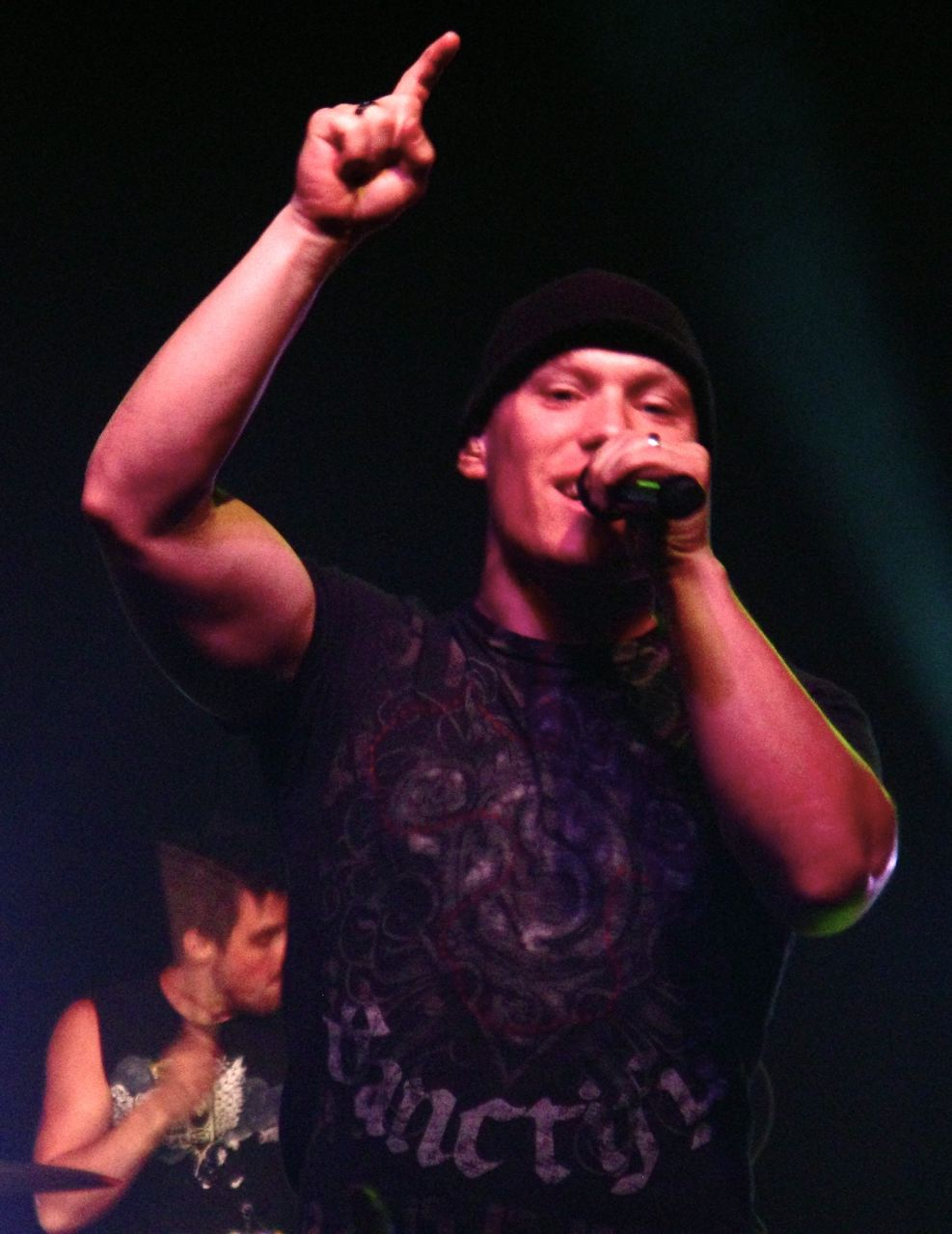
- Sumrall performing with Kutless in 2008

Background information
- Born: Jon Micah Sumrall; October 13, 1980 (age 46); Ashland, Oregon
- Origin: West Linn, Oregon
- Genres: Contemporary Christian Music, Christian Rock, Christian Metal, Post-Grunge, Alternative Rock, Alternative Metal, Hard rock, Nu Metal,
- Instruments: Vocals, guitar, piano
- Years active: 1999–present
- Label: BEC
- Member of: Kutless

Jon Micah Sumrall (born October 13, 1980) is an American musician and the lead vocalist of the Christian rock band Kutless. He occasionally plays acoustic guitar and piano for the band as well. Sumrall has been a member of Kutless since he started the band with James Mead and Ryan Shrout in 2001. It began as the worship band, Call Box, while Sumrall was still in college. He released Faith & Family, with BEC Recordings, in 2015. He is the band's only remaining original member and, alongside rhythm guitarist James Mead, the only member to appear on every album.

== Early life ==
Sumrall grew up in a Christian home. He says: "My dad was one of the pastors at Applegate Christian Fellowship and my whole family was very involved with the church on a daily basis. It grew to be a very large church of nearly 7,000 people and I found myself even at a very young age in a bit of the spotlight. By the time I was 12 years old, I was involved in leading worship as well as helping with some of the younger Sunday school groups. I feel like being on stage has been a part of my entire life but little did I know then how these experiences would play into my life."

== Music history ==
He has been the lead vocalist for the Christian rock band Kutless, since its inception in 1999. Sumrall's individual musical recording career commenced in 2015, with the album, Faith & Family, and it was released by BEC Recordings on February 24, 2015.

== Personal life ==
Sumrall currently lives in Idaho, with his wife and two kids.

When he has time off the road, he enjoys snowboarding and skiing off high jumps and gets to be an adrenaline junkie. He loves to listen to nature such as a waterfall or the rustling of leaves. During Jon's life, he has had several surgeries for broken bones, dislocations, and sprains.

== Discography ==
Studio albums

- Faith & Family (February 24, 2015, BEC)
