= Hawk Nelson discography =

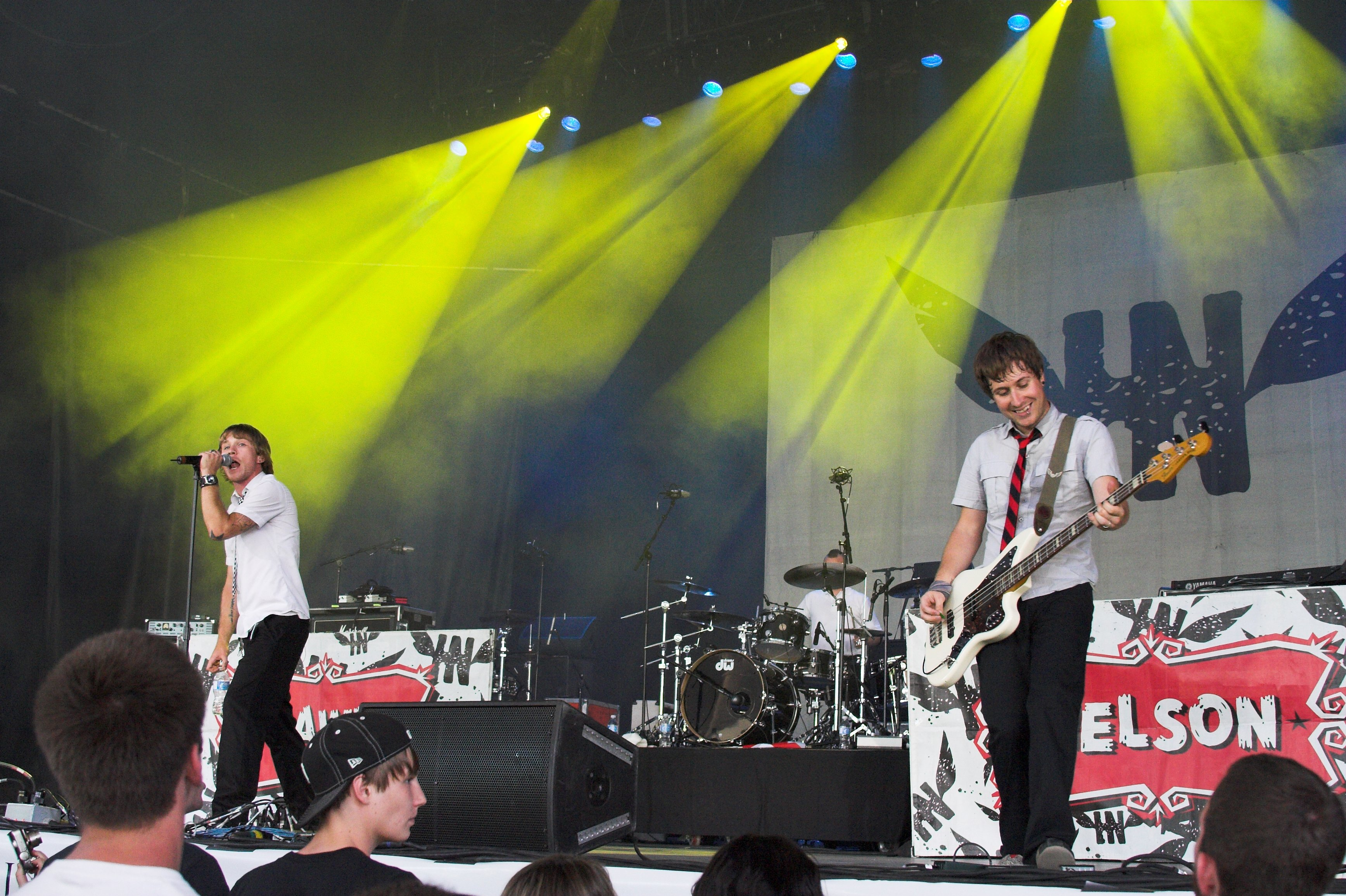
- Hawk Nelson performing at Wonder Jam 2009 at Canada's Wonderland, in Vaughan, Ontario, Canada
- Studio albums: 10
- Extended plays: 8
- Compilation albums: 2
- Singles: 21
- Music videos: 12

The following is a comprehensive discography of Hawk Nelson, a Canadian rock band. The band has released ten studio albums.

== Albums ==
=== Studio albums ===
Title	Details	Peak chart positions				Sales	Certifications (sales threshold)
Title	Details	US	US Christ	US Rock	US Alt	Sales	Certifications (sales threshold)
Riding Around the Park (as SWISH)	Released: November 30, 2000; Label: Independent; Format: CD	—	—	—	—		
Saturday Rock Action (as SWISH)	Released: May 1, 2003; Label: Independent; Format: CD	—	—	—	—		
Letters to the President	Released: July 13, 2004; Label: Tooth & Nail Records; Format: CD, DL	—	35	—	—		
Smile, It's the End of the World	Released: April 4, 2006; Label: Tooth & Nail/BEC Recordings; Format: CD, DL	75	3	24	—	US: 14,000	
..Is My Friend!	Released: April 1, 2008; Label: BEC; Format: CD, DL	34	1	13	10	US: 30,000	
LIVE*LIFE*LOUD	Released: September 22, 2009; Label: BEC; Format: CD, DL	54	2	21	12		
Crazy Love	Released: February 8, 2011; Label: BEC; Format: CD, DL	87	3	21	12		
Made	Released: April 2, 2013; Label: Fair Trade Services; Format: CD, DL	192	15	—	—		
Diamonds	Released: March 17, 2015; Label: Fair Trade; Format: CD, DL	—	12	—	—		
Miracles	Released: April 6, 2018; Label: Fair Trade; Format: CD, DL	—	—	—	—		
"—" denotes a release that did not chart.

=== Other albums ===
Title	Details	Peak chart positions				Sales	Certifications (sales threshold)
Title	Details	US	US Christ	US Rock	US Alt	Sales	Certifications (sales threshold)
The Sons You've Already Heard: The Best of Hawk Nelson	Released: March 27, 2012; Label: BEC Recordings; Format: CD, DL	—	—	—	—		
Hawkology: The Anthology of Hawk Nelson	Released: June 8, 2010; Label: BEC; Format: CD, DL	—	—	—	—		
The Light Sides	Released: February 8, 2011; Label: Tooth & Nail Records; Format: CD, DL	—	—	—	—		
"—" denotes a release that did not chart.

== Extended plays ==
Title	Details	Peak chart positions				Sales	Certifications (sales threshold)
Title	Details	US	US Christ	US Rock	US Alt	Sales	Certifications (sales threshold)
Saturday Rock Action (as SWISH)	Released: May 1, 2003; Label: Independent; Format: CD	—	—	—	—		
California	Released: February 28, 2004; Label: Tooth & Nail Records; Format: CD, DL	—	—	—	—		
Bring 'Em Out	Released: December 20, 2005; Label: Tooth & Nail Records; Format: CD, DL	—	—	—	—		
Gloria	Released: November 21, 2006; Label: BEC Recordings; Format: CD, DL	—	—	—	—		
Let's Dance: The Remixes	Released: December 2008; Label: BEC; Format: CD, DL	—	—	—	—		
Summer	Released: June 16, 2009; Label: BEC; Format: CD, DL	—	—	—	—		
Christmas	Released: November 1, 2011; Label: BEC; Format: CD, DL	—	—	—	—		
"—" denotes a release that did not chart.

== Singles ==
Title	Year	Peak chart positions						Certifications (sales threshold)	Album
Title	Year	US Christ	US Christ Air	US Christ AC	US Christ Digital	US Christ CHR	US Christ Rock	Certifications (sales threshold)	Album
"Every Little Thing"	2004	—	—	—	—	20	3		Letters to the President
"Letters To the President"	2004	—	—	—	—	—	2		Letters to the President
"Things We Go Through"	2004	—	—	—	—	20	4		Letters to the President
"Take Me"	2004	—	—	—	—	10	11		Letters to the President
"Everything You Ever Wanted"	2006	14		—	—	1	5		Smile, It's the End of the World
"The Show"	2006	20		—	—	9	1		Smile, It's the End of the World
"Zero"	2006	17		—	—	4	2		Smile, It's the End of the World
"Friend Like That"	2007	19		—	—	2	7		...Is My Friend!
"You Have What I Need"	2008	—		—	—	—	4		...Is My Friend!
"One Little Miracle"	2008	24		—	—	5	—		...Is My Friend!
"Let's Dance"	2008	— (Note: "Let's Dance" did not enter the Billboard Hot Christian Songs, but peaked at No. 17 on the Mediabase Christian Rock Recurrent)		—	—	5	1		...Is My Friend!
"Live Life Loud"	2009	50		—	—	—	—		LIVE*LIFE*LOUD
"Meaning of Life"	2009	37		—	—	5	—		LIVE*LIFE*LOUD
"Alive"	2009	— (Note: "Alive" did not enter the Billboard Hot Christian Songs, but peaked at No. 8 on the Mediabase Christian Rock National Airplay and No. 15 on the Christian Rock Recurrent)		—	—	—	—		LIVE*LIFE*LOUD
"Crazy Love"	2010	22		—	23	8	—		Crazy Love
"Skeleton"	2010	—		—	—	—	—		Crazy Love
"Your Love Is a Mystery"	2011	43		—	—	9	—		Crazy Love
"Words" (with Bart Millard of MercyMe)	2012	2		3	5	—	—		Made
"Faithful"	2013	34	27	— (Note: "Faithful" did not enter the Christian AC Songs chart, but peaked at No. 21 on the Christian AC Indicator.)	—	—	—		Made
"A Million Miles Away"	2014	14	28	— (Note: "A Million Miles Away" did not enter the Christian AC Songs chart, but peaked at No. 28 on the Christian AC Indicator.)	—	—	—		Made
"Just Getting Started"	2014	—	—	—	—	—	—		Diamonds
"Drops in the Ocean"	2015	5	2	3	6	—	—		Diamonds
"The Great Unknown"	2015	—	—	—	—	—	—		Diamonds (Deluxe edition)
"Sold Out"	2015	—	—	—	—	—	—		Diamonds
"Diamonds"	2016	8	4	8	14	—	—		Diamonds
"Live Like You're Loved"	2017	15	18	17	19	—	—		Diamonds
"He Still Does (Miracles)"	2017	22	16	14	—	—	—		Miracles
"Never Let You Down" (with Hunter and Tara)	2018	42	23	—	—	—	—		Miracles
"Right Here With You" (with MDSN)	2018	—	—	—	—	—	—		Miracles
"Parachute"	2018	—	37	— (Note: "Parachute" did not enter the Christian AC Songs chart, but peaked at No. 25 on the Christian AC Indicator.)	—	—	—		Miracles
"Never Runs Dry"	2019	—	—	39	—	—	—		Miracles
"—" denotes a recording that did not chart or was not released in that territory.

=== Other charted songs ===
Title	Year	Peak chart positions		Certifications (sales threshold)	Album
Title	Year	US Christ	US Christ Air	Certifications (sales threshold)	Album
"I Heard the Bells"	2010	25			Christmas
"One Shot"	2012	— (Note: "One Shot" did not enter the Billboard Hot Christian Songs, but peaked at No. 19 on the Mediabase Christian Rock National Airplay and No. 4 on the Christian Rock Recurrent)			Crazy Love
"—" denotes a recording that did not chart or was not released in that territory.

== Compilation appearances ==
Year	Album	Song(s)	Label
2005	X 2005	"California"	BEC Recordings
2006	X 2006	"The One Thing I Have Left"	BEC Recordings
2006	27th Annual Covenant Hits	"Every Little Thing"	CMC Distribution
2006	WOW Hits 2007	"Everything You Ever Wanted"	EMI Music Group
2007	X 2007	"Is Forever Enough"	BEC Recordings
2007	X Worship	"Everything You Ever Wanted"	BEC Recordings
2007	Charlotte's Web	"Everything You Ever Wanted"	Sony Classical
2008	GMA Canada presents 30th Anniversary Collection	"Every Little Thing"	CMC Distribution
2008	The Ultimate Collection: Tooth & Nail Records	"The One Thing I Have Left"	Tooth & Nail Records
2008	X 2008	"The Show"	Tooth and Nail
2008	JCPenney Presents: Don't You Forget About Me (The Covers) EP	"Don't You (Forget About Me)"	EMI America Records
2008	Canada Rocks	"Friend Like That"	CMC Distribution
2008	WOW Hits 2009	"Friend Like That"	Word Entertainment
2008	X Christmas	"Gloria"	BEC Recordings
2009	X 2009	"Friend Like That"	BEC Recordings
2009	Sea to Sea: Christmas	"Alleluia"	Lakeside Media
2009	WOW Hits 2010	"Meaning of Life"	Word Entertainment
2010	Acoustic Playlist: Medium	"One Little Miracle" (featuring Amy Grant)	Starsong / EMD
2010	Rock What You Got	"Friend Like That"	Starsong / EMD
2010	Christian Radio No. 1 Hits	"Everything You Ever Wanted"	Starsong / EMD
2010	WOW Hits 2011: Deluxe Edition	"Live Life Loud (The Uprok Remix)"	
2011	WOW #1s: Yellow	"Everything You Ever Wanted"	Word Distribution
2014	WOW Hits 2015: Deluxe Edition	"Words (featuring Bart Millard)"	Capitol CMG
2015	WOW Hits 2016	"Drops In The Ocean"	Capitol CMG
2016	WOW Hits 2017	"Diamonds"	Capitol CMG

== Music videos ==
List of music videos, showing year released and director
Title	Year	Albums	Reference
"California"	2004	Letters to the President	
"Every Little Thing"	2004	Letters to the President	
"From Underneath"	2004	Letters to the President	
"Letters to the President"	2005	Letters to the President	
"Bring 'Em Out" (Live) (feat. Drake Bell)	2005	Soundtrack: Yours, Mine and Ours	
"The One Thing I Have Left"	2006	Smile, It's the End of the World	
"Zero"	2007	Smile, It's the End of the World	
"Friend Like That"	2008	Hawk Nelson Is My Friend	
"Live Life Loud"	2009	Live Life Loud	
"Shaken"	2010	Live Life Loud	
"Crazy Love"	2011	Crazy Love	
"Words" (feat. Bart Millard)	2013	Made	
"Diamonds"	2016	Diamonds	
"Never Let You Down" (feat. Hunter and Tara)	2018	Miracles	
"Right Here With You" (feat. MDSN)	2018	Miracles	
"Parachute"	2018	Miracles	
