= Crazy Love (Hawk Nelson album) =

Studio album by Hawk Nelson
- Released: February 8, 2011
- Recorded: 2010–2011
- Studios: The Holiday Ian and Emack Studios (Franklin, Tennessee); Legion of Boom Studio (Nashville, Tennessee)
- Genres: Christian rock, pop punk, punk rock
- Length: 34:52
- Label: BEC
- Producer: Ian Eskelin: Steve Wilson (Disc 2)

Hawk Nelson chronology
| Live Life Loud (2009) | Crazy Love (2011) | Made (2013) |

Crazy Love is the fifth studio album from Canadian Christian rock band Hawk Nelson. It was released on February 8, 2011. It is the last album with lead vocalist Jason Dunn, who left the band in 2012 to pursue a solo career. The album netted a nomination for Best Contemporary Christian/Gospel Album at the Juno Awards of 2012.

== Concept and musical style ==
At live shows in 2010, the band claimed that Crazy Love will be very fast, and much more of a throwback to their first album Letters to the President. Guitarist Jon Steingard claims on his blog that it's "the most high-energy Hawk Nelson record ever. I'd even cautiously say it's more high-energy than our first album, Letters to the President."

== Track listing ==
Crazy Love track listing
| No. | Title | Writer(s) | Length |
|---|---|---|---|
| 1. | "Tally-Ho" | Hawk Nelson, Steve Wilson | 1:39 |
| 2. | "Your Love Is a Mystery" | Hawk Nelson | 3:11 |
| 3. | "Crazy Love" | Ian Eskelin, Hawk Nelson, Tony Wood | 3:41 |
| 4. | "My Next Breath" | Jason Ingram, Hawk Nelson | 3:30 |
| 5. | "We're Alright" | Hawk Nelson, Wilson | 3:03 |
| 6. | "Skeleton" | Hawk Nelson, Wilson | 2:50 |
| 7. | "We Can Change the World" | Eskelin, Hawk Nelson | 3:20 |
| 8. | "One Shot" | Ben Glover, Hawk Nelson | 3:21 |
| 9. | "Fraud" | Hawk Nelson, Wilson | 2:45 |
| 10. | "Joanna" | Hawk Nelson, Wilson | 2:58 |
| 11. | "LAX" | Hawk Nelson, Wilson | 0:57 |
| 12. | "Done Holding On" | Hawk Nelson, Wilson | 3:34 |
| 13. | "Thanks for the Beautiful Memories" | Hawk Nelson, Wilson | 2:43 |
| Total length: | | | 34:52 |

== The Light Sides ==
The Light Sides

Studio album by Hawk Nelson
- Released: February 8, 2011
- Genre: Acoustic
- Label: BEC

Packaged with Crazy Love is a second disc called "The Light Sides", which features 11 acoustic versions of Hawk Nelson favorites from the band's previous albums. "Stagefright" is not featured on any of Hawk Nelson's previous albums.

Crazy Love additional tracks version
| No. | Title | Original studio recording on | Length |
|---|---|---|---|
| 1. | "California" | Letters to the President | 2:26 |
| 2. | "Friend Like That" | Hawk Nelson Is My Friend | 2:50 |
| 3. | "Zero" | Smile, It's the End of the World | 3:28 |
| 4. | "Stagefright" | | 2:21 |
| 5. | "First Time" | Letters to the President | 2:31 |
| 6. | "You Have What I Need" | Hawk Nelson Is My Friend | 2:36 |
| 7. | "Everything You Ever Wanted" | Smile, It's the End of the World | 4:10 |
| 8. | "Head On Collision" | Smile, It's the End of the World | 3:04 |
| 9. | "Long Ago" | Live Life Loud | 2:54 |
| 10. | "Take Me" | Letters to the President | 3:41 |
| 11. | "36 Days" | Letters to the President | 4:08 |

Independent album version
| No. | Title | Original studio recording on | Length |
|---|---|---|---|
| 1. | "California" | Letters to the President | 2:26 |
| 2. | "Friend Like That" | Hawk Nelson Is My Friend | 2:50 |
| 3. | "Zero" | Smile, It's the End of the World | 3:28 |
| 4. | "My Next Breath" | Crazy Love | 3:36 |
| 5. | "Stagefright" | | 2:21 |
| 6. | "First Time" | Letters to the President | 2:31 |
| 7. | "You Have What I Need" | Hawk Nelson Is My Friend | 2:36 |
| 8. | "We Can Change the World" | Crazy Love | 3:19 |
| 9. | "Everything You Ever Wanted" | Smile, It's the End of the World | 4:10 |
| 10. | "Head On Collision" | Smile, It's the End of the World | 3:04 |
| 11. | "Long Ago" | Live Life Loud | 2:54 |
| 12. | "Take Me" | Letters to the President | 3:41 |
| 13. | "36 Days" | Letters to the President | 4:08 |

== Personnel ==
Hawk Nelson

- Jason Dunn
- Jonathan Steingard
- Daniel Biro
- Justin Benner

Additional musicians

- Tim Lauer – keyboards
- Aaron Shannon – programming
- Jeff Savage – additional programming (3)
- Mike Payne – additional guitars (4)

=== Production ===
- Brandon Ebel – executive producer
- Jeff Carver – A&R
- Ian Eskelin – producer
- Aaron Shannon – recording, editing
- Barry Weeks – additional vocal production, additional recording
- J.R. McNeely – mixing at ELM Studio South (Nashville, Tennessee)
- Adam Hull – mix assistant
- Troy Glessner – mastering at Spectre Studios (Tacoma, Washington)
- Bonnie Biro – art direction
- Invisible Creature – art direction
- Ryan Clark – design
- David Molnar – photography
- Ryan Rettler – management

The Light Sides

- Steve Wilson – keyboards, programming, percussion, vocal arrangements, producer
- Derek West – bass vocals
- J.R. McNeely – mixing

== Charts ==
Chart performance for Crazy Love
| Chart (2011) | Peak position |
|---|---|
| US Billboard 200 | 87 |
| US Top Alternative Albums (Billboard) | 12 |
| US Top Christian Albums (Billboard) | 3 |
| US Top Rock Albums (Billboard) | 21 |
