= Invisible Creature =

Seattle illustration and design studio

Invisible Creature is an illustration and graphic design studio based in Seattle, Washington. It is run by brothers Don and Ryan Clark and was formed in 2006. Don and Ryan are also the co-founders of Asterik Studio (2000-2008). Clients include: NASA, Pixar, Target, Apple, USPS, LEGO, Warby Parker, Cinerama, etc. Don is also Art Director at Canlis restaurant in Seattle. Some of the studio's designs are highlighted in the two brothers' book "Face the Music: Twenty Years of Album Art". The book highlights Invisible Creature's work in album design and the meaning behind some of their more well known works.

Invisible Creature has created CD packaging, poster art, web design, and merchandise design for artists such as Alice in Chains, Kendrick Lamar, Billy Idol, Mae, Anberlin, Pennywise, Earth Crisis, August Burns Red, Lecrae, Foo Fighters, Wolfmother, Korn, Kanye West, The Chariot, Stone Sour, Underoath and Poison the Well. The studio also has been nominated for 4 Grammy Awards for album packaging: Norma Jean's O God, the Aftermath, Fair's The Best Worst-Case Scenario., Hawk Nelson's Hawk Nelson Is My Friend and The Fold Secrets Keep You Sick.

== Inspirations ==
In their more formative years they were inspired by their grandfather, Alfred Paulsen, who was also an illustrator and their father who spent a lot of his free time making wooden goods. Stating that "The desire to create, and the potential to do it with precision and imagination, was simply ingrained in us".

Finding punk rock when they were teens broaden their aspirations and passion towards music, as well. Creating bands and even touring around the nation.

After they both married, Ryan and Don began to take design as well as the company more seriously. Already with many contacts in the music industry giving them many opportunities with friends and labels, the two decided to jump into design full-time, allowing them to “fuse their two passions together”.

== History ==
They moved to Seattle, Washington where the company is now based in 2000 because they wanted to pursue careers in both design and music. They created their first legitimate design company Asterik Studio and spent five years working there. Allowing them to expand their portfolios while their new founded metal band also gained a lot of traction.

In 2006 they had a mutual split with Asterik Studio and with more passion for illustration and focus on their own print designs they launched Invisible Creature.
