= Cathedrals (album) =

Studio album by Tenth Avenue North
- Released: November 10, 2014
- Studio: Blackbird Studios (Nashville, Tennessee)
- Genre: Contemporary Christian music, Christian rock, contemporary worship music, pop rock
- Length: 43:26
- Label: Reunion
- Producer: John Fields

Tenth Avenue North chronology
The Struggle (2012)	Cathedrals (2014)	Followers (2016)

Cathedrals is the fourth major studio album from Christian pop-rock band Tenth Avenue North. Reunion Records, a label of Provident Label Group, released the project on November 10, 2014. Tenth Avenue North worked with producer John Fields in the creation of this album.

== Critical reception ==
Professional ratings
Review scores
Source	Rating
365 Days of Inspiring Media	4.5/5 stars
CCM Magazine	3/5 stars
Christian Music Review	3.8/5
Cross Rhythms	9/10 squares
Jesus Freak Hideout	3.5/5 stars 4/5 stars
Jesus Wired	10/10 stars
New Release Tuesday	4.5/5 stars

Cathedrals received positive reviews from critics. Indicating in a nine out of ten review for Cross Rhythms, Matthew Cordle mentions, "In summary, a great set of songs that build on past work and delivers a strong message from one of the best bands currently working in CCM." Sarah Fine, writing in a four and a half star review for New Release Tuesday, realizes, "This is a worthy effort by an incredible band seeking to say honest things." Referencing in a three and a half star review for Jesus Freak Hideout, Roger Gelwicks explains, "Cathedrals feels unsurprising, but also genuine... It's inconsistent, but also entirely respectable, and it's this latter quality that makes for a landmark CCM release this fall." Andy Argyrakis from CCM Magazine, in a three star review, suggesting, "Musically speaking, the contemporary pop arrangements are pleasant and simple, while front man Mike Donehey’s smooth delivery is a fitting vehicle to convey encouragement and comfort to fellow believers." Awarding the album four and a half stars for 365 Days of Inspiring Media, Emily Kjonaas writes, "With lyrics that continually point Heavenward, and melodies that are soothing to one’s spirit, it’s no wonder why they are well-liked." Laura Chambers, rating the album a 3.8 out of five for Christian Music Review, says, "Cathedrals gently nudges us towards the light with convicting words and grand promises that to our cynical hearts seem too good to be true." Awarding the album ten stars at Jesus Wired, Maddy Agers writes, "it’s a literal masterpiece."

== Track listing ==
Standard edition
No.	Title	Writer(s)	Length
1.	"No Man Is An Island"	Mike Donehey, Jason Jamison, Ruben Juarez, Jeff Owen, Brendon Shirley	4:16
2.	"Stars In the Night"	Donehey, Jamison, Juarez, Owen, Shirley	3:43
3.	"Iesu, dulcis memoria" (featuring Audrey Assad)	attributed to St. Bernard of Clairvaux	0:56
4.	"Cathedrals"	Donehey, Jamison, Juarez, Owen, Shirley	4:20
5.	"I Need You, I Love You, I Want You"	Donehey, Owen	4:06
6.	"The Spark"	Donehey, Jamison, Juarez, Owen, Shirley	4:12
7.	"Heaven's Sound"	Donehey, Jamison, Juarez, Owen, Shirley	3:54
8.	"Stay"	Donehey, Jamison, Juarez, Owen, Shirley	4:17
9.	"We Won't Numb the Pain/Fire"	Donehey, Jamison, Juarez, Owen, Shirley	4:56
10.	"Closer"	Donehey, Jamison, Juarez, Owen, Shirley	3:41
11.	"All the Earth Is Holy Ground"	Donehey	5:05
Total length:			43:26

Deluxe edition
No.	Title	Writer(s)	Length
12.	"For Those Who Can't Speak" (featuring Derek Minor and KB)	Kevin Burgess, Donehey, Jamison, Juarez, Minor, Owen, Shirley	3:18
13.	"Just Getting By"	Donehey, Jamison, Juarez, Owen, Shirley	3:21
14.	"Forgive Me"	Donehey, Jamison, Juarez, Owen, Shirley	4:36
Total length:			55:01

== Personnel ==
Tenth Avenue North

- Mike Donehey – vocals, guitars
- Brendon Shirley – acoustic piano, Hammond B3 organ, keyboards, programming, vocals, string arrangements (5, 6)
- Jeff Owen – guitars, vocals, elf noises
- Ruben Juarez – guitars, bass guitar, synth bass, vocals
- Jason Jamison – drums, percussion, programming, vocals

Additional musicians

- John Fields – keyboards, programming, "tasty bits"
- Stu G – electric guitar (11)
- Brian Sanders – cello (5)
- Kanene Pipkin – vocals (1, 5)
- Audrey Assad – vocals (3)
- Tim Combs – vocals (10)
- Derek Minor – vocals (12)
- KB – vocals (12)
- Luke Pinder – interpretive melody (13)
- Tom Harpour – vocals (14)

=== Production ===
- Terry Hemmings – executive producer
- Jordyn Thomas – A&R
- John Fields – producer, recording, mixing
- Paul David Hager – mixing
- Ernesto Olivera – engineer, assistant engineer
- Brandon Schnierer – studio intern
- Howie Weinberg – mastering
- Michelle Box – A&R production
- Beth Lee – art direction
- Tim Parker – art direction, design
- Ry Cox – photography
- Dave Steunenbrink – management

== Charts ==
Chart (2014)	Peak position
US Billboard 200	32
US Christian Albums (Billboard)	1
US Digital Albums (Billboard)	23
US Top Rock Albums (Billboard)	9
