= Made (Hawk Nelson album) =

Studio album by Hawk Nelson
- Released: April 2, 2013
- Recorded: 2012–13
- Genre: Alternative rock, emo, Christian Punk
- Length: 44:07
- Label: Fair Trade
- Producer: Seth Mosley; Jonathan Steingard

Hawk Nelson chronology
Crazy Love (2011)	Made (2013)	Diamonds (2015)

Made is the sixth studio album by Christian rock band Hawk Nelson, which was produced by Seth Mosley and guitarist Jonathan Steingard. It was released on April 2, 2013 on the Fair Trade Services record label.

It is the band's first album since the departure of lead vocalist Jason Dunn, with Steingard taking over as lead vocalist. The album marks the band's shift from the pop punk genre to a softer, contemporary alternative pop rock and has been met with commercial and critical success.

== Music and lyrics ==
AllMusic's Tim Sendra found that the "mix of uplifting rockers, stadium-ready ballads, and straight-ahead pop songs makes for a varied listening experience and the trio espouses its strong love of God with an easygoing approach that won't turn off listeners whose faith may not be as strong but still want to hear some nice non-threatening modern rock", however "if they ever get tired of making epic-sounding albums like Made. Until then, Hawk Nelson will do fine sticking to the tried and true formula they use here." At Christian Music Zine, Joshua Andre affirmed that "Made will have its haters, yet many more will be touched and impacted by the diverse music and honest lyrics that Jon, Justin and Daniel bring to the table." David Bunce of CM Addict wrote it would be "a great album for music enthusiasts everywhere" because the album has much "diversity demonstrated".

Jonathan Andre of Indie Vision Music stated that the band released their "strongest (lyrically and musically)" engaging albums that is "full of life, vibrancy and hope", and alluded to how that we may "be surprised about how much you enjoy the riffs and guitar hooks, as well as the emotional and uplifting songs that call us into our destiny and identity with Christ in us and beside us." Jonathan Francesco of New Release Tuesday praised the music as being "a great fit to CCM without sounding watered down or copycat", which he said that the band "has given us a new sound to love" that has "clever and relevant lyrics". At Worship Leader, Mike Pueschell highlighted that "there's a noticeable ratcheting back on the punk sound".

== Critical reception ==
Professional ratings
Review scores
Source	Rating
Allmusic	3.5/5 stars
CCM Magazine	3/5 stars
Christian Music Zine	4.5/5 stars 4/5 stars
CM Addict	4.5/5 stars
Cross Rhythms	8/10 squares
Indie Vision Music	4/5 stars
Jesus Freak Hideout	4/5 stars 3/5 stars
New Release Tuesday	4/5 stars
Worship Leader	4/5 stars

Made has achieved generally favorable and positive reviews from the eight critics, so far. Allmusic's Tim Sendra called it "another big-hearted, big-sounding emo-pop album that's fully stocked with big, hooky choruses", which features "far more pop in their sound than there is emo and not a single note, vocal, or emotion is out of place", and noted that the "sound is very much of the time with Auto-Tune, fake turntable scratches, little bits of electronics poking through the edges of the mix." At CCM Magazine, Matt Conner told that the "new album is marked by positive and powerful pop anthems...the band still holds a bit of its youthful zeal," but "these guys have definitely grown up." Joshua Andre of Christian Music Zine vowed that "Hawk Nelson may not sound as they did in their previous albums, but these young men of God have a fantastic heart for Jesus, and it shows through these new offerings, and as eloquently mentioned by Jon", but that "no doubt this album will be one of the most talked about for the coming months; and it’s clear that the new Hawk Nelson have plenty more albums in them." Also, Christian Music Zine's Tyler Hess reviewed the album, saying that he was "fairly pleased with this rendition of Hawk Nelson and although ranking it with prior albums might be unfair I’d say it would be somewhere in the middle based on this somewhat early opinion." David Bunce of CM Addict called the songs "encouraging, captivating, and catchy". At Cross Rhythms, Graeme Crawford found that "some of their ballads are a bit generic, and some may find that it doesn't rock enough for them, but it is rare that [he] find[s] a CD [he] enjoy[s] that [his] family does too, and that's got to be a good thing."

Indie Vision Music's Jonathan Andre affirmed that "this is a welcomed change from a band that has continued and will continue to give us heartfelt melodies of redemption, hope and encouragement", and that "Hawk Nelson's latest album is a treasure from start to finish". At Jesus Freak Hideout, John "Flip" Choquette highlighted that "Made is undeniably catchy, unabashedly truthful and honestly quite hard to stop listening to", and he implored us that it is "easy to be a skeptic and write something off without giving it a chance, but when you do, you miss out on something special", which he portends that we "don't let that happen with Made, because you might just miss one of the best albums of the year." On the other side of the coin, Bert Gangl of Jesus Freak Hideout found that "while there's absolutely nothing wrong with the pop idiom, in and of itself, or even trading in one's punk roots for a kinder, gentler sound, much of what appears on the new record, pleasant though it is, fails to make much of a lasting impression." New Release Tuesday's Jonathan Francesco asked a question about the album "is it any good?", which he wrote that "the short answer is: definitely." At Worship Leader, Mike Pueschell told that the album has a "subtly updated sound" that should be "likely palatable and welcome change for Hawk Nelson’s maturing fan base".

== Commercial performance ==
Made has been the No. 192 most sold album in the United States, which is evidenced by the Billboard 200 chart position, and this happened on April 20, 2013 charts. In addition, the album was the No. 15 most sold Christian Albums in the United States, for the same week.

== Track listing ==
Made
No.	Title	Writer(s)	Length
1.	"What I'm Looking For"	Steingard	3:26
2.	"A Million Miles Away"	Seth Mosley, Aaron Rice, Steingard	2:40
3.	"Words" (featuring Bart Millard of MercyMe)	Matt Hammitt, Mosley, Steingard	3:24
4.	"Elevator" (featuring Blanca of Group 1 Crew)	Jordan Mohilowski, Rice, Steingard	3:21
5.	"Every Beat of My Broken Heart"	Steingard	3:50
6.	"Made"	Phillip LaRue, Mosley, Steingard	3:52
7.	"Love Like That"	Rice, Steingard	3:35
8.	"Through the Fire" (featuring Mike Donehey of Tenth Avenue North)	Mike Donehey, Steingard	3:48
9.	"Faithful"	Steingard, Sam Tinnesz	4:08
10.	"Anyone But You"	Mosley, Rice, Steingard	3:02
11.	"Outside the Lines"	Steingard	4:08
12.	"Fighting For"	Steingard	4:53
Total length:			44:07

== Personnel ==
Hawk Nelson

- Jon Steingard – vocals, keyboards, acoustic piano, programming, guitars
- Daniel Biro – bass
- Justin Benner – drums, percussion

Additional musicians

- Tim Lauer – keyboards, acoustic piano, programming
- Seth Mosley – keyboards, acoustic piano, programming, guitars, vocals
- Travis Terrell – keyboards, acoustic piano, programming
- Scott Mills – guitars
- David Henry – cello, viola
- Matt Hammitt – vocals
- Julie Ross – vocals
- Bart Millard – vocals (3)
- Blanca – vocals (4)
- Mike Donehey – vocals (8)

=== Production ===
- Seth Mosley – producer, mixing (1, 5, 12)
- Jon Steingard – producer (8, 11)
- Ainslie Grosser – mixing (2, 4, 6, 7, 9, 10)
- Neal Avron – mixing (3)
- Allen Salmon – mixing (8, 11)
- Dave McNair – mastering at Dave McNair Mastering (Winston-Salem, North Carolina)
- Bonnie Biro – art direction, design
- Joe Banta – photography
- David Molnar – photography

== Charts ==
=== Album ===
Chart (2013)	Peak position
US Billboard 200	192
US Top Christian Albums (Billboard)	15
