= Hawk Nelson Is My Friend =

Hawk Nelson...Is My Friend!

Studio album by Hawk Nelson
- Released: April 1, 2008
- Studio: House of Loud (Elmwood Park, New Jersey); Flicklght Recording Co.; Elm Studio South (Nashville, Tennessee)
- Genre: Christian rock, pop punk, punk rock
- Length: 37:33
- Label: BEC
- Producer: David Bendeth; Steve Wilson

Hawk Nelson chronology
Gloria (2006)	Hawk Nelson...Is My Friend! (2008)	Summer (2009)

Professional ratings
Review scores
Source	Rating
AllMusic	3.5/5 stars
Jesus Freak Hideout	4/5 stars
Soulshine	3/5 stars
SovMag	A−

Hawk Nelson...Is My Friend! is the third full-length studio album from Christian rock band Hawk Nelson. It was released on April 1, 2008, debuting at No. 34 on the Billboard 200. In the first week of its release the album sold a little over 30,000 copies. Hawk Nelson wrote the songs, as usual together with Trevor McNevan, but this time also with Richard Marx and Raine Maida. The album was produced by award-winning David Bendeth (Paramore, The Red Jumpsuit Apparatus).

The album artwork, created by Invisible Creature, was nominated for a Grammy in 2008 for Best Recording Package.

== Singles ==
"Friend Like That" was the first single from the album, released in the iTunes Store on December 24, 2007. A music video was filmed for the song. In 2008, "You Have What I Need" was released as the second single, as well as the track "One Little Miracle". Also the album track "Let's Dance" has been released in three versions as an EP.

== Accolades ==
In 2009, the album was nominated for a Dove Award for Recorded Music Packaging of the Year at the 40th GMA Dove Awards.

== Track listing ==
All tracks are written by Hawk Nelson and Trevor McNevan except where noted.

No.	Title	Writer(s)	Length
1.	"You Have What I Need"		2:34
2.	"Friend Like That"		2:49
3.	"Turn It On"		3:09
4.	"One Little Miracle"	Richard Marx, Hawk Nelson	2:58
5.	"Let's Dance"		3:09
6.	"Ancient History"	David Bendeth, Walt Lafty, Brian Weaver, Nick Perri	3:11
7.	"Somebody Else"	Raine Maida, Hawk Nelson	3:18
8.	"Arms Around Me"		3:31
9.	"Just Like Me"	Matthew Gerrard, Hawk Nelson	2:39
10.	"Not The Same"	Holly Knight, Hawk Nelson	3:30
11.	"Words We Speak"	Elizabeth Hopper, Andrew Bojanic, Hawk Nelson	2:54
12.	"I Still Miss You"		3:51

Special edition bonus tracks
No.	Title	Writer(s)	Length
13.	"One Little Miracle" (Acoustic) (featuring Amy Grant)	Richard Marx, Hawk Nelson	3:04
14.	"Friend Like That" (Acoustic)		2:49
15.	"Bring 'Em Out (Yours, Mine, and Ours Version)" (featuring Drake Bell)		3:24

== Personnel ==
Hawk Nelson

- Jason Dunn – lead vocals, guitars
- Jonathan Steingard – guitars, backing vocals
- Daniel Biro – bass, backing vocals
- Justin Benner – drums, percussion

Additional musicians

- Nick Perry – guitars
- John Bender – backing vocals
- Walt Lafty – backing vocals
- Amy Grant – vocals (13)
- Drake Bell – vocals (15)

=== Production ===
- Brandon Ebel – executive producer
- Jeff Carver – A&R
- David Bendeth – producer (1–6, 8–11), mixing (1–6, 8–11), arrangements
- Steve Wilson – producer (7, 12–14)
- Aaron Sprinkle – producer (15)
- J.R. McNeely – mixing (7, 12–14)
- Hawk Nelson – arrangements
- John Bender – additional vocal producer, engineer, digital editing
- Kato Khandwala – engineer, digital editing
- Dan Korneff – engineer, digital editing
- Kyle Cadena – technical assistance
- Anthony Fontana – technical assistance
- John Tomaszewski – technical assistance
- Ted Jensen – mastering at Sterling Sound (New York, NY)
- Invisible Creature – art direction
- Don Clark – design, illustration
- Jeremy Cowart – band photography
- Neil Visel – band photography
- Teresa Davis – management

== Special edition ==
The special edition CD/DVD set of the album featured three bonus tracks, and a paper board game. It also included a DVD featuring behind the scenes videos: "In the Studio (with Amy Grant)", "The Making of the 'Friend Like That' Music Video", and "Skydiving", plus four of Hawk Nelson's music videos, including:

- "Friend Like That" originally recorded on Hawk Nelson Is My Friend
- "Zero" originally recorded on Smile, It's the End of the World
- "The One Thing I Have Left" originally recorded on Smile, It's the End of the World
- "California" originally recorded on Letters to the President
