= Jesu dulcis memoria =

Christian hymn

Jesu dulcis memoria is a Christian hymn often attributed to Saint Bernard of Clairvaux. The name can refer either to the entire poem, which, depending on the manuscript, ranges from forty-two to fifty-three stanzas, or only the first part. The hymn inspired other variants, such as the "De nomine Iesu."

Three sections of it are used as hymns in the Liturgy of the Hours of the Feast of the Holy Name of Jesus: "Iesu dulcis memoria" (Vespers), "Iesu rex admirabilis" (Matins), "Iesu decus angelicum" (Lauds).

Several English hymns sung today are based on translations of Jesu dulcis memoria. These include "Jesus, Thou Joy of Loving Hearts" (1858 translation by Ray Palmer) and "Jesus, the Very Thought of Thee" (1849 translation by Edward Caswall).

== Opening stanzas ==
(See Thesaurus Precum Latinarum)

Latin text	Non-metrical (literal) English version	Edward Caswall translation
Jesu dulcis memoria dans vera cordis gaudia: sed super mel et omnia ejus dulcis praesentia. Nil canitur suavius, nil auditur jucundius, nil cogitatur dulcius, quam Jesus Dei Filius. Jesu, spes paenitentibus, quam pius es petentibus! quam bonus te quaerentibus! sed quid invenientibus? Nec lingua valet dicere, nec littera exprimere: expertus potest credere, quid sit Jesum diligere. Sis, Jesu, nostrum gaudium, qui es futurus praemium: sit nostra in te gloria, per cuncta semper saecula. Amen.	The sweet memory of Jesus Giving true joy to the heart: But more than honey and all things His sweet presence. Nothing more delightful is sung, Nothing more pleasing heard, Nothing sweeter thought, Than Jesus, the Son of God. O Jesus, hope of the penitent, How gracious you are to those who ask How good to those who seek you; But what [are you] to those who find? No tongue may tell, No letter express; He who has experience of it can believe What it is to love Jesus. O Jesus, may you be our joy, You who are our future reward. May our glory be in you Throughout all eternity. Amen	Jesus, the very thought of Thee, with sweetness fills my breast, but sweeter far Thy face to see, and in Thy presence rest. Nor voice can sing, nor heart can frame, nor can the memory find a sweeter sound than Thy blest Name, o Savior of mankind. O hope of every contrite heart! O joy of all the meek! To those who fall, how kind Thou art! How good to those who seek! But what to those who find? Ah! this Nor tongue nor pen can show The love of Jesus, what it is, None but His loved ones know. Jesus, our only hope be Thou, As Thou our prize shalt be; Jesus, be Thou our glory now, And through eternity. Amen.

== Music ==
The tune to which the hymn was sung can be heard at Oremus Hymnal. It has also been set to music by Giovanni Pierluigi da Palestrina, Tomás Luis de Victoria, and others.

Alan Gray's 1928 anthem What are these that glow from afar?, composed in memory of his two sons lost in the war, uses a quotation from Jesu dulcis memoria to great effect.

Tenth Avenue North covered the song on their album Cathedrals.
