= Strong Enough to Save =

Single by Tenth Avenue North

from the album The Light Meets the Dark
- Released: April 20, 2010
- Recorded: Conservatory Park
- Genre: CCM, pop rock
- Length: 3:13
- Label: Reunion
- Songwriter(s): Mike Donehey; Jason Ingram; Phillip LaRue
- Producer(s): Jason Ingram; Rusty Varenkamp; Phillip LaRue

Tenth Avenue North singles chronology
"Healing Begins" (2010)	"Strong Enough to Save" (2010)	"You Are More" (2010)

"Strong Enough To Save" is a song by Christian band Tenth Avenue North from their 2010 album, The Light Meets the Dark. It was released on April 20, 2010, as the second single. The song became the band's second Hot Christian Songs No. 1, staying there for three weeks. It lasted 42 weeks on the overall chart. The song is played in an E major key, at 130 beats per minute.

== Charts ==
=== Weekly charts ===
Chart (2010)	Peak position
US Christian AC (Billboard)	2
US Christian Airplay (Billboard)	1
US Christian Songs (Billboard)	1
US Christian AC Indicator (Billboard)	2
US Christian Soft AC (Billboard)	18

=== Year-end charts ===
Chart (2011)	Peak position
US Christian Songs (Billboard)	38
