= Over and Underneath =

Studio album by Tenth Avenue North
- Released: May 20, 2008
- Studio: Emack Studio and Blue42 (Franklin, Tennessee); The Smoakstack and Bridgeway Studios (Nashville, Tennessee)
- Genre: CCM, pop rock
- Length: 44:07
- Label: Reunion
- Producer: Jason Ingram; Phillip LaRue; Rusty Varenkamp

Tenth Avenue North chronology
Over and Underneath (2008)	The Light Meets the Dark (2010)

Singles from Over and Underneath
- 1. "Love Is Here" Released: April 8, 2008; 2. "By Your Side" Released: August 26, 2008; 3. "Hold My Heart" Released: 2009

Professional ratings
Review scores
Source	Rating
Allmusic	3.5/5 stars
Jesus Freak Hideout	3.5/5 stars
Cross Rhythms	8/10 stars

Over and Underneath is the first major label studio album from Christian pop rock band Tenth Avenue North. It was released on May 20, 2008, and peaked at No. 130 on the Billboard 200 in April 2009. The album features two No. 1 singles: "Love Is Here" and "By Your Side". It has been certified Gold status, selling over 500,000 copies.

== Release ==
Over and Underneath was released on May 20, 2008, through Reunion Records. In April 2009, it peaked at No. 130 on the Billboard 200.

The album's lead single, "Love Is Here", was released in early 2008 and reached No. 1 on Christian contemporary hit radio (CHR) charts that year. According to Nielsen SoundScan, Tenth Avenue North ended 2008 as the best-selling new Christian music artist, and the only new artist to sell 100,000 digital copies of their album by the end of the year. "By Your Side", the album's second single, was released in late August 2008; it also became a No. 1 song, staying at the top of R&R's Christian CHR radio chart for three consecutive weeks in late January and February 2009.

"Hold My Heart" was featured on the soundtrack for the 2011 film October Baby. In February 2016, it was announced that the album had been certified as Gold, selling more than 500,000 copies.

== Track listing ==
Album release
No.	Title	Writer(s)	Length
1.	"Love Is Here"	Mike Donehey, Jason Ingram, Jason Jamison, Phillip LaRue, Drew Middleton	4:03
2.	"Lift Us Up To Fall"	Donehey, Ingram, Tedd Tjornhom	3:40
3.	"By Your Side"	Donehey, Ingram, LaRue	4:01
4.	"Let It Go"	Donehey, Ingram, Bebo Norman	3:18
5.	"Break Me Down"	Donehey	3:22
6.	"Hold My Heart"	Donehey, Ingram, LaRue	3:59
7.	"Times"	Donehey	4:16
8.	"Beloved"	Donehey	4:31
9.	"You Are"	Donehey	3:50
10.	"Satisfy"	Donehey, Ingram, LaRue	3:50
11.	"Hallelujah"	Donehey, Ingram, LaRue	5:20
Total length:			44:07

iTunes bonus track
No.	Title	Length
12.	"Lovesick"	3:38

== Personnel ==
Tenth Avenue North

- Mike Donehey – lead vocals, acoustic guitars
- Jeff Owen – electric guitars, backing vocals
- Scott Sanders – bass
- Jason Jamison – drums

Additional musicians

- Jason Ingram – programming, backing vocals
- Rusty Varenkamp – programming
- Paul Moak – electric guitars
- Tony Lucido – bass
- Chris Carmichael – strings
- David Henry – strings
- Phillip LaRue – backing vocals

=== Production ===
- Terry Hemmings – executive producer
- Jordyn Thomas – A&R
- Jason Ingram – producer
- Phillip LaRue – producer
- Rusty Varenkamp – producer, engineer, editing, drum editing, mixing (10)
- Tom Laune – mixing (1–9, 11)
- Ben Phillips – drum editing
- Matt West – drum editing
- Heather Hetzler – A&R production
- Bekka Blackburn – art direction
- Tim Parker – art direction, design
- Kristin Barlowe – photography
- Samantha Roe – styling
- Showdown Management – management

== Charts ==
=== Weekly charts ===
Chart (2008)	Peak position
US Christian Albums (Billboard)	2
US Billboard 200	130

== Trivia ==
- On the cover, the lyrics to "Times" are displayed on the blue wall behind the artists. Also, the album is named for this song's lyrics: "My love is over. It's underneath. It's inside. It's in between."
