= Smile, It's the End of the World =

Studio album by Hawk Nelson
- Released: April 4, 2006
- Recorded: 2005–2006
- Studio: The Compound (Seattle, Washington)
- Genre: Pop punk, punk rock, Christian alternative rock
- Length: 44:09
- Label: Tooth & Nail
- Producer: Aaron Sprinkle

Hawk Nelson chronology
| Letters to the President (2004) | Smile, It's the End of the World (2006) | Gloria EP (2006) |

Professional ratings
Review scores
| Source | Rating |
|---|---|
| AllMusic | 3.5/5 stars |
| Jesus Freak Hideout | 4/5 stars |

Smile, It's the End of the World is the second full-length album by pop punk band Hawk Nelson. It was released on April 4, 2006.

The record was a 2007 GMA Dove Award nominee for Rock Album, produced by Aaron Sprinkle. It was also a nominee for Recorded Music Packaging, designed by Jason Powers. It is also the longest album by the band, as well as the debut of guitarist Jonathan Steingard. Smile, It's the End of the World charted at No. 75 on the Billboard 200 after selling more than 14,000 copies in its opening week. "The Show" is on the Digital Praise PC game Guitar Praise.

== Track listing ==
All tracks are written by Daniel Biro, Jason Dunn, Trevor McNevan, unless otherwise noted

| No. | Title | Writer(s) | Length |
|---|---|---|---|
| 1. | "The One Thing I Have Left" | | 3:07 |
| 2. | "The Show" | | 3:13 |
| 3. | "Bring 'Em Out" | | 3:23 |
| 4. | "Everything You Ever Wanted" | | 4:04 |
| 5. | "Something On My Mind" | | 4:19 |
| 6. | "Is Forever Enough" | Biro, Dunn | 3:22 |
| 7. | "Zero" | | 4:38 |
| 8. | "Nothing Left to Show" | Biro, Dunn | 2:54 |
| 9. | "Head On Collision" | | 4:07 |
| 10. | "Hello" | | 3:00 |
| 11. | "It's Over" | | 3:06 |
| 12. | "Fourteen" | Biro, Dunn | 4:50 |
| Total length: | | | 44:27 |

A different version of "Bring 'Em Out", which features Drake Bell, was released on the band's 2005 EP of the same name and on the special edition of Hawk Nelson Is My Friend. The version with Bell was performed in the film Yours, Mine and Ours. The band's frontman, Jason Dunn, has said in an interview that there was going to be an actual title song, making the album have thirteen songs.

== Personnel ==
Hawk Nelson

- Jason Dunn – Vocals,Piano
- Jonathan Steingard – guitars
- Daniel Biro – bass
- Aaron "Skwid" Tosti – drums

Additional personnel

- Everett Dallas, Kenneth E. Larry, James Young, Willie Williams – vocals on "The Show"
- Josh Head – vocals on "Nothing Left to Show"

Production

- Brandon Ebel – executive producer
- Jonathan Dunn – A&R
- Aaron Sprinkle – producer, recording
- Trevor McNevan – pre-production
- J.R. McNeely – mixing
- Aaron Lipinski – additional recording, mix assistant
- Randy Torres – additional recording
- Brian Gardner – mastering at Bernie Grundman Mastering (Hollywood, California)
- Jason Powers – art direction, design, illustrations
- David Hill – photography
- Teresa Davis – management

== Singles ==
The band has released the song "Everything You Ever Wanted" on Christian radio. It peaked at No. 1 on the Christian Hit Radio format. "The Show" has appeared on Christian radio as well.

The band released a video and on the radio for "Zero" on May 30, 2007. It was the 15th most played song of 2007 on U.S. Christian Hit Radio stations.

== Awards ==
In 2007, the album was nominated for a Dove Award for Rock Album of the Year at the 38th GMA Dove Awards.
