= Followers (album) =

Studio album by Tenth Avenue North
- Released: October 14, 2016
- Studio: Ocean Way Recording, Blackbird Studios and Sputnik Sound (Nashville, Tennessee)
- Genre: Contemporary Christian music, synth-pop, pop rock
- Length: 38:21
- Label: Reunion
- Producer: John Fields; Colby Wedgeworth; Jason Ingram; Paul Mabury; Tenth Avenue North

Tenth Avenue North chronology
Cathedrals (2014)	Followers (2016)	Decade the Halls Vol. 1 (2017)

Followers is an album by the American CCM band Tenth Avenue North. It was released by Provident Label Group, a division of Sony Music Entertainment, under its Reunion Records label, on October 14, 2016. The album reached No. 5 on the Billboard Christian Albums chart, and No. 151 on the Billboard 200. Three singles from the album were released: "What You Want" in 2016, and "I Have This Hope" and "Control (Somehow You Want Me)" in 2017, all of which appeared on the Billboard Hot Christian Songs chart.

== Release and performance ==
Followers was released on October 14, 2016, by Provident Label Group LLC, a division of Sony Music Entertainment. It first charted on both the US Billboard Christian Albums and Billboard 200 on the week of November 5, 2016, peaking that week on both charts at No. 5 and No. 151, respectively.

Three singles were released from the album. The first, "What You Want", was released five months in advance of the album on May 13, 2016, and charted on the Billboard Hot Christian Songs list, peaking at No. 17 on September 3, 2016. The other two were released in 2017 after the album, and reached the top 10 on Hot Christian Songs: "I Have This Hope" peaked at No. 5 on June 10, 2017, and "Control (Somehow You Want Me)" peaked at No. 7 on January 13, 2018.

== Reception ==
CCM Magazine categorized the music as synth-pop/pop rock, and gave the album 4 out of 5 stars, and cited its "killer vocal work on honest, relatable lyrics paired with ... strong songwriting."

Christian review website JesusFreakHideout rated the album 3.5 out of 5 stars, noting that the band appeared to be moving away from their previous acoustic sound and into a more electronic and processed pop rock style. The review said the album was "pretty much what you would expect from a CCM release" and wrote that "What You Want" was "the most energetic song on the album". It singled out the opening track as "excellent" and the closing track as "powerful", and characterized the remaining songs as "eight solid but otherwise ordinary tracks."

== Track listing ==
1. "Afraid" (Mike Donehey, Jeff Owen) - 3:48
2. "What You Want" (Donehey, Jason Ingram, Colby Wedgeworth) - 3:37
3. "Overflow" (Donehey, Owen, Ruben Juarez, Brendon Shirley) - 3:40
4. "I Have This Hope" (Donehey, Owen, Ingram) - 3:24
5. "One Thing" (Donehey, Ingram) - 3:28
6. "Sparrow (Under Heaven's Eyes)" (Donehey, Jonathan Smith) - 3:59
7. "No One Can Steal Our Joy" (Donehey, Ingram) - 3:40
8. "Control (Somehow You Want Me)" (Donehey, Ingram, Matt Bronleewe) - 4:08
9. "Fighting for You" (Donehey, Micah Kulper) - 3:22
10. "I Confess" (Donehey, Owen, Juarez, Shirley) - 5:15

== Personnel ==
Tenth Avenue North

- Mike Donehey – vocals, guitars
- Jeff Owen – keyboards, programming, guitars, synth bass, vocals, elf noises, backing vocals (4, 5, 7, 8)
- Brendon Shirley – keyboards, programming, vocals
- Ruben Juarez – programming, guitars, bass guitar, synth bass, vocals, backing vocals (4, 5, 7, 8)
- Jason Jamison – drums, percussion, programming, vocals

Additional musicians

- John Fields – keyboards (1, 3, 9), programming (1, 3, 9), guitars (1, 3, 9), "tasty bits" (1, 3, 9)
- Colby Wedgeworth – programming (2), backing vocals (2)
- Jason Ingram – programming (4, 5, 7, 8), backing vocals (4, 5, 7, 8)
- Paul Mabury – programming (4, 5, 7, 8)
- Jeremy Larson – strings (4)
- Jonathan Smith – keyboards (6), programming (6)

=== Production ===
- Terry Hemmings – executive producer
- John Fields – producer (1, 3, 6, 9), recording (1, 3, 6, 9), mixing (1, 3, 6, 9)
- Colby Wedgeworth – producer (2), tracking (2), mixing (2)
- Jason Ingram – producer (2, 4, 5, 7, 8)
- Paul Mabury – producer (4, 5, 7, 8)
- Tenth Avenue North – producers (10)
- Paul David Hager – mixing (1, 3, 6, 9)
- Shane Wilson – tracking (4, 5, 7, 8)
- Sean Moffitt – mixing (4, 5, 7, 8)
- Keith Smith – vocal editing (4, 5, 7, 8)
- Jasper LeMaster – assistant engineer (1, 3, 6, 9), engineer (10)
- Jeff Owen – assistant engineer (10)
- Dave McNair – mastering
- Michelle Box – A&R production
- Jason Root – A&R production
- Robby Klein – photography
- Beth Lee – art direction
- Tim Parker – art direction, design
- Jonathan Powell – wardrobe stylist
- Kris Whipple – hair, make-up
- Dave Steunebrink – management

== Charts ==
Chart (2012)	Peak position
US Billboard 200	151
US Christian Albums (Billboard)	5
