= Friend Like That =

Single by Hawk Nelson

from the album Hawk Nelson Is My Friend
- Released: December 24, 2007
- Recorded: May 15, 2005
- Genre: Pop punk, Christian punk
- Length: 2:48 (Album Version), 2:50 (Single Version)
- Label: Tooth & Nail
- Songwriter(s): Hawk Nelson and Trevor McNevan
- Producer(s): Aaron Sprinkle

Hawk Nelson singles chronology
"Zero" (2006)	"Friend Like That" (2007)	"Live Life Loud" (2009)

"Friend Like That" is the first single from Hawk Nelson's third album, Hawk Nelson Is My Friend. It was released on Christmas Eve of 2007. This song is on the Digital Praise PC game Guitar Praise. This song was appearing by the compilation album WOW Hits 2009 and his regular versions.

== Release ==
"Friend Like That" was released as single through iTunes on December 24, 2007. In its first week of release to iTunes, the song sold 25,000 digital copies.

In the week of March 19, 2008, "Friend Like That" was at #5 on R&R's Christian CHR chart, and had jumped to the #3 position on the Christian rock songs chart. It ended 2008 as the eleventh most-played song on R&R magazine's Christian CHR chart for the year.

== Style ==
Allmusic reviewer Rick Anderson called the song "charmingly goofy. ['Friend Like That'] acts as the distilled essence of the band's trademark approach: slightly whimsical lyrics, a shout-along chorus, and a song that somehow adds up to more than the sum of its parts."

== Music video ==
In the music video for "Friend Like That", the band members are in a cartoon world, populated by characters and scenery also seen on the cover art and "board game" in the special-edition version of the album Hawk Nelson Is My Friend. Lead singer Jason Dunn is singing as he runs, while the others wait patiently for him to reach the group. He finally comes and they drive off. After stopping off, they enter a building and find themselves playing a live concert on stage.
