= The Light Meets the Dark =

Studio album by Tenth Avenue North
- Released: May 11, 2010
- Recorded: Conservatory Park (Nashville, Tennessee)
- Genre: CCM, pop rock
- Length: 45:17
- Label: Reunion
- Producer: Jason Ingram; Phillip LaRue; Rusty Varenkamp

Tenth Avenue North chronology
Over and Underneath (2008)	The Light Meets the Dark (2010)	The Struggle (2012)

Singles from The Light Meets the Dark
- 1. "Healing Begins" Released: March 2, 2010; 2. "Strong Enough to Save" Released: April 20, 2010; 3. "You Are More" Released: April 27, 2010; 4. "The Truth is Who You Are" Released: May 4, 2010

Professional ratings
Review scores
Source	Rating
Allmusic	4.5/5 stars
Christian Music Zine	(A−)
Jesus Freak Hideout	3.5/5 stars

The Light Meets the Dark is the second major label studio album from Christian pop rock band Tenth Avenue North. It was released on May 11, 2010, by Reunion Records.

== Background ==
Vocalist Mike Donehey said: "On this record I really tried to be honest about how messed up I am. We wanted it to be a collision between our hearts and God's truth. His grace collides with the dark inside of us. His blood can cover us and I'm trying to call people out and say 'Look, please do not hide your darkness. Expose that to the light.' I know that's the scariest thought, but its where freedom and healing starts to take place. It's where it all starts to happen."

== Track listing ==
Album release
No.	Title	Writer(s)	Length
1.	"Healing Begins"	Mike Donehey, Jason Ingram, Jeff Owen	3:57
2.	"Strong Enough to Save"	Donehey, Ingram, Phillip LaRue	3:13
3.	"You Are More"	Donehey, Ingram	3:37
4.	"The Truth Is Who You Are"	Donehey, Ingram	4:26
5.	"All the Pretty Things"	Donehey, Ingram, Owen	4:19
6.	"Any Other Way"	Donehey, Ingram	3:26
7.	"On and On"	Donehey, Ingram, Owen	3:42
8.	"Hearts Safe (A Better Way)"	Donehey, Owen	3:31
9.	"House of Mirrors"	Donehey, Jason Jamison, Scott Sanders, Owen	4:30
10.	"Empty My Hands"	Donehey	5:01
11.	"Oh My Dear"	Donehey, Garrett Green	5:35

== Personnel ==
Tenth Avenue North

- Mike Donehey – lead vocals, backing vocals, acoustic piano, acoustic guitars
- Jeff Owen – electric guitars, backing vocals
- Jason Jamison – drums, percussion

Additional musicians

- Jason Ingram – acoustic piano, programming, backing vocals
- Rusty Varenkamp – programming
- Scott Sanders – bass guitar (1–8, 10, 11)
- Ruben Juarez – bass guitar (9)
- Chris Carmichael – strings (1–3, 6)
- David Henry – strings (7, 10, 11)
- Ned Henry – strings (7, 10, 11)

=== Production ===
- Terry Hemmings – executive producer
- Jordyn Thomas – A&R
- Jason Ingram – producer
- Phillip LaRue – producer
- Rusty Varenkamp – producer, recording, editing
- Tom Laune – mixing
- Craig Swift – editing
- Thomas Toner – editing
- Andrew Mendelson – mastering at Georgetown Masters (Nashville, Tennessee)
- Michelle Box – A&R production
- Heather Hetzler – A&R production
- Crystal Varenkamp – production assistant
- Beth Lee – art direction
- Tim Parker – art direction, design
- Jeremy Cowart – photography
- Toby Baker – additional photography
- Tenth Avenue North – liner notes
- Samantha Roe – wardrobe
- Kristopher Whipple – grooming
- Dave Steunebrink – management
- Showdown Management – management

== Awards ==
The album was nominated for a Dove Award for Pop/Contemporary Album of the Year at the 42nd GMA Dove Awards.

== Charts ==
=== Weekly charts ===
Chart (2010)	Peak position
US Christian Albums (Billboard)	1
US Billboard 200	15
US Top Rock Albums (Billboard)	7
