= Zero (Hawk Nelson song) =

Single by Hawk Nelson

from the album Smile, It's the End of the World
- Released: April 4, 2006
- Recorded: 2005
- Genre: Alternative rock
- Length: 4:38
- Label: Tooth & Nail
- Songwriter(s): Biro, Dunn, McNevan
- Producer(s): Aaron Sprinkle

Hawk Nelson singles chronology
"Letters to the President" (2004)	"Zero" (2006)	"Friend Like That" (2008)

"Zero" is a song by the Christian alternative rock band Hawk Nelson from their album Smile, It's the End of the World. The song is about someone vocalist Jason Dunn knew who committed suicide. The song was released in 2006, and it was released again on May 30, 2007 as a single in the USA and Canada. The single was the 15th most-played song in 2007 on Christian Hit Radio stations in the United States according to R&R magazine.

== Video ==
The music video begins with an ambulance siren and then cuts to a girl who picks up a telephone and then sinks down against a wall with her head in her hands. The scene fades to black, and Jason Dunn appears at a piano, surrounded by a circle of words written on the ground. Throughout the video, people are shown with statements next to them. It also features Hawk Nelson's band members playing their instruments.
