= By Your Side (Tenth Avenue North song) =

Single by Tenth Avenue North

from the album Over and Underneath
- Released: August 2008
- Recorded: 2007–08
- Genre: Contemporary Christian music
- Length: 4:01
- Label: Reunion
- Songwriters: Mike Donehey, Jason Ingram, Phillip LaRue

Tenth Avenue North singles chronology
"Love Is Here" (2008)	"By Your Side" (2008)	"Hold My Heart" (2009)

"By Your Side" is a song by contemporary Christian band Tenth Avenue North from their debut album Over and Underneath. It was released as the album's lead single in August 2008, and reached number 1 on R&R's Christian contemporary hit radio chart in January 2009. In 2010, "By Your Side" won the Dove Award for Song of the Year. In addition, the song also appeared on compilation albums WOW Hits 2010 and WOW #1s.

The song peaked at No. 2 on the Hot Christian Songs chart. It lasted 58 weeks on the overall chart, their longest charting single. The song is played in a G major key at 130 beats per minute.

== Composition ==
The song is written from the perspective of Jesus Christ. Tenth Avenue North lead singer Mike Donehey's vocals have been compared to Jon Foreman. The lyrics talk of how Jesus promises to be with us through all the circumstances that we face in life. This song musically consists of a 3-note repetitive guitar pattern, simple piano, and gentle drums.

== Awards ==
In 2010, the song won a Dove Award for Song of the Year at the 41st GMA Dove Awards.

== Charts ==
=== Weekly charts ===
Chart (2008)	Peak position
US Christian AC (Billboard)	3
US Christian Airplay (Billboard)	2
US Hot Christian Songs (Billboard)	2
US Christian AC Indicator (Billboard)	1
US Christian Soft AC (Billboard)	19
US Heatseekers Songs (Billboard)	47

=== Year-end charts ===
Chart (2009)	Peak position
US Christian Songs (Billboard)	2

=== Decade-end charts ===
Chart (2000s)	Peak position
US Christian Songs (Billboard)	3

== Certifications ==
Region	Certification	Certified units/sales
United States (RIAA)	Platinum	1,000,000^{‡}
^{‡} Sales+streaming figures based on certification alone.
