= Live Life Loud =

Studio album by Hawk Nelson
- Released: September 22, 2009
- Studios: Legion of Boom Studio, Quad Studios and Elm Studio South (Nashville, Tennessee)
- Genres: Christian rock, alternative rock, pop punk
- Length: 42:13
- Label: BEC
- Producer: Steve Wilson

Hawk Nelson chronology
Summer (2009)	Live Life Loud (2009)	Crazy Love (2011)

Professional ratings
Review scores
Source	Rating
AllMusic	3.5/5 stars
Slumper	2/5 stars
Jesus Freak Hideout	3.5/5 stars

Live Life Loud is the fourth studio album from Christian rock band Hawk Nelson. It was released on September 22, 2009. According to Daniel Biro, the dog on the cover is lead vocalist Jason Dunn's dog Murphy. The album was packaged with a pair of 3D glasses that are needed to be worn to view the album's CD booklet which is printed in 3D. The album peaked at No. 54 the first week on Billboard 200 and at No. 3 on The Billboard Christian Albums charts.

== Concept and musical style ==
Bassist Daniel Biro describes the album as "really about encouraging our fans to do just that. To live your life loud, to embrace all that life brings your way and experience every moment of it to the fullest extent. This is the message we want our fans to come away with after they hear the album."

The album is the first time that the band wrote songs together by just jamming as a band, although the band collaborated with Chris Stevens, Matthew Gerrard, TobyMac, Trevor McNevan, and Bart Millard on the record.

== Track listing ==
Album release
No.	Title	Writer(s)	Length
1.	"Live Life Loud"	Hawk Nelson, Trevor McNevan	2:57
2.	"Never Enough"	Hawk Nelson, McNevan	2:57
3.	"Eggshells" (featuring tobyMac)	Hawk Helson, Christopher Stevens, Toby McKeehan	3:25
4.	"The Meaning of Life"	Hawk Nelson, Matthew Gerrard	3:47
5.	"Alive"	Hawk Nelson, Stevens	3:22
6.	"Ode to Lord Stanley" (Interlude)	Jason Dunn	1:55
7.	"Long Ago"	Hawk Nelson, Steve Wilson, Matt Maher	3:25
8.	"The Job"	Hawk Nelson, Chantal Kreviazuk, Wilson	2:54
9.	"Shaken"	Hawk Nelson, McNevan	3:45
10.	"Lest We Forget"	Hawk Nelson, Wilson	4:46
11.	"'Tis So Sweet"	Hawk Nelson, Wilson	4:05
12.	"The Final Toast"	Hawk Nelson, Wilson	5:02

Special edition bonus track
No.	Title	Writer(s)	Length
13.	"Live Life Loud" (Acoustic)	Hawk Nelson, Trevor McNevan

== Personnel ==
Hawk Nelson

- Jason Dunn – vocals
- Jonathan Steingard – guitars
- Daniel Biro – bass
- Justin Benner – drums

Additional musicians

- Steve Wilson – programming, guitars, percussion, backing vocals, string arrangements, arrangements (11)
- Justin Saunders – cello
- Zach Casebolt – violin
- Todd Boswell – bagpipes (11)
- Frankie Barranco, Lauren Conklin, Chelsea Goodwin and Christiana Sudano – gang vocals (1)
- TobyMac – vocals (3)
- Jenn Helvering – backing vocals (11)

=== Production ===
- Brandon Ebel – executive producer, A&R
- Jeff Carver – A&R
- Steve Wilson – producer, recording, interlude mixing
- J.R. McNeely – mixing
- Ted Jensen – mastering at Sterling Sound (New York, NY)
- Bonnie Biro – art direction, design concept
- Ryan Clark – design
- Caleb Kuhl – photography
- Teresa Davis – management

== Awards ==
In 2010, the album was nominated for a Dove Award for Recorded Music Packaging of the Year at the 41st GMA Dove Awards. The title song was also nominated for Short Form Music Video of the Year.
