= You Are More =

Single by Tenth Avenue North

from the album The Light Meets the Dark
- Released: April 27, 2010
- Genre: CCM, Christian rock, Christian alternative rock, pop rock
- Length: 3:37
- Label: Reunion
- Songwriters: Mike Donehey, Jason Ingram

Tenth Avenue North singles chronology
"Strong Enough to Save" (2010)	"You Are More" (2010)	"The Truth Is Who You Are" (2010)

Music video
- "You Are More" on YouTube

"You Are More" is a song by the Christian band Tenth Avenue North, released as the second single from their 2010 album The Light Meets the Dark. It is also on the WOW Hits 2012 compilation album. The video for the song won the "Short Form Music Video of the Year" at the 43rd GMA Dove Awards.

== Content ==
The song follows the story of a girl who believes that because of her sins and mistakes, she has "fallen too far to love". The song expresses the belief that a person is more than the mistakes and sins she has committed because she has salvation through Jesus Christ.

=== Music video ===
The music video shows the band playing the song in front of a massive chalkboard on which people have written their sins, doubts, mistakes, or questions. As the song reaches its peak, water begins to pour down the chalkboard, washing away the writing, symbolizing Christ washing away the sins of those who embrace Him. The music video has been blocked on YouTube for unknown reasons.

== Charts ==
=== Weekly charts ===
Chart (2011)	Peak position
US Christian AC (Billboard)	1
US Hot Christian Songs (Billboard)	1
US Christian AC Indicator (Billboard)	1
US Christian Soft AC (Billboard)	8

=== Year-end charts ===
Chart (2011)	Position
Billboard Christian Songs	1
Billboard Hot Christian AC	2
Billboard Hot Christian CHR	7
Billboard Christian Digital Songs	19

=== Decade-end charts ===
Chart (2010s)	Position
US Christian Songs (Billboard)	29

== Certifications ==
Region	Certification	Certified units/sales
United States (RIAA)	Gold	500,000^{‡}
^{‡} Sales+streaming figures based on certification alone.
