= This Too Shall Pass (The Fold album) =

2006 studio album by The Fold

Studio album by The Fold
- Released: February 21, 2006
- Recorded: 2005
- Genre: Alternative rock, post-punk, Christian rock
- Label: Tooth & Nail Records
- Producer: Steven Haigler

The Fold chronology
| This Too Shall Pass (2006) | Secrets Keep You Sick (2007) |

Professional ratings
Review scores
| Source | Rating |
|---|---|
| Allmusic | link |
| Christian Music Today | 4/5 stars |
| Jesus Freak Hideout | Link |

This too Shall Pass is the debut album of Chicago-based rock group The Fold. It was released in February 2006 on Tooth and Nail Records and features fourteen tracks. The title is a reference to the phrase "This, too, shall pass".

== Track listing ==
1. "Gravity"
2. "Backseat Drivers"
3. "New City"
4. "The Title Track"
5. "What is Right"
6. "Going for my Lungs"
7. "Evermore"
8. "Remnant"
9. "Rid of Me"
10. "Stay"
11. "With You, I Sink"
12. "We've Been At This"
13. "Surrounded"
14. "I Believe You"
- A digital version of the album was released on November 7, 2006, with four new songs:
15. "Away"
16. "Seasons"
17. "Once And For All (Acoustic)"
18. "Rid of Me (demo)"

== Miscellanea ==
- Track 1, "Gravity", contains a lyrical reference ("When will you be able to see past your hand?/I'm taking down empty pictures that we used to hold close before you") to "You Won't Ignore This", the opening track from The Fold's only secular (and first) release, Feeling Like Failure Now.
- Track 4, "The Title Track", features the lyrics "This too Shall Pass" in relation to the album name.
- Track 14, "I Believe You", features Matt Thiessen of Relient K.
- "Once and for All" and "I Believe You" were re‑recorded versions of songs originally appearing on Not of This World. "Stay" and "Surrounded" originated as b-sides recorded around the same time. "Away" originated on Feeling Like Failure Now.
