= Losing (Tenth Avenue North song) =

Single by Tenth Avenue North

from the album The Struggle
- Released: May 18, 2012
- Genre: CCM; Christian rock; pop rock; power pop; acoustic rock; indie rock
- Length: 3:32
- Label: Reunion
- Songwriters: Jeff Owen; Mike Donehey; Ruben Juarez

Tenth Avenue North singles chronology
"The Truth Is Who You Are" (2010)	"Losing" (2012)

Music video
- "Losing" on YouTube

"Losing" is a song by Christian contemporary Christian music band Tenth Avenue North from their third studio album, The Struggle. It released on May 18, 2012, as the first single from the album. The song peaked at No. 1 on the Christian Songs chart.

== Charts ==
On the Christian AC Indicator chart the song was the most added song of the week for the week of June 9, 2012, and was played 326 times, an increase of 202 plays over the previous week for the song. (Note: CHRISTIAN AC INDICATOR CHART: 6/9/2012)

On the Hot Christian AC chart, the song was the most added song of the week for the week of June 9, 2012, and was played 397 times, an increase of 158 plays from the previous week. (Note: CHRISTIAN AC NATIONAL AIRPLAY: 6/9/2012)

On the Christian CHR chart the song was the most added song of the week for the week of June 9, 2012, and was played 257 times, an increase of 197 plays from the previous week. (Note: CHRISTIAN CHR NATIONAL AIRPLAY: 6/9/2012)

== Release ==
"Losing" was released as the lead single from The Struggle on May 18, 2012.

== Charts ==
=== Weekly charts ===
Chart (2012)	Peak position
US Bubbling Under Hot 100 (Billboard)	20
US Christian AC (Billboard)	2
US Christian Airplay (Billboard)	2
US Hot Christian Songs (Billboard)	2
US Christian AC Indicator (Billboard)	3
US Christian Soft AC (Billboard)	17

=== Year-end charts ===
Chart (2012)	Peak position
US Christian Songs (Billboard)	9
