= Mike Donehey =

American Christian singer and songwriter

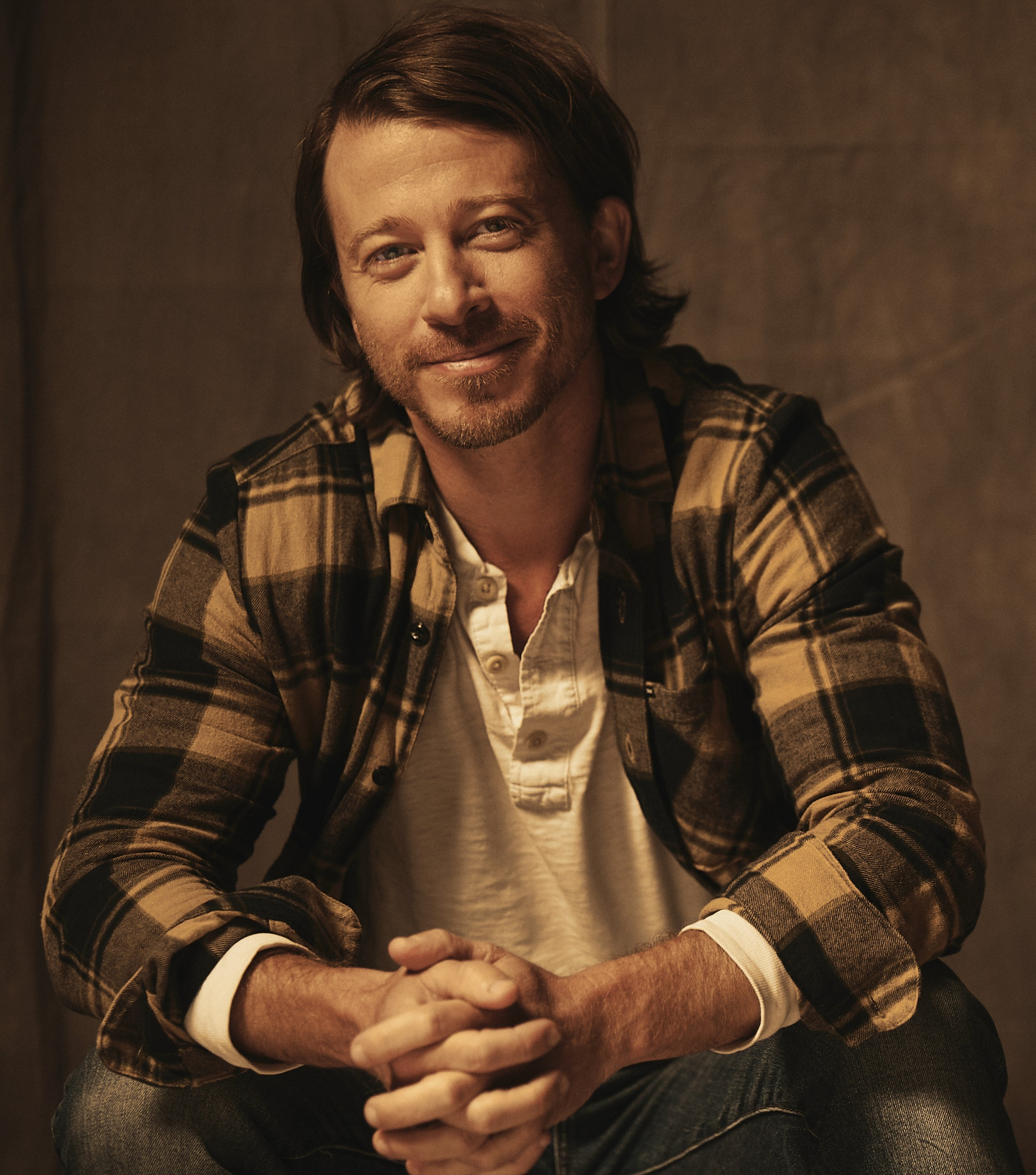
- Mike Donehey

Background information
- Born: Michael Morgan Donehey; September 30, 1980 (age 45); Omaha, Nebraska, United States
- Genres: Christian rock, CCM
- Occupation: Musician
- Instruments: Vocals, acoustic guitar
- Years active: 2000–present
- Website: https://www.mikedonehey.com/

Michael Morgan Donehey (born September 30, 1980) is an American singer, songwriter, and guitarist primarily known for his work in the contemporary Christian band Tenth Avenue North. After amicably disbanding in 2021, the band reformed with two new members in 2023 with Mike Donehey returning as lead singer. He is also a solo artist and has authored the books Finding God's Life for My Will and Grace in the Gray: A More Loving Way to Disagree and hosts the "Chasing the Beauty" podcast.

== Early life ==
Donehey was born to Dan and Sharon Donehey in Omaha, Nebraska in 1980. He graduated from Fredericksburg Christian School in Fredericksburg, Virginia in 1999. He attended FCS from kindergarten through graduation and played varsity soccer. Donehey was involved in a near-fatal, single-car accident on Mine Road in Spotsylvania County during his senior year of high school. He broke his back in two places, broke his skull, and had an ear ripped off. He was told he would never walk again. He picked up a guitar during his days in the hospital and began to write music. He recovered and moved to Florida to attend Palm Beach Atlantic University where Tenth Avenue North was formed.

== Musical and written work ==
Donehey founded Tenth Avenue North with Jason Jamison in 2000. The band grew to become one of the most popular acts in contemporary Christian music, releasing fifteen original music projects with multiple Billboard 200 albums and RIAA gold singles.

During his time with Tenth Avenue North, Donehey was a guest vocalist on tracks from Hawk Nelson, Lecrae, and Jars of Clay, among others.

In 2019, Donehey published his first book entitled Finding God's Life for My Will: His Presence is the Plan. Donehey said the book was inspired by a frequent question he received: "Young artists come up to me and say, 'How did you know this was God's will for your life?' And the question behind the question is, 'I want to do what you are doing. How can I get there?' I always respond to that question -- 'How did you know this was God's will for your life?' -- [saying] 'I don't and I never did.' Their face scrunches and they don't like that answer. We want to think God has an occupation for us because most of us view God as a means to some other end, a genie in a bottle and reward program. ... I don't think God is impressed with my resumé. He's calling for my heart, not my career. So Finding God's Life for My Will was the natural book to write to answer that question, to say, 'You need to stop worrying about what God's will for your life is. Stop asking God permission to go do what you love.' … God doesn't care if you are a banker as much as he cares as what kind of a banker are you." The book was an ECPA Bestseller.

Tenth Avenue North announced an amicable split in 2020, and Donehey began releasing music as a solo artist. He used crowdfunding to finance his first studio album, and reached his funding goal on Kickstarter in 13 hours. He released two EPs, Work of Art and A Father and Two Sons, as well as a single, Better, in 2020. After Tenth Avenue North played its farewell shows and formally disbanded in April 2021, he released his first single as a solo artist, "All Together". His first studio album, Flourish, was released on August 27, 2021.

In November 2022, Donehey released a new single called "Yeshua (Friend of Sinners)". This was followed up with a version of the song featuring Jillian Edwards, released on April 7, 2023 (Good Friday).

== Discography ==
=== Tenth Avenue North ===
- Over and Underneath (2008)
- The Light Meets the Dark (2010)
- The Struggle (2012)
- Cathedrals (2014)
- Followers (2016)
- No Shame (2019)

=== Solo ===
==== Studio albums ====
| Year | Album details | Peak chart positions | Certifications |
| Year | Album details | US Christian | Certifications |
|---|---|---|---|
| 2021 | Flourish: Released: August 27, 2021; Label: Fair Trade Services | — | |

==== EPs ====
| Year | Album details | Peak chart positions | Certifications |
| Year | Album details | US Christ. | Certifications |
|---|---|---|---|
| 2021 | Work of Art: Released: March 2, 2021; Label: Independent | — | |
| 2021 | A Father & Two Sons: Released: March 9, 2021; Label: Independent | — | |

==== Singles ====
| Year | Single | Chart positions | | | Certifications | Album |
| Year | Single | US Christ | US Christ Airplay | US Christ AC | Certifications | Album |
|---|---|---|---|---|---|---|
| 2020 | "Better" | — | — | — | | non-album single |
| 2021 | "All Together" | — | 18 | 20 | | Flourish |
| 2021 | "Glory I Couldn't See" | — | — | — | | Flourish |
| 2021 | "Unity Hymn" | — | — | — | | Flourish |
| 2022 | "Yeshua (Friend of Sinners)" | — | 30 | — | | non-album single |

==== Other charted songs ====
| Year | Single | Chart positions | | | Certifications | Album |
| Year | Single | US Christ | US Christ Airplay | US Christ AC | Certifications | Album |
|---|---|---|---|---|---|---|
| 2013 | "Jesus, Firm Foundation" (with Steven Curtis Chapman, Mandisa & Mark Hall) | 41 | 41 | — | | non-album single |
