= Secrets Keep You Sick =

Studio album by The Fold
- Released: May 22, 2007
- Genre: Pop punk, alternative rock, Christian rock
- Label: Tooth & Nail
- Producer: 44:15

The Fold chronology
This Too Shall Pass (2006)	Secrets Keep You Sick (2007)	Stargazer EP (2008)

Professional ratings
Review scores
Source	Rating
AllMusic	3.5/5 stars
Cross Rhythms	8/10 stars

Secrets Keep You Sick is the second studio album by the Chicago-based rock band The Fold. It was released on May 22, 2007, by Tooth and Nail Records.

== Track listing ==
1. "Medicine" – 3:06
2. "Younger Than Our Years" – 3:13
3. "Your Secrets Keep You Sick" – 3:20
4. "New Skeptic" – 3:25
5. "Faster Still" – 5:04
6. "Closer" – 3:41
7. "Down In Doubt And Living Without" – 3:47
8. "Hey Rebekah" – 4:02
9. "Catastrophe! (Prepare To Defibrillate)" – 3:17
10. "Beside You Now" – 4:18
11. "Revisited" – 4:47
- The vocal introduction of "Closer" is identical to that of "His Melody" on the band's first independent album, Not of This World, though the remainder of the song is much different.
- The song "Revisited" is a re-recorded version of the track's original appearance on Not of This World.

== Awards ==
In 2008, the album was nominated for a Dove Award for Recorded Music Packaging of the Year at the 39th GMA Dove Awards.

In 2008, Secrets Keep You Sick was nominated for a Grammy in the category of "Best Recording Package".
