= Tenth Avenue North =

American contemporary Christian band

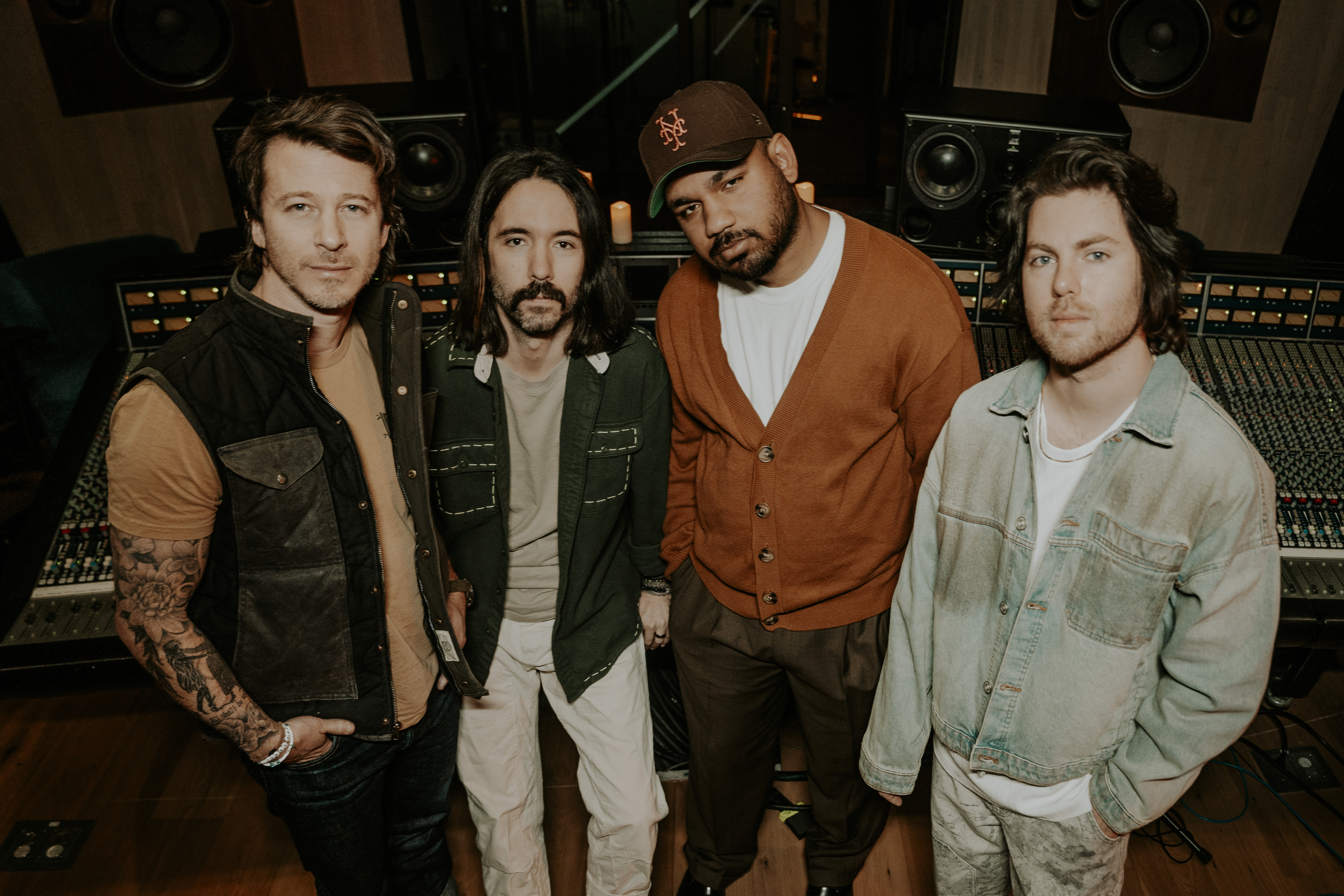
- Tenth Avenue North (left to right: Mike Donehey, Thomas Ewing, Monty Rivera, Payden Hilliard)

Background information
- Origin: West Palm Beach, Florida
- Genres: Contemporary Christian music; Christian rock; pop rock; power pop; acoustic rock; indie rock
- Years active: 2000–2021, 2023–present
- Label: Reunion
- Members: Mike Donehey; Thomas Ewing; Monty Rivera; Payden Hilliard
- Past members: Jeff Owen; Bryan Homan; Andrew Middleton; Daniel Zayas; Scott Sanders; Donnie Richards; Jason Jamison; Brendon Shirley; Ruben Juarez III
- Website: www.tenthavenuenorth.com

Tenth Avenue North is an American contemporary Christian music band from West Palm Beach, Florida. The band has released a total of fifteen original music projects, including eight full-length studio albums (six of which reached the Billboard 200, including one which reached the top 10) and multiple RIAA gold singles.

The group was formed while its founding members attended Palm Beach Atlantic University, taking its name from an east–west road in Palm Beach County. During its period of prominence, the band was composed of Mike Donehey as the lead singer, Jason Jamison as the drummer, Jeff Owen as the guitarist, Ruben Juarez as the bassist, and Brendon Shirley as the keyboardist.

In February 2020, they announced an amicable end to the band and that their upcoming tour would be their last, as the members wanted to spend more time with their families and pursue other career paths. Their final tour was halted due to the COVID-19 pandemic after a few shows, and ultimately canceled. The band decided to play a final farewell show with the five main members in Florida in April 2021 and disbanded thereafter. However, Donehey announced in November 2023 that the group had reformed with Donehey as lead singer and members Thomas Ewing and Monty Rivera, with Owen assisting the band as co-writer and producer.

== History ==
=== Founding and early success (2000–2011) ===
Tenth Avenue North was founded in 2000 by Donehey and Jamison. According to Donehey, the name Tenth Avenue North was meant to be temporary because they were scheduled to play at a conference and could not agree on a name; they chose the name of the street they lived on in West Palm Beach and never changed it.

The band released several independent albums and an EP before catching the attention of producers Jason Ingram and Phillip LaRue. Jeff Owen joined the band as guitarist before its first major label album, of which Scott Sanders was also part. Its debut album, Over and Underneath, was released on May 20, 2008, on Reunion Records, and the band began a tour near that time. The song "Love Is Here" hit the Top 20 on the U.S. Contemporary Christian Music chart, and reached No. 3 within a month. It spent 13 weeks on Billboard's Christian Songs chart, peaking at No. 3. and ending 2008 as the 12th-most-played song on Christian Hit Radio, according to R&R magazine's Christian CHR chart for the year.

The band's next single, "By Your Side", was released in late August 2008 and eventually reached No. 1 on Christian CHR radio in 2009; according to R&R's chart, it had been in that position for three weeks by February 2009. It spent 48 weeks on the Billboard Christian Songs chart, peaking at No. 2. It also won the GMA Dove Award for Song of the Year at the 41st award ceremony in April 2010. "Hold My Heart" was released as a single in 2009 and spent 44 weeks on the Christian Songs chart, peaking at No. 4.

Sanders departed the band and Juarez and Shirley joined the band in 2009, though they did not appear in promotional materials as band members yet. "Healing Begins", the first single from their next album, was released on March 2, 2010, and spent 29 weeks on the Billboard Christian Songs chart. The Light Meets The Dark, the complete album, came out on May 11, 2010.

The band won the "New Artist of the Year" award at the 40th GMA Dove Awards in April 2009.

In 2011, the band released Tenth Avenue North Live: Inside and In Between – The Shows, The Songs, The Story, a live album featuring video footage of concerts, video journals about the message behind the music, and live recordings of six of the band's biggest hits.

=== The Struggle, Cathedrals, Followers, and other projects (2012–2018) ===
In August 2012, the band released its third album, The Struggle, with "Losing" as the lead single. The album was the band's most commercially successful project, debuting at No 1 on Billboard's Rock and Christian album charts and reaching No. 9 on the Billboard 200. The Struggle used vocals recorded from audience members at shows and fans who came to live recording sessions to contribute to the album. The Struggle tour featured Rend Collective as the opening act.

In December 2012, the band released an iTunes session, which includes a cover of Ben E. King's song "Stand by Me" and some of the band's singles.

In July 2014, the band released the Islands EP and the single "No Man Is an Island".

On November 10, 2014, the band released their fourth studio album, Cathedrals, which also contained all the songs from the Islands EP. The album debuted at No. 1 Billboard Christian Music chart and No. 32 on the Billboard 200 chart.

In a 2014 interview about Cathedrals, Jamison described the band's songwriting process thusly: "Mike, our singer, is always going to be the main lyricist: he's the driving force, and he's the best at it. On pretty much every song, we'll come in and say, 'Not this line' or 'This melody – how about we change it to this?' One of the things we've learned as a band over the years is how to take criticism well. When it comes to songwriting, you have to be willing to be told no, and to work for something much better. We've all got a lot better at that; I would say on this new record it was a testament to that, where we could easily point out a melody or lyric we didn't agree with, and change it all together. Or we could come up with the concept of a verse or a chorus, and we could all pin it together; or the drumbeat doesn't work - 'We don't like this' - so we try four or five different options till we've got the right one. So everybody's part was criticized carefully - even the bass part was looked at by the drummer. We all wanted to walk away with a product where we could say, 'I love these songs, and I wouldn't do it any different'." He also said that he viewed the band's main audience as "believers who are going through difficult times, and maybe they can find refuge or answers or hope in the songs that we write as we go through those difficult times."

In May 2016, the band released "What You Want", the lead single from their fifth studio album, Followers. The new album was released on October 14, 2016. It was followed by the singles "Control (Somehow You Want Me)" and "Fighting for You", the latter of which was released on November 9.

In 2017, the band released a full-length Christmas album, Decade the Halls Vol. 1, featuring classic and original Christmas songs in the style of each decade from the 1930s to the 2010s.

In May 2018, drummer (and founding member) Jason Jamison left the band to spend more time at home with his family and took a position with the band's partner charity, Compassion International. Spencer Ford became their new touring drummer.

Also in 2018, the band launched their own record imprint on Sony, ReMade Records. The first band signed to the new imprint was Land of Color.

The band's next EP, The Things We've Been Afraid to Say, was released on October 19, 2018. Lead singer Mike Donehey said it was the band's first collection of songs of lament covering topics like "casual sex, pornography, political outrage, hatred, shame, secrets, fear and sexual abuse". The EP was released through ReMade Records.

In December 2018, Brendon Shirley, the band's keyboardist since 2010, left the band to pursue other ventures with his wife. Jeremy Gifford became the new touring keyboardist.

=== Final projects (2019–2021) ===
After the amicable departures of Jamison and Shirley, the band decided to scale back the number of shows they were playing in order to spend more time at home with their families.

In August 2019, the band released their sixth full-length album, No Shame. The band released singles "Greater Than All My Regrets", "No Shame", and "Paranoia" in the months leading up to the album's release. Donehey said the song "Greater than All My Regrets" was inspired by the realization that "while we were doing half as many shows, and still paying our bills...I was filled with regret. I could have made this decision a long time ago. I could have missed less birthday parties and less recitals,” the father of four daughters says. “I could have been there, and I was beating myself up. I really felt like I heard God just whisper in my ear, ‘Hey Mike, it’s okay. I’m greater than all your regrets.’ That song has been really helpful for me dealing with my own personal regrets.” The song featured guest vocals from Donehey's sister, Kanene Pipkin of the band The Lone Bellow. The title track also features a guest appearance from The Young Escape.

In early 2020, Donehey proposed to Juarez and Owen taking a break to spend time with his family and not touring in the fall. Juarez said he was getting ready to depart the band to pursue a full-time career in real estate, and Owen mentioned a desire to move to Florida and produce and write music full time. So in February 2020, the band announced that their upcoming "Finally Living Tour" would be their final tour before disbanding after two decades. They wrote, "After twenty years, we are all dreaming new dreams, and it’s time to encourage one another to go. Go and do all that is in our hearts to do." Due to the COVID-19 pandemic, all the concerts after March 12 were postponed and ultimately canceled.

The band released their final album, Unplugged for the People, a collection of acoustic versions of 10 of their greatest hits, in October 2020.

The band later announced that Donehey, Owen, Juarez, Shirley, and Jamison would reunite for two final farewell shows in Orlando, Florida, in April 2021. The first show featured 13 of the 15 previous Tenth Avenue North band members recounting the history of the band with songs and storytelling. The second show was the final concert for the band, signifying the end of Tenth Avenue North after 21 years. At the time of their disbanding, Donehey began a solo career; Owen began working as a music producer; Juarez pursued a career in real estate; Shirley pursued business ventures with his wife; and Jamison continued at Compassion International.

=== Return (2023–present) ===
In November 2023, Donehey announced that Tenth Avenue North had re-formed and would release a new single titled "Suddenly" on the following day, with a tour to follow in 2024. After pursuing a solo career for a few years, Donehey said he thought that the band had run its course, but his wife and former bandmates encouraged him to re-start it with new members. Ewing joined as guitarist and Rivera as keyboardist, with Payden Hilliard later joining as drummer.

They embarked on the "Invited Tour" with Natalie Layne in 2024. The new band's first album, Learning to Trust, was released in 2025.

== Charity ==
Tenth Avenue North partnered with Compassion International and encouraged other people to sponsor impoverished children through the organization, especially at their live shows.

== Members ==
Current

- Mike Donehey – lead vocals, guitar (2000–2021, 2023–present)
- Thomas Ewing – guitar, harmonica, bongos, backing vocals (2023–present)
- Monty Rivera – keyboard, bass, backing vocals (2023–present)
- Payden Hilliard - drums (2025–present, touring 2024–2025)

Former

- Jeff Owen – guitar, background vocals (2005–2021)
- Ruben Juarez III – bass guitar, keyboards, backing vocals (2009–2020)
- Brendon Shirley – keyboards (2010–2018)
- Jason Jamison – drums, bongos (2000–2018)
- Bryan Homan – bass guitar, background vocals (2000–2005)
- Andrew Middleton – electric guitar, acoustic guitar, lead vocals (2002–2006)
- Donnie Richards – hand percussion, cowbell (2002–2003)
- Daniel Zayas – electric guitar, keyboards, background vocals (2003–2006)
- Scott Sanders – bass, keyboards, background vocals (2006–2009)

Touring musicians

- Ben Backus - bass, background vocals (2024–present)

Former touring musicians

- Jeremy Gifford – guitar, keyboards, backing vocals (2018–2021)
- Spencer Ford – drums, backing vocals (2018–2021)

Timeline

== Discography ==
- Don't Look Back (2003)
- Speaking of Silence (2005)
- Over and Underneath (2008)
- The Light Meets the Dark (2010)
- The Struggle (2012)
- Cathedrals (2014)
- Followers (2016)
- Decade the Halls Vol. 1 (2017)
- No Shame (2019)
- Unplugged for the People (The Acoustic Greatest Hits) (2020)
- Learning to Trust (2025)

== Guest appearances ==
Title	Year	Other performers	Album
"Higher"	2012	Lecrae	Gravity (iTunes edition)

Mike Donehey is featured on the track "Out of My Hands" on Jars of Clay's The Shelter, released in 2010. He also contributed to the track "Through the Fire" on Hawk Nelson's 2013 album Made.

== Awards and nominations ==
GMA Dove Awards

Year	Award	Result
2009	New Artist of the Year	Won
2010	Song of the Year ("By Your Side")	Won
2010	Group of the Year	Nominated
2011	Song of the Year ("Hold My Heart")	Nominated
2011	Group of the Year	Nominated
2011	Pop/Contemporary Album of the Year (The Light Meets the Dark)	Nominated
2012	Short Form Music Video of the Year ("You Are More")	Won
2018	Song of the Year ("Control")	Nominated

We Love Awards

Year	Award	Result
2025	Music Video of the Year ("Running With You in the Dark")	Nominated
