= Diamonds (Hawk Nelson album) =

Studio album by Hawk Nelson
- Released: March 17, 2015
- Recorded: 2014–15
- Genre: Alternative rock, emo
- Length: 34:39
- Label: Fair Trade Services
- Producer: Hawk Nelson

Hawk Nelson chronology
Made (2013)	Diamonds (2015)	Miracles (2018)

Diamonds is the seventh studio album from Hawk Nelson. Fair Trade Services released the project on March 17, 2015. They Spawned six singles from the album: "Just Getting Started", "Drops In the Ocean", "Sold Out", "Live Like You're Loved" and "Diamonds".

== Singles ==
- "Just Getting Started" - October 20, 2014
- "Drops In the Ocean" - January 12, 2015
- "Sold Out" - August 1, 2015
- "Diamonds" - February 22, 2016
- "Live Like You're Loved" - September 26, 2016

== Critical reception ==
Professional ratings
Review scores
Source	Rating
About.com	4/5 stars
CCM Magazine	4/5 stars
Christian Music Review	2.5/5
Christian Review Magazine	5/5 stars
CM Addict	3/5 stars
Cross Rhythms	8/10 squares
HM Magazine	3.5/5 stars
Jesus Freak Hideout	3.5/5 stars 3/5 stars
Jesus Wired	8.5/10 stars
New Release Tuesday	3.5/5 stars

Signaling in a three and a half star review by Jesus Freak Hideout, Alex Caldwell recognizes, "With a few mis-steps aside, Diamonds serves up a meal that is hearty, well made and worth your time to hear." Sarah Fine, indicating in a three and a half star review from New Release Tuesday, realizes, "what Diamonds lacks in diversity, it more than makes up for in heart, and at the end of the day, that's what this band has always been about." Awarding the album an eight out of ten for Cross Rhythms, Philip Laing states, "In 'Diamonds' we hear Steingard leading Hawk Nelson into a new season of pop and rock genre crossing."

Specifying in a four star review from CCM Magazine, Matt Conner reports, "Music fans of all ages just being introduced to the band affectionately known as Hawk will find Diamonds as an extremely easy entry point, while its pop sensibilities yet sophisticated song crafting will appeal to their lifelong fans. Hedge your bets on Diamonds to be among the year's bigger successes." Ben Rickaby, mentioning in a three and a half star review for HM Magazine, responds, "While the album may be a little too radio friendly for my taste it doesn’t change the fact that it’s an amazingly positive and fun album to listen to." Giving the album four stars at About.com, Kim Jones states, "Diamonds has a joy that is contagious."

Brianne Bellomy, awarding the album three stars for CMA Addict, writes, "this album for me isn't just quite there yet." Rating the album a 2.5 out of five at Christian Music Review, April Covington says, "artistic development a little lacking." Writing a review for Christian Review Magazine, Leah St. John rating the album five stars, states, "Diamonds is [a] fantastic album". Stephanie Crail, giving the album eight and a half stars at Jesus Wired, describes, "this record is very successful at reminding believers of our purpose and challenging us to live boldly."

One of the songs off the album, Just Getting Started, was featured in the opening sequence of Smosh: The Movie, directed by Alex Winter.

== Track listing ==
No.	Title	Writer(s)	Length
1.	"Diamonds"	Jon Steingard, Jason Ingram, Matt Bronleewe	3:03
2.	"Drops in the Ocean"	Jason Ingram, Jonathan Steingard, Matt Bronleewe	3:24
3.	"Just Getting Started"	Jordan Mohilowski, Jonathan Steingard, Sam Tinnesz	3:22
4.	"Live Like You're Loved"	Jon Steingard, Ben Glover, David Garcia	3:48
5.	"Sold Out"	Jon Steingard	3:35
6.	"Thank God for Something"	Jon Steingard, Seth Mosley, Michael Farren	3:25
7.	"Count on You"	Justin Ebach, Jonathan Steingard, Sam Tinnesz	3:00
8.	"Made to Live"	Jon Steingard, Seth Mosley, Phillip LaRue	3:19
9.	"Straight Line"	Jon Steingard	3:18
10.	"Only You"	Jon Steingard, Micah Kupier	4:45
Total length:			34:39

== Charts ==
Chart (2015)	Peak position
US Christian Albums (Billboard)	12
