= The Struggle (Tenth Avenue North album) =

Studio album by Tenth Avenue North
- Released: August 21, 2012
- Studios: Blackbird Studios and The Smoakstack (Nashville, Tennessee)
- Genres: Contemporary Christian music, pop rock
- Length: 50:44
- Label: Reunion
- Producer: Jason Ingram

Tenth Avenue North chronology
The Light Meets the Dark (2010)	The Struggle (2012)	iTunes Session - EP (2012)

Singles from The Struggle
- 1. "Losing" Released: May 18, 2012; 2. "Worn"; 3. "The Struggle"

The Struggle is the third studio album from the American Christian pop-rock band Tenth Avenue North. It was released on August 21, 2012 and reached No. 1 on Billboard's Christian and rock charts. It has received significant critical acclaim.

== Background and development ==
The band announced in 2011 that they were developing a new album. The working title of the album was "Strangers Here". The band eventually decided to title the album The Struggle, and in March 2012 publicly announced the final title and an expected release in August 2012. In 2011, the band hosted several "sing on our record" events across the country, where fans were invited to sing simple harmonies as a choir that could be used on the album.

Lead vocalist Mike Donehey said, "Our desire for The Struggle is that listeners will walk away with both of these truths still ringing in their ears and burning in their hearts. We are free to fail because there’s an ocean of grace that we fall into. But also, we have the promise of a power so strong that it raised Christ Himself, and so we know that, mystery of mysteries, we’re also not struggling to be free."

The first single from the album, "Losing, was originally demoed under the titles "Feels Like Losing" and then "Losing (God Is Not an Elephant)" (the band released a video prior to finalizing the song explaining how the forgiveness theme in the song relates to the saying that an elephant never forgets). It was eventually released as simply "Losing" on May 18, 2012. The song is an anthem about forgiveness. It is currently charting on Billboard's Christian Songs chart, peaking at No. 2.

The cover for the album is the title set against Rembrandt's 1633 painting The Storm on the Sea of Galilee, which shows 14 people, though the actual event was Jesus and his 12 disciples (13 people). It is believed that the fourteenth person is Rembrandt, and that he painted himself in with the terrified twelve disciples to show that Biblical stories apply to everyone.

== Critical reception ==
Professional ratings
Review scores
Source	Rating
AllMusic	4/5 stars
CCM Magazine	3/5 stars
Christian Broadcasting Network	3/5 spins
Christian Music Zine	4.75/5
Christianity Today	4/5 stars
Cross Rhythms	9/10 stars
Indie Vision Music	4/5 stars
Jesus Freak Hideout	3.5/5 stars
Louder Than The Music	4/5 stars
New Release Tuesday	4.5/5 stars
The Phantom Tollbooth	3.5/5 stars
Worship Leader	4/5 stars

The Struggle received positive reviews from critics. AllMusic's Steve Leggett noted how "This set was road-tested live, with the band urging audience members to sing along on the choruses, and those varied audience contributions are actually here on the record, a sort of massed fan choir for the band. The result is Tenth Avenue North's best release yet."

CCM Magazine's Andy Argyrakis gave credence to the fact of the band "had no trouble connecting with Christian music's masses" with respect to this album. In addition, Argyrakis said the band "encourage[s] listeners to persevere through life's storms for ultimate freedom in Christ."

Christian Music Zine's Emily Kjonaas praised the album, and the track "Worn" specifically for its relatable theme of being worn out dealing with hectic lives. Kjonaas concluded, "Tenth Avenue North continues to get better and better with each record they put out. Overall, The Struggle is an album that appeals to not only Tenth Avenue North fans but people out there who are looking for a great worship album."

Christianity Today's Robert Ham described The Struggle as Tenth Avenue North's "strongest album to date", writing, "These songs of struggle and redemption are melodically complex, often beautiful (much credit should be given to keyboardist Brendon Shirley on that front), and spiritually rich. It's a tough balance for any band to maintain, but Tenth Avenue North manages it with ease and grace."

Cross Rhythms' Tony Cummings wrote that with "their fourth full length album, shows they've lost none of their winning ways with memorable pop rock hooks."

Indie Vision Music's Jonathan Andre said the album was "full of lyrical goodness" and gives "a reason to long for our permanent home in the midst of living now with Christ by our side throughout our hurt we may endure in our earthly lives." It continued, "Musical ingeniousness coupled with lyrical transparency and hopeful motivation permeates through each track" and said the album was "full of eclectic musical sounds weaved through lyrical moments of surrender and adoration." It concluded that the band has "written 12 poetic tapestries of honesty as we revel in the knowledge that our struggles are temporary."

Jesus Freak Hideout's Roger Gelwicks gave the album a positive review, saying it had "an extra level of mastery" compared to the band's previous two albums and calling it "definitely one of the highlight releases of the summer." However, he lamented that the album did not maximize what it sees as the band's full potential: "There's a masterpiece brimming with resounding interest from Tenth Avenue North that has yet to be found." He concluded, "The Struggle succeeds in encouraging any Christian in their walk, no matter how much they stray from the path of righteousness: 'Hallelujah, we are free to struggle/we're not struggling to be free.' Hallelujah, indeed!"

Jesus Freak Hideout's Cortney Warner said the album "is even more mellow and soft compared to their previous two albums" and "is definitely one of the highlight releases of the summer."

Louder Than The Music's Jono Davies praised the album's "strong songs and big melodic choruses" and said the first track, "Shadows", sounded a bit like Snow Patrol.

New Release Tuesday's Kevin Davis wrote that the album "is a great collection of confessional and authentic expressions of faith. It appears that the success of the band has allowed them to creatively express themselves and for me that has really paid off with yet another 'best' album. The album’s themes are brokenness, healing, forgiveness and mercy. Once again the songs are poignant and powerful, and in recording the new tunes, the band brings a more seasoned level of musicianship and intensity, on par with Coldplay, Hillsong UNITED and Jars of Clay." Lastly, Davis said that "with one listen to this album it is obvious Tenth Avenue North is taking another bold step forward on their musical journey."

The Phantom Tollbooth's Bert Gangl was more critical, when he stated "The main sticking point, though, is that, over the course of the second half of Struggle, the songs begin to lose a good bit of steam and ultimately wind up blending together in an overly like-sounding mass. That being said, even in spite of its flagging energy and overly homogenous [sic] latter portion, the latest release is still a more cohesive final product, taken as a whole, than the sophomore effort. Both albums pale, though, next to the far more solid freshman project, which still remains the TAN collective's most convincing artistic statement and, consequently, the best place for the uninitiated to begin their investigation of the band."

Christian Broadcasting Network's Chris Carpenter wrote, "[the] album features several radio friendly songs including the debut single 'Losing' but something gets lost in translation. Thematically, The Struggle explores the challenges of life and how God's grace consistently delivers us from the depths of despair. Frontman Mike Donehy, an emerging voice in contemporary Christian music, has crafted a set of lyrics that are powerful and strong but sometimes feel disconnected from the musical arrangement. Perhaps the addition of two new band members into the creative mix finds them in a transitional period of sorts that is reflected on this record. … [T]he lyrics are strong, the music is well crafted, but it just does not come together in the end."

Worship Leader's Jason Whitehorn wrote that "the sounds resonating from Tenth Avenue North’s third album are an easy movement from one track to another of emotional delight. Albeit easy on the ears, the lyrics are a sincere look at the challenges in life we face—and the freedom we already have obtained to negotiate them through Christ."

Crosswalk.com said the album "wrestles with the human condition and hungers for a permanent spiritual home." It praised the album for maintaining a successful U2 and Jars of Clay-esque sound while standing apart with "creative songwriting shapes and quickly evident lyrical strengths." It said "Shadows" and the title track were compelling alternative rock songs with worship codas. It said "Losing" is "the biggest winner, a rock gospel stomp with an inspired break-it-down bridge where the combination of triangle, hand clapping, and piano has never sounded cooler." It concluded, "The Struggle is the sound of Tenth Avenue North hitting its creative stride. Don’t let the project’s heavy premise discourage you from listening; this band is a bright spot in modern Christian music."

== The Struggle Tour ==
In June 2012, the band announced The Struggle Tour, featuring guests Audrey Assad and Rend Collective Experiment. It began in September 2012 and ran through November 2012 to more than three dozen cities.

== Track listing ==
Album track order
No.	Title	Writer(s)	Length
1.	"Shadows"	Mike Donehey, Jason Jamison, Jeff Owen, Brendon Shirley, Ruben Juarez	4:27
2.	"The Struggle"	Donehey, Jamison, Owen, Shirley, Juarez	4:28
3.	"Worn"	Donehey, Owen, Jason Ingram	4:04
4.	"Losing"	Donehey, Owen, Juarez	3:32
5.	"Don't Stop the Madness"	Donehey, Jamison, Owen, Shirley, Juarez	4:42
6.	"Where Life Will Never Die"	Donehey, Jamison, Owen, Shirley, Juarez	3:44
7.	"Strangers Here"	Donehey, Ben Glover	3:33
8.	"Grace"	Donehey, Jamison, Owen, Shirley, Juarez, AJ Cheek	3:35
9.	"All the Same"	Donehey, Owen, Ingram	4:48
10.	"Hostage of Peace"	Donehey, Jamison, Owen, Shirley, Juarez	4:22
11.	"You Do All Things Well"	Donehey, Shirley	4:42
12.	"Lamb of God"	Donehey, Shirley	4:47
Total length:			50:44

== Personnel ==
Tenth Avenue North

- Mike Donehey – vocals, acoustic guitars
- Brendon Shirley – keyboards, backing vocals
- Jeff Owen – electric guitars, backing vocals
- Ruben Juarez – bass, backing vocals
- Jason Jamison – drums

Additional musicians

- Jason Ingram – programming, backing vocals
- Jonathan Smith – programming
- Drew Fremder – trumpet
- John Catchings – cello
- Chris Carmichael – string quartet, string arrangements
- Moriah Peters – backing vocals
- Multiple choir singers on "Losing"

=== Production ===
- Terry Hemmings – executive producer
- Jordyn Thomas – A&R
- Jason Ingram – producer
- Shane D. Wilson – engineer, mixing
- Lani Crump – mix coordinator, production coordinator
- Jonathan Smith – editing, production assistant
- Michelle Box – A&R production
- Dave Steunebrink – production coordinator, management
- Beth Lee – art direction
- Tim Parker – art direction, design
- Parker Young – photography
- Samantha Roe – wardrobe
- Kristopher Whipple – grooming

== Music videos ==
- "Losing"
- "Worn"

== Charts ==
=== Weekly charts ===
Chart (2012)	Peak position
US Top Christian Albums (Billboard)	1
US Billboard 200	9
US Top Rock Albums (Billboard)	1
