= The Fold =

American band

- Origin: Chicago, Illinois, United States
- Genres: Alternative rock; pop punk; indie rock; Christian rock
- Years active: 2002–present
- Labels: Tooth & Nail (2005–2008); Independent (2002–2004), (2008–present)
- Website: thefoldrock.com

The Fold is an American indie rock band from Chicago, Illinois, United States. The Fold formed in 2002, and promptly began work on their album This Too Shall Pass for Tooth & Nail Records. They have released five full-length studio albums and three EP's over their career, with a sixth full-length slated for release in late 2026, titled Good luck or Destiny. Career highlights include surpassing 130 million views on their YouTube channel and the nomination of Secrets Keep You Sick for a Grammy in the category of "Best Recording Package". Their single "Gravity" from the album This Too Shall Pass reached No. 1 on the CHR Rock charts. The band has also written themed music for sports and television, most notably the theme songs for Ninjago: Masters of Spinjitzu, the Chicago Cubs, and all NFL teams.

== History ==
Their debut album Not Of This World was released 2003. This Too Shall Pass was their second album released on February 22, 2006, on Tooth & Nail Records. The follow-up Secrets Keep You Sick was released May 22, 2007. Secrets Keep You Sick was nominated for a Grammy under the "Best Recording Package" category, but the band lost to Cassadaga by Bright Eyes. Directly following the release of Secrets, the band spent their summer on the Vans Warped Tour. The Fold played alongside friends Plain White T's and The Spill Canvas on their own dollar to support their 2008 sold-out UK tour. Upon returning to the U.S., The Fold parted ways with Tooth & Nail, and completed their fourth studio album Dear Future, Come Get Me with Zack and Kenneth (Cartel, All Time Low, Mayday Parade), who also recorded Secrets Keep You Sick.

In December 2009, the band released a self-shot music video for "Every Band in the USA", a parody of the Miley Cyrus hit "Party in the U.S.A.". The video has been viewed on YouTube nearly 500,000 times. On June 29, 2010, the band released a video for the song "Neverender" of Dear Future, Come Get Me. The video was filmed at Willowbrook High School, the former high school of frontman Dan Castady and also of Tom Higgenson, the lead singer of the Plain White T's.

In November 2010, The Fold released the song "This Christmas" on iTunes, along with two unofficial, self made videos. One of which featured all of the best crowd reactions from Oprah's Ultimate Favorite Things, 2010. The video can be seen here on their YouTube channel.

In January 2011, the band recorded a song titled "The Weekend Whip", the theme song for the Lego Ninjago: Masters of Spinjitzu television series. The band announced in early 2012 that they would release a full EP of ninja-themed pop rock songs aimed at the Ninjago demographic; rolling it out a single at a time via digital outlets, and then completing the process in late Summer 2012 with a full EP release, along with karaoke sing-a-long versions, and various other exclusive content entitled "For The Spinners".

In 2012, The Fold wrote and released "Let's Go Cubbies" which was adopted as the official song of the Chicago Cubs. It continues to be played during every Cubs broadcast on WGN Radio 720AM. The Fold performed live at Wrigley Field on opening day April 5, 2012.

The Fold's fifth album, Moving Past, was co-produced by the band and Sean O'Keefe, and mixed by J.R. McNeely. The album came out October 15, 2013.

In 2016, The Fold was tasked with writing more music for the Cubs, including a song called "Let The Games Begin", which they played at Opening Day at Wrigley Field, and again at the final rally before the post-season. The Cubs went all the way and won the World Series that year, the first time in 108 years.

The Fold continue to write and record music in 2017, mostly for LEGO Ninjago, but there has been talk of late of a new full-length album.

In the season 9 finale of Ninjago: Masters of Spinjitzu, The Fold appear as LEGO Minifigures to congratulate the Ninja for defeating Lord Garmadon. Appearing as characters from the show, as they sing "The Weekend Whip." Also in a short of Season 10 named "The Weekend Drill", they appeared as inmates in Prison.

"The Weekly Whip" is a series on YouTube, bringing new Episode every week starting 2 August with Episode "Arcadian Whip lost title + artwork".

On November 13, 2020, The Fold released a single titled “Young & Free”. It was their first song unrelated to Ninjago in over seven years. The following year on April 16, 2021, The Fold released another single titled “World Gone Mad”.

On September 9, 2022, The Fold released their latest album Stereo Fire, which included the two previously released singles, "Young and Free" and "World Gone Mad". The album also contains 12 additional songs, including a remix of "Young and Free" by Alexander Wakim.

On September 14, 2026, The Fold officially released their 2004 EP, Rarities on all streaming platforms. This was followed by the official streaming releases of their 2002 EP titled Feeling Like a Failure Now, on September 15, and their 2003 album titled Not of This World, on September 17.

== Touring ==
The Fold has played over 500 shows since 2002 and toured non-stop in 2009.

- SXSW 2010
- Warped Tour 2011
- Wrigley Field 2012

=== Current members ===
- Daniel Castady – Lead Vocals, Rhythm Guitar
- George Castady – Lead Guitar, Backing and Lead Vocals
- Matt Pittman – Bass, Backing and Lead Vocals
- Nate Burgard – Drums, Percussion

=== Former members ===
- Mark Rhoades – Drums, Percussion
- Mike Emmons/Stanzione – Drums
- Aaron Green — Lead Guitar
- Austin Marshall — Drums, Percussion
- Keith Mochel — Bass

=== Unofficial (former) members ===
- Joseph Martin - creator of "5 best friends" series on YouTube

== Discography ==
=== Studio albums ===
- Not of This World - independent release (2003)
- This Too Shall Pass - Tooth & Nail Records (2006)
- Secrets Keep You Sick - Tooth & Nail Records (2007)
- Dear Future, Come Get Me - independent release (2009)
- Moving Past - independent release (2013)
- Stereo Fire - independent release (2022)

=== Compilations ===
- For the Spinners, Vol. 1 - JAM Music Company (2012)

=== EPs ===
- Feeling Like Failure Now (EP) - independent release (2002)
- Rarities EP - independent release (2004)
- Stargazer EP - Tooth & Nail Records (2008)

=== Singles ===
- "Neverender" - independent release (2009)
- "This Christmas" - independent release (2010)
- "Can't Stop Twitterin'" (Weezer parody) - independent release (2011)
- "Every Band in the USA" (Miley Cyrus parody) - independent release (2011)
- "Let's Go Cubbies" - independent release (2012)
- "Young & Free" - independent release (2020)
- "World Gone Mad" - independent release (2021)
- "Behind Us Now" - independent release (2022)
- "The Hallowhip" - independent release (2023)

=== Ninjago: Masters of Spinjitzu soundtrack ===
==== Vol. 1 - Masters of Spinjitzu - Seasons 1–2 ====
- The Weekend Whip (2011)
- Born To Be a Ninja (2012)
- Ninja Go! (2012)
- A-W-E-S-O-M-E (2012)

==== Vol. 2 - Rebooted - Season 3 ====
- The Weekend Whip (Michael AM Remix) (2014)
- After the Blackout (2014)
- Full Digital (2014)
- We Are Ninja (2014)
- Spinnin' Out in Color (2014)
- Eye of The Storm (2014)
- Digital Love (July 2020)

==== Vol. 3 - The Tournament of Elements - Season 4 ====
- The Weekend Whip (The Anacondrai Remix) (2015)
- The Ninja Roll (2015)
- Back To Ninjago (2015)
- Enter The Tournament (2015)
- 21st Century Ninja (2015)
- 21st Century Ninja: Demo (2020)

==== Vol. 4 - Possession/Skybound - Season 5–6 ====
- The Ghost Whip - from Possession (2015)
- The Pirate Whip - from Skybound (2016)
- Bring On The Pirates - from Skybound (2016)
- We Are Ninjago - from Skybound (2016)
- We Are Ninjago: The Lost Verse - from Skybound (2020)
- The Pirate Whip (Demo) - from Skybound (December 2020)

==== Vol. 5 - Day of the Departed - 2016 Halloween Special ====
- The Rift Whip (2016)
- Close the Circle (2016)
- Day of the Departed (2016)

==== Vol. 6 - Hands of Time - Season 7 ====
- The Temporal Whip (2017)
- The Time is Now! (2017)
- Rise of the Vermillion (2017)

==== All Ages: Lego Ninjago: Masters of Spinjitzu: The Complete Ninjago Discography of The Fold ====
- A full-length album that includes all The Fold songs of the TV show from Season 1 to Season 7, as a result of the little break the band has until the new music release for Season 11

==== Vol 7. - Secrets of the Forbidden Spinjitzu/Prime Empire - Season 11-12 ====
- The Wicked Whip - from Secrets of the Forbidden Spinjitzu (July 2019)
- The Miracle Whip - from Secrets of the Forbidden Spinjitzu (November 2019)
- The Arcadian Whip - from Prime Empire (March 2020)

==== Vol 8. - Master of the Mountain - Season 13 ====
- The Shintaro Dungeon Whip (July 2020)
- The Dungeon Whip (Demo) (November 2020)
- The Christmas Whip (December 2020)

==== Ninjago 10 Anniversary Soundtrack ====
- Ten For Ninjago (June 2021)
- Weekend Whips (2011 - 2020)

==== Vol 9. - Crystalized - Season 15 ====
- The Crystalized Whip (October 2023)

=== The LEGO Ninjago Movie Soundtrack ===
- The Weekend Whip Re-mastered (2017)

== Filmography ==
The Fold, in minifigure form, appeared in the episodes "Green Destiny" and "The Weekend Drill" from Ninjago: Masters of Spinjitzu. Their songs are often heard as instrumentals in the series.
