= Letters to the President =

Studio album by Hawk Nelson
- Released: July 13, 2004
- Genre: Pop punk, skate punk, punk rock
- Length: 39:50
- Label: Tooth & Nail
- Producer: Aaron Sprinkle; Trevor McNevan

Hawk Nelson chronology
Letters to the President (2004)	Smile, It's The End of the World (2006)

Alternative cover
- Enhanced Edition Cover

Professional ratings
Review scores
Source	Rating
AllMusic	3.5/5 stars
Jesus Freak Hideout	4/5 stars

Letters to the President is the debut studio album released by Christian pop punk band Hawk Nelson. The album was released on July 13, 2004. It was later re-released on October 4, 2005 with six additional tracks and three exclusive videos.

== Track listing ==
All tracks are written by Daniel Biro, Jason Dunn, David Clark, Matthew Paige and Trevor McNevan except where noted

Album release
No.	Title	Writer(s)	Length
1.	"California"		2:52
2.	"Things We Go Through"		2:31
3.	"Every Little Thing"		3:07
4.	"From Underneath"		2:45
5.	"Letters to the President"		3:13
6.	"Right Here"		3:11
7.	"Recess"		0:50
8.	"Take Me"		3:30
9.	"Someone Else Before"		3:17
10.	"First Time"		2:37
11.	"Like a Racecar" (featuring Trevor McNevan of TFK)		2:48
12.	"Late Show"		1:53
13.	"36 Days"	Daniel Biro, Jason Dunn, David Clark, Matthew Paige	3:42
14.	"Long and Lonely Road"		3:10

All tracks are written by Daniel Biro, Jason Dunn, David Clark, Matthew Paige and Trevor McNevan except where noted

Special Edition bonus tracks
No.	Title	Writer(s)	Length
15.	"American Dreams: The Story"		0:34
16.	"My Generation" (The Who cover)	Pete Townshend	3:28
17.	"Every Little Thing" (Acoustic)		3:08
18.	"Take Me" (Acoustic)		3:28
19.	"Jason's Thoughts in French"		0:39
20.	"Letters to the President" (Acoustic)		4:33
Total length:			54:33

== Personnel ==
Hawk Nelson

- Jason Dunn — vocals, rhythm guitar
- Daniel Biro — bass
- Dave Clark — lead guitar
- Matt Paige — drums

Additional musicians

- Jonathan Dunn — vocals on "Someone Else Before"
- Autumn Clark — vocals on "Someone Else Before"
- Trevor McNevan — vocals on "Like a Racecar"

Production

- Trevor McNevan — producer
- Aaron Sprinkle — producer
- J.R. McNeely — mixer
- Brandon Ebel — executive producer
