= Hawk Nelson =

Canadian Christian rock band

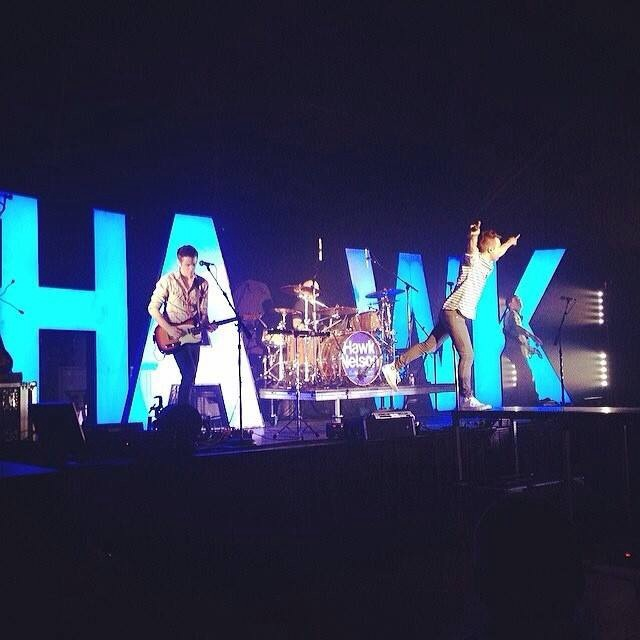
- Hawk Nelson performing on the We Won't Be Shaken tour in 2014 With Micah Kuiper (Left), Justin Benner (Middle), Jonathan Steingard (Middle), and Daniel Biro (Right)

Background information
- Also known as: SWISH, Reason Being
- Origin: Peterborough, Ontario, Canada
- Genres: Pop punk, Christian rock, pop rock
- Years active: 2000–2020
- Labels: Tooth & Nail, BEC, Fair Trade Services, Paperproof Recordings
- Past members: Daniel Biro; Jason Dunn; Justin Benner; David "Davin" Clark; Matt "Matty" Paige; Jonathan Steingard; Aaron "Skwid" Tosti; Gideon Courtney; Micah Kuiper; David Niacaris
- Website: hawknelson.com

Hawk Nelson was a Canadian Christian rock band from Peterborough, Ontario. Formed in 2000, the band released eight studio albums. Bassist/backing vocalist Daniel Biro was the band's only founding member to remain throughout their entire history.

== History ==
=== Early independent releases (2000–2003) ===
In 2000, Dunn, Clark, and Paige founded a Peterborough-based group called "SWISH", while Biro sang lead vocals for a four-piece group called the "Cheese Monkeys from Planet Nine" from Barrie, Ontario. In 2000, SWISH released their first independent album, Riding Around the Park on Mime Radio, an independent record label based in Peterborough. In January 2002, Biro moved to Peterborough to join Dunn, Clark, and Paige and SWISH was renamed "Reason Being", before finally settling with the name "Hawk Nelson". In 2003, they released their second independent album, Saturday Rock Action.

=== Letters to the President (2004–2005) ===
They continued to perform and tour independently in Ontario, Canada, before being signed with Tooth & Nail Records, largely on the recommendation of Trevor McNevan, the lead singer of fellow Tooth & Nail bands Thousand Foot Krutch and FM Static. McNevan, also from Peterborough, Ontario, is credited with discovering the band. In July 2004, Hawk Nelson released their debut album Letters to the President. It was produced by Aaron Sprinkle and McNevan, who also co-wrote the album's fourteen songs. He has also appeared on some of the band's songs, as well as in their video for the song "California".

Popular with Christian rock fans, the band has achieved some success in the mainstream as well. They portrayed The Who on an episode of the NBC drama American Dreams, and they recorded a song named "Bring 'Em Out" as the theme for the 2005 motion picture Yours, Mine and Ours featuring Drake Bell. This song and another hit song "The Show" were both used on Sunday Night Football commercials. "Things We Go Through" from Letters to the President was also featured in Yours, Mine and Ours.

In October 2005, the band re-released Letters to the President, with new material including their cover of The Who's "My Generation", three acoustic versions of some of their hits, and a limited edition cover. Hawk Nelson plays the party band for the film Yours, Mine and Ours (2005). On December 20, 2005, Hawk Nelson released an extended play titled Bring 'Em Out.

=== Smile, It's the End of the World (2006–2007) ===
Hawk Nelson continued to gain popularity and was voted "Favorite New Artist" by CCM Magazine in their February 2006 Reader's Choice Awards.

On April 4, 2006, Hawk Nelson released Connect Sets with six acoustic tracks, including "Bring Em' Out", "Thing We Go Through", and "California".

The band released their second studio album, Smile, It's the End of the World, on April 4, 2006. The album was also co-written by Trevor McNevan of Thousand Foot Krutch. The album won a GMA Canada Covenant Award for "Modern Rock/Alternative Album of the Year" in 2006. The album's first single, "Everything You Ever Wanted", went on to hit No. 1 for 9 weeks on the R&R Christian CHR chart, and was the fourth most-played song of 2006. The band spent the middle of 2006 touring the major Christian music festivals, and also took part in Jeremy Camp's Beyond Measure tour. Hawk Nelson released a three-track Christmas extended play titled Gloria on November 21, 2006, and then toured with TobyMac's Winter Wonder Slam tour along with The Afters, Family Force 5, and Ayiesha Woods.

Bulletproof Records and producer Ralph Sall have assembled the compilation Charlotte's Web: Music Inspired By The Motion Picture featuring music by Christian artists including Hawk Nelson, Amy Grant, Selah, and Billy Ray Cyrus, which was released December 12, 2006. In addition, Bob Carlisle, Leigh Nash (Sixpence None The Richer), and The Send have all contributed exclusive tracks.

Hawk Nelson performed in 2006 on the Fringe Stage at Creation Festival Northwest, then again on the main stage at Creation in 2007. They performed sometime between July 25–28, 2007, at Creation Festival Northwest on the Main Stage, and they played again on the Fringe Stage at Creation Festival Northeast sometime between June 27–30, 2007. In 2007, (and again in 2009), Hawk Nelson performed at Winter Jam with a variety of other Christian bands, including Newsong, Jeremy Camp, Steven Curtis Chapman, Sanctus Real, and Britt Nicole. Hawk Nelson also toured with MxPx, Run Kid Run, Project 86, The Fold, and The Classic Crime on the Tooth and Nail Tour.

On March 27, 2007, Hawk Nelson released a "Double Take" which includes selections from Letters to the President and Smile It's the End of the World. They then released a holiday-themed extended play titled Holiday Trio on November 20, 2007.

In 2007, Aaron Tosti left the band to pursue other musical ventures and was replaced by Justin Benner.

=== Hawk Nelson Is My Friend and Live Life Loud (2008–2010) ===
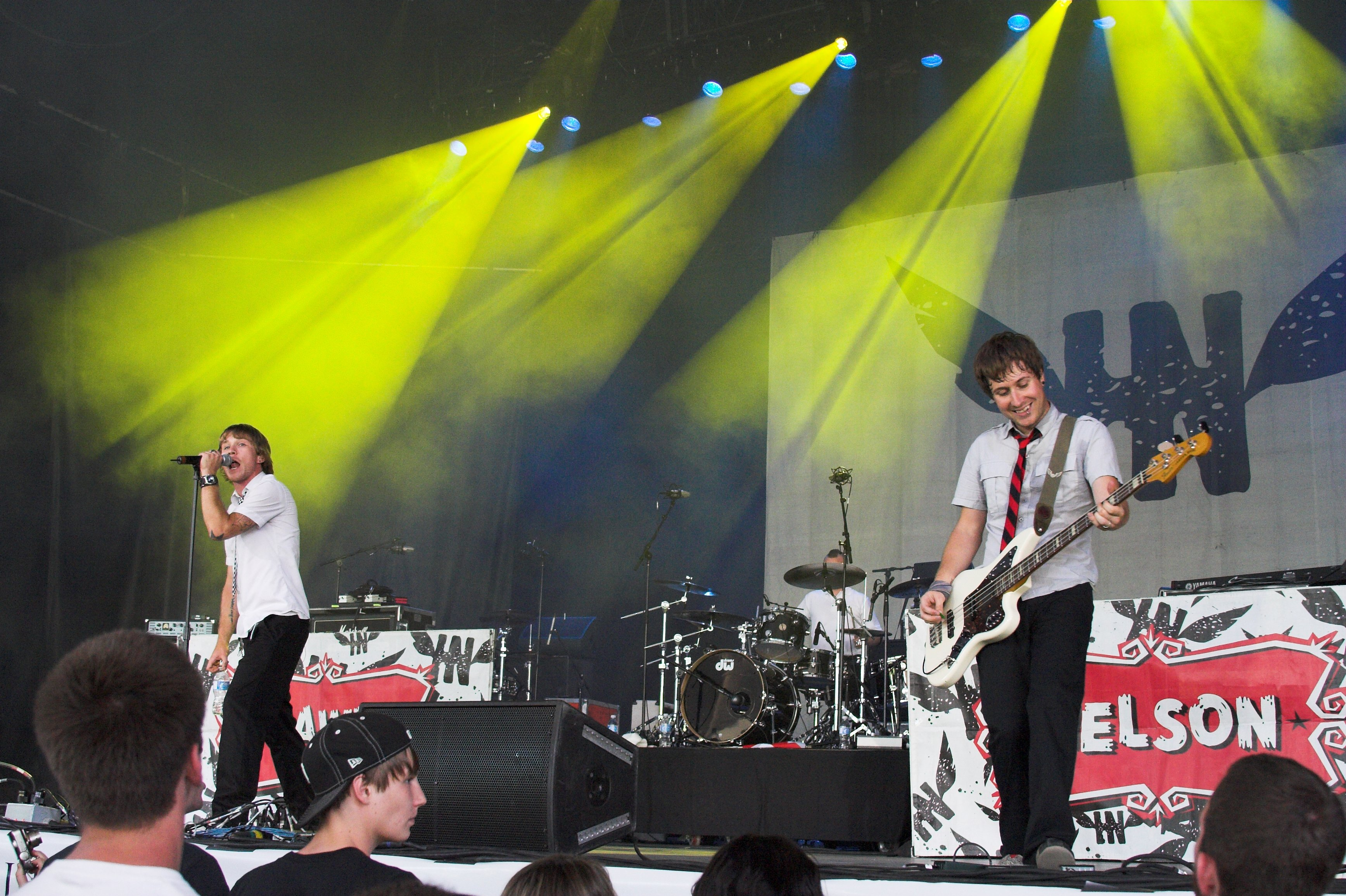
Hawk Nelson performing at Wonder Jam 2009

The band's third full album, Hawk Nelson Is My Friend was released on April 1, 2008, and featured songs co-written by Trevor McNevan of Thousand Foot Krutch, Raine Maida of Our Lady Peace and Richard Marx.

In 2008, the band also contributed a cover of "Don't You (Forget About Me)", originally by Simple Minds, off the Don't You Forget About Me: The Covers. The song was also featured in back-to-school commercials for J.C. Penney. On June 8, 2010, Hawkology: Anothology of Hawk Nelson was released containing three previously released albums: Letters to the President, Smile, It's the End of the World, and Hawk Nelson Is My Friend. On June 16, 2009, Summer was released through digital outlets only.

In January 2008, the band headlined their own tour that they called "The Green T Tour" which also featured Capital Lights and Run Kid Run.

Hawk Nelson was nominated for a 2009 Grammy Award in the category for Best Recording Package, for their 2008 album Hawk Nelson Is My Friend.

On July 21, 2009, Hawk Nelson released their second single from their fourth album Live Life Loud called "The Meaning of Life", and on August 8, the song "Alive" began to be played on Christian Radio. They released their fourth album, Live Life Loud on September 22, 2009. The title song "Live Life Loud" was made available in the Rock Band store during the first week of April 2010. The song "Live Life Loud" was featured in the trailer for the movie, "Diary of a Wimpy Kid 2: Rodrick Rules".

=== Crazy Love and departure of Jason Dunn (2011–2012) ===
On February 8, 2011, Hawk Nelson released their fifth studio album titled Crazy Love, which was bundled together with a new acoustic extended play titled The Light Sides.

Hawk Nelson released another Christmas extended play, titled Christmas on November 1, 2011, and it included the songs "Hark the Herald Angels Sing", "The Wassail Song", and "Up on the Housetop". On March 27, 2012, Hawk Nelson released a compilation album titled The Songs You've Already Heard: Best of Hawk Nelson.

On February 1, 2012, lead vocalist Jason Dunn announced he would be leaving the band in order to pursue his solo project, Lights Go Down, recording an album tentatively titled Abandon Progress. On March 11, 2012, in Fresno, California, Dunn performed his final US show with Hawk Nelson.

Following Dunn's departure, guitarist Jonathan Steingard took over as lead vocalist and bassist Daniel Biro became the last remaining original member of the band.

=== Post-Dunn releases, Steingard's renouncement of faith and departure (2012–2020) ===
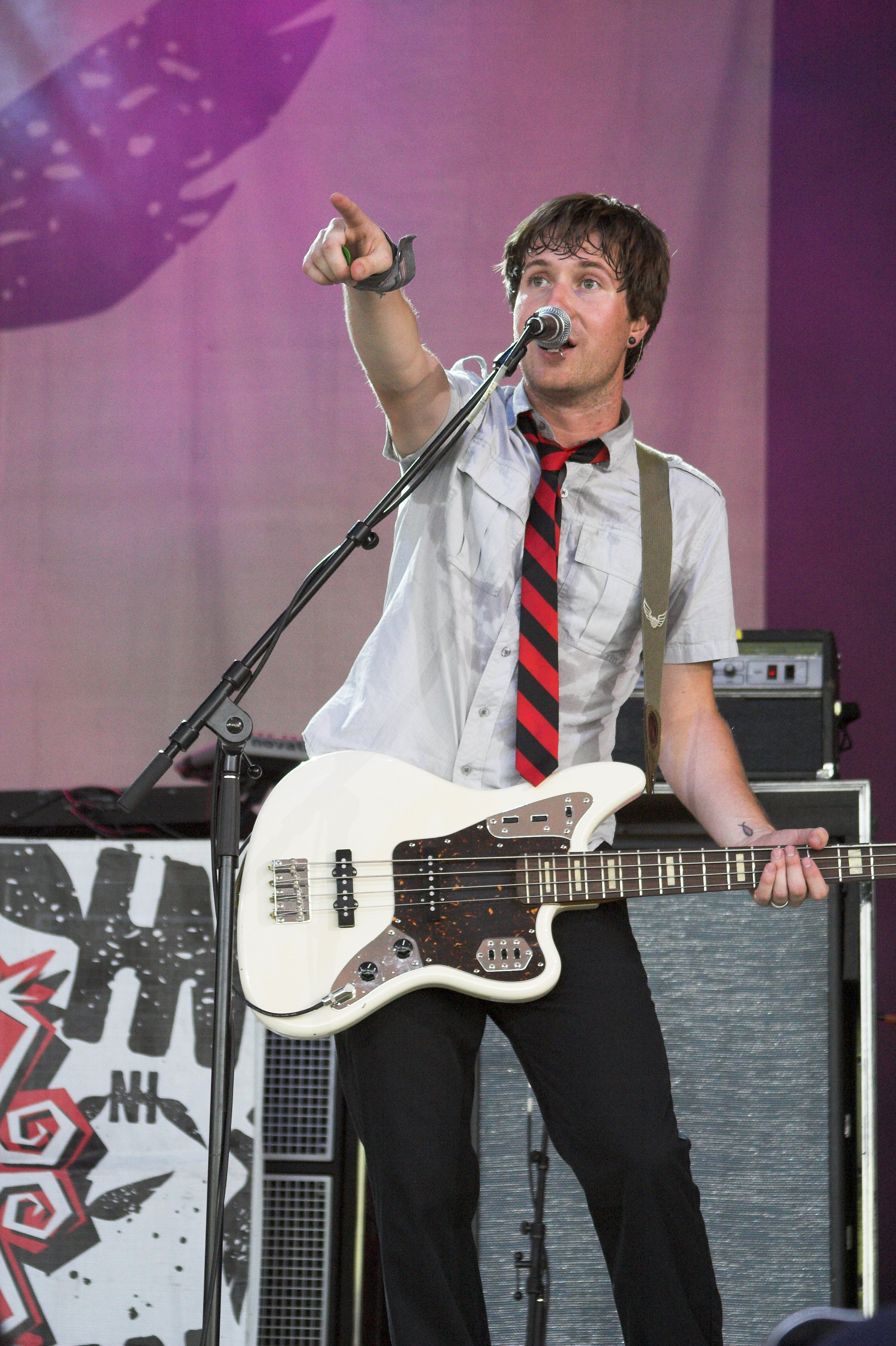
Bassist Daniel Biro, the only constant original member of the band

After Dunn's departure from the band, Steingard replacing him on vocals marked a shift in the band's genre from fast-paced pop punk to softer, contemporary alternative and pop rock. On December 11, 2012, Hawk Nelson announced they had signed with Fair Trade Services. Made was released on April 2, 2013. The album's release was preceded by the release of the album's debut single on January 15, 2013, "Words", featuring Bart Millard of MercyMe, which reached No. 1 on the Christian Hot AC/CHR charts.

On December 10, 2014, Hawk Nelson released the first single off an upcoming album, "Drops In the Ocean" via YouTube and made available on iTunes January 13. The album, Diamonds was announced on January 21. Diamonds is Jonathan Steingard's second album as lead vocalist for the band and first for guitarist Micah Kuiper and drummer David Niacaris. "Just Getting Started", another song from Diamonds, was heard in several American Idol promo spots ahead of the album's release. The album was released on iTunes and other major music websites on March 17, 2015.

On December 15, 2017, the band released the single, "He Still Does (Miracles)", as part of a new album, Miracles, which was released April 6, 2018, through Fair Trade Services.

In May 2020, Steingard announced on his Instagram page that he had lost his faith in God and was no longer a Christian. In response, Daniel Biro made a post on the band's official Instagram page the following day thanking his bandmates and expressed continued support for them on and off the road. The band has not been active since then, though no formal announcement of a disbandment was ever made.

Since his departure, Dunn has continued to occasionally release music as a solo artist, and in 2026 released his debut solo studio album, titled Formerly Known As…, to critical acclaim.

== Band members ==
- Daniel Biro – bass guitar, backing vocals (2000–2020)
- Jason Dunn – lead vocals, keyboards, rhythm guitar (2000–2012)
- Dave 'Davin' Clark – lead guitar, backing vocals (2000–2004)
- Matt 'Matty' Paige – drums (2000–2005)
- Jonathan Steingard – lead guitar, backing vocals (2004–2012), lead vocals, rhythm guitar, keyboards, piano, synthesizers (2012–2020)
- Gideon 'Gidz' Courtney – drums (2005)
- Aaron 'Skwid' Tosti – drums (2005–2008)
- Justin Benner – drums (2008–2014)
- Micah Kuiper – lead guitar, backing vocals (2013–2020)
- David Niacaris – drums (2015–2020)

Timeline

== Discography ==
Albums As SWISH

- 2000: Riding Around the Park (Independent)

As Hawk Nelson

- 2003: Saturday Rock Action (Independent)
- 2004: Letters to the President (Tooth & Nail Records)
- 2006: Smile, It's the End of the World (Tooth & Nail Records)
- 2008: Hawk Nelson Is My Friend (BEC Recordings)
- 2009: Live Life Loud (BEC Recordings)
- 2011: Crazy Love (BEC Recordings)
- 2013: Made (Fair Trade Services)
- 2015: Diamonds (Fair Trade Services)
- 2018: Miracles (Fair Trade Services)

== Awards ==
GMA Canada Covenant Awards

- 2006 Modern Rock/Alternative Album of the Year: Smile, It's the End of the World
- 2007 two nominations: Modern Rock/Alternative Song of the Year: "The One Thing I Have Left", and Recorded Song of the Year: "Everything You Ever Wanted"
- 2008 two nominations: Group of the Year, and Modern Rock/Alternative Album of the Year: Hawk Nelson Is My Friend
- 2009 Modern Rock/Alternative Song of the Year: "Live Life Loud"
- 2010 two awards: Modern Rock/Alternative Album of the Year: Live Life Loud!, and Modern Rock/Alternative Song of the Year: "Never Enough"
- 2011 two awards: Rock Album of the Year: Crazy Love, and Rock Song of the Year: "Crazy Love"

GMA Dove Awards

- 2007 nominee, Recorded Music Packaging: Smile, It's the End of the World
- 2009 nominee, Recorded Music Packaging: Hawk Nelson Is My Friend
- 2010 nominee, Recorded Music Packaging: Live Life Loud
- 2012 nominee, Rock Recorded Song of the Year: You Love Is A Mystery
- 2012 nominee, Rock/Contemporary Recorded Song of the Year: Crazy Love
- 2012 nominee, Rock/Contemporary Album of the Year: Crazy Love
- 2012 nominee, Short Form Music Video of the Year: Crazy Love

Golden Ear Music Awards (Ignite Your Faith Magazine)

- 2006 two wins: Best Band, and Best Male Vocalist: Jason Dunn

Grammy Awards

- 2009 nominee, Best Recording Package: Hawk Nelson Is My Friend

Juno Awards

- 2007 nominee, Contemporary Christian/Gospel Album of the Year: Smile, It's the End of the World
- 2012 nominee, Contemporary Christian/Gospel Album of the Year: Crazy Love

VH1

- 2006, No. 1 spot on VH1's top 20 video countdown with "The One Thing I Have Left" music video.
