= Jonathan Steingard =

Canadian musician (born 1983)

- Born: 1983 (age 42–43); Canada
- Genres: Pop punk, alternative rock, pop rock, gospel
- Occupations: Musician, singer, songwriter
- Instruments: Vocals, guitar, keyboards, synths
- Formerly of: Hawk Nelson
- Website: www.jonathansteingard.com

Jonathan Steingard (born 1983) is a Canadian musician who was the lead vocalist and lead guitarist for the Christian pop-punk band Hawk Nelson, which he joined in October 2004, replacing the former guitarist David Clark. He took over vocal duties upon Jason Dunn's departure in March 2012, until his own departure in 2020.

== Career ==
His side projects include September Satellite, The Natural Anthem, two albums entitled Fox Run, Under The Canopy and an EP Atlantis. Steingard's first principal side project, Fox Run, released on October 25, 2006, utilizes a large number of instruments for a unique sound. His second album Under The Canopy, released on November 25, 2008, is rather an emotional alternative one rather than the pop-punk genre of Hawk Nelson, while three singles from Under The Canopy was featured in the Atlantis EP released on November 11, 2008, and available for free download.

Steingard served as a judge for The 13th and 14th Annual Independent Music Awards in 2014 and 2015.

Steingard appeared as a vocalist for the track "Wildfire" in the video game Honkai: Star Rail, which released on April 26, 2023.

== Personal life ==
The oldest of three children, Steingard started playing the guitar at the age of 9. He plays PRS Guitars, Matchless and Metroamp Amps, Pedaltrain Pedalboards, and GHS Strings. His touring PRS guitars include an SC245, a Mira, and a Chris Henderson Model.

Steingard married Jessica Hubbard in March 2007.

On May 20, 2020, Steingard announced on Instagram that he no longer believes in God, but remains open to believing again in the future.
