= Spartan Records discography =

This is the list of releases for Spartan Records by order of release.

== Releases ==
Year	Artist	Album / Song	Format	Other
2007	Anchor & Braille	Sound Asleep and Wedding/Funeral	Vinyl	7" purple vinyl
2010	Sky's the Limit	Sky's the Limit	Digital download	re-release
2011	Over the Ocean	Paper House	Digital download	
2011	Ourlives	Out of Place	Compact disc/digital download	
2012	Mae	Destination: Beautiful	Vinyl	re-release 12" colored vinyl
2013	Over the Ocean	Be Given to the Soil	Vinyl/digital download	12" Colored double vinyl
2013	Shy, Low	Binary Opposition	Vinyl/digital download	12" colored vinyl
2013	Waypoint	"Solus"	Digital download	Single
2013	Daisyhead	I Couldn't Face You	Vinyl/digital download	7" white vinyl
2013	Schematic	Color (n.) Inside the Lines	Vinyl/compact disc/digital download	12" colored double vinyl
2013	(Spartan Records Sampler)	The Sounds We're Making	Free digital download	Commemorates first 10 releases
2013	Schematic	"Wonderful Christmastime"	Digital download	Single
2014	States	Paradigm	Vinyl/digital download	12" colored vinyl
2014	Barren Womb	The Sun's Not Yellow, it's Chicken	Vinyl/digital download	12" colored vinyl
2014	Young Fox	Predecessors	Digital download	12" colored vinyl
2014	The Foxery	Unless	Vinyl/digital download	
2014	Ourlives	Den of Lions	Vinyl/digital download	12" colored vinyl and picture disc
2014	Waypoint	"Creature of Habit" EP	Vinyl/digital download	10" colored vinyl
2014	Sullivan	Heavy Is the Head	Vinyl/compact disc/digital	Colored/black vinyl
2014	Sense Field	"Tonight and Forever"	Vinyl/digital download	re-release
2014	Trespassers	"No Turning Back" EP	Digital download	
2014	Mae	Destination: B-Sides	Vinyl/digital download	12" colored vinyl re-release with two new songs
2014	Spartan Records Compilation	Homesick: A Spartan Records Christmas Album	Digital download	Second cooperative work by artists
2015	Unifier	Oh Great City EP	Digital download	
2015	Tresspassers	Rival Glass EP	Compact disc/digital download	
2015	Unifier	Gutted EP	Compact disc/digital download	
2015	NYVES	Anxiety	Vinyl/digital download	12" colored vinyl
2015	Demons	Great Dismal EP	Vinyl/digital download	12" Silk screened image on Colored Vinyl
2015	Kiska	Kiska	Vinyl/digital download	
2015	Lucky Scars	Rock and Roll Party Foul EP	7" colored vinyl/digital download	
2015	Shy, Low	Hiraeth	Colored vinyl/compact disc/digital download	
2015	Barren Womb	Nique Everything	Colored vinyl/digital download	
2015	Renaissance Fair	Renaissance Fair EP	Digital download	
2016	Secret Stuff	This Is Fine EP	Colored vinyl/cassette/digital download	
2016	Square Peg Round Hole	Juniper	Compact disc/digital download	
2016	Unifier	Gutted EP	Compact disc/digital download	
2016	NYVES	Anxiety	Vinyl/digital download	12" colored vinyl
2016	Demons	Great Dismal EP	Vinyl/digital download	12" silk screened image on colored vinyl
2016	Trace Bundy	Elephant King	Vinyl/digital download	
2016	My God, It's Full of Stars	M29 EP	10" colored vinyl/digital download	
2016	Sense Field	Living OUtside	Colored vinyl/digital download	
2016	The Foxery	American Dissonance	Digital download	
2016	Ourlives	Higher Hopes	Digital download	
2016	Secret Stuff/ Sundressed	Secret Stuff/ Sundressed	7" colored vinyl/digital download	
2016	Mae	The Everglow	Colored vinyl/digital download	
2017	Mae	Our Love Is A Painted Picture EP	7" colored vinyl/digital download	
2017	Young Fox	Sky Beats Gold	Colored vinyl/digital download	
2017	American Opera	Small Victories	Colored vinyl/digital download	Compact disc
2017	Lights & Motion	Dear Avalanche	Colored vinyl/digital download	
2017	Demons	Embrace Wolf	Colored vinyl/digital download	
2018	Man Mountain	Infinity Mirror	Colored vinyl/digital download	
2018	Barren Womb	Old Money/New Lows	Colored vinyl/digital download	
2018	Honey and Salt	Honey and Salt	Colored vinyl/digital download	
2018	Dearist	Sonder	Colored vinyl/digital download	
2018	Hidden Hospitals	Surface Tension	Colored vinyl/digital download	
2018	Hidden Hospitals	Liars	Colored vinyl/digital download	
2018	Subways on the Sun	Capsize	Colored vinyl/digital download	
2019	The Darling Fire	Dark Celebration	Colored vinyl/digital download	
2019	Florida Man	Tropical Depression	Colored vinyl/digital download	12" picture disc
2019	Surprises	Natural Disaster	Colored vinyl/digital download	
2019	Fallow Land	Slow Down, Rockstar	Colored vinyl/digital download	
2019	Reader	Engrams	Colored vinyl/digital download	12" picture disc
2019	Mae	Singularity	Colored vinyl	re-release on colored vinyl for first time
2019	Giants Chair	Prefabylon	Colored vinyl/digital download	
2020	VAR	The Never-Ending Year	Colored vinyl/digital download	
