= Evening (disambiguation) =

The evening is the period of the day between afternoon and night.

Evening(s) may also refer to:

== Film ==
- Evening (film), a 2007 film based on the 1998 novel by Susan Minot
- Evenings (film), a 1989 Dutch film

== Music ==
- "Evening", a 2022 song by Korean singer Yuju and Big Naughty
- Evening (EP), by Mae
- Symphony No. 8 (Haydn) by Haydn, nicknamed "Evening"

== Publications ==
- Evening (magazine), a Japanese manga magazine published by Kodansha
- Evening, a 1998 novel by Susan Minot

== Other uses ==
- Evening (painting), an 1821 painting by Caspar David Friedrich
- Evenings, an Australian ABC radio program hosted by Christine Anu

== See also ==
- Evening star (disambiguation)
