= Destination: B-Sides =

Compilation album by Mae
- Released: November 16, 2004
- Recorded: Earthsound Recording (Chesapeake, Virginia)
- Genre: Emo, indie rock, pop punk
- Length: 56:17
- Label: Tooth & Nail Records (Original release); Spartan Records (Vinyl release)
- Producer: Mae & Aaron Sprinkle

Mae chronology
| Destination: Beautiful (2003) | Destination: B-Sides (2004) | From Toledo to Tokyo (2005) |

Professional ratings
Review scores
| Source | Rating |
|---|---|
| Allmusic | link |
| Jesus Freak Hideout | link |

Destination: B-Sides is a compilation album released by American alternative/indie band Mae. It includes b-sides, remixes, and live recordings of the band's earlier work.

== Track listing ==
All songs written by Mae.

1. "This Time Is the Last Time (Wave Remix)" – 3:25
2. "Suspension" – 3:50
3. "Sun (Acoustic)" – 5:22
4. "Tisbury Lane" – 5:45
5. "Awakening" – 4:16
6. "Futuro (Live)" – 3:11
7. "Sun (Live)" – 7:30
8. "This Time Is the Last Time (Live)" – 5:23
9. "Giving It Away (Acoustic)" – 5:20
10. "Goodbye, Goodnight (S.M. Remix)" – 4:31
11. "Going to School" (Hidden Track) - 3:41

== Personnel ==
- Dave Elkins – lead vocals, guitar
- Zach Gehring – guitar
- Jacob Marshall – drums
- Rob Sweitzer – keyboard, vocals, lead vocals on "Awakening"
- Mark Padgett – bass, vocals

== Vinyl Release ==
Destination: B-Sides limited edition vinyl was released by Spartan Records and shipped on 01/21/2015.
