= The Everglow EP =

EP by Mae
- Released: November 21, 2006
- Genre: Emo, indie rock
- Length: 12:13
- Label: Tooth & Nail Records
- Producer: Mae

Mae chronology
| Live Music Series: Mae EP (2006) | The Everglow EP (2006) | Singularity (2007) |

The Everglow EP is an EP by Virginia alternative/indie band Mae. This album has been released on Tooth & Nail Records as an exclusive download available through online music stores on November 21, 2006. This EP includes the three additional songs that were included on The Everglow: Special Edition that were not on The Everglow.

== Track listing ==
1. "Where the Fall Begins" – 3:42
2. "A Day In the Life" - 4:42
3. "Suspension (Demo)" – 3:49
