= Landesmuseum Hannover =

Museum in Hanover, Germany

Lower Saxon State Museum Hanover
- Niedersächsisches Landesmuseum Hannover
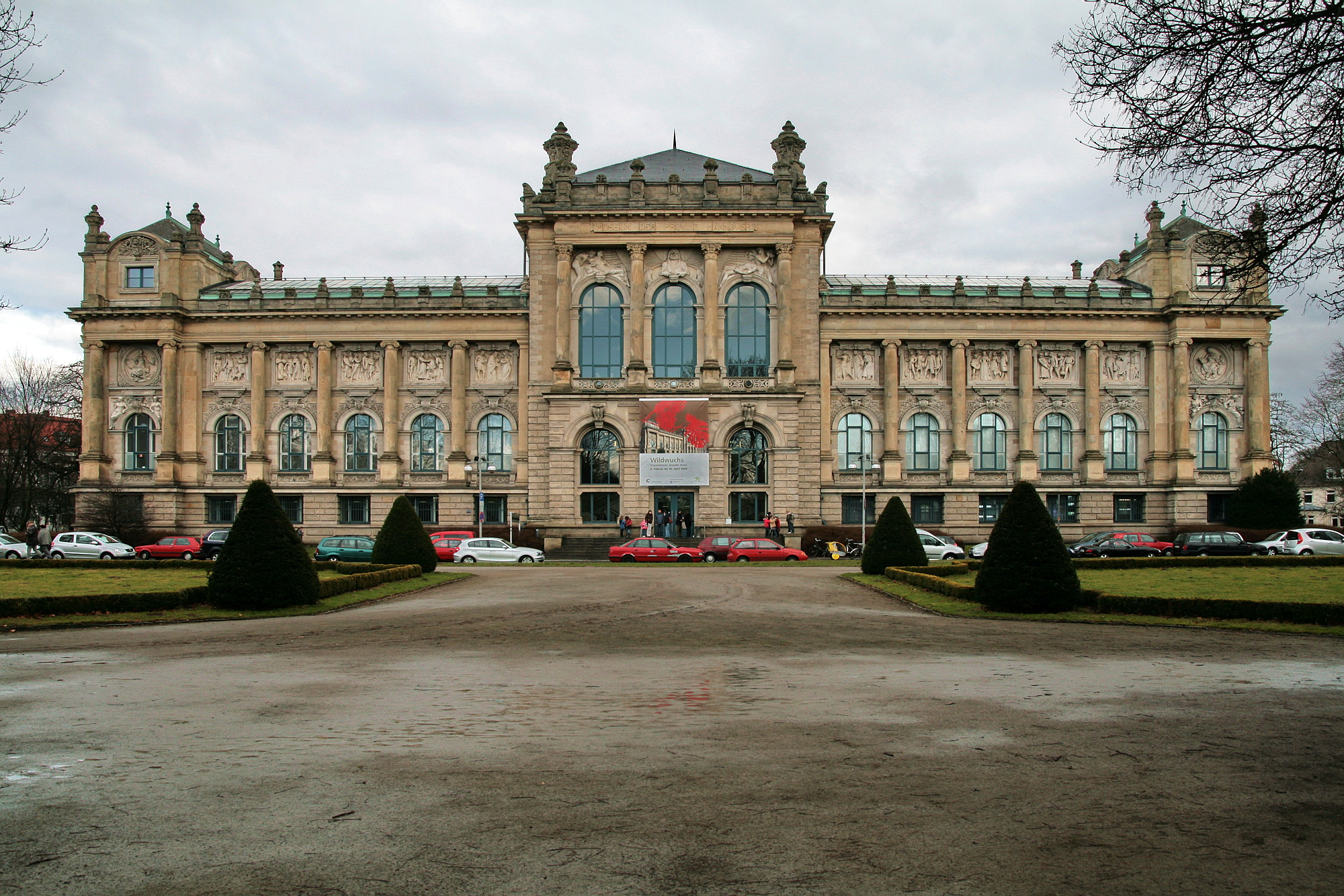
- Established: 1856; 170 years ago
- Location: Hanover, Lower Saxony, Germany
- Coordinates: 52°21′56″N 9°44′24″E
- Type: Art museum; Historical museum; Archaeological museum; Natural history museum; Ethnological museum
- Website: www.landesmuseum-hannover.de/en/

The Lower Saxon State Museum Hanover (German: Niedersächsisches Landesmuseum Hannover, or simply Landesmuseum Hannover) is the state museum of Lower Saxony in Hanover, Germany. Situated adjacent to the New Town Hall, the museum comprises the state gallery (Landesgalerie), featuring paintings and sculptures from the Middle Ages to the 20th century, and departments of archaeology, natural history and ethnology. The museum includes a vivarium with fish, amphibians, reptiles and arthropods.

== History ==
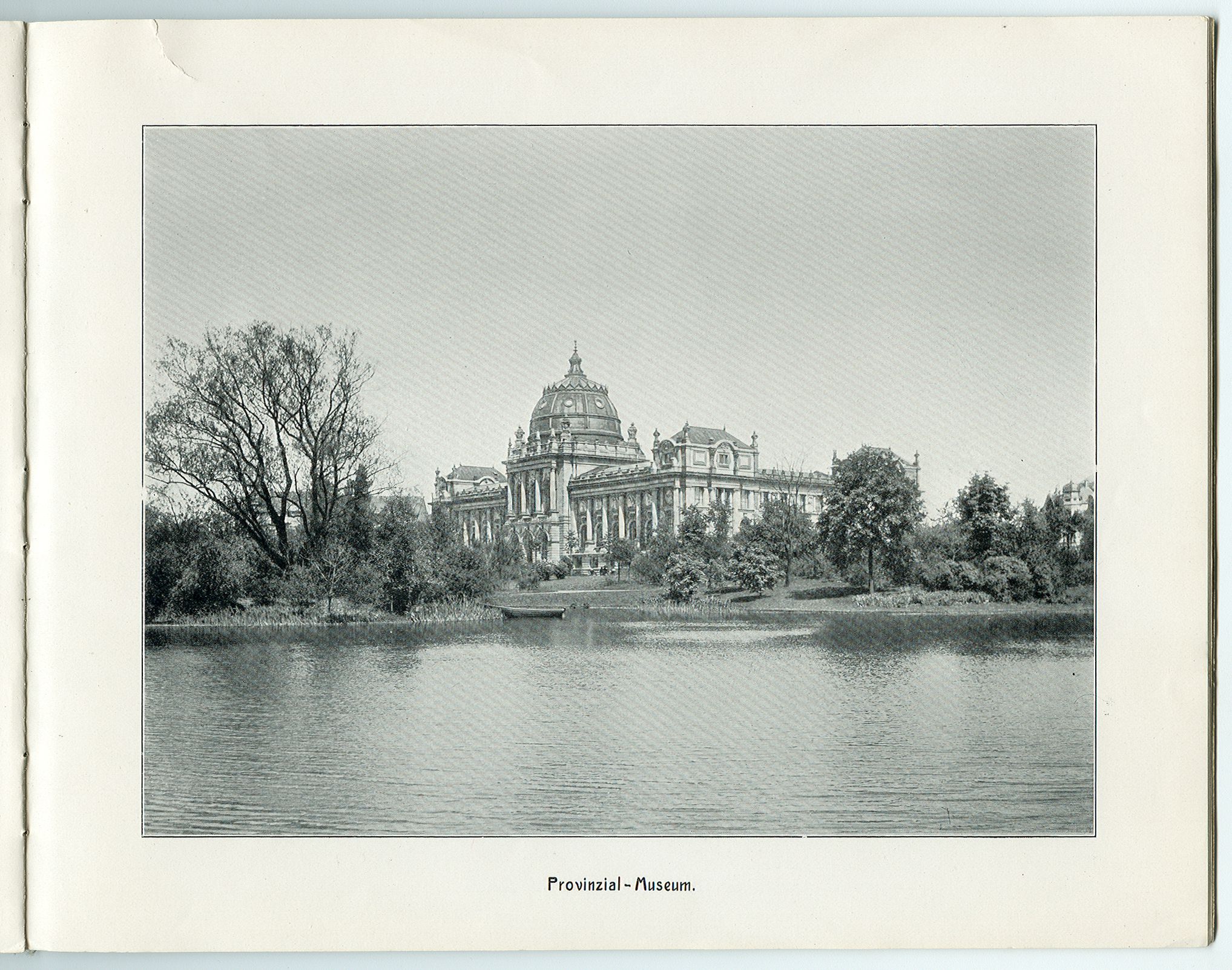
The Provincial Museum, c. 1900. Clearly visible is the cupola that the museum had above the central risalit at the time.

Originally the Museum of Art and Science (Museum für Kunst und Wissenschaft) inaugurated in 1856 in the presence of George V of Hanover based in the present-day Hanover Arthouse (Künstlerhaus), it was later renamed Museum of the Province of Hanover, or simply Provincial Museum. The museum soon ran out of space for its art collections, prompting the construction of the current building, designed by Hubert Stier in a Neo-Renaissance style, on the edge of the Maschpark in 1902. The building's relief frieze, titled "Key Moments in the Evolution of Humanity" (Hauptmomente in der Entwicklung der Menschheit), was created by the Hanoverian artist Georg Herting in partnership with Karl Gundelach and Georg Küsthardt. It was renamed the State Museum in 1933, and finally the Lower Saxon State Museum of Hanover in 1950.

The museum building suffered extensive damage from aerial bombings of Hanover during World War II. During the air raid on Hanover on the night beginning 8 October 1943, the cupola above the central risalit was destroyed and the second floor burnt out. However, most of the museum contents had been evacuated by then and were spared destruction. After the war ended in 1945, the museum reopened with an exhibition in the orangery of the Herrenhausen Gardens, and starting in 1947 with small exhibitions in smaller museum buildings. While renovations of the main museum building continued into the 1960s, permanent exhibitions began to reopen between 1950 and 1956.

Extensive renovations and modernisations were carried out in the interior from 1995 to 2000, reopening on 13 May 2000 as part of Expo 2000.

== Collections ==
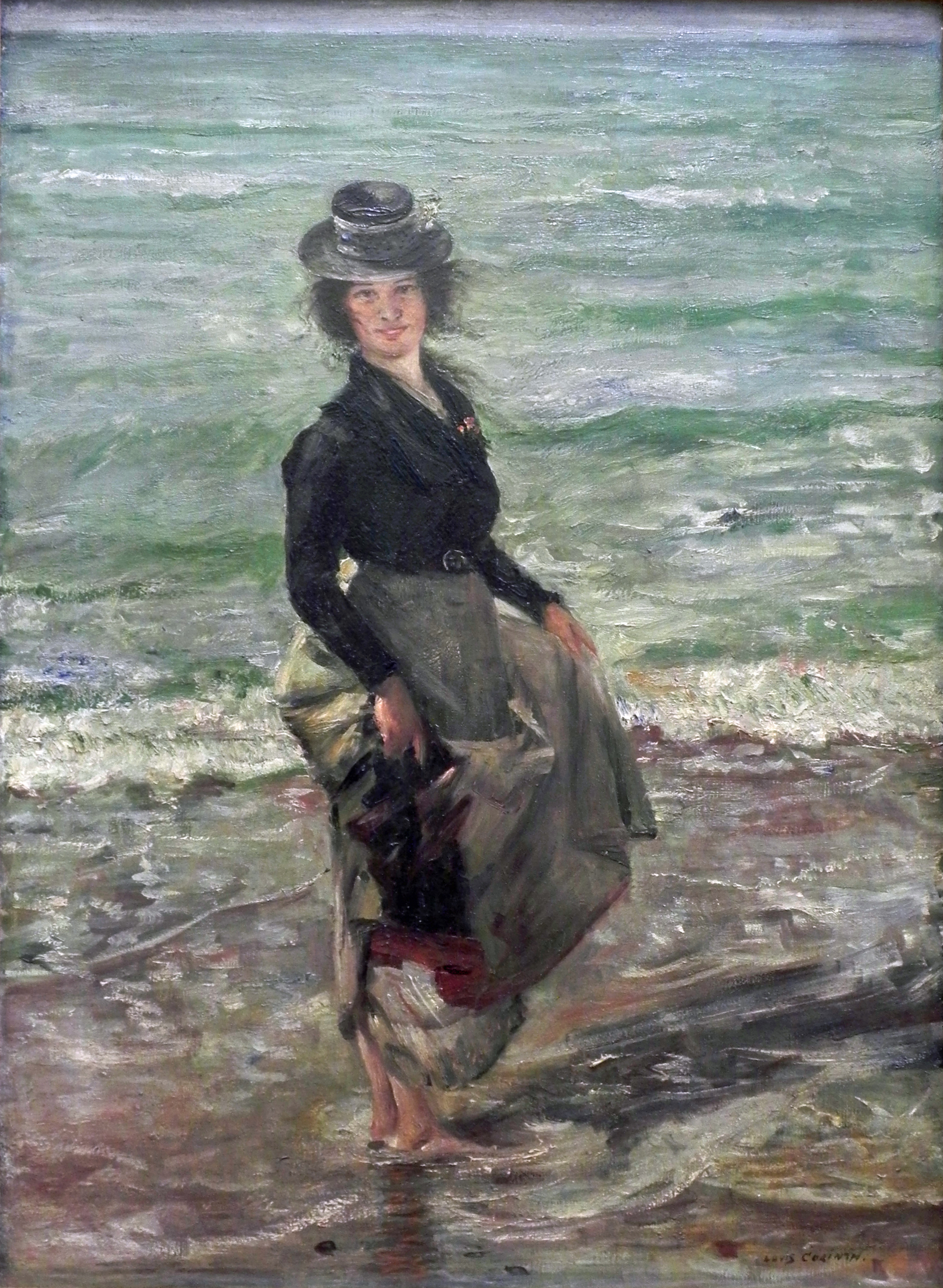
Lovis Corinth, Paddel-Petermannchen (his nickname for his wife).

=== State gallery ===
The state gallery features art from the 11th to the 20th centuries. The collection includes German and Italian works from the Renaissance and the Baroque, 17th-century Flemish and Dutch paintings, Danish paintings from the 19th and 20th centuries (such as by Constantin Hansen), and a print room featuring old German masters, Dutch drawings, 19th-century print works, and drawings by German impressionists. Some of the best-known artists include Rembrandt, Rubens and Albrecht Dürer.

The gallery's other strengths include German and French Impressionist paintings, works by Max Liebermann, Lovis Corinth and Max Slevogt, and major works from members of the Künstlerkolonie Worpswede group, such as Bernhard Hoetger, Fritz Overbeck, Otto Modersohn and Paula Modersohn-Becker. Caspar David Friedrich's four-piece Tageszeitenzyklus (Times of Day) is the only complete such series by Friedrich in a single museum.

Tageszeitenzyklus by Caspar David Friedrich
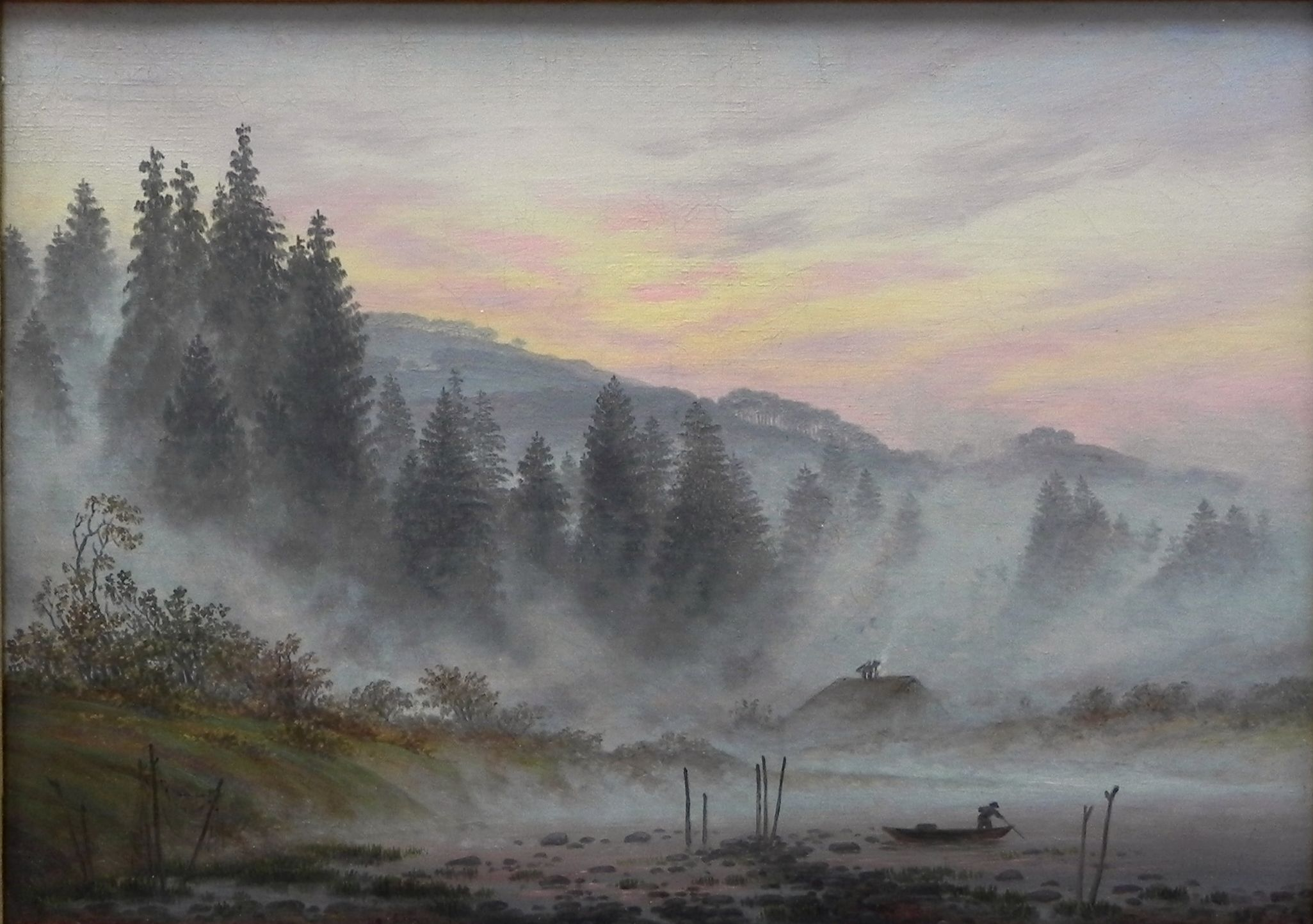
Morning

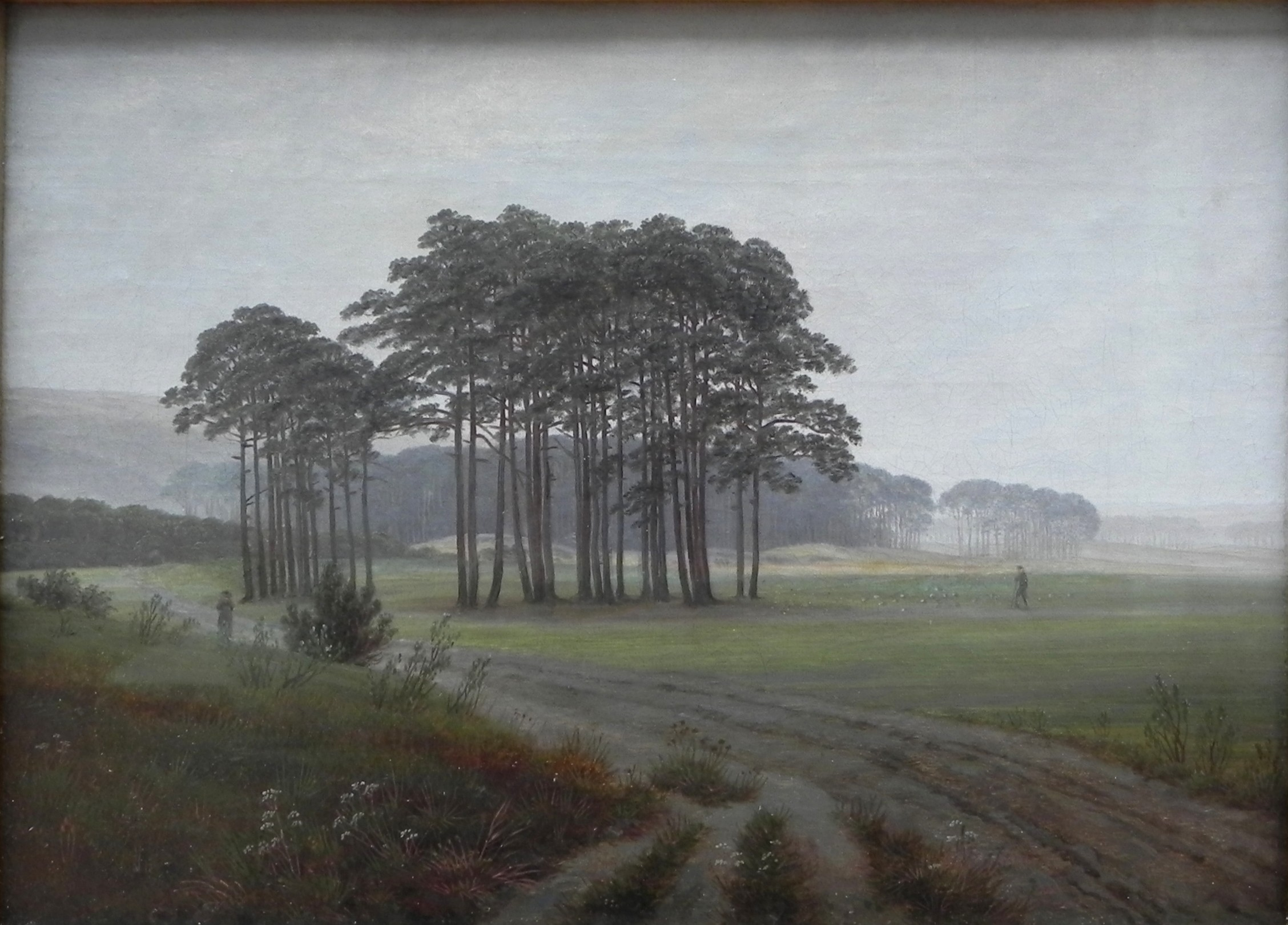
Midday

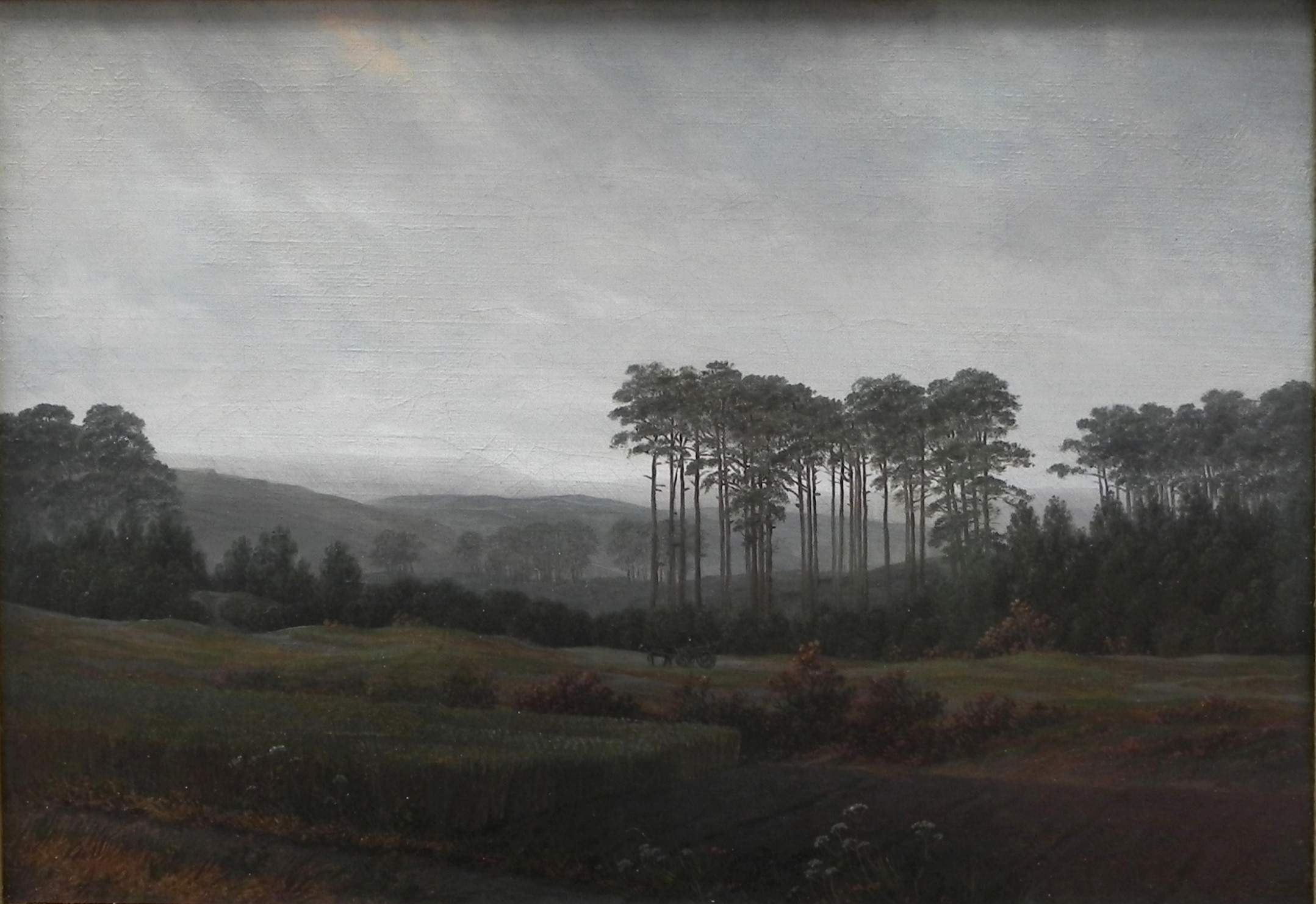
Afternoon

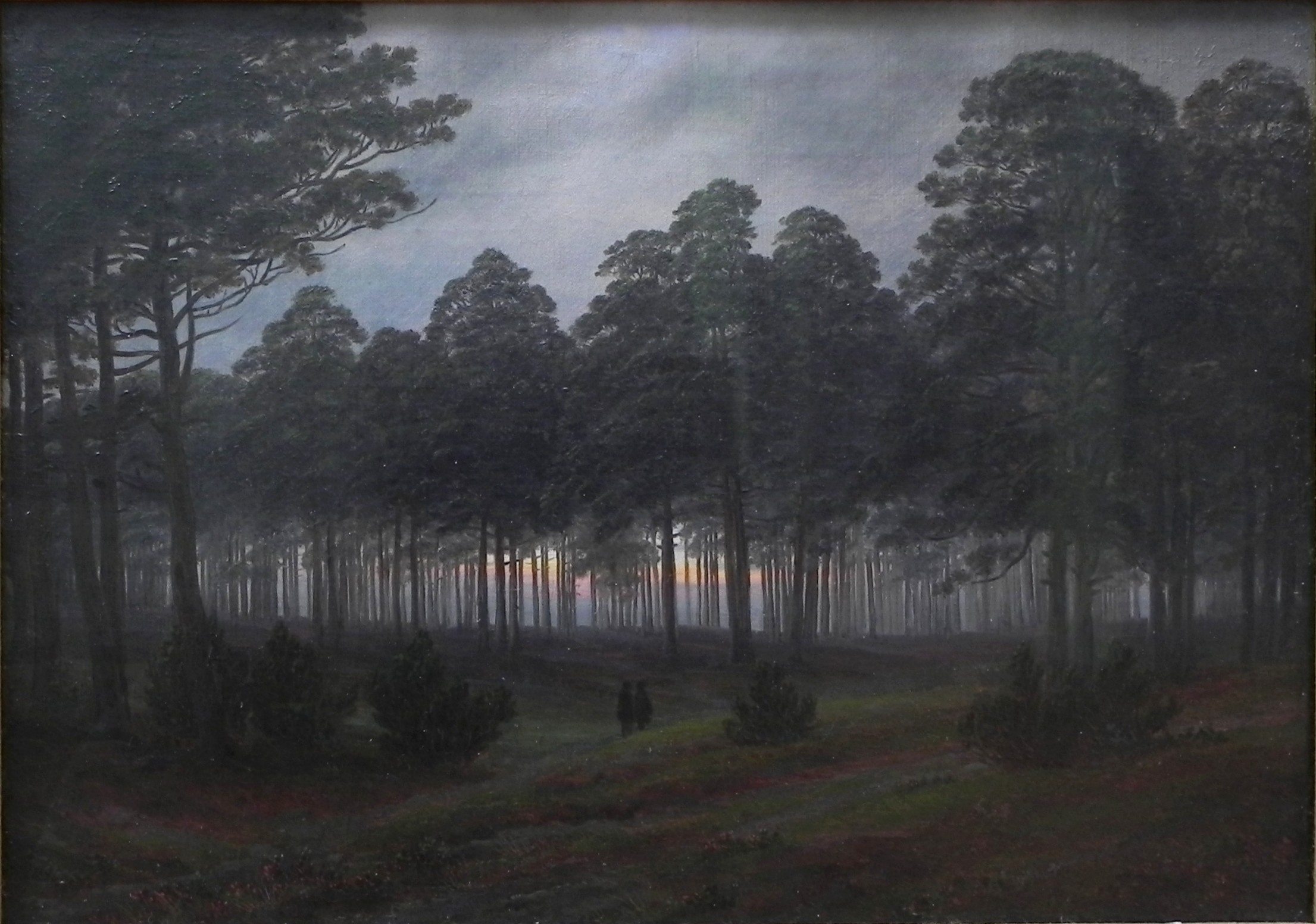
Evening

=== Natural history ===
The natural history department features a life-sized model of a dinosaur, and a vivarium with more than 2,000 native and exotic fish, amphibians and reptiles. The model dinosaur, an iguanodon, is not an accurate reconstruction by the standards of modern palaeontology, but has been integrated into an exhibition which shows the changing reconstructions of this species over time. The department also has zoological, botanical, anthropological, geographical and geological exhibits on the primeval history of Lower Saxony's regions, including the Harz mountains, the heathlands, and the North Sea coast.

=== Archaeology ===
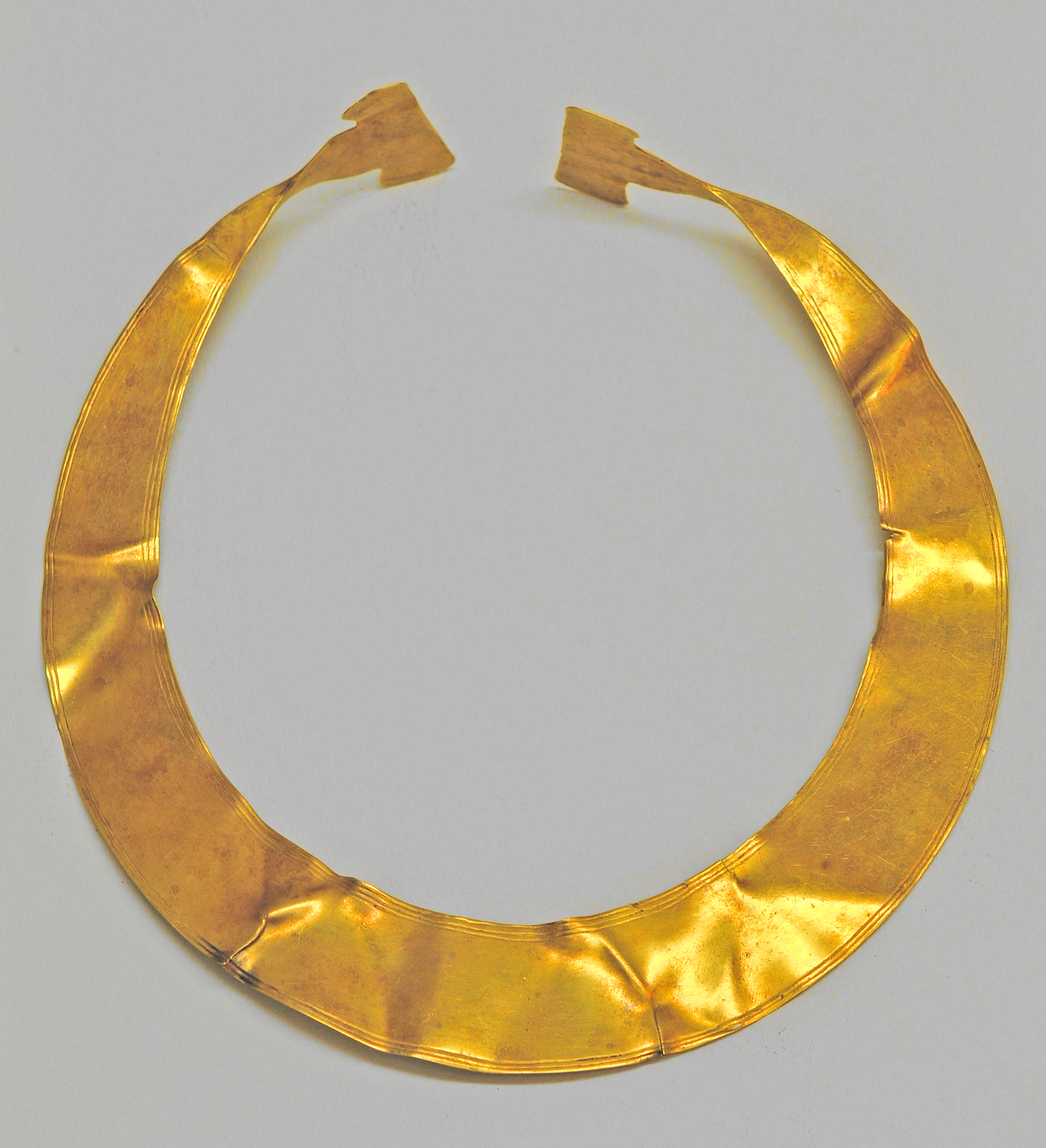
The Gold Lunula of Schulenburg, discovered 1911.

The museum has a major archaeological collection, containing some unique finds. With over a million artifacts showing the economic and technological development of human settlement, the display covers almost 500,000 years of history, spanning the early Stone Age to the late Middle Ages, from the early hunter-gatherer cultures to the blossoming of metropolitan life. The archaeology department is supported by the Lower Saxon State Society of Prehistory (Niedersächsischer Landesverein für Urgeschichte), and its working group Arbeitskreis... Steinzeit.

=== Ethnology ===
The ethnological collection is among the oldest in the German-speaking area of Europe (Deutscher Sprachraum), and includes around 20,000 artworks and everyday artefacts from all parts of the world. A wide range of religions and cultures in America, Africa, Oceania and Asia is displayed through the findings of explorers and ethnologists.

== Special exhibitions and facilities ==
The museum regularly hosts temporary exhibitions on changing themes, and its pest control facility (a nitrogen chamber) suitable for artworks and artefacts is available for use by the public.
