= Singularity (Mae album) =

Studio album by Mae
- Released: (United States) August 14, 2007
- Recorded: Bay 7 Studio (Valley Village, California); Mates Studio (Burbank, California); Earthsound Studio (Long Beach, California); Sparky Dark Studio (Calabasas, California)
- Genres: Power pop, Pop, Rock
- Length: 46:09
- Labels: Tooth & Nail, Capitol
- Producers: Mae & Howard Benson

Mae chronology
The Everglow Special Edition (2006)	Singularity (2007)	(m)orning (2009)

Professional ratings
Review scores
Source	Rating
Allmusic	4.5/5 stars
JustPressPlay.net	(8.2/10)

Singularity is American rock band Mae's third full-length release and their major label debut. The album was originally to be released in April 2007 on Tooth & Nail Records like their previous two albums, but the band signed a deal with major label Capitol Records soon after the new album announcement which pushed the release date back to a US release of August 14, 2007. It was released in Japan on August 22, 2007.

== Production ==
Mae headed to Los Angeles to record Singularity with producer Howard Benson in October 2006. The band came up with the title Singularity from a book that Marshall and Sweitzer were reading by Australian scientist Paul Davies. Jacob Marshall referred to the term as being "the ultimate unknowable in science... the interface between the natural and the supernatural.’ We realized through those conversations that there is so much more for us to learn and to understand and these ideas inspired us to question everything." This album is considered pop and rock.

The band was inspired by bands like Pearl Jam, U2, The Smashing Pumpkins, Nirvana, and Rage Against the Machine when they were creating Singularity. Jacob stated in a recent interview with Fuss Magazine that Mae collaborated with musical artist Kenna for a track titled "Novacaine" that would be for the Japanese release. Jacob said the band would try to leak the extra track to their listeners. The track would be released on release day as a bonus track via the iTunes Store.

== Release date ==
At a concert in Charlottesville on April 30, Dave Elkins stated that the release date would be August 14, 2007 on Capitol Records. This was confirmed by Zach Gehring in a news post to the band's website and mailing list on May 3. On June 18, Mae posted the song "Brink of Disaster" on their MySpace page. On June 20, the song "Sometimes I Can't Make It Alone" was made available as a digital download through the United States iTunes Store, though it was not intended to be released until June 26. On June 26 the song was made available to purchase through Napster, Amazon and all other digital outlets. It was also made available as a ringtone through most major cell phone companies and it was posted on their MySpace page. Mae has offered an autographed booklet with pre-orders via the Interpunk and SmartPunk stores. Singularity was leaked to file-sharing sites on August 3, 2007. On August 10, 2007 the band made Singularity available to stream on the band's MySpace website. For almost one week following its release, the new album was mislabeled on iTunes as performed by "Various Artists," which could have caused downloaders to have had issues searching for the new Mae album.

Following its release, Singularity debuted at number 40 on the U.S. Billboard 200, selling about 17,000 copies in its first week.

== Webisodes ==
The band has been producing weekly webisodes on website devoted to the album and its release. The band releases webisodes weekly named after a song on the album, and features the song in the webisode. Each episode features band members explaining what each song means. Each episode contains footage of studio recordings. The intro and outro to a couple of videos can be perceived as subliminal messaging as promoting 081407 (date: August 14, 2007), the day Singularity was released.

Date	Webisode
June 11, 2007	Brink of Disaster
June 18, 2007	Rocket
June 25, 2007	Sometimes I Can't Make It Alone
July 9, 2007	Crazy 8s
July 16, 2007	SST
July 23, 2007	Just Let Go
July 30, 2007	Telescopes
August 6, 2007	Home
August 13, 2007	Singularity

== Track listing ==
The final track listing was announced in a MySpace bulletin by Rob on May 26.

All songs written by Mae

- "Last Transmission" – 1:33 (Hidden track in the pregap)
1. "Brink of Disaster" – 3:38
2. "Crazy 8s" – 4:01
3. "Sometimes I Can't Make It Alone" – 3:15
4. "Just Let Go" – 3:17
5. "On Top" – 3:47
6. "Waiting" – 4:51
7. "Sic Semper Tyrannis" – 3:20*
8. "Release Me" – 4:01
9. "Telescopes" – 3:25
10. "Rocket" – 2:52
11. "Home" – 3:37
12. "Reflections" – 6:05
- "Sic Semper Tyrannis" is also known as SST for short, as it was titled during their webisode dated July 16, 2007.
- There is one more track to the physical CD which can be heard if the disc is "rewound" back to -1:33 of track 1. This track is known as "Last Transmission"; which made an appearance in a webisode not included in the 081407.com website but is part of Mae's Youtube.com profile.

Bonus tracks:

13. "(Silence)" – 4:07
14. "Last Transmission II" – 6:38

iTunes release:

13. "Last Transmission II" (Hidden Track) – 6:38
14. "Novocaine" (Bonus Track) (feat. Kenna) – 4:17

Japanese release:

1. "Last Transmission" / "Brink of Disaster" – 5:02
13. "(Silence)" – 4:07
14. "Last Transmission II" – 6:43
15. "Novocaine" (feat. Kenna) – 4:16

== Personnel ==
- Dave Elkins – vocals, guitar
- Zach Gehring – guitar, vocals
- Mark Padgett – bass, vocals
- Jacob Marshall – drums, vocals
- Rob Sweitzer – keyboards, Hammond B3, vocals

=== Technical personnel ===
- Published by – Myman Jones
- Produced by – Howard Benson
- Recorded by – Mike Plotnikoff
- Cover design – J. Michael Mollohan

== Charts ==
Chart	Peak position
U.S. Billboard 200	40

== DVD ==
There was a possibility of a DVD being co-released with the new album. The band's tour manager has filmed almost 100 hours of footage of the album's writing and recording, and says that much of the material "will likely make it to DVD either with the new album or as a stand alone DVD". Mae told Chart in June 2007 that they hope to release a DVD in late 2007 or early 2008.
