= Damiera =

American indie math rock band

- Origin: Buffalo, New York
- Genres: Experimental rock, math rock
- Years active: 2005 – 2009
- Label: Equal Vision Records
- Members: David Raymond (Vocals/Guitar); Steve Downs (Guitar)
- Past members: David Robinson (Drums); Evan Weiss (Bass); Bradley McRae (Drums); Mark Henry (Bass); Rock Whittington (Guitar); Matthew Kipp (Guitar); Justin Campell (Bass); Joshua Sparks (Drums); Jayson Dezuzio (Bass)
- Website: Official website

Damiera was a four piece indie math rock band from Buffalo, New York that formed in 2005. They released two albums and an EP while touring around North America. The group disbanded in 2009.

== History ==
Damiera was formed in February 2005, by David Raymond and ex-guitarist/vocalist Matthew Kipp after the disbandment of their previous project, League. After a short while the two invited Bradley McRae, to join the line-up. Bassist Mark Henry, was added only a short while after. By late May 2005, the band had played a handful of shows, self-produced their debut EP "Damiera EP", and booked a two-month tour. Kipp left the band at the conclusion of Damiera's first tour to pursue different interests.

In 2005, Rock Whittington, a guitarist from New Orleans joined the band for two months of rehearsals. In February 2006 with Jayson Dezuzio (Coheed and Cambria, My Chemical Romance) recording the debut LP M(US)IC that was released under Tamerlane Recordings in 2006, then re-released with Equal Vision Records in January 2007. The band embarked on a self-booked 110-day-long tour that ended September 10, 2006.

In early April, the band announced that they had cancelled all future shows. On April 14, 2007 their website, stated: "We set a goal, and found it. Thank you for your ears, kind words, and your time." A press release by Equal Vision Records from June 13, 2007 stated the band had reformed with new members: "Back in April, three fourths of Damiera left the band to pursue other goals. The departing members were "Seeking satisfaction elsewhere," says continuing member and vocalist Dave Raymond, "They wanted to take another road for now... without having to be committed to a group setting".

The new members included guitarist Steve Downs and drummer Josh Sparks, formerly of the Iowa-based band Spirit of the Stairway, and bassist Jayson Dezuzio. This line-up released the album Quiet Mouth Loud Hands on June 24, 2008 through Equal Vision Records.

Drummer Joshua Sparks and bassist Jayson Dezuzio left the band soon after, and the band added bassist Evan Weiss of The Progress/Into It. Over It. and drummer David Robison of The Alaya Conscious. This line-up spent the first half of 2009 touring the album. In 2011, Raymond formed the band Hidden Hospitals.

== Discography ==
=== Albums ===
- 2005: EP One (Self-Released)
- 2006: M(US)IC (Tamerlane Recordings)
- 2007: M(US)IC (Re-release) (Equal Vision Records)
- 2008: Quiet Mouth Loud Hands (Equal Vision Records)
