= The Everglow =

Studio album by Mae
- Released: March 29, 2005
- Recorded: Red Swan Studios (Los Angeles, California)
- Genre: Indie rock, emo, pop punk, alternative rock, piano rock
- Length: 61:10; 73:19 (re-release)
- Label: Tooth & Nail
- Producer: Mae and Ken Andrews

Mae chronology
From Toledo to Tokyo (2005)	The Everglow (2005)	Connect Sets (2005)

Special Edition cover

Professional ratings
Review scores
Source	Rating
Allmusic	4/5 stars
Jesus Freak Hideout	4.5/5 stars
Sputnikmusic	(4.1/5)

The Everglow is the second studio album released by the American rock band Mae, on March 29, 2005. The album is designed as a storybook, including illustrations for each song inside the booklet. With its story-like nature, The Everglow is considered a concept album. "Prologue" and "Epilogue" have narrations by Charlotte Martin. The album was received positively, with 4 out of 5 stars from Allmusic, and 4½ out of 5 stars from Jesus Freak Hideout.

== Special edition ==
The Everglow was re-released by Tooth & Nail on April 18, 2006, as a special edition. The re-release contains three additional tracks: the new song "Where the Falls Begin", a cover of the Beatles' "A Day in the Life", and a demo of "Suspension" featuring Kenny Vasoli from The Starting Line. It was packaged with a DVD that contained music videos, featurettes, live footage and photo galleries. The hand-drawn artwork from the original The Everglow album was recreated with a young actor on sets.

== Track listing ==
All songs written by Mae unless otherwise noted.

1. "Prologue" – 1:16
2. "We're So Far Away" – 3:50
3. "Someone Else's Arms" – 5:09
4. "Suspension" – 4:00
5. "This Is the Countdown" – 3:57
6. "Painless" – 4:20
7. "The Ocean" – 4:41
8. "Breakdown" – 4:14
9. "Mistakes We Knew We Were Making" – 5:07
10. "Cover Me" – 4:34
11. "The Everglow" – 3:28
12. "Ready and Waiting to Fall" – 4:21
13. "Anything" – 4:03
14. "The Sun and the Moon" – 7:16
15. "Epilogue" – 0:54
16. "Where the Falls Begin"† – 3:40
17. "A Day in the Life"† (Lennon–McCartney) – 4:40
18. "Suspension"† (demo featuring Kenny Vasoli from The Starting Line) – 3:49

† Tracks added for special edition

== Credits ==
- Dave Elkins - vocals, rhythm guitar
- Zach Gehring - lead guitar
- Mark Padgett - bass
- Jacob Marshall - drums
- Rob Sweitzer - keyboards, vocals

Production

- Ken Andrews - producer, engineering, mixing
- Adam Ayan - mastering
- Ryan Clark (musician) - illustrated
- Asterik studio - design

== Song meanings ==
During a performance at the Avalon Theater in Salt Lake City, Utah, on September 6, 2006, frontman Dave Elkins made the following statement before the band performed "Mistakes We Knew We Were Making" (transcribed from video previously posted on YouTube):

I hope you know how much fun we’re having up here because of you guys. Well, this next song is a hypothetical story of a couple who falls in love; they’ve decided what they’re looking for and they find it in each other…and it’s very good, it’s very rewarding; but…well, not “but” but alongside of this, or as a result of this, an unborn baby comes into the picture before too long. And a lot of people have wondered and talked to us at shows, and I’ve seen it discussed on message boards and whatnot, and a lot of people thought this song is a story about an abortion or this song is a story stating us as pro-choice or pro-life, and that’s not necessarily the case here. What we’re looking at is the fact that as a result of this baby entering into the world, they find a love, these individuals, that’s more fulfilling and more rewarding, and more satisfying, than anything they had known up until that point. [Cheering] I think that it’s important that we understand that love is not always black and white like we’d like for it to be, and sometimes it’s very grey. Sometimes you have to make the difficult decisions. And sometimes you do have to try and fail, and fail and fail a few times before you can actually succeed and get the big picture. And I think that’s exactly what this song is really all about. And this song is called “Mistakes We Knew We Were Making.”

== Artwork ==
The artwork was designed by Ryan Clark at Invisible Creature.

== Awards ==
In 2006, the album was nominated for a Dove Award for Recorded Music Packaging of the Year at the 37th GMA Dove Awards.
