= Morning (Mae EP) =

EP by Mae
- Released: April 19, 2009
- Recorded: 2008–2009
- Genre: Emo-pop, indie rock, power pop
- Length: 37:03
- Label: Cell Records (a Tooth & Nail Records company)
- Producer: David Elkins

Mae chronology
Singularity (2007)	Morning (2009)	Afternoon (2009)

Professional ratings
Review scores
Source	Rating
Allmusic	3.5/5 stars
Alternative Press	2.5/5 stars
Cosmos Gaming	(favorable)

Morning (styled as (m)orning) is the third EP by American alternative/indie band Mae. It was released independently on April 19, 2009, in conjunction with Mae Presents: (M)orning tour. It contains songs played in concert in stereoscopic 3D. A limited edition scratch and sniff release of the EP, meant to smell like the ocean, was available only on the tour. The EP was released to stores on September 22, 2009, bundled with a DVD of tour and behind-the-scenes footage.

According to the band's post on their message board, "Morning represents the beginning of the day, the beginning of the year, and the beginning of a life ... [January - April] This is the season to focus on youth and help instill appreciation for music and the arts. Music is the world's language. It has the ability to bridge nations and to connect people ... These are the issues of Morning: (M)usic (A)rt (E)ducation". All proceeds from the EP will be donated to charities chosen by the fans.

== Track listing ==
All songs written by David Elkins, Zach Gehring & Jacob Marshall

1. "Good (m)orning" – 1:24
2. "The Fisherman Song (We All Need Love)" – 8:39
3. "The House That Fire Built" – 7:09
4. "Boomerang" – 4:38
5. "Two Birds" – 2:57
6. "A Melody, the Memory" – 4:34
7. "Night/Day" – 4:42
8. "(m)orning Drive" – 3:03
