= Cover Your Eyes =

Studio album by Sullivan
- Released: June 5, 2007
- Genre: Alternative rock, emo
- Label: Tooth & Nail Records
- Producer: James Paul Wisner

Sullivan chronology
Hey, I'm a Ghost (2006)	Cover Your Eyes (2007)	Undressed (2013)

Professional ratings
Review scores
Source	Rating
AbsolutePunk.net	(69%)
Allmusic	4.5/5 stars

Cover Your Eyes is the second album from Greensboro, North Carolina band Sullivan. The record debuted at #37 on the Billboard Top Heatseekers.

== Track listing ==
All songs written by Brooks Paschal, Zach Harward, Phil Chamberlain, Tyson Shipman and Jeremy Stanton.

1. "F-Stop" (3:08)
2. "Goodbye, Miss Havisham" (3:10)
3. "Tell Me I'm Wrong" (3:10)
4. "Great for My Collection" (3:11)
5. "Florida Queen" (3:13)
6. "Olive Branch" (3:49)
7. "The Process" (3:15)
8. "Dig Me Up" (4:04)
9. "Israel Hands" (3:25)
10. "Fire Away" (4:00)
