= Evening (EP) =

(e)vening
- cover of the early limited edition release

EP by Mae
- Released: 2011
- Genre: Emo-pop, indie rock, power pop
- Length: 37:10
- Label: Cell Records (a Tooth & Nail Records company)
- Producer: Mae

Mae chronology
Afternoon (2010)	(e)vening (2011)	Multisensory Aesthetic Experience (2018)

Professional ratings
Review scores
Source	Rating
Allmusic	3.5/5 stars

Evening (styled as (e)vening) is the third and final release in a series of EPs by American alternative/indie band Mae, following Morning and Afternoon. Copies of a limited release edition were available on the band's "Goodbye, Goodnight" tour. The EP was released in stores on March 8, 2011, bundled with a DVD recorded at the band's farewell show in Norfolk, VA.

== Track listing ==
No.	Title	Length
1.	"A Quiet (e)vening"	1:58
2.	"Bloom"	4:44
3.	"I Just Needed You to Know"	4:17
4.	"My Favorite Dream"	4:24
5.	"Seasons: i. Departure"	4:58
6.	"Seasons: ii. Initiation"	4:46
7.	"Seasons: iii. Return"	3:52
8.	"Sleep Well"	4:13
9.	"Good (e)vening"	3:56

== DVD Track listing ==
No.	Title	Length
1.	"Start"	1:33
2.	"Bloom"	4:41
3.	"Anything"	3:50
4.	"Embers and Envelopes"	4:45
5.	"The Everglow"	3:43
6.	"Suspension"	4:34
7.	"Breakdown"	7:16
8.	"Night/Day"	4:51
9.	"I Just Needed You to Know"	4:28
10.	"Soundtrack for Our Movie"	3:52
11.	"The Ocean"	6:52
12.	"Giving it Away"	5:55
13.	"Mistakes We Knew We Were Making"	6:37
14.	"Just Let Go"	6:08
15.	"Sleep Well"	6:34
16.	"Summertime"	4:00
17.	"Tisbury Lane"	9:35
18.	"The Fisherman's Song"	9:29
19.	"Sun"	6:06
20.	"We're So Far Away"	4:19
21.	"Someone Else's Arms"	6:24
22.	"Closing Credits"	1:46

Note: The numbering of the track list contained in the DVD menu starts at 0.
