= Destination: Beautiful =

Studio album by Mae
- Released: February 25, 2003
- Recorded: Earthsound Recording (Chesapeake, Virginia)
- Genre: Emo, indie rock, pop punk
- Length: 48:19
- Label: Tooth & Nail Records (Original release); Spartan / Cell Records (Vinyl release)
- Producer: Mae

Mae chronology
Destination: Beautiful (2003)	Destination: B-Sides (2004)

Professional ratings
Review scores
Source	Rating
Allmusic	3/5 stars
Jesus Freak Hideout	4/5 stars

Destination: Beautiful is the full-length debut album by the American alternative/indie band Mae. It was released on February 25, 2003, on Tooth & Nail Records.

In 2012, Spartan Records released Destination: Beautiful on vinyl for the first time.

== Track listing ==
1. "Embers and Envelopes" (Gimenez) – 4:18
2. "This Time Is the Last Time" (Gimenez) – 3:50
3. "All Deliberate Speed" (Gimenez) – 5:09
4. "Runaway" (Gimenez) – 3:45
5. "Sun" (Gimenez) – 5:08
6. "Last Call" (Gimenez, Marshall) – 3:35
7. "Skyline Drive" (Gimenez) – 5:59
8. "Soundtrack for Our Movie" (Gimenez) – 3:13
9. "Summertime" (Gimenez, Marshall, Mae) – 4:06
10. "Giving It Away" (Gimenez) – 5:27
11. "Goodbye, Goodnight" (Gimenez) – 4:48

== Personnel ==
- William Clark – bass
- Alan Douches – mastering
- John T. Frazier – A&R
- Chad Johnson – A&R
- Mae – producer, engineer, art direction, mixing
- Tim Owen – photography
