= Afternoon (EP) =

EP by Mae
- Released: September 24, 2009
- Recorded: 2008–2009
- Genre: Indie rock, power pop, pop punk
- Length: 40:43
- Label: Cell Records (a Tooth & Nail Records company)

Mae chronology
Morning (2009)	Afternoon (2009)	Evening (2011)

Professional ratings
Review scores
Source	Rating
Allmusic	3.5/5 stars

Afternoon (styled as (a)fternoon) is the fourth EP by American alternative/indie band Mae. It was released independently on September 24, 2009, in conjunction with Mae Presents: Afternoon Tour. As with their previous releases, it contains songs that will be played in concert in stereoscopic 3D. As of August, Mae updated their website and said, "joining us [on tour] will be our new friends in Locksley September 24-October 21, Jenny Owen Youngs October 22-November 8, and Deas Vail. The Afternoon Tour will feature all new 3D projection, the official release of the limited edition 'rub and smell' afternoon EP"

== Track listing ==
All tracks by Mae

1. "Good (a)fternoon" – 3:27
2. "Over & Over" – 5:40
3. "The Fight Song (Crash and Burn)" – 7:06
4. "In Pieces" – 5:31
5. "The Cure" – 4:08
6. "Falling Into You" – 4:44
7. "Communication" – 7:24
8. "(a)fternoon in Eden" – 2:43

== Personnel ==
- David Elkins: (born Dave Gimenez Vox, Electric & Acoustic Guitar, Ebow, Organ, Keys, Piano, Toy Piano, Fender Rhodes, Percussion, Drums & Programming, Strings
- Zach Gehring: Electric & Acoustic Guitar, Ebow, Percussion
- Jacob Marshall: Drums
- Mark Padgett: Bass, Programming
- Tom Lorsch: Strings
- Dennis Wage: B3 Harmond Organ/Piano
- Choir: Mark Kalagay, Andrew D. Vaught, Sean Postanowicz, Eric Godsey, Maiya Cabrero, Matthew Robinson, Vincent Jones, TuanAnh Vu, Cara Vu, Vicki Imperial, Paul Atienza, Micah Marshall, Kenny Marshall
