= Quiet Mouth Loud Hands =

Studio album by Damiera
- Released: June 24, 2008
- Recorded: 2007/2008
- Genre: Experimental rock, indie rock, progressive rock, math rock
- Label: Equal Vision Records
- Producer: Jayson Dezuzio

Damiera chronology
| M(US)IC (2007) | Quiet Mouth Loud Hands (2008) |

Quiet Mouth Loud Hands is the second and last studio album by the indie rock band Damiera. It was released in 2008 on Equal Vision Records.

== Reception ==
Professional ratings
Review scores
| Source | Rating |
|---|---|
| AbsolutePunk.net | (83%) |
| The Album Project | 4/5 stars |

== Track listing ==
1. "Rainman" - 0:45
2. "Quiet Mouth Loud Hands" - 3:38
3. "Nailbiter" - 3:43
4. "Image and Able" - 3:02
5. "Teacher, Preacher" - 3:10
6. "Weights for the Waiting" - 3:20
7. "Chromatica" - 3:11
8. "Blinding Sir Bluest" - 2:45
9. "Woodbox" - 1:56
10. "Silvertongue" - 3:09
11. "Trading Grins" - 2:41

Full Length 31:20
