= Hey, I'm a Ghost =

Studio album by Sullivan
- Released: January 24, 2006
- Genre: Alternative rock, emo
- Label: Tooth & Nail Records
- Producer: Matt Goldman

Sullivan chronology
Count the Time in Quarter Tones EP (2002)	Hey, I'm a Ghost (2006)	Cover Your Eyes (2007)

Professional ratings
Review scores
Source	Rating
AbsolutePunk.net	(49%)
Allmusic	3.5/5 stars

Hey, I'm a Ghost is the first full-length album from Greensboro, North Carolina band Sullivan.

== Track listing ==
All songs written by Brooks Paschal, Zach Harward, Phil Chamberlain and Tyson Shipman.

1. "Down Here, We All Float" (4:26)
2. "Ten Ways to Impress" (3:52)
3. "Cloudy" (3:49)
4. "The Charity of Saint Elizabeth" (5:55)
5. "Cars at Break-Neck Speeds" (4:09)
6. "Gardens" (2:45)
7. "Insurance for the Weak" (3:17)
8. "How I Remember You" (4:09)
9. "Promise Me" (3:34)
10. "Under the Watchful Eyes of Dr. T.J. Eckleburg" (1:00)
11. "Hey, I'm a Ghost" (3:55)

The title "Under the Watchful Eyes of Dr. T.J. Eckleburg" is a reference to F. Scott Fitzgeralds' novel The Great Gatsby. "Down Here, We All Float" is a reference to Stephen King's It.
