= From Toledo to Tokyo =

Video by Mae
- Released: June 13, 2005
- Genres: Indie rock, emo, pop-punk
- Length: 165 minutes
- Label: Astorya Entertainment
- Producers: Mae and Brett Brownell

Mae chronology
Destination: B-Sides (2004)	From Toledo to Tokyo (2005)	The Everglow (2005)

From Toledo to Tokyo is a DVD released by American Alternative rock/indie group Mae. It is a documentary/live performance of the Japan tour.

The name of the DVD is derived from a lyric taken from "We're So Far Away", the second track on their CD The Everglow.

Professional ratings
Review scores
Source	Rating
Decapolis	4/5 stars

== Sections ==
- Documentary spanning Mae's first year of tour (100 minutes)
  - Interviews with the band
  - Live performances
  - Fans
  - Band History
  - Snow Storms
  - Appearances by:
    - Something Corporate
    - The Starting Line
    - Copeland
    - And More
- Live performance from Mae's hometown venue (40 minutes)
  - Futuro
  - All Deliberate Speed
  - Runaway
  - Anything
  - Skyline Drive
  - Sun
  - Soundtrack for Our Movie
  - Summertime
- Documentary capturing Mae's first tour in Japan (25 minutes)
  - This Time Is the Last Time
  - Suspension
  - Embers and Envelopes
