= M(US)IC =

Studio album by Damiera
- Released: January 23, 2007
- Recorded: 2006
- Genre: Experimental rock, indie rock, math rock
- Label: Equal Vision Records, Vega Vinyl
- Producer: Jayson Dezuzio

Damiera chronology
M(US)IC (2007)	Quiet Mouth Loud Hands (2008)

M(US)IC (meant to be pronounced "Us in Music") was released by Damiera in 2006 under indie record label, Tamerlane Recordings. It was re-released on Equal Vision Records January 23, 2007. This is the band's first full-length album. The album was released on vinyl by Vega Vinyl on May 14, 2009.

== Reception ==
Professional ratings
Review scores
Source	Rating
*Absolutepunk.net	(93%) link
Allmusic	link

== Track listing ==
1. "Immure" – 3:16
2. "Lessons" – 3:38
3. "M(US)IC" – 3:22
4. "Via Invested" – 3:13
5. "I AM Pulse" – 3:09
6. "Ember Eason" – 3:39
7. "Departures" – 1:59
8. "Flora: Yield" – 3:52
9. "Broken Hands" – 3:27
10. "Obsessions" – 3:00

== Recording ==
- David Raymond - Vocals/Guitar
- Mark Henry - Vocals/Bass
- Rock Whittington - Guitar
- Bradley McRae - Drums
- Production - Jayson Dezuzio
