= Sullivan (band) =

American rock band

- Origin: Greensboro, North Carolina, U.S.
- Genres: Alternative rock, emo (early)
- Years active: 2001–2007, 2013-present
- Labels: Forsaken Recordings, Tooth & Nail, independent, Spartan Records
- Members: Brooks Paschal; Zach Harward; Phil Chamberlain; Tyson Shipman; Jeremy Stanton
- Past members: Mike Lawrence; Charles Crossingham

Sullivan is an American rock band from Greensboro, North Carolina, United States.

Sullivan was involved in To Write Love on Her Arms.

== History ==
Sullivan came together as a trio in 2001. In 2002 they recorded and released Count the Time in Quarter Tones on Forsaken/Tribunal Records. The EP sold well and extensive touring followed. They were subsequently signed to the Tooth & Nail Records label. In 2006, now as a four piece band consisting of Brooks Paschal on lead vocals/rhythm guitar, Zach Harward on bass, Phil Chamberlain on the drums and Tyson Shipman on lead guitar, they released their international debut Hey, I'm a Ghost which featured the single "Down Here, We All Float". They released their second album Cover Your Eyes on June 5, 2007, with new guitarist Jeremy Stanton.

Phil Chamberlain's brother Spencer Chamberlain is the screaming lead vocalist portion of Underoath. They were also in the metalcore band This Runs Through (along with current Sullivan guitarist Tyson Shipman) previous to their current musical projects.

Former Sullivan drummer Mike Lawrence has played drums in Tribunal Records metalcore band Heartscarved and played guitar and keyboards in Curse Your Name.

The band split up in late 2007 while still on their headlining "Cover Your Eyes Tour". The band posted a blog in which they revealed they "didn't want things to come to this", but that "the best course of action for our members is to disband" even though there was "no bad blood between any of us."

Paschal, Shipman, and Stanton then joined The Afterlife Kids. They released a self-titled EP in 2010. Brooks Paschal has also released music as a solo artist under his stage name Surprises.

On October 13, 2013, the band uploaded a new song called "Profile" to their YouTube account. An acoustic EP featuring versions of five songs from the band's previous records entitled Undressed was released on November 27, 2013. The band then announced in the summer of 2014 that they had signed to Spartan Records. They released the album Heavy Is The Head on December 9, 2014.

== Members ==
- Brooks Paschal - lead vocals (Also currently in The Afterlife Kids and Surprises)
- Phil Chamberlain - drums (ex-This Runs Through, also currently in To Speak of Wolves)
- Zach Harward - bass
- Tyson Shipman - guitars (ex-This Runs Through, also currently in The Afterlife Kids)
- Jeremy Stanton - guitars (Also currently in The Afterlife Kids)

Former

- Mike Lawrence - drums
- Charles Crossingham - bass

== Discography ==
- Count the Time in Quarter Tones (EP, Forsaken Recordings, 2003)
- Hey, I'm a Ghost (Tooth & Nail, January 24, 2006)
- Cover Your Eyes (Tooth & Nail, June 5, 2007)
- Undressed (EP, independent, November 27, 2013)
- Heavy Is the Head (Spartan, December 9, 2014)

=== Singles ===
Year	Title	Chart Positions			Album
Year	Title	US Hot 100	US Modern Rock	US Mainstream Rock	Album
2006	"Down Here, We All Float"	25			Hey, I'm a Ghost
2007	"The Process"	35	27		Cover Your Eyes
