= Shy, Low =

American post-rock band

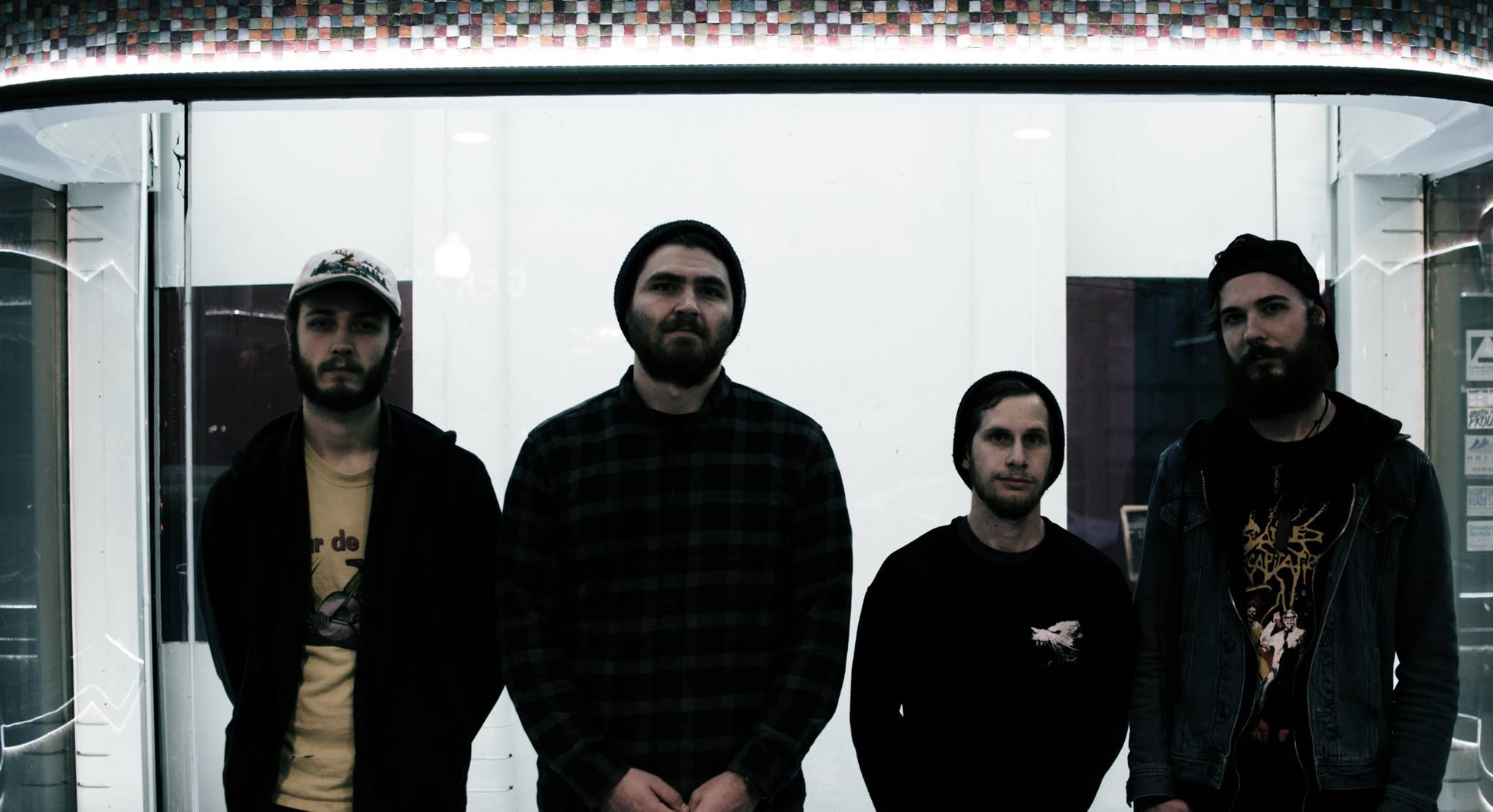

Background information
- Origin: Richmond, Virginia, United States
- Genres: Post-rock, Post-metal
- Years active: 2011–present
- Label: Pelagic Records
- Members: Gregg Peterson; Zakaree Bryant; Drew Storcks; Dylan Partridge; Kai Zamora
- Past members: Sean Doody; Shaun Reeves; Ian Currie
- Website: http://instagram.com/shylow

Shy, Low is an American post-rock and post-metal band from Richmond, Virginia/Providence, Rhode Island/Los Angeles, California. The band's current line up consists of Zak Bryant (guitar), Gregg Peterson (guitar), Kai Zamora (Guitar), Drew Storcks (bass) and Dylan Partridge (drums).

== History ==
The band was formed in January 2011 after the breakup of the metal-inspired group Vessel.

After spending several months writing during the winter of 2011, Shy, Low recorded their six-song debut with Allen Bergendahl of Viking Recording in May 2011 in Richmond, Virginia. Upon the completion of the album's recording, the band embarked on their first tour.

In September 2011, Shy, Low was signed by indie music label Fluttery Records that released the band's debut self-titled album on January 20, 2012. On May 22, 2013, it was announced that Shy, Low had signed with Seattle-based record label, Spartan Records. Spartan Records released the band's second record, Binary Opposition, on June 25, 2013 on limited edition colored marble vinyl as well as digitally. The record also featured a previously unreleased bonus track, "Voyager." After the release, Shy, Low went on a second tour in the Eastern United States. Due to selling out the vinyl Spartan Records began a second pressing of the vinyl in 2014.

On September 18, 2015, it was announced that Shy, Low would be releasing their third studio album (and second full-length record) titled Hiraeth through Spartan Records. The album was released on November 13, 2015.

The band released their second extended play and fourth studio album, Burning Day, on July 7, 2017 through Spartan Records. Early reviews indicate a marked stylistic change in the band's instrumentation, referring to the EP's sound as characteristically more post-metal than previous releases.

In May 2019, the band completed a 30-day European tour in conjunction with their appearance at both Dunk!Fest and Post In Paris Fest, which allowed for a sharing of the stage with bands including Wang Wen, Ingrina, Staghorn, VAR. Dylan Partridge (The Hurt Ensemble/Losst) was hired to drum on the tour, as they had recently found themselves without a permanent drummer. Upon arriving home, the band collected unused song ideas and began a strong push into writing their next full-length release.

Between July and December 2019, the band did an extensive amount of pre-production for ten songs, heavily relying on the aid of software drum programming and amp simulation plug-ins in order to hear their song ideas in ways that resembled polished recordings. Halfway through the pre-production process, the band made contact with Long Island based producer/mixing engineer, Mike Watts (The Dillinger Escape Plan, Glassjaw, Hopesfall, O'Brother). After a series of phone calls, Watts was ultimately chosen to produce and mix the record, as the band felt he would be their best option in bringing their vision of a heavily layered and more intricate sound to fruition.

In March 2020, the band spent an entire month recording their next release, "Snake Behind the Sun," during the onset of the COVID-19 pandemic in the U.S. Dylan Partridge was hired again to record drums for the album, using the band's pre-production software drums as a loose template for building upon. After Partridge put his own spin on the material, completing the drums for ten songs in three days, the band spent the remainder of March focusing on bass and guitar tracking. The engineering stage of the album was finished on March 29, 2020, as rumors of a New York State lockdown were rumored to take effect. (Partridge would join Shy, Low as a full band member at some point between this album's recording and release.)

In the spring of 2021, Shy, Low announced their signing with Pelagic Records (The Ocean, MONO, Envy). On the same day, Roadburn Festival premiered an exclusive sneak peek of a music video for a new single, "Helioentropy." The video was entirely self-funded and self-produced by the band, and directed by bass player Drew Storcks. On August 11, 2021, the video and track were officially released as promotional material for the band's upcoming record. Two more singles would follow, "The Beacon" on September 2, 2021, with video by guitarist Zak Bryant, and "Umbra" on September 22, 2021, with video by Zak Bryant and Drew Storcks.

In the wake of the Pelagic Records signing announcement, the band additionally released a remixed version of "Algos," created by Ryan Osterman of Holy Fawn with an accompanying visualizer by guitarist Zak Bryant.

"Snake Behind the Sun" was released on October 8, 2021 through Pelagic Records. A live performance of the full album (recorded August 28, 2021) premiered on YouTube on November 19, 2021, before its full (albeit digital-only) release on December 23.

Their third EP and sixth studio recording, "Babylonica", was released on May 26, 2023.

== Personnel ==
- Gregg Peterson - Guitar
- Zakaree Bryant - Guitar
- Kai Zamora - Guitar
- Drew Storcks - Bass Guitar
- Dylan Partridge - Drums

== Discography ==
=== Studio Releases ===
==== LPs ====
- Shy, Low (2012)
- Hiraeth (2015)
- Snake Behind The Sun (2021)
  - "Helioentropy" (2021), video by Drew Storcks
  - "The Beacon" (2021), video by Zak Bryant
  - "Umbra" (2021), video by Zak Bryant and Drew Storcks

==== EPs ====
- Binary Opposition (2013)
- Burning Day (2017)
- Babylonica (2023)
  - "Instinctual Estrangement" (2023), video ft. Zak Bryant

==== Miscellaneous (Remixes, Non-Album Singles, & Other Short Releases) ====
- O Holy Night (2014)
  - also featured as track 8 on Homesick: A Spartan Records Christmas Album (2014)
- Algos (Holy Fawn Remix) (2021)
- Farewell: A New Beginning (I Hear Sirens Remix) (2022)
- Heavy Hands (The Introverts Remix) (2022)

=== Live Recordings ===
==== LPs ====
- Snake Behind the Sun (Live in Richmond, V.A.) (2021)

==== EPs & Singles ====
- Live on AuxSend.tv (2012)
- Shy, Low Live at Little Elephant (2014)
- Shy, Low Live at Little Elephant (Session #2) (2015)
