= Ourlives =

Icelandic rock band

- The cover of the first United States release

Background information
- Origin: Reykjavik, Iceland
- Genres: alternative rock, post-Britpop
- Years active: 2005-present
- Labels: Spartan Records
- Members: Jón Björn Árnason; Leifur Kristinsson; Garðar; Hálfdán
- Past members: Hákon Einar Júlíusson; Egill Kári Helgason
- Website: www.ourlivesiceland.com//

Ourlives is an Icelandic rock band that formed in Reykjavik Iceland in 2005.

== History ==
Jón Björn Árnason and Leifur Kristinsson formed Ourlives in 2005 and recorded demos for four years before releasing their first album in Iceland, We Lost the Race. Two songs from that album, "Núna" and "Out of Place" had good success on Icelandic radio. Two years later, in 2011, they released another album also exclusive to Iceland Den of Lions.

Their United States history began when CEO of Spartan Records John T. Frazier discovered them on a trip to Iceland. After signing them to Spartan Records they released a debut EP to the United States, Out of Place. After some rumors circulated about a second release to the United States of Den of Lions several nationally viewed television shows such as ABC's The Fosters, NBC's About a Boy and MTV's Awkward featured songs from the album before a release date had even been set. Currently it is available for pre order through spartan records and is set to be released on 14 October 2014 on limited edition vinyl and digital download.

== Discography ==
| Year | Album / Song | Country |
|---|---|---|
| 2009 | We Lost the Race | Iceland |
| 2011 | Den of Lions | Iceland |
| 2011 | Out of Place EP | United States |
| 2014 | "Too Much" (Single) | United States |
| 2014 | Den of Lions | United States |
| 2016 | Higher Hopes | United States |
