= Mae =

American rock band

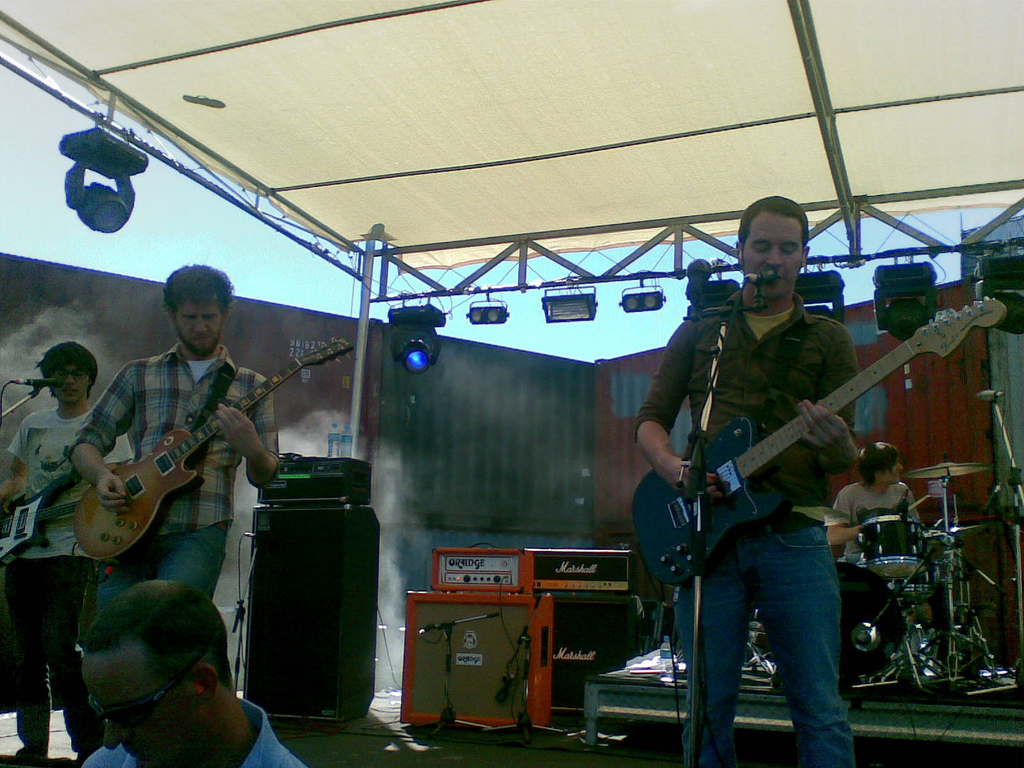
- Mae performing at the Soundwave festival 2008.

Background information
- Origin: Norfolk, Virginia, U.S.
- Genres: Indie rock; emo
- Years active: 2001–2010, 2013–present
- Labels: Tooth & Nail; Capitol; Cell; Spartan; Equal Vision
- Members: Dave Elkins; Zach Gehring
- Past members: Rob Sweitzer; Mark Padgett; William Clark; Jacob Clemons; Jacob Marshall
- Website: www.whatismae.com

Mae (stylized mae) is an American rock band that formed in Norfolk, Virginia in 2001. The band's name is an acronym for "Multisensory Aesthetic Experience", based on a course taken by drummer Jacob Marshall while a student at Old Dominion University.

== History ==
=== Early years with Tooth and Nail (2001–2006) ===
Jacob Marshall and Dave Elkins began what would become Mae by writing their first song, "Embers and Envelopes", in Marshall's living room. The band signed with Tooth and Nail Records and released their first album, Destination: Beautiful, in 2003. They released their second full-length album, The Everglow, in 2005. The band toured extensively to promote it, and also performed on the Vans Warped Tour. Mae re-released The Everglow in 2006, adding three new songs and a two-hour DVD.

=== Move to Capitol, Singularity, and (m)(a)(e) EPs (2006–2012) ===
Later in 2006, the band signed to Capitol Records for their third full-length album. Mae began recording the album in the fall of 2006, working with producer Howard Benson (who has produced albums for Saosin, My Chemical Romance, Blindside, and Relient K). The album, titled Singularity, was released on August 14, 2007. On June 19, 2007, the band released the first single from Singularity, "Sometimes I Can't Make It Alone".

On September 24, 2007 Padgett and Sweitzer parted ways with Mae. The following year, Mae announced that they had split ways with Capitol Records. They also stated that they would embark on a new, experimental project, releasing one new song for each month of 2009. Each song would be available to download on their website for a minimum donation of $1, with proceeds going to humanitarian projects of Mae's choosing.

In July 2009, Mae announced they were starting their own label called "Cell Records" through which they would release their three-EP set.

On May 7, 2010, word began spreading of Mark Padgett and Rob Sweitzer rejoining Mae for their upcoming fall tour. On June 19, 2010, Mae played a show in Singapore, the first show since 2007 that included both Mark Padgett and Rob Sweitzer. On June 22, 2010, Mae's Dave Elkins confirmed on the band's forums that Mark Padgett and Rob Sweitzer had reunited with Mae. On June 28, 2010, Mae announced that their upcoming "Goodbye, Goodnight" Tour would be their last for the foreseeable future, marking their indefinite hiatus. On August 23, 2010, the newly reunited Mae including Mark Padgett and Rob Sweitzer played their first show back home in the US at Eureka College in Eureka, Illinois, evidently gearing up for the Goodbye, Goodnight tour. On Saturday November 27, 2010, the band played what was billed as its last show at The NorVa. The show was filmed to be released on DVD. What were believed at the time to be Mae's actual final performances consisted of two shows played on February 23 and 24, 2011 at the Shibuya and Shinsaibashi locations of Club Quattro in Japan. However, in late December 2011, the band announced on its website that it would play eight shows in the UK and Europe as part of the Goodbye, Goodnight tour from January 3–10, 2012.

=== Continued touring, return to Tooth & Nail, Multisensory Aesthetic Experience, and signing to Equal Vision (2012–present) ===
On February 21–23, 2013, Mae played a three show tour to commemorate the 10-year anniversary of the band's album Destination: Beautiful. Two shows took place in Virginia Beach, Virginia, and one in Nashville, Tennessee. The shows consisted of the band playing their first album in its entirety. At the second Virginia Beach show, current E Street Band saxophonist and early Mae member Jacob Clemons made a guest appearance on the band's song "Tisbury Lane" during encore.

On June 7, 2014, Mae played an online show via stageit. During the concert it was announced that Mae would be reuniting in 2015 to complete a reunion tour in commemoration of the 10-year anniversary of The Everglow. They also confirmed that they were re-recording several songs for a pressing of Destination: B-Sides on vinyl rumored to be released via Spartan Records late in the summer of 2014.

Multisensory Aesthetic Experience was released on November 30, 2018 through the band's original record label, Tooth & Nail Records. The inspiration for this album came after the band had created a large-scale virtual reality experience at the Forbes Under30 Summit in Jerusalem. The event took place at the historic Tower of David. Dave Elkins recalled, "We performed in front of 650/700 people who all took their smartphones, put them in these cardboard viewfinders and all the visuals that they were seeing were in virtual reality 360 [which] were accommodating the music that we had written and recorded just to accommodate this experience."

On June 26, 2018, Mae announced a fall 2018 tour which included "MAE Day" in select cities. The "MAE Day" event consisted of a short video, discussion with the band, listening party, shared meal, VR experience, and additional multi-sensory experiences.

In September of 2023, Mae signed with Equal Vision Records.

== Members ==
Current

- Dave Elkins – lead vocals, guitar (2001–present)
- Zach Gehring – guitar (2003–present)

Touring musicians

- Josiah Schlater – bass (from the bands Tokyo and Color)
- Robert Smith – keyboards (from the bands Tokyo and Musicplayer)
- David Pogge – bass (for the (a)fternoon tour)
- Tyler Strickland – guitar (for the (a)fternoon tour)
- Matt Beck – guitar (initial tour, replaced by member Zach Gehring)
- Drew Smyser – bass and backing vocals (2017, 2023–present, from the band Whistler Lane)
- Geoffrey Mutchnik – keyboards (2018–2021)
- Kipp Wilde – keyboards (2017–2018, 2021–present, from the band Windsor Drive)
- Patrick Ryan – bass and guitar (mid 2017–2021)
- Josh Grigsby – drums (2021–present, from the band Houston Calls)
- Aaron Lachman – bass (2022)

Former

- Jacob Marshall – drums, percussion, piano (2001–2021)
- Mark Padgett – bass guitar (2002–2007, 2010–2015)
- Rob Sweitzer – keyboards (2002–2007, 2010–2015)
- William Clark – bass (2001–2002)
- Jake Clemons – saxophone (now of the E Street Band)

Timeline

=== Related projects ===
- Before forming Mae, Dave Elkins was a co-founder and lead vocalist for the indie band "Sky's the Limit". Two songs that Elkins originally wrote for Sky's the Limit have been recorded and released by Mae – "Skyline Drive", on Destination: Beautiful, and "Tisbury Lane", on Destination: B-Sides.
- After Mae finished their final tour, Dave Elkins began a new project called Schematic.
- Jacob Marshall has formed the band River James with members of the band Army of Me.
- In the fall of 2014, Mae keyboardist Rob Sweitzer announced a crowd-funding project for a solo record of his own, titled "M29", under the act name My God, It's Full of Stars.

== Discography ==
=== Studio albums ===
- Destination: Beautiful (2003)
- The Everglow (2005)
- Singularity (2007)
- Multisensory Aesthetic Experience (2018)

=== EPs and B-sides ===
- Mae EP (2002)
- Destination: B-Sides (2004)
- Sony Connect Set (2005)
- Live Music Series: Mae EP (2006)
- The Everglow EP (2006)
- Morning (2009)
- Afternoon (2009)
- Evening (2011)
- 3.0. (2018)

=== DVDs ===
- From Toledo to Tokyo (Astorya Entertainment, 2005)
- The Everglow: Special Edition DVD (Tooth & Nail Records, 2006)
- Destination: Beautiful Five Year Anniversary (Mae Recording Company, 2008)
- (M)orning (Cell Records, 2009)
- (A)fternoon (Cell Records, 2010)
- (E)vening (Cell Records, 2011)

=== Compilation appearances ===
- "Take Action! Vol. 4" (2004, contributed "Embers and Envelopes")
- Happy Christmas Vol. 4 (2005, contributed "Carol of the Bells")
- Punk Goes 90's (2006, contributed "March of the Pigs")

== Song of the Month ==
Throughout 2009, Mae released 'Songs of the Month' (proceeds benefiting Habitat for Humanity and Donorschoose.org), with the first four tracks going onto the (M)orning EP, the second set of four going onto the (A)fternoon EP, and the final four on the (E)vening EP:

- January: "The House that Fire Built"
- February: "Boomerang"
- March: "A Melody, The Memory"
- April: "Night/Day"
- May: "Over and Over"
- June: "The Cure"
- July: "The Fight Song"
- August: "In Pieces"
- September: "I Just Needed You To Know"
- October: "Seasons"
- ^{†}November: "Sleep Well"
- ^{†}December: "Bloom"
- † - Release delayed due to the theft of Mae's instruments and gear in Philadelphia
