= Spartan Records =

American record label

- Spartan Records Logo
- Founded: 2007; 19 years ago
- Founder: John T. Frazier
- Genre: Various
- Country of origin: United States
- Location: Seattle, Washington
- Official website: spartanrecords.com

Spartan Records was founded by John T. Frazier in Seattle, Washington in January 2007. It is currently home to the bands Schematic, Barren Womb, Ourlives, Shy, Low, and several others. Prior to founding Spartan, Frazier was the director of marketing at several preeminent independent record labels including Tooth and Nail Records, Solid State Records, and Drive-Thru Records. The label has been a full-time operation since January 2013. Spartan Records is known for its creative pressing of colored vinyl variants.

== Background ==
=== Formation ===
John T. Frazier has stated that Spartan Records got its inspirations from the mail-order record labels he bought from while growing up. He worked in college radio and received an internship at the major record label Geffen Records and worked as part of the street teams for several other labels. He started his career working for a small indie label called crank!. After working with several other labels including Tooth and Nail Records, Solid State Records and Drive-Thru Records, he founded Spartan Records in 2007; eventually leaving Tooth and Nail Records in December 2012 to work exclusively with Spartan Records.

=== Destination: Beautiful ===
Destination Beautiful Teal Variety 2nd pressing

The most successful release by Spartan Records has been their pressing of Mae's Destination: Beautiful. Their first pressing in 2012 involved a mix of 500 vinyl LPs including 200 white, 200 navy blue/white swirl, and 100 180 gsm black discs. After completely selling out the first pressing in 2012 they announced another pressing of 500 in 2013 on teal (100), white teal splatter (200) and Teal/white Swirl (200) these also sold out. Due to the popularity of this pressing they released another pressing of 500 copies on glow in the dark vinyl through Hot Topic and that pressing sold out quickly as well. In 2014, a fourth pressing of Destination: Beautiful was released as a part of Record Sale Day 2014 on Transparent Blue and gold vinyl. It was limited to 500 copies and has also sold out.

As a result of continued popularity of each successive pressing Spartan Records announced mae week. The week of May 19, 2014 spartan records announced that a fifth pressing of 500 vinyl copies would be sold 100 per day on five different variants. In addition to the daily release, 25 sets of all five variants sold out on the first day. Over the course of the week 100 Gold/White Swirl with Silver Splatter on the first day, 100 gold sold out on the second day, 100 blue white and clear LPs sold out on the third day, 100 copies on Milky Clear with White Splatter sold out on the fourth day and 100 White/Aqua Blue/Double Mint Tri-Color discs sold out the fifth day. In total, all 500 in the fifth pressing sold out during the course of mae week. In addition, the re-release of a style of mae shirt was sold as an extra to the vinyl. A sixth pressing of the vinyl is currently for sale on the Spartan Records website.

Additional mae records have been sold through Spartan Records such as The Everglow, the (m)(a)(e) anthology and most recently Our Love is a Painted Picture.

== Artists ==
This is a partial list of artists who currently, or have previously recorded for Spartan Records.

- American Opera
- Anchor & Braille
- Assertion
- Barren Womb
- Criteria
- Daisyhead
- Dearist
- Demons
- Fallow Land
- Florida Man
- Giants Chair
- Hidden Hospitals
- Honey and Salt
- Kiska
- Lights & Motion
- Lucky Scars
- JOKASH
- Mae
- Man Mountain
- Mountain Time
- My God, It's Full of Stars
- NYVES
- Over the Ocean
- Ourlives
- Reader
- Renaissance Fair
- Schematic
- Secret Stuff
- Sense Field
- Shiner
- Shy, Low
- Six Going on Seven
- Sky's the Limit
- Square Peg Round Hole
- States
- Subways on the Sun
- Sullivan
- Sundressed
- Surprises
- The Darling Fire
- The Farewell Bend
- The Foxery
- Trace Bundy
- Trespassers
- Unifier
- Unwed Sailor
- VAR
- Waypoint
- Young Fox

== See also ==
- Dave Elkins
- List of record labels
