= Evening (painting) =

Painting by Caspar David Friedrich

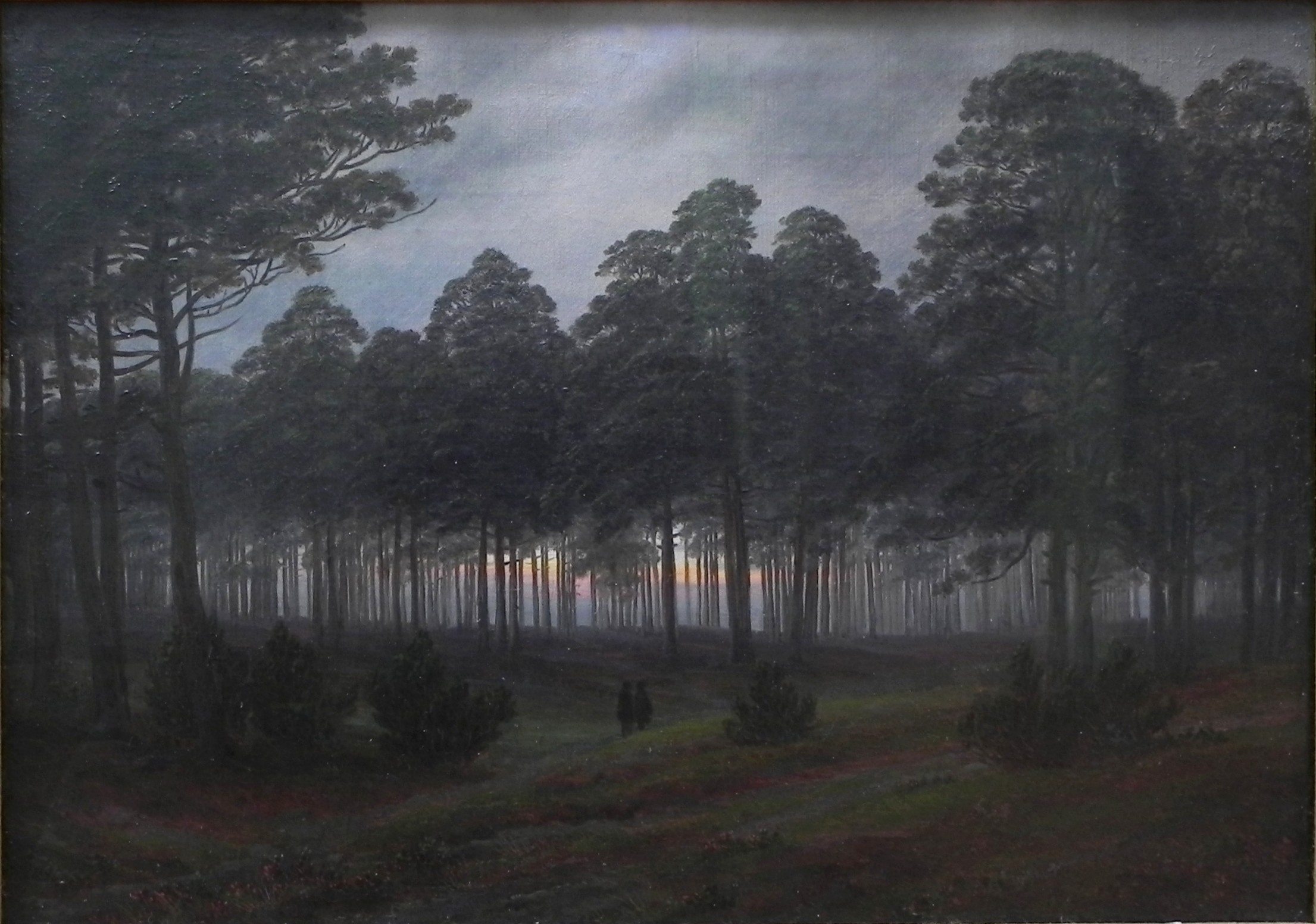
- Artist: Caspar David Friedrich
- Year: 1821
- Medium: oil on canvas
- Dimensions: 22.3 cm × 31 cm (8.8 in × 12 in)
- Location: Niedersächsisches Landesmuseum Hannover; Hannover

Evening (German - Der Abend) is an 1821 oil on canvas painting by Caspar David Friedrich, now in the Niedersächsischen Landesmuseum Hannover. With Morning, Midday and Afternoon, it forms a series on different times of day.

The whole canvas is filled by a pine forest, with a slightly wavy forest floor in brown-green tones with red blooming flowers and vanishing points to far left and far right. In the foreground is a clearing with pine bushes, a path leading diagonally from the left to centre and two figures in old German costume looking at the red and yellow sunset. Also in the background are light and dark clouds and a low horizon in the background.

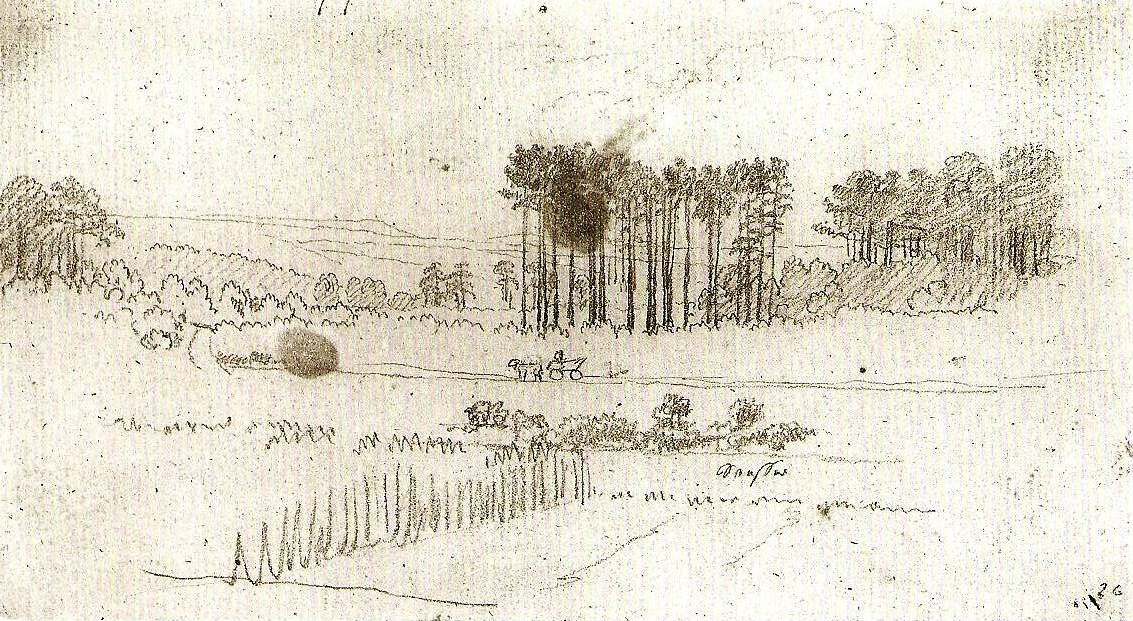
Caspar David Friedrich: Landscape with Tall Pines and a Horse-Drawn Carriage, c. 1798

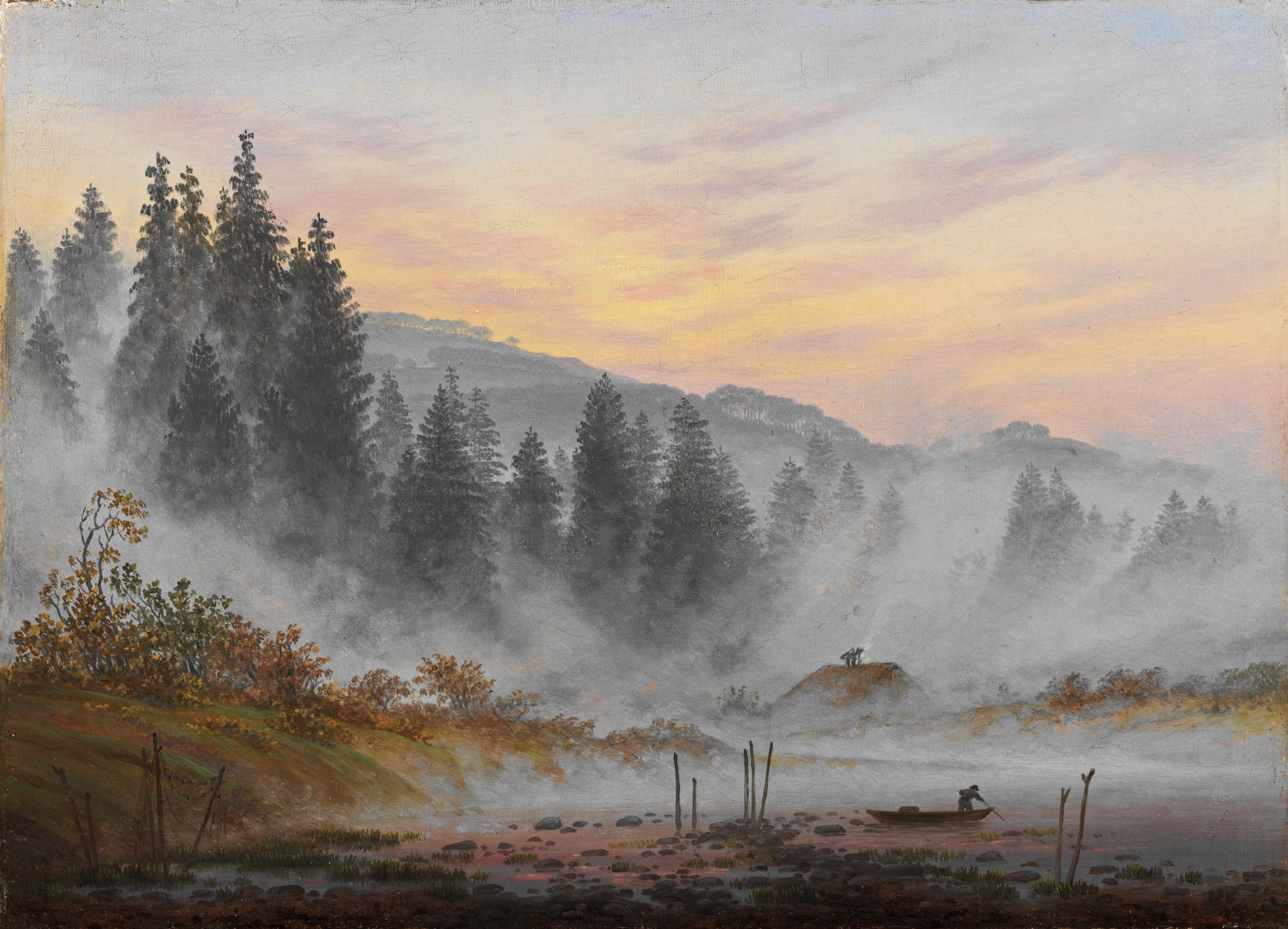
Caspar David Friedrich: Morning, 1821/22

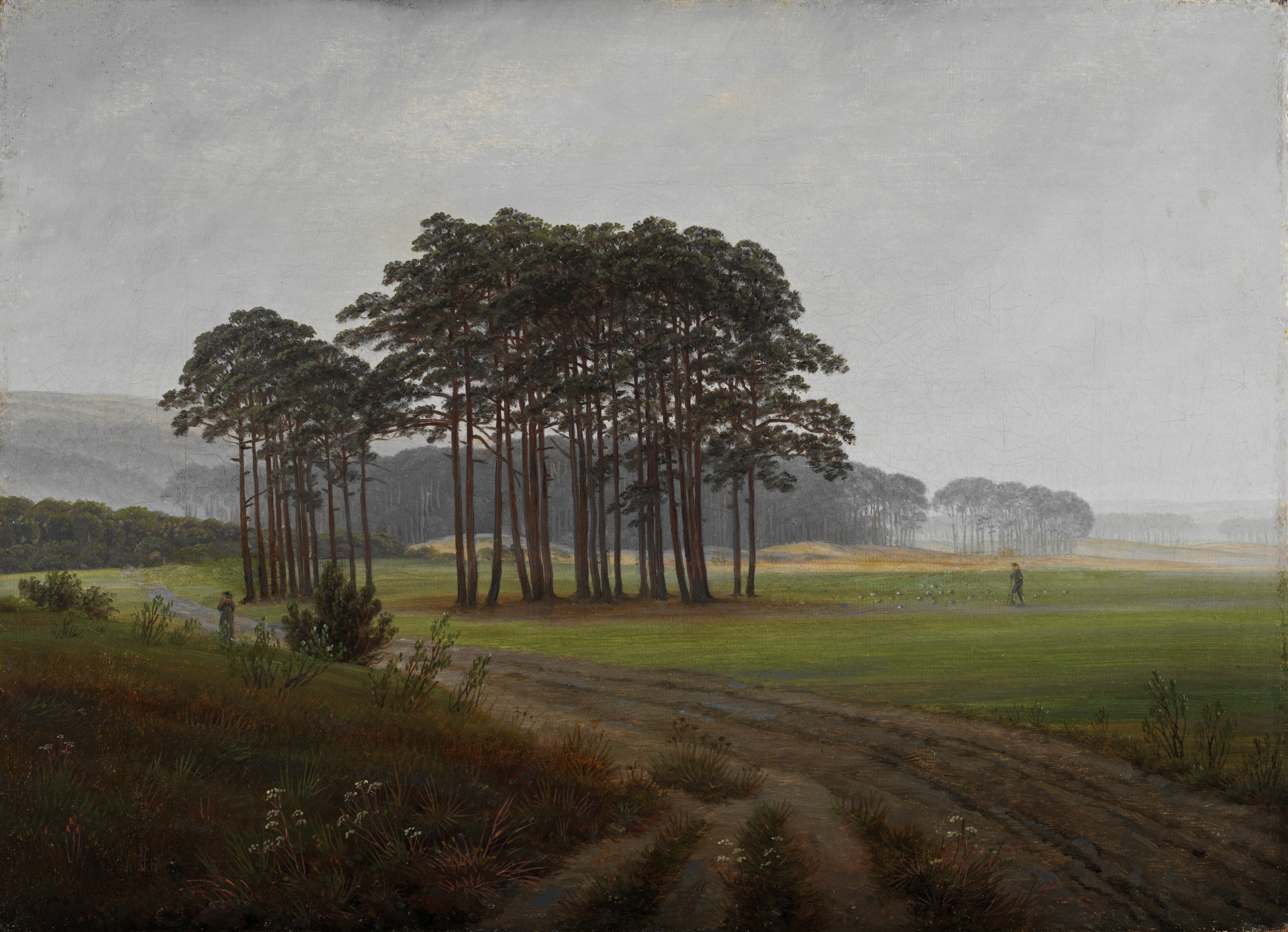
Caspar David Friedrich: Midday, 1821/22

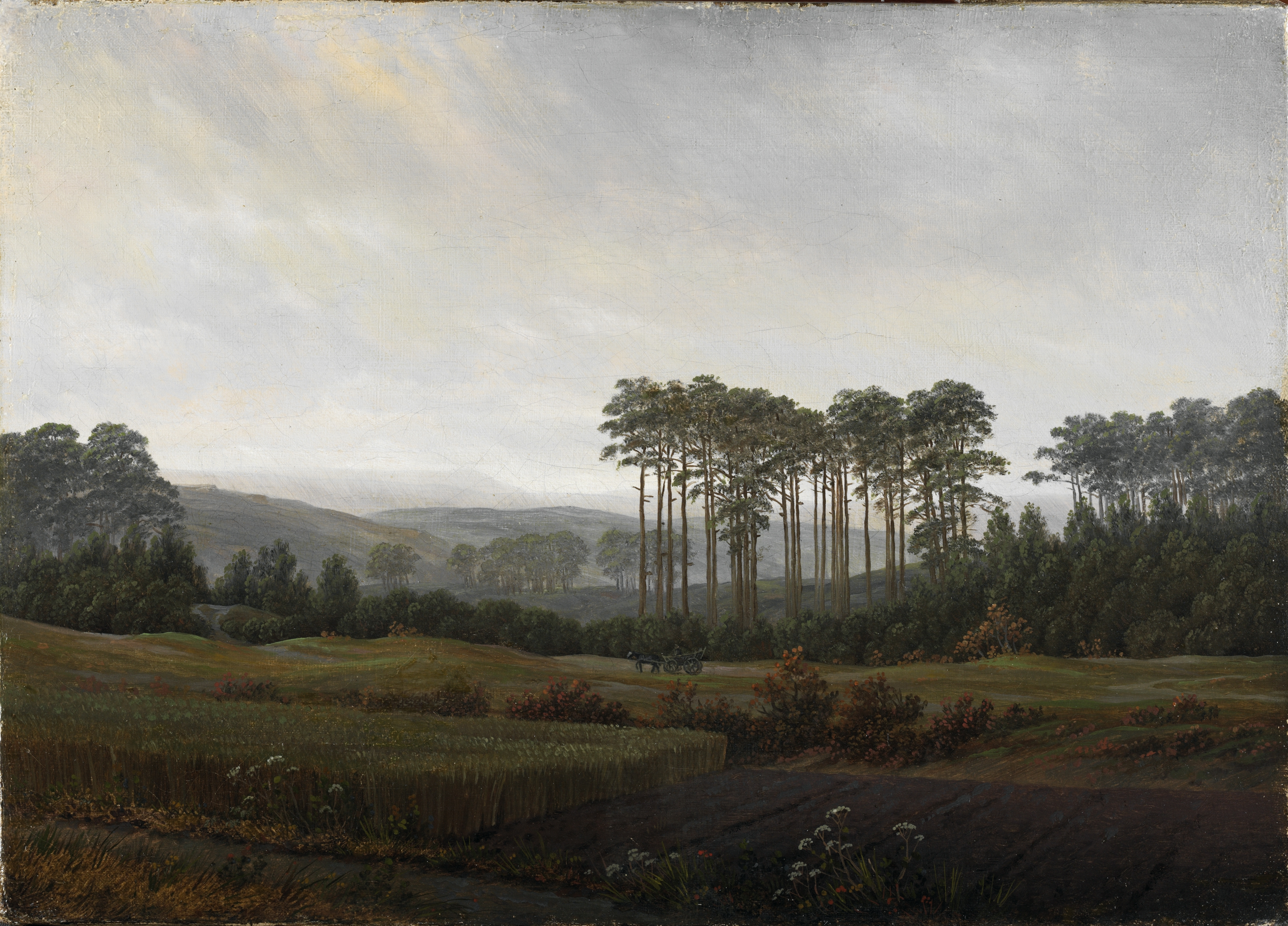
Caspar David Friedrich: Afternoon, 1821/22

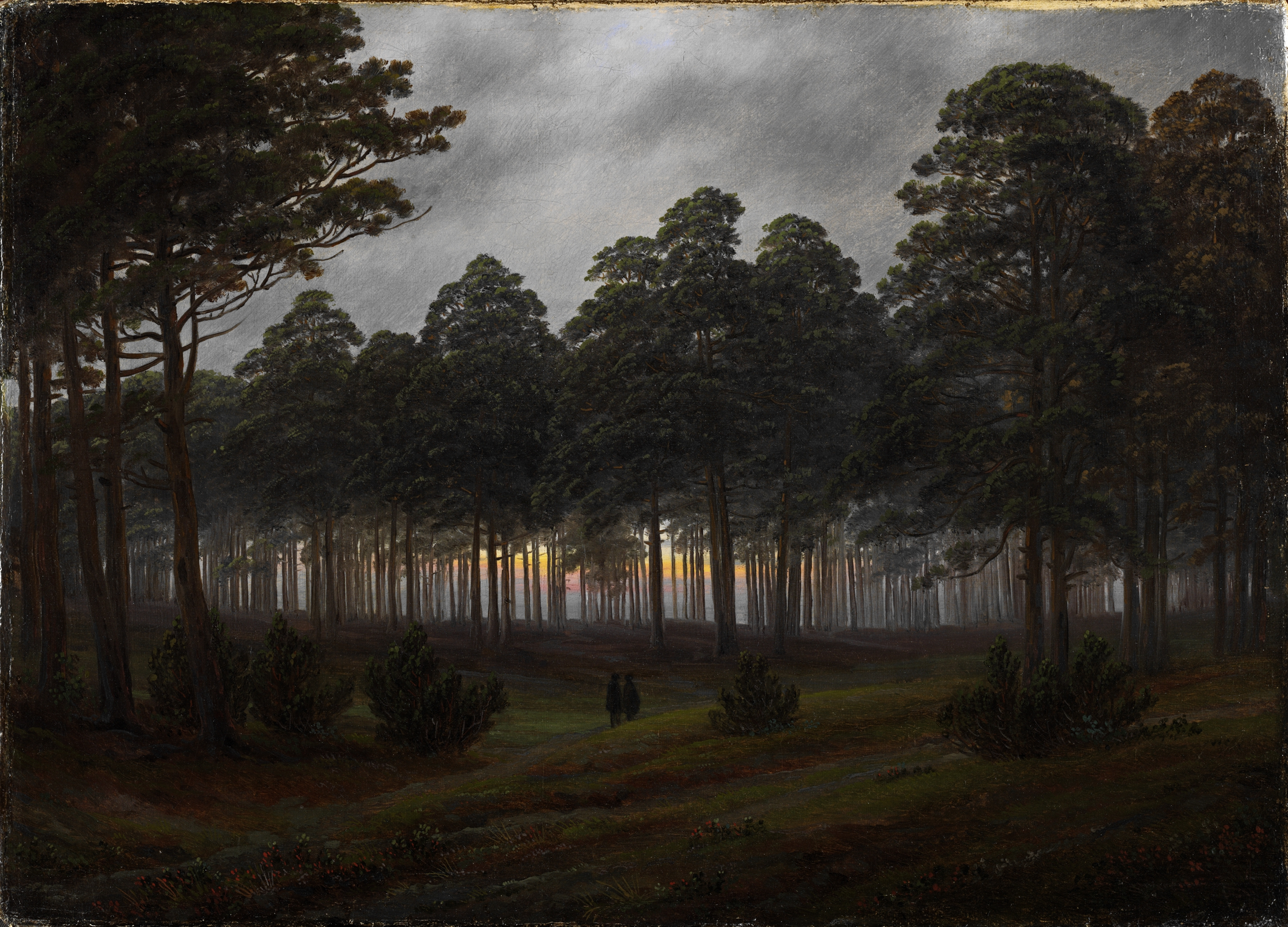
Caspar David Friedrich: Evening, 1821/22

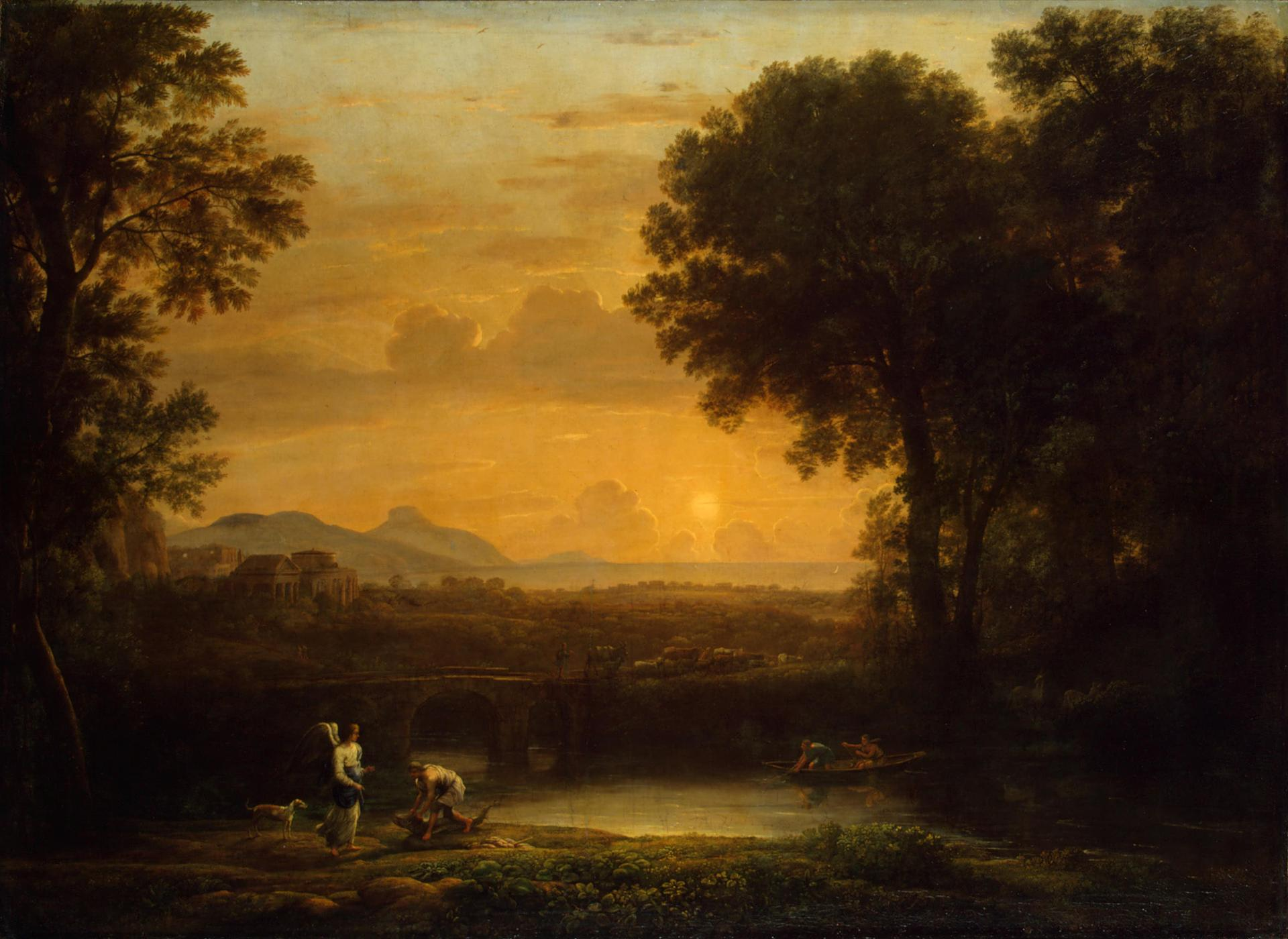
Claude Lorrain: Evening, 1666

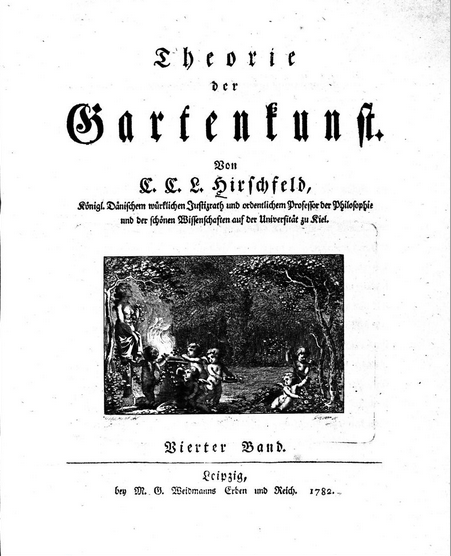
Hirschfeld's Theorie der Gartenkunst (Theory of Garden Art)

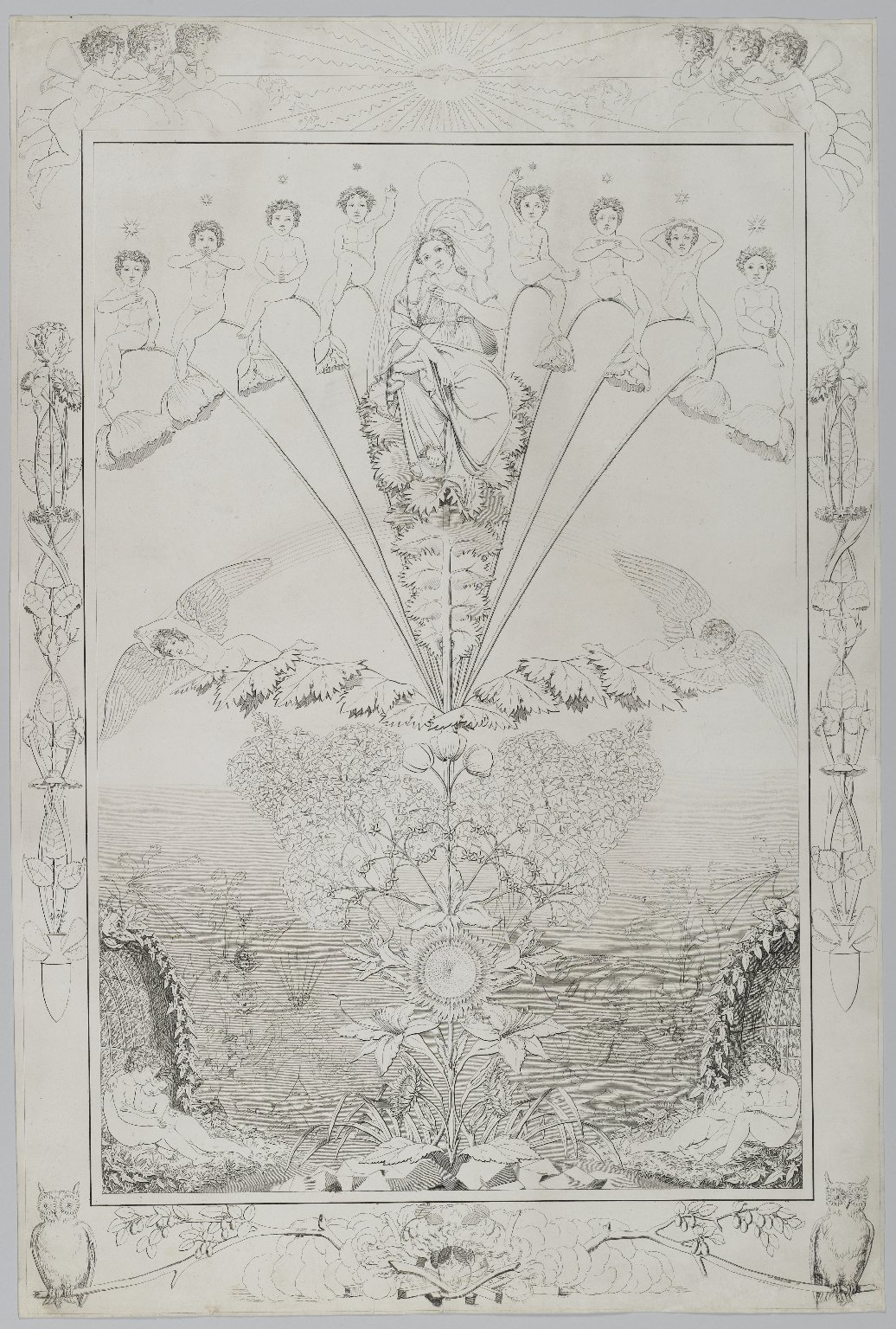
Philipp Otto Runge: Night, 1803

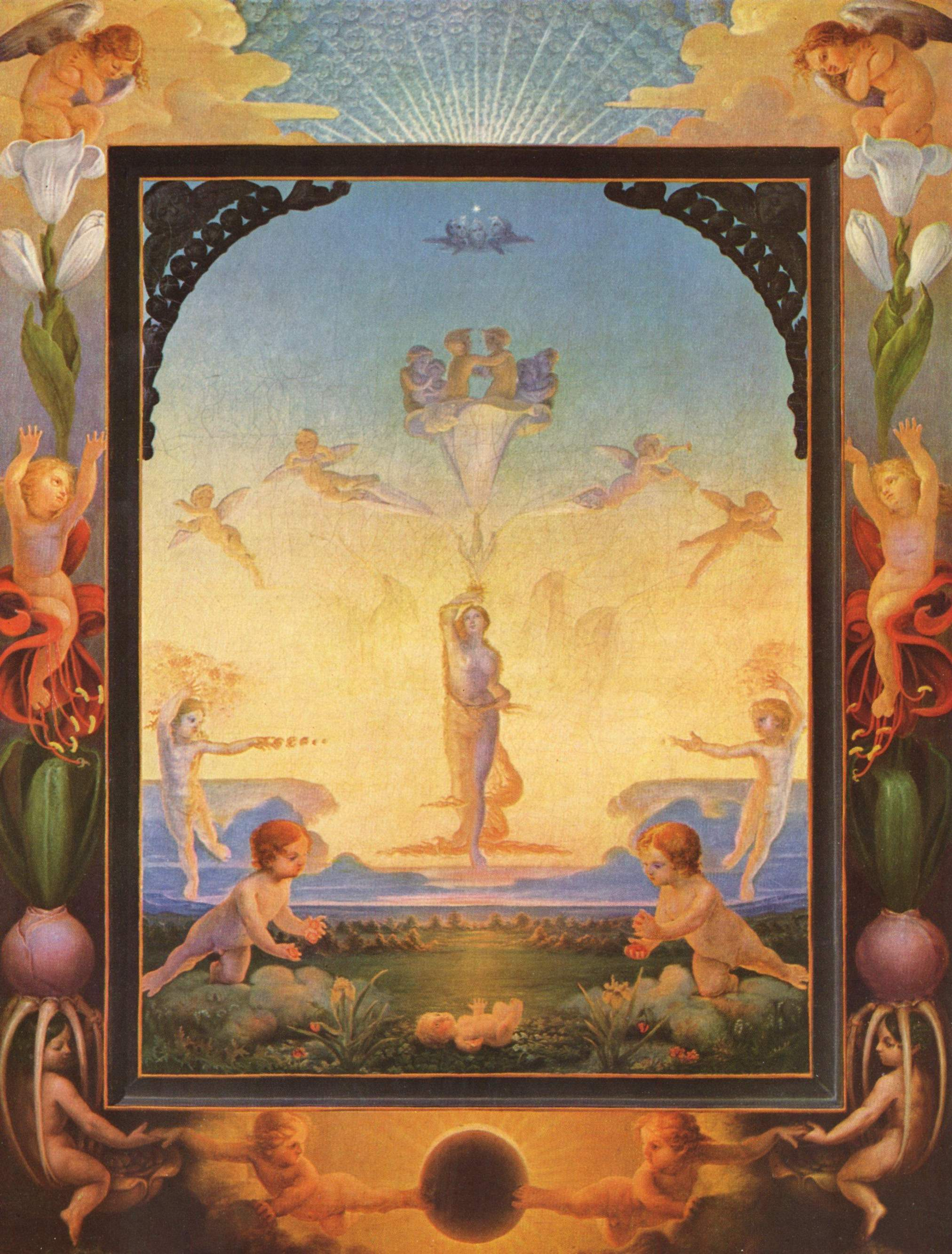
Philipp Otto Runge: Morning, 1808

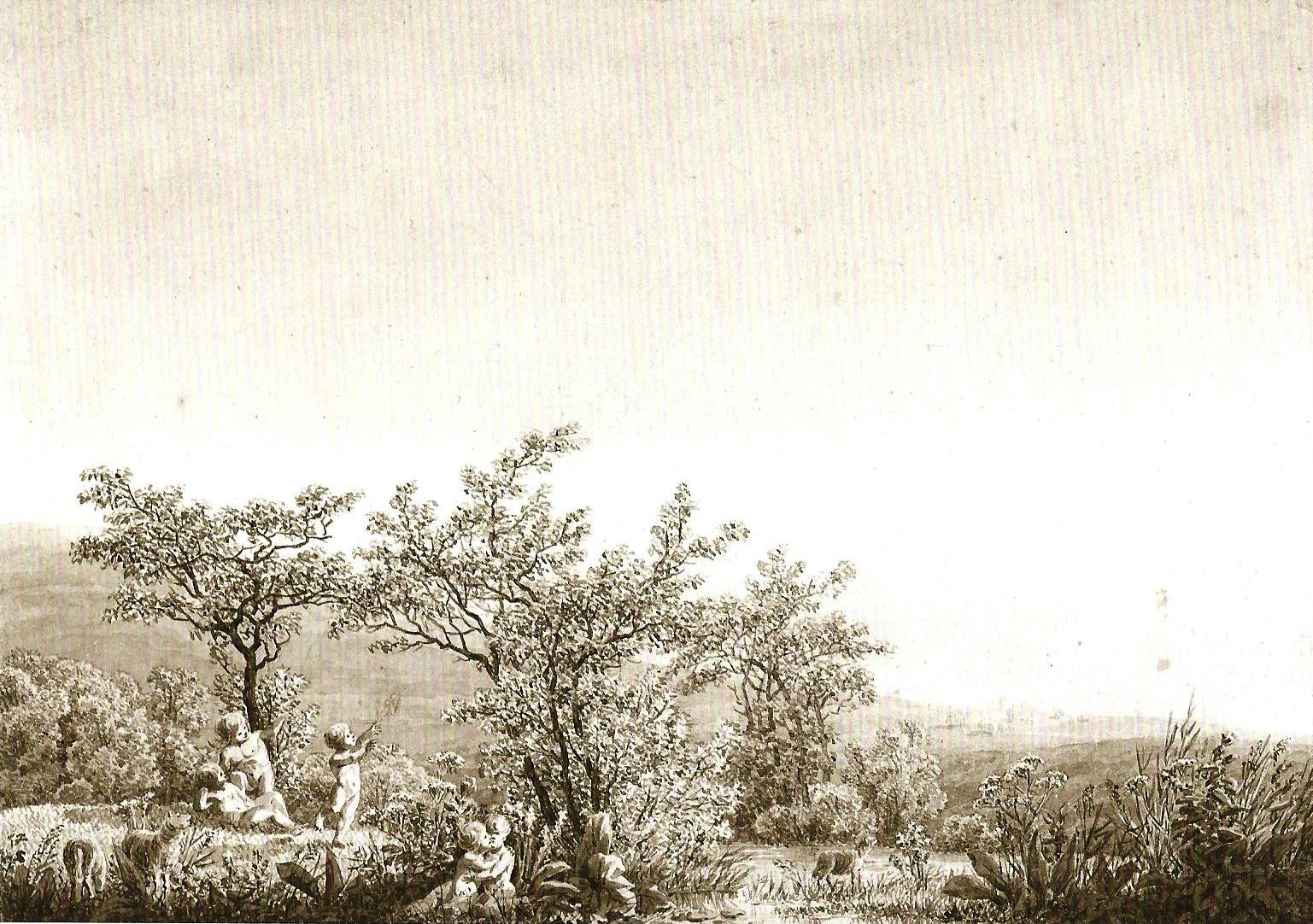
Caspar David Friedrich: Spring - Morning - Childhood, um 1803

== See also ==
- List of works by Caspar David Friedrich

== Bibliography (in German) ==
- Helmut Börsch-Supan, Karl Wilhelm Jähnig: Caspar David Friedrich. Gemälde, Druckgraphik und bildmäßige Zeichnungen, Prestel Verlag, München 1973, ISBN 3-7913-0053-9 (Werkverzeichnis)
- Hilmar Frank: Aussichten ins Unermessliche. Perspektivität und Sinnoffenheit bei Caspar David Friedrich. Akademie Verlag, Berlin 2004
- Willi Geismeier: Zur Bedeutung und entwicklungsgeschichtlichen Stellung von Naturgefühl und Landschaftsdarstellung bei Caspar David Friedrich. Dissertation, Berlin 1966
- Christina Grummt: Caspar David Friedrich. Die Zeichnungen. Das gesamte Werk. 2 Bde., München 2011
- Sigrid Hinz (ed.): Caspar David Friedrich in Briefen und Bekenntnissen. Henschelverlag Kunst und Gesellschaft, Berlin 1974
- Christian Cay Lorenz Hirschfeld: Theorie der Gartenkunst. Fünf Bände, M. G. Weidmanns Erben und Reich, Leipzig 1797 bis 1785
- Werner Hofmann: Caspar David Friedrich. Naturwirklichkeit und Kunstwahrheit. C.H. Beck Verlag, München 2000, ISBN 3-406-46475-0
- Jens Christian Jensen: Caspar David Friedrich. Leben und Werk. DuMont Verlag, Köln 1999
- Wieland Schmied: Caspar David Friedrich. Zyklus, Zeit und Ewigkeit. Prestel Verlag, München 1999
- Detlef Stapf: Caspar David Friedrichs verborgene Landschaften. Die Neubrandenburger Kontexte. Greifswald 2014, netzbasiert P-Book
- Herrmann Zschoche: Caspar David Friedrich. Die Briefe. ConferencePoint Verlag, Hamburg 2005, ISBN 3-936406-12-X
