= Hidden Hospitals =

US musical group

- Origin: Chicago, Illinois
- Genres: Progressive rock, Alternative rock
- Years active: 2011 – present
- Label: Unsigned
- Members: David Raymond (Vocals/Guitar); Jared Karns (Drums); Aaron Boynton (Bass)
- Past members: Steve Downs (Guitar); John Scott (Bass/Vocals)
- Website: Official website

Hidden Hospitals is an alternative progressive rock band from Chicago, Illinois. The band was originally formed from members of the bands Damiera and Kiss Kiss (band). They released their first EP, EP 001, in September 2011. They played their first show September 6, 2011 at the Bottom Lounge in Chicago. Their next album, EP 002, was released in October 2012. Hidden Hospitals has supported many national acts including Blindside (band), Hot Rod Circuit, Cartel (band), Middle Class Rut, Now, Now, Kevin Devine and The Used. 2013 saw the band release EP 001 + EP 002 on a combined vinyl and go on two national tours in support of the release. In 2015 band released their LP Surface tension.

== Discography ==
=== EP 001 (2011) ===
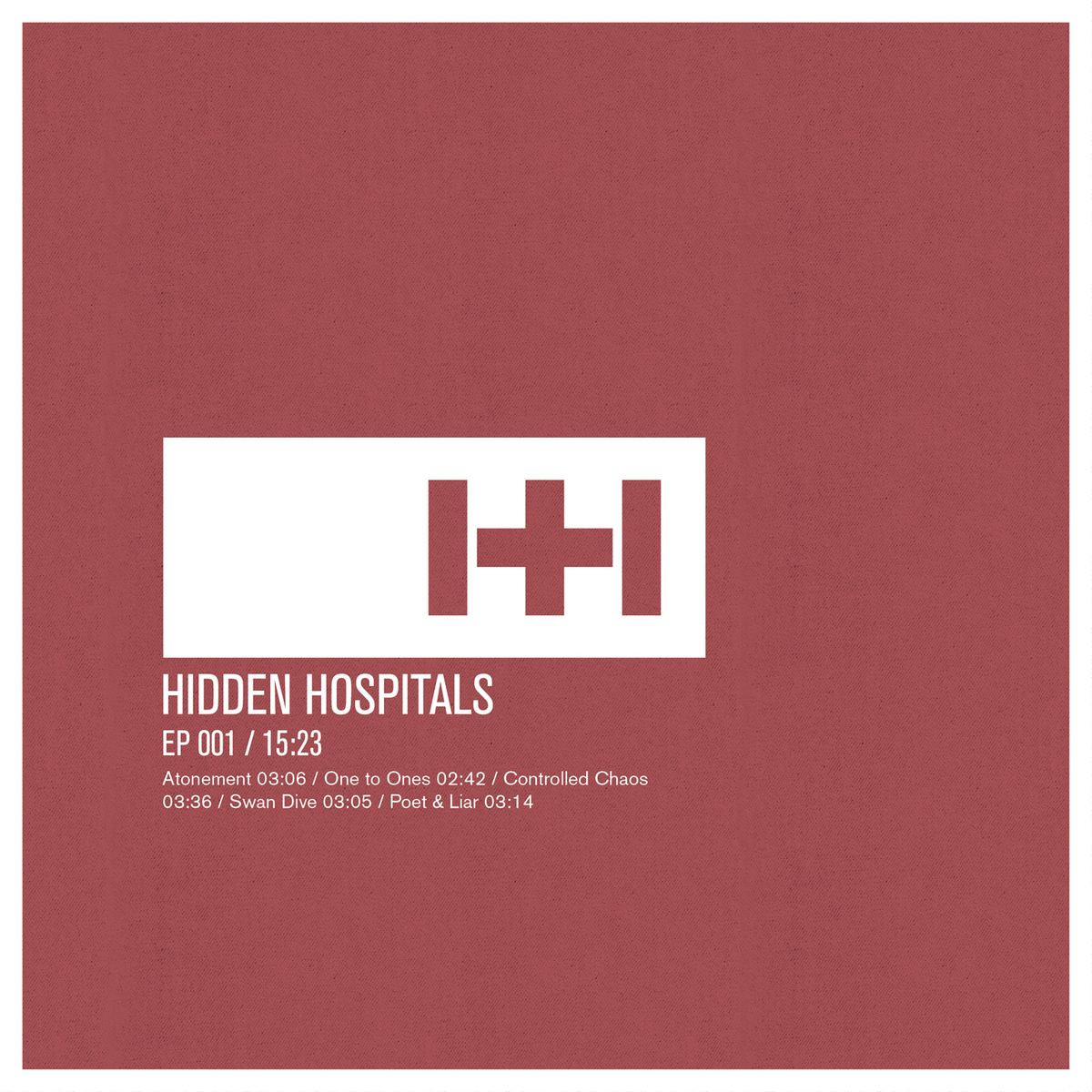
Hidden Hospitals album cover for EP 001

EP 001 was released on September 1, 2011. For the initial release, the band packaged together packs of five download cards that were individually stamped and signed with hand written codes. The packs were banded together with vellum and sealed with a |+| wax seal. These cards were sent to friends and family as well as press and industry. The album was recorded in Nashville, Tennessee, and produced by J. Hall.

This EP contained five songs: "Atonement", "One to Ones", "Controlled Chaos", "Swan Dive", and "Poet & Liar."

=== EP 002 (2012) ===
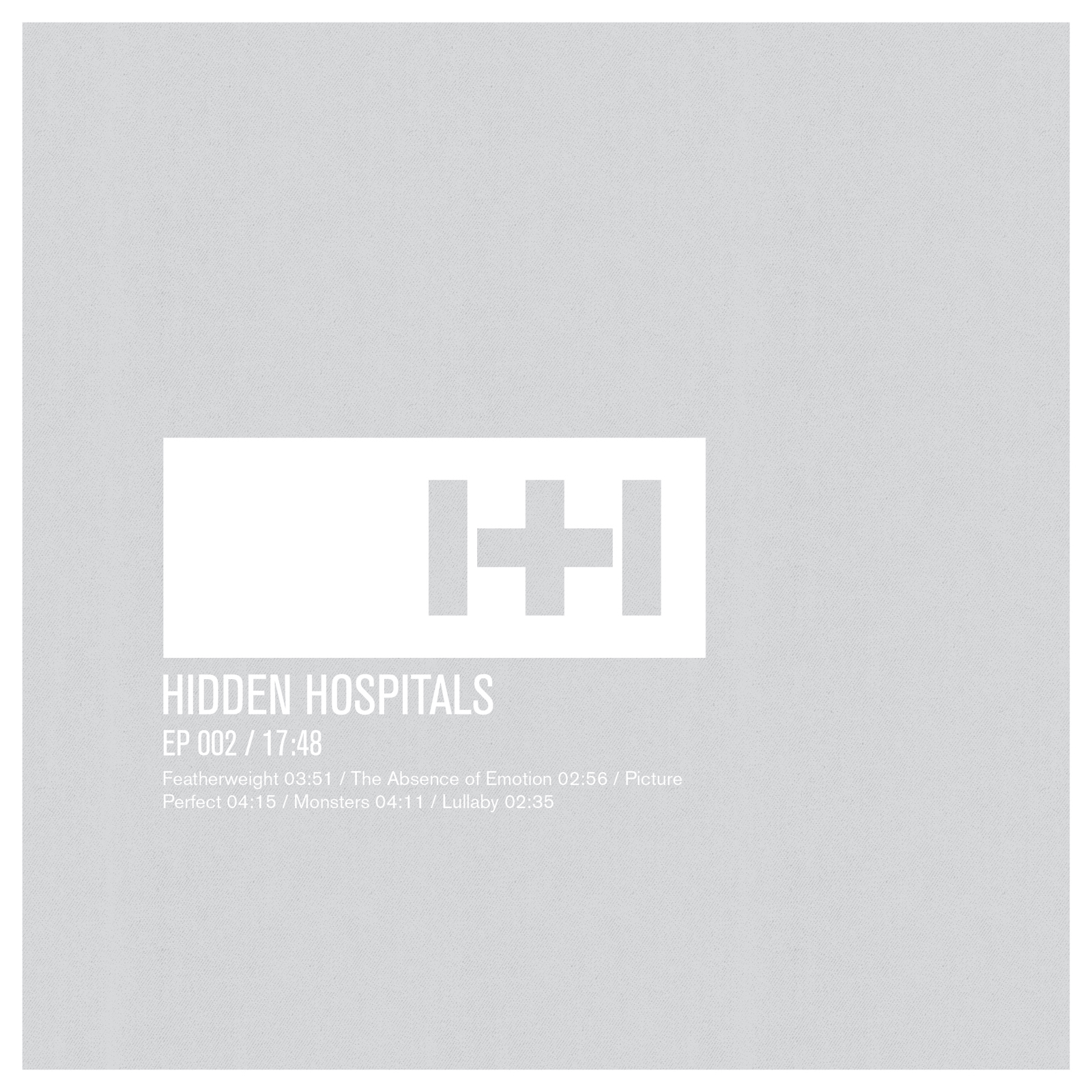
Hidden Hospitals album cover for EP 002

EP 002 released 30 October 2012. The album was produced and mixed by J. Hall.

This EP contained five songs: "Featherweight," "The Absence of Emotion," "Picture Perfect," "Monsters," and "Lullaby."

=== Surface Tension (2015) ===
1. Pulp
2. Rose Hips
3. Modern Saints
4. History
5. Wounded Sirens
6. Bone Scraper
7. Trilogy
8. Synesthesia
9. Animals
10. Broken Skeletons
11. From Toxin
12. Surface Tension

=== Liars (2018) ===
1. Razor Blades
2. Liars
3. Smile & Wave
4. Better Off
5. Acid Rain
6. Pulling Teeth
7. Typecast
8. Memories
9. Taking Sides
10. The Weeds
