= Dave Elkins =

American musician

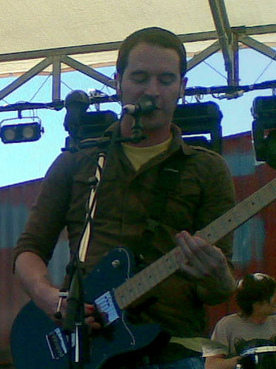
- Elkins performing with Mae in 2008

Background information
- Born: Dave Gimenez; Virginia Beach, Virginia
- Origin: United States
- Occupation: Musician
- Instruments: Singing, guitar
- Member of: Mae; Schematic
- Formerly of: Sky's the Limit

Dave Elkins (born Dave Gimenez) is an American musician from Virginia Beach, Virginia. He is best known as the co-founder and lead singer of the band Mae. His other notable musical projects include Sky's The Limit and Schematic.

== Career ==
=== Sky's the Limit ===
In 2001, Elkins was the lead singer for the band Sky's the Limit. The band's only album, self-titled, was originally released independently, then later released again through Spartan Records to allow for greater distribution. Elkins went on to re-record several Sky's the Limit songs with Mae.

=== Mae ===
In 2002, Elkins formed the band Mae with friend Jacob Marshall, with Elkins serving as lead vocalist and guitarist through several studio albums and EPs. The band went on hiatus in 2010, at which point Elkins and the other band members moved on to other projects. The band announced a reunion tour in 2014 and released a new album on Tooth and Nail Records in 2018.

=== Schematic ===
After Mae went on hiatus in 2010 Elkins formed a record label and a band under the name Schematic. He serves as the vocalist and producer for and composes and records most of the tracks himself. The band's albums are released through Spartan Records. The project was put on hold for Mae's reunion tour.

== Personal life ==
Elkins moved to Nashville, Tennessee in 2011. He is currently a producer and engineer at Schematic Studios in Goodlettsville, Tennessee.
