= List of Underoath members =

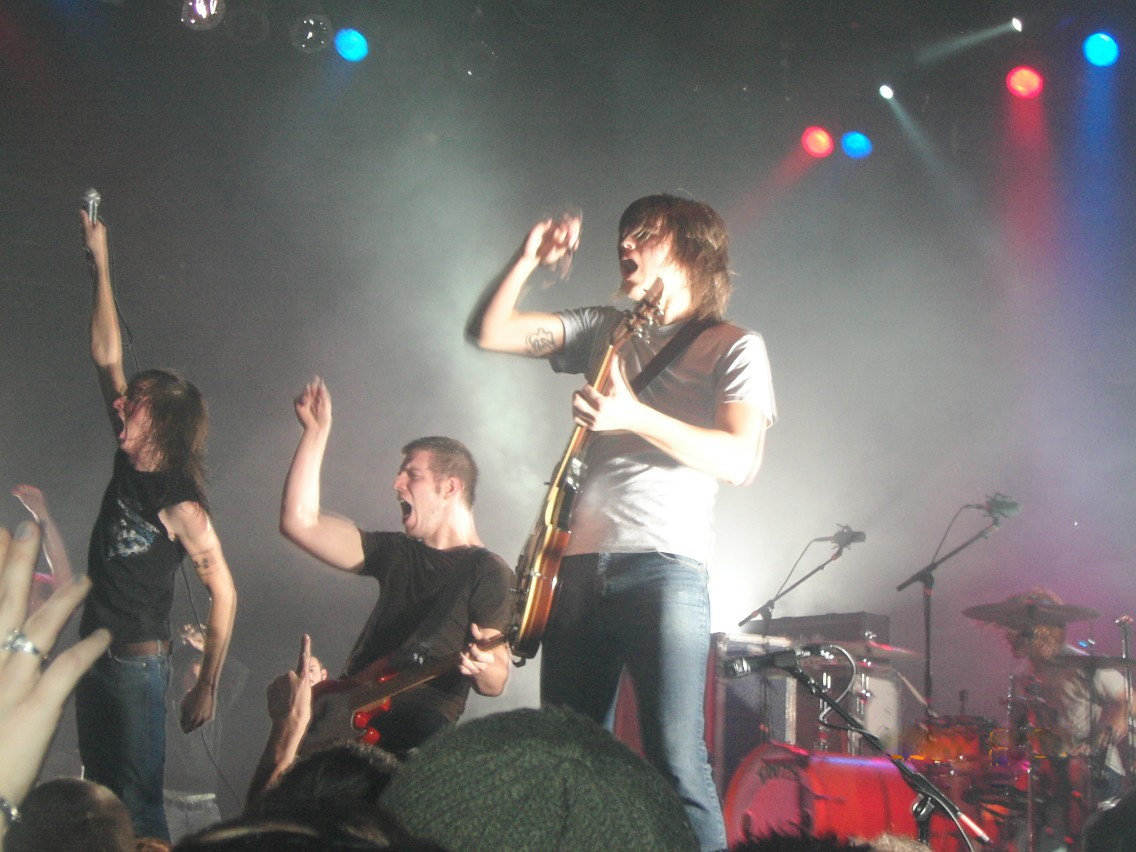
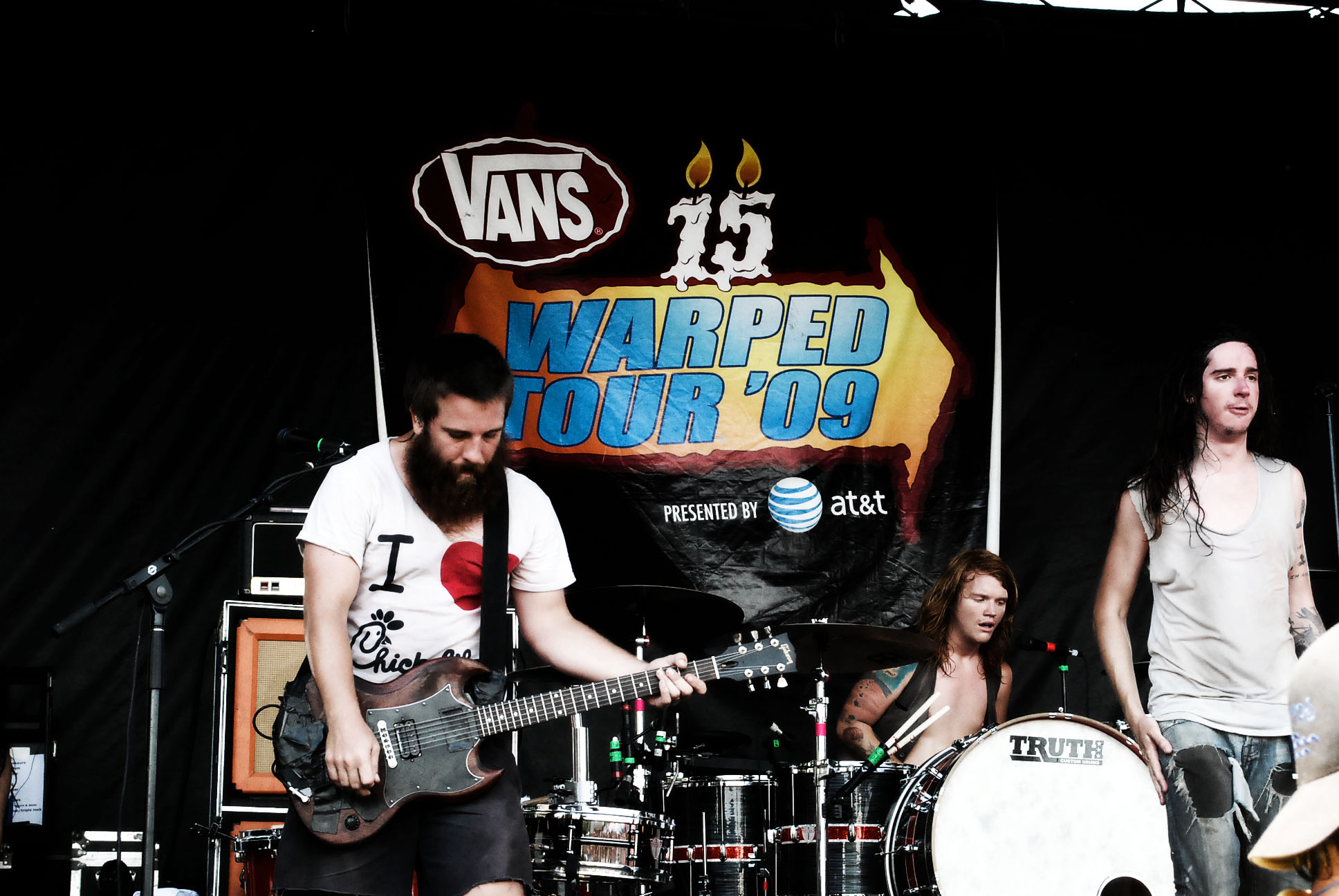
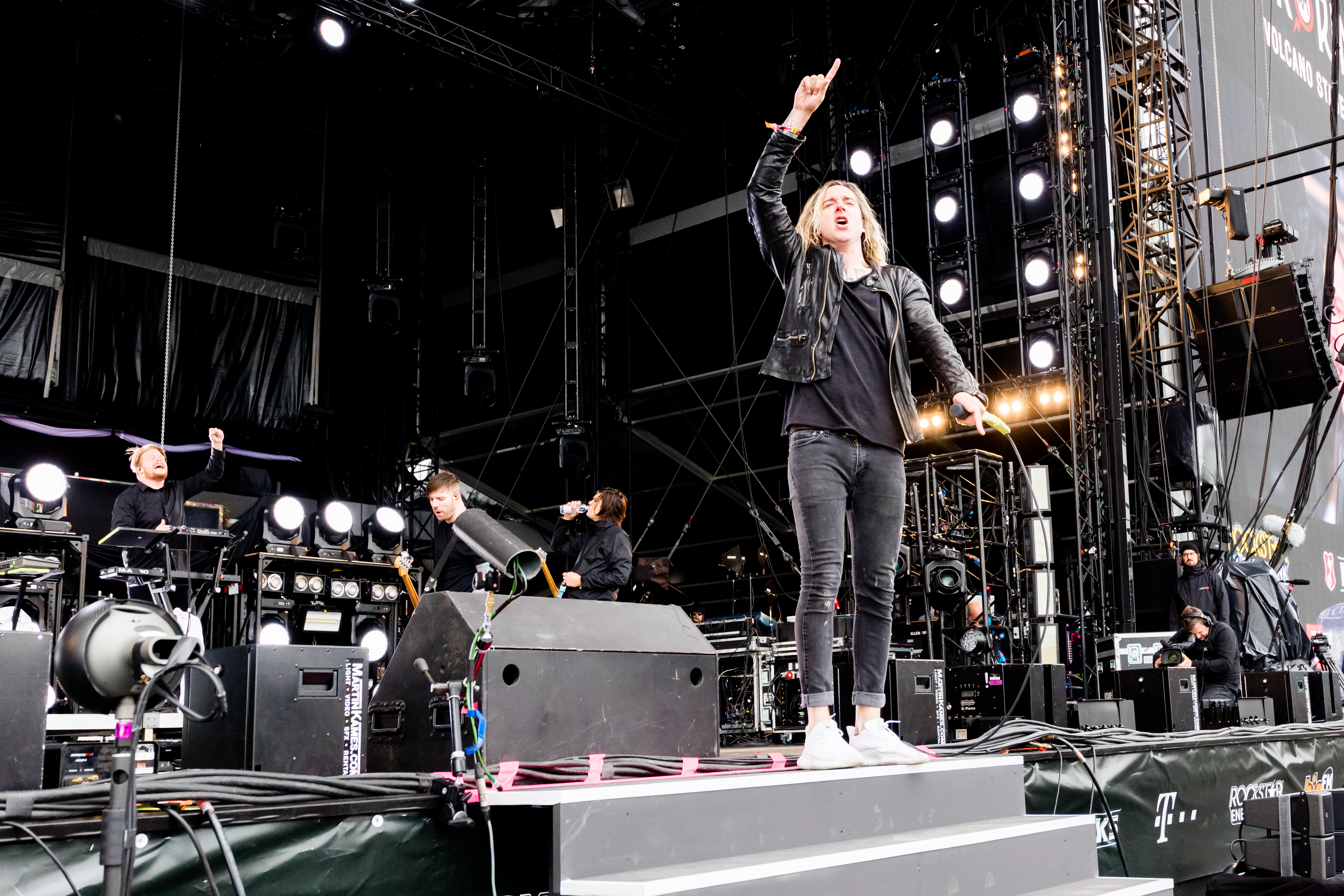
Members of Underoath performing in 2005, 2009 and 2019

Underoath is an American post-hardcore band from Tampa, Florida. Originally formed on November 30, 1997, by vocalist Dallas Taylor and guitarist Luke Morton, the first lineup of the group was completed with the addition of second guitarist Corey Steger, bassist Rey Anasco and drummer Aaron Gillespie. The band currently consists of Gillespie, alongside keyboardist Christopher Dudley (since 2000), guitarist Timothy McTague (since 2001), bassist Grant Brandell (since 2002), and vocalist Spencer Chamberlain (since 2003).

== History ==
Ray Anasco was soon replaced by Octavio Fernandez. Following the departure of Morton in early 1999, Underoath signed to Takehold Records and released its debut album Act of Depression. The band followed up its debut a year later with Cries of the Past, which featured new members Matthew Clark on bass (Fernandez moved to rhythm guitar) and Christopher Dudley on keyboards. Clark was replaced by Billy Nottke in 2001 and later Grant Brandell in January 2002, while Timothy McTague took over from the departing Steger.

In July 2003, it was announced that Taylor had left Underoath. He was temporarily replaced on tour by Matt Tarpey, before Spencer Chamberlain joined later in the year. Also in 2003, Fernandez was briefly replaced by Kelly Scott Nunn, before James Smith joined the band later in the year.

The lineup of Underoath remained stable until April 2010, when it was announced that Gillespie – the last remaining original member of the band – would be leaving. He was replaced by former Norma Jean drummer Daniel Davison the following month. After one more studio album, 2010's Ø (Disambiguation), Underoath announced a farewell tour, which ended on January 26, 2013.

The band returned two years later with original drummer Gillespie returning to the lineup. An eighth studio album, Erase Me, was released in 2018. On March 28, 2023, long-term rhythm guitarist James Smith announced that he had been "informed" he was no longer a member of Underoath.

On December 14, 2024, at a concert in St. Petersburg, FL, Taylor appeared on stage with Underoath and performed the song "When The Sun Sleeps" alongside all current members.

== Members ==
=== Current ===
Image	Name	Years active	Instruments	Release contributions
	Aaron Gillespie	1997–2010; 2015–present	drums; clean vocals; piano	all Underoath releases except Ø (Disambiguation) (2010)
	Christopher Dudley	2000–2013; 2015–present	keyboards; samples; programming; percussion	all Underoath releases from Cries of the Past (2000) onwards
	Timothy McTague	2001–2013; 2015–present	lead guitar; rhythm guitar; backing vocals; percussion	all Underoath releases from The Changing of Times (2002) onwards
	Grant Brandell	2002–2013; 2015–present	bass	all Underoath releases from They're Only Chasing Safety (2004) onwards
	Spencer Chamberlain	2003–2013; 2015–present	lead vocals; additional guitar	all Underoath releases from They're Only Chasing Safety (2004) onwards

=== Former ===
Image	Name	Years active	Instruments	Release contributions
	Dallas Taylor	1997–2003 (guest 2024)	lead vocals	Act of Depression (1999); Cries of the Past (2000); The Changing of Times (2002)
	Corey Steger	1997–2001 (died 2021)	lead guitar (1999–2001); rhythm guitar (1997–2000); backing vocals	Act of Depression (1999); Cries of the Past (2000)
	Luke Morton	1997–1999	lead guitar	none
	Rey Anasco	1997–1998	bass	none
	Octavio Fernandez	1998–2003	bass (1998–2000); rhythm guitar (2000–2003)	Act of Depression (1999); Cries of the Past (2000); The Changing of Times (2002)
	Matthew Clark	2000–2001	bass	Cries of the Past (2000)
	Billy Nottke	2001–2002	bass	The Changing of Times (2002)
	Kelly Scott Nunn	2003	rhythm guitar	none
	James Smith	2003–2013; 2015–2023	rhythm guitar; percussion; backing vocals	all Underoath releases from They're Only Chasing Safety (2004) to Voyeurist (2022)
	Daniel Davison	2010–2013	drums; percussion	Ø (Disambiguation) (2010)

=== Touring ===
Image	Name	Years active	Instruments	Details
	Alena Cason	2000	backing vocals	Cason briefly toured with Underoath during an early tour in support of Cries of the Past in 2000.
	Matt Tarpey	2003	lead vocals	Tarpey filled in on vocals for a tour after original singer Dallas Taylor left the band in July 2003.
	Kenny Bozich	2007	drums	Bozich filled in for Gillespie during a world tour in 2007, after the regular drummer injured his hand.
	Tanner Wayne	2009	drums	Wayne filled in for Gillespie during the 2009 Warped tour.
	Tyler Smith	2011	lead vocals	Smith substituted for Spencer Chamberlain at a show in 2011, after the frontman fell ill.

== Lineups ==
Period	Members	Releases
Late 1997 – mid 1998	Dallas Taylor – lead vocals; Luke Morton – lead guitar; Corey Steger – rhythm guitar, backing vocals; Rey Anasco – bass; Aaron Gillespie – drums, backing vocals	none
mid 1998 – early 1999	Dallas Taylor – lead vocals; Luke Morton – lead guitar; Corey Steger – rhythm guitar, backing vocals; Octavio Fernandez – bass; Aaron Gillespie – drums, backing vocals	none
early 1999 – early 2000	Dallas Taylor – lead vocals; Corey Steger – lead and rhythm guitar, backing vocals; Octavio Fernandez – bass; Aaron Gillespie – drums, backing vocals	Act of Depression (1999)
early 2000 – mid 2001	Dallas Taylor – lead vocals; Corey Steger – lead guitar, backing vocals; Octavio Fernandez – rhythm guitar; Matthew Clarke – bass; Aaron Gillespie – drums, backing vocals; Christopher Dudley – keyboards, percussion	Cries of the Past (2000)
mid 2001 – January 2002	Dallas Taylor – lead vocals; Timothy McTague – lead guitar, backing vocals; Octavio Fernandez – rhythm guitar; Billy Nottke – bass; Aaron Gillespie – drums, vocals; Christopher Dudley – keyboards, percussion	The Changing of Times (2002)
January 2002 – early 2003	Dallas Taylor – lead vocals; Timothy McTague – lead guitar, backing vocals; Octavio Fernandez – rhythm guitar; Grant Brandell – bass; Aaron Gillespie – drums, vocals; Christopher Dudley – keyboards, percussion	none
early – July 2003	Dallas Taylor – lead vocals; Timothy McTague – lead guitar, backing vocals; Kelly Scott Nunn – rhythm guitar; Grant Brandell – bass; Aaron Gillespie – drums, vocals; Christopher Dudley – keyboards, percussion	none
July – November 2003	Timothy McTague – lead guitar, backing vocals; Kelly Scott Nunn – rhythm guitar; Grant Brandell – bass; Aaron Gillespie – drums, vocals; Christopher Dudley – keyboards, percussion; Matt Tarpey – lead vocals (substitute)	none
November 2003 – April 2010	Spencer Chamberlain – lead vocals, occ. guitar; Timothy McTague – lead guitar, backing vocals; James Smith – rhythm guitar, percussion; Grant Brandell – bass; Aaron Gillespie – drums, vocals; Christopher Dudley – keyboards, percussion	They're Only Chasing Safety (2004); Define the Great Line (2006); 777 (2007); Survive, Kaleidoscope (2008); Lost in the Sound of Separation (2008); Live at Koko (2010)
May 2010 – January 2013	Spencer Chamberlain – lead vocals, occ. guitar; Timothy McTague – lead guitar, backing vocals; James Smith – rhythm guitar, percussion; Grant Brandell – bass; Daniel Davison – drums, percussion; Christopher Dudley – keyboards, percussion	Ø (Disambiguation) (2010); "Farewell" (2013)
Disbanded
August 2015 – March 2023	Spencer Chamberlain – lead vocals, occ. guitar; Timothy McTague – lead guitar, backing vocals; James Smith – rhythm guitar, percussion, backing vocals; Grant Brandell – bass; Aaron Gillespie – drums, vocals, piano; Christopher Dudley – keyboards, percussion	Erase Me (2018); Lost in the Sound of Separation Live (2020); Define the Great Line Live (2020); They're Only Chasing Safety Live (2020); Voyeurist (2022)
March 2023 – present	Spencer Chamberlain – lead vocals, occ. guitar; Timothy McTague – lead and rhythm guitar, backing vocals; Grant Brandell – bass; Aaron Gillespie – drums, vocals, piano; Christopher Dudley – keyboards, percussion	The Place After This One (2025)
