= Underoath discography =

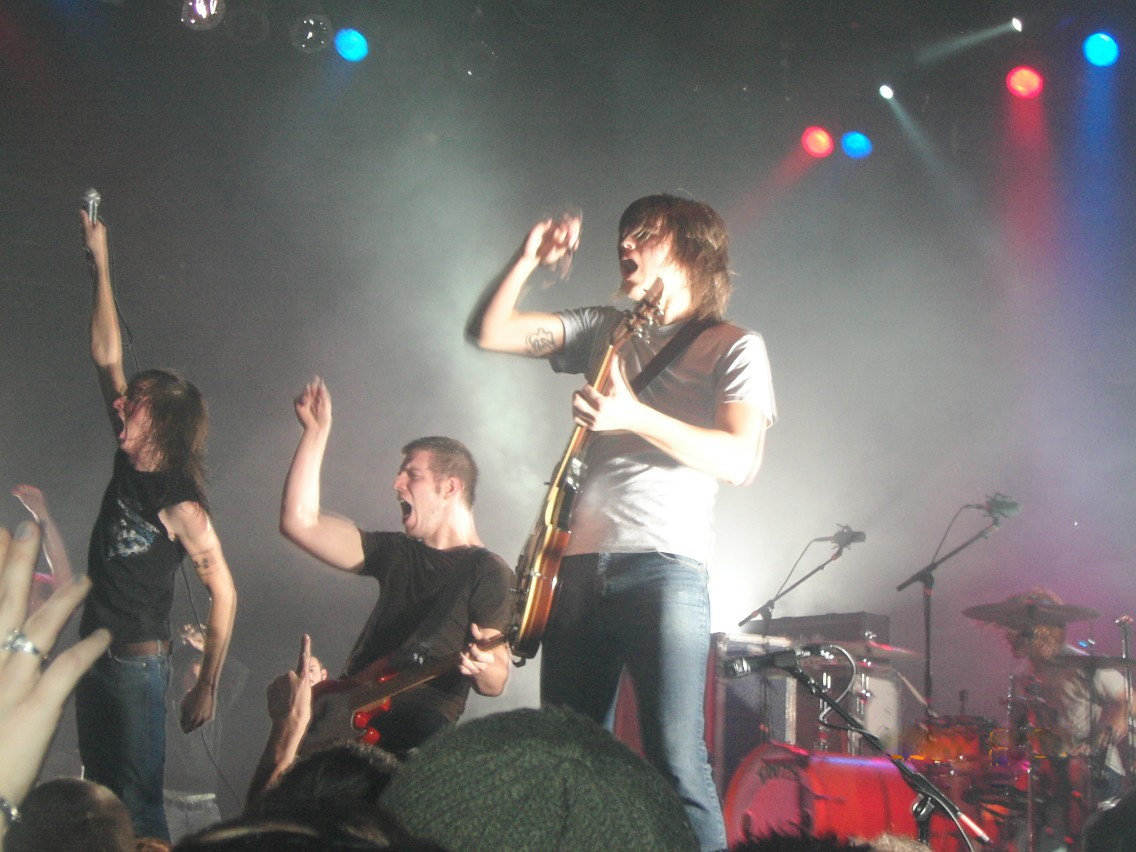
- Underoath in 2005
- Studio albums: 10
- Live albums: 3
- Compilation albums: 3
- Singles: 26
- Video albums: 1
- Music videos: 26

The following is a comprehensive discography of Underoath, an American post-hardcore band. They have released 10 studio albums, 4 compilation albums, 6 live albums, 1 video album, 26 singles and 26 music videos. They were founded in 1999 and disbanded in early 2013 following their anthology compilation. Two of their albums have received U.S. Gold certifications and Define the Great Line debuted a No. 2 on the Billboard 200.

== Albums ==
=== Studio albums ===
Title	Album details	Peak chart positions								Certifications (sales thresholds)
Title	Album details	US	US Rock	US Christ	US Heat	CAN	AUS	NZ	UK	Certifications (sales thresholds)
Act of Depression	Released: July 4, 1999; Label: Takehold	—	—	—	—	—	—	—	—	
Cries of the Past	Released: July 4, 2000; Label: Takehold	—	—	—	—	—	—	—	—	
The Changing of Times	Released: February 26, 2002; Label: Solid State	—	—	—	—	—	—	—	—	
They're Only Chasing Safety	Released: June 15, 2004; Label: Solid State	101	—	7	1	—	—	—	—	RIAA: Gold
Define the Great Line	Released: June 20, 2006; Label: Tooth & Nail	2	1	1	—	14	28	37	—	RIAA: Gold
Lost in the Sound of Separation	Released: September 2, 2008; Label: Solid State, Tooth & Nail	8	3	1	—	15	36	—	169	
Ø (Disambiguation)	Released: November 9, 2010; Label: Solid State, Tooth & Nail	23	4	1	—	41	74	—	—	
Erase Me	Released: April 6, 2018; Label: Fearless	16	4	—	—	67	52	—	—	
Voyeurist	Released: January 14, 2022; Label: Fearless	126	19	4	—	—	—	—	—	
The Place After This One	Released: March 28, 2025; Label: MNRK Heavy	—	—	—	—	—	—	—	—	
"—" denotes releases that did not chart

=== Live albums ===
Title	Album details	Peak chart positions		
Title	Album details	US	US Rock	US Christ
Survive, Kaleidoscope	Released: May 27, 2008; Label: Tooth & Nail	81	19	2
Live at Koko	Released: March 11, 2010; Label: Tooth & Nail	—	—	—
Lost in the Sound of Separation Live Recording	Released: November 6, 2020; Label: Independent	—	—	—
Define the Great Line Live Recording	Released: December 4, 2020; Label: Independent	—	—	—
They're Only Chasing Safety Live Recording	Released: February 5, 2021; Label: Independent	—	—	—
UNDEROATH VOYEURIST | Digital Ghost	Released: August 18, 2023; Label: Fearless	—	—	—

=== Compilation albums ===
Title	Album details	Peak chart positions
Title	Album details	US Christ
Play Your Old Stuff (Note: Play Your Old Stuff is a three-CD boxset that features Underoath's studio albums: The Changing of Times (2002), They're Only Chasing Safety (2004) and Define the Great Line (2006).)	Released: October 18, 2011; Label: Tooth & Nail, Solid State	—
Anthology: 1999–2013	Released: November 6, 2012; Label: Tooth & Nail, Solid State, Roadrunner	31
Icon Underoath	Released: January 7, 2014; Label: Tooth & Nail, Solid State	—
The Ultimate Playlist	Released: May 6, 2016; Label: Capitol	—

=== Video albums ===
Title	Album details	Notes
777	Release date: July 17, 2007; Label: Tooth & Nail	US No. 2

== Songs ==
=== Singles ===
List of singles, with selected chart positions, showing year released and album name
Title	Year	Peak chart positions	Album
Title	Year	US Main.	Album
"Reinventing Your Exit"	2004	—	They're Only Chasing Safety
"It's Dangerous Business Walking Out Your Front Door"	2004	—	They're Only Chasing Safety
"Writing on the Walls"	2006	— (Note: "Writing on the Walls" did not enter the Mainstream Rock chart, but peaked at number 40 on the Active Rock chart.)	Define the Great Line
"In Regards to Myself"	2006	—	Define the Great Line
"You're Ever So Inviting"	2007	—	Define the Great Line
"A Moment Suspended in Time"	2007	—	Define the Great Line
"Desperate Times Desperate Measures"	2008	—	Lost in the Sound of Separation
"Too Bright to See Too Loud to Hear"	2009	—	Lost in the Sound of Separation
"In Division"	2010	—	Ø (Disambiguation)
"Paper Lung"	2011	—	Ø (Disambiguation)
"Sunburnt"	2013	—	Anthology: 1999–2013
"Unsound"	2013	—	Anthology: 1999–2013
"On My Teeth"	2018	—	Erase Me
"Rapture"	2018	19	Erase Me
"ihateit"	2018	17	Erase Me
"Damn Excuses"	2021	—	Voyeurist
"Hallelujah"	2021	37	Voyeurist
"Pneumonia"	2021	—	Voyeurist
"Cycle" (featuring Ghostemane)	2021	—	Voyeurist
"Numb"	2021	—	Voyeurist
"Let Go"	2023	—	Non-album singles
"Lifeline (Drowning)"	2023	—	Non-album singles
"Teeth"	2024	—	The Place After This One
"Survivor's Guilt"	2024	—	The Place After This One
"Generation No Surrender"	2024	—	The Place After This One
"All The Love Is Gone"	2025	30	The Place After This One

=== As featured artist ===
List of singles as featured artist, showing year released and album name
Title	Year	Album
"Wasted Space" (with Kayzo)	2018	Unleashed
"Falling" (with Rezz)	2019	Beyond the Senses
"VEN0M" (with Nothing,Nowhere)	2023	Void Eternal
"In the Night" (with Des Rocs)	2024	Dream Machine
"A Bullet w/ My Name On" (with Bring Me the Horizon)	2024	Post Human: Nex Gen
"Demon or Ghost" (with Mitchell Tenpenny)	2024	The 3rd
"Nostalgia Kills" (with Static Dress)	2026	Injury Episode

=== Compilation additions ===
Year	Song	Released on	Notes
2005	"Wrapped Around Your Finger"	¡Policia!: A Tribute to the Police	The Police cover
2007	"Dangerous Business Since 1979"	Incorporated	Mashup with MewithoutYou

== Music videos ==
Year	Song	Director(s)
2002	"When the Sun Sleeps"	Darren Doane, Phillip Reardon
2004	"Reinventing Your Exit"	Acquastrada
2004	"It's Dangerous Business Walking Out Your Front Door"	Josh Graham
2006	"Writing on the Walls"	Popcore Films
2006	"In Regards to Myself"	Popcore Films
2007	"You're Ever So Inviting"	Popcore Films
2007	"A Moment Suspended in Time"	Popcore Films
2008	"Desperate Times, Desperate Measures"	Walter Robot
2008	"Breathing in a New Mentality"	Perrone Salvatore
2009	"Too Bright to See Too Loud to Hear"	Popcore Films
2010	"In Division"	James Edwin Myers
2011	"Paper Lung"	Jonathan Desbiens
2011	"Driftwood"	Unknown
2011	"Catch Myself Catching Myself"	Unknown
2013	"Sunburnt"	Daniel Davison, Oscar Zabala
2018	"On My Teeth"	Andrew Joffe
2018	"Rapture"	Andrew Joffe
2018	"ihateit"	Caleb Mallery
2019	"Bloodlust"	Caleb Mallery
2019	"Wake Me"	Wyatt Clough
2023	"Let Go"	Joel J. Cook
2024	"Teeth"	Unknown
2024	"Survivor's Guilt"	Jacob Moniz
2024	"Generation No Surrender"	Nate Utesch Jacob Moniz, Underoath
2025	"All The Love Is Gone"	Caleb Mallery
2025	"Loss"	Unknown
