= Voyeurist =

Studio album by Underoath
- Released: January 14, 2022
- Genre: Metalcore; post-hardcore
- Length: 38:39
- Label: Fearless
- Producer: Tim McTague; JJ Revell; Aaron Gillespie; Chris Dudley; Spencer Chamberlain

Underoath chronology
Erase Me (2018)	Voyeurist (2022)	The Place After This One (2025)

Singles from Voyeurist
- 1. "Damn Excuses" Released: July 14, 2021; 2. "Hallelujah" Released: August 4, 2021; 3. "Pneumonia" Released: September 22, 2021; 4. "Cycle" Released: October 27, 2021; 5. "Numb" Released: December 8, 2021

Voyeurist is the ninth studio album by American rock band Underoath, released on January 14, 2022, via Fearless Records, after a three-month pushback due to vinyl production delays. It is their first album in four years following Erase Me (2018), marking the longest gap between two studio albums in the band's career without breaking up and it is the final album with rhythm guitarist James Smith who was fired from the band in March 2023.

== Background ==
On July 14, 2021, the band released "Damn Excuses", the lead single from the album. On August 4, 2021, the band released the second single from the album, "Hallelujah".

On September 22, 2021, the band released the third single "Pneumonia" and revealed it was written exactly one year prior to release. The single is the album's seven-minute finale and was partly inspired by the passing of guitarist Tim McTague's father. This was followed by two more singles, "Cycle" featuring Ghostemane, released on October 27, 2021, and "Numb", released on December 8, 2021, the latter described as "a grown-up version of something off their 2004 album They're Only Chasing Safety."

The band described the album as "high-def violence," with a "technologically advanced, but undeniably visceral" sound. Guitarist Tim McTague stated, "I've always wanted to record our own album. I think we just needed to get into a headspace personally that would allow criticism and critique to land in a productive and constructive way. We grew so much in real time and I think the record speaks to that growth and collaboration. I haven't ever felt this attached to a project in my life."

== Promotion ==
The album was performed live entirely in a livestream concert entitled Voyeurist: Digital Ghost, on December 3, 2021. One attendee would be chosen to receive an Underoath prize pack that includes a vinyl edition of Voyeurist, along with three of their previous albums, They're Only Chasing Safety (2004), Define the Great Line (2006) and Lost in the Sound of Separation (2008) in vinyl as part of the Underoath: Observatory boxset, named after a livestream series of those three albums performed entirely in 2020.

Underoath embarked on a North American tour in support of the album with Spiritbox from February to March. Vocalist Spencer Chamberlain stated about the tour: "There was a time during the pandemic where I didn't know if we’d ever get to tour again. I would sit up at night and try to wrap my brain around a world without live music and I just couldn't ever digest that thought." Every Time I Die was originally to join Underoath and Spiritbox for the Voyeurist tour, but the group split up in January 2022. The group was replaced by Bad Omens and Stray from the Path.

== Reception ==
Professional ratings
Review scores
Source	Rating
AllMusic	4.5/5 stars
Distorted Sound	8/10
Kerrang!	4/5
Punk News	3/5 stars
Wall of Sound	9/10

Kerrang praised the album, stating that "Voyeurist is arguably the most cohesive and coherent record of Underøath's career to date. It's an album that asks profound questions about the meaning of life and death, about the nature and purpose of existence (and non/un-existence) and about the role that faith and religion play in our lives – all to some of the most punishingly heavy music you’ll hear this year." Wall of Sound gave it a 9/10 rating.

== Track listing ==
All lyrics are written by Spencer Chamberlain and Aaron Gillespie, with additional writers noted; all music is composed by Chamberlain, Gillespie, Chris Dudley, and Tim McTague, with additional writers noted.

No.	Title	Lyrics	Music	Length
1.	"Damn Excuses"			2:37
2.	"Hallelujah"			3:01
3.	"I'm Pretty Sure I'm Out of Luck and Have No Friends"			3:45
4.	"Cycle" (featuring Ghostemane)	Eric Whitney		4:13
5.	"Thorn"			4:36
6.	"(No Oasis)"			2:49
7.	"Take a Breath"			3:26
8.	"We're All Gonna Die"			3:19
9.	"Numb"		JJ Revell	3:41
10.	"Pneumonia"	McTague	Revell; Seth Davis	7:12
Total length:				38:39

== Personnel ==
Underoath

- Spencer Chamberlain – lead vocals
- Aaron Gillespie – drums, clean vocals
- Tim McTague – guitars, bass
- Chris Dudley – electronics, programming

Additional contributors

- Underoath – production
- Tim McTague – engineering
- JJ Revell – production, engineering, additional synthesizer on "We're All Gonna Die", additional percussion on "Cycle"
- Chad Howat – mixing
- Ted Jensen – mastering
- Chris Dudley – sound design
- Scooter – guitar and bass technician
- Rowdy – drum technician
- Tension Division – creative direction, art, design
- Allison Gruchacz – choir on "Hallelujah"
- Rachel Gabrielse – choir on "Hallelujah"
- Katie Doerner – choir on "Hallelujah"
- Tommy Phillips – choir on "Hallelujah"
- Nate Murray – choir on "Hallelujah"
- Michael Mobley – choir on "Hallelujah"
- Nate Young – choir on "Hallelujah"
- Adam Enfinger – choir on "Hallelujah"
- Daniel Nelson – choir on "Hallelujah"

== Charts ==
Chart performance for Voyeurist
Chart (2022)	Peak position
US Billboard 200	126
US Christian Albums (Billboard)	4
US Top Rock Albums (Billboard)	19
