= Anthology: 1999–2013 =

Compilation album by Underoath
- Released: November 6, 2012
- Recorded: March 1999–late 2012
- Genre: Christian metal, metalcore, emo, screamo
- Length: 77:08
- Label: Solid State
- Producer: Matt Goldman, Adam Dutkiewicz, James Paul Wisner

Underoath chronology
Ø (Disambiguation) (2010)	Anthology: 1999–2013 (2012)	Erase Me (2018)

Singles from Anthology: 1999-2013
- 1. "Sunburnt"/"Unsound" Released: January 21, 2013

Professional ratings
Review scores
Source	Rating
Absolute Punk	95%
Allmusic	3.5/5 stars
Jesus Freak Hideout	4.5/5 stars

Anthology: 1999–2013 is the second compilation album by American rock band Underoath. It was released on November 6, 2012, via Solid State Records. The announcement of the album coincided with the band's announcement of its intention to embark on a farewell tour in 2013, and disband. Anthology: 1999–2013 features 17 songs from all seven of Underoath's studio albums, presented in reverse chronological order, including two new songs, "Sunburnt" and "Unsound". The two new songs were produced by Matt Goldman, a longtime collaborator of the band.

== Track listing ==
No.	Title	Original release (year)	Length
1.	"Sunburnt"	Anthology: 1999–2013 (2012)	4:53
2.	"Unsound"	Anthology: 1999–2013 (2012)	3:35
3.	"In Division"	Ø (Disambiguation) (2010)	3:58
4.	"Catch Myself Catching Myself"	Ø (Disambiguation) (2010)	3:29
5.	"Paper Lung"	Ø (Disambiguation) (2010)	4:11
6.	"Desperate Times, Desperate Measures"	Lost in the Sound of Separation (2008)	3:28
7.	"Too Bright to See, Too Loud to Hear"	Lost in the Sound of Separation (2008)	4:31
8.	"In Regards to Myself"	Define the Great Line (2006)	3:24
9.	"You're Ever So Inviting"	Define the Great Line (2006)	4:13
10.	"Writing on the Walls"	Define the Great Line (2006)	4:02
11.	"A Boy Brushed Red Living in Black and White"	They're Only Chasing Safety (2004)	4:28
12.	"Reinventing Your Exit"	They're Only Chasing Safety (2004)	4:22
13.	"It's Dangerous Business Walking Out Your Front Door"	They're Only Chasing Safety (2004)	3:58
14.	"I've Got Ten Friends and a Crowbar That Says You Ain't Gonna Do Jack"	They're Only Chasing Safety [reissue] (2005)	5:06
15.	"When the Sun Sleeps"	The Changing of Times (2002)	5:33
16.	"Cries of the Past"	Cries of the Past (2000)	8:23
17.	"Heart of Stone"	Act of Depression (1999)	5:50
Total length:			77:08

== Personnel ==
Underoath

- Spencer Chamberlain – lead vocals (tracks 1–14)
- Dallas Taylor – lead vocals (tracks 15–17)
- Tim McTague – lead guitar, backing vocals (tracks 1–15)
- Corey Steger – lead guitar, backing vocals (tracks 16–17), rhythm guitar (track 17)
- James Smith – rhythm guitar (tracks 1–14)
- Octavio Fernandez – rhythm guitar (tracks 15–16), bass (track 17)
- Grant Brandell – bass (tracks 1–14)
- William Nottke – bass (track 15)
- Matt Clark – bass (track 16)
- Daniel Davison – drums, percussion (tracks 1–5)
- Aaron Gillespie – drums, percussion (tracks 6–17), clean vocals (tracks 6–15)
- Chris Dudley – keyboards, synthesizers (tracks 1–16)

Production and recording

- Matt Goldman – producer
- Track 14 on the special edition produced, mixed, and engineered by Matt Goldman at Glow in the Dark Studios.

Additional musicians

- Daniel Davison – additional drums (track 6)
- Jeremy Griffith – additional vocals (track 7)
- John Duke – additional vocals (track 7)
