= Erase Me =

Erase Me may refer to:

- "Erase Me" (song), by Kid Cudi (2010)
- Erase Me (album), by Underoath (2018)
- "Erase Me", a song by Lizzy McAlpine from the album Five Seconds Flat (2022)
- "Erase Me", a song by Mammoth from the album Mammoth II (2023)
