= Broken Compass =

Studio album by Sleepwave
- Released: September 16, 2014
- Recorded: 2014 @ The House Of Loud, Elmwood Park, NJ
- Genre: Industrial metal; alternative rock; post-hardcore; post-grunge; experimental rock
- Length: 38:08
- Label: Epitaph
- Producer: David Bendeth

Broken Compass is the only studio album by Sleepwave, released through Epitaph Records. This is also the first full release for lead singer Spencer Chamberlain since the breakup of his previous band Underoath, before they reunited.

== Background ==
Chamberlain announced the formation of his new band in September 2013. The first track from the album was released on October of that year, "Rock And Roll Is Dead And So Am I". The album was produced by David Bendeth, whose credits include that of Bring Me the Horizon and Of Mice & Men. In an interview with Under the Gun Chamberlain said, "...I feel like when the record comes out things will change. Everyone that has supported us so far has been 100% in, they love what we’re up to. It’s something new, something fresh. It’s not me trying to relive my past or regurgitate something I’ve already done a million times."

== Reception ==
Professional ratings
Review scores
Source	Rating
HittheFloor	3.5/5 stars
Under the Gun Review	9/10
Alternative Press	4/5 stars

The album has been met with generally positive reviews. Jason Pettigrew of Alternative Press wrote, "There’s a certain kind of chrome-plated nostalgia at play on Broken Compass, one that hearkens back to the glory days of Alternative Nation, where bands like Smashing Pumpkins, Foo Fighters, Nine Inch Nails and Filter held court and garnered mass acclaim, but not at the expense of extracting their personalities from their art." HittheFloor's Antoine Omisore had a more mixed review, "...‘Broken Compass,’ gets a little dreary whether it's through the shackled efforts of a Deftones esque ambience on ‘Hold Up My Head’ or the murky ‘Disgusted : Disguised’. It's almost as if they've taken track ‘Repeat Routine’ literally, with a large portion of songs sounding like an identikit of each other."

The album was included at number 43 on Rock Sound's "Top 50 Albums of the Year" list.

== Track listing ==
No.	Title	Length
1.	"Paper Planes"	3:07
2.	"Rock and Roll Is Dead and So Am I"	3:35
3.	"Inner Body Revolt"	3:26
4.	"The Wolf"	3:18
5.	"Hold Up My Head"	4:12
6.	"Whole Again"	3:19
7.	"Disgusted : Disguised"	3:30
8.	"Replace Me"	2:43
9.	"Repeat Routine"	3:12
10.	"Through the Looking Glass"	3:35
11.	"Broken Compass"	4:11
Total length:		38:08

== Personnel ==
Sleepwave

- Spencer Chamberlain – vocals, Lyrics, guitars, keyboards, programming
- Stephen Bowman – guitars, bass guitar, keyboards, programming

Additional musicians

- Chris Kamrada – Drums
- Greg Johnson – programming

Production

- Produced by David Bendeth, 2014 @ The House Of Loud, Elmwood Park, NJ
- Mixed by David Bendeth & Brian Robbins
- Mastered by Ted Jensen @ Sterling Sound, New York
- Digital editing & engineers: Mitch Milan, Brian Robbins & Steve Sarkassian
- Additional composer (tracks: 4, 5, 8–10): John Bendeth
- Artwork by Aaron Marsh & Sam Kaufman
- Design by Sam Kaufman
