= The Place After This One =

Studio album by Underoath
- Released: March 28, 2025
- Genre: Metalcore; post-hardcore; industrial rock
- Length: 36:37
- Label: MNRK Heavy
- Producer: Danen Reed Rector

Underoath chronology
Voyeurist (2022)	The Place After This One (2025)

Singles from The Place After This One
- 1. "Teeth" Released: September 17, 2024; 2. "Survivor's Guilt" Released: October 21, 2024; 3. "Generation No Surrender" Released: December 16, 2024; 4. "All the Love is Gone" Released: February 14, 2025

Professional ratings
Review scores
Source	Rating
Kerrang!	3/5
New Noise Magazine	5/5 stars
Wall of Sound	8/10

The Place After This One is the tenth studio album by American rock band Underoath, released on March 28, 2025, via MNRK Heavy. It is the first album without rhythm guitarist James Smith, who had been with the band since their 2004 album They're Only Chasing Safety until his departure in 2023.

== Background ==
The band released three new singles throughout 2024: "Teeth" in September, "Survivors Guilt" in October, and "Generation No Surrender" in December. All three singles were included on The Place After This One, which was announced on February 14, 2025. Another single, "All the Love is Gone", was released on the same day as the announcement.

Talking about some of the singles, vocalist Spencer Chamberlain has stated that "Teeth" "almost has a vibe reminiscent of classic hip-hop samples or something that Linkin Park might have done, which I find so cool. I never imagined we'd actually pull it off in an Underoath song, but it came together so naturally." "Teeth" was the last song recorded by the band for the album, and drummer/vocalist Aaron Gillespie mentioned that he wanted it released as the first single, "Because it's so odd. The day we wrote it, I said this should be the first song we release. It's my favourite on the album." Chamberlain explained that "Generation No Surrender" was "written from the perspective that, if 'they' told us the world was ending and the apocalypse was upon us, we wouldn't be surprised – nor would we run from it." Finally, "All the Love is Gone" is described as "one of the most out-there songs we've ever written. We really wanted to create a track that was drum'n'bass-driven, kind of in the vein of The Prodigy, The Chemical Brothers, Noisia, etc. We also pulled elements from Justice and The Streets."

Spencer Chamberlain stated that the album title, which came up before writing, "is open-ended in that way. You could be talking about life after death, but you could be talking about life after this bus ride. You never know what's next. What's after Underoath? Is there life after Underoath? Do we do this until we're too old to walk? Are we going to be onstage like The Rolling Stones, you know what I mean?"

== Promotion and reception ==
The album was streamed entirely in a visualizer video on YouTube on March 30, 2025, two days after its release.

Underoath will embark on a North American tour in support of the album with Papa Roach and Rise Against from March to April and September to October, 2025.

The album has received mixed and positive reviews from critics. Chorus.fm praised the album, stating that "Underoath continue running towards their long-term goal of world domination on The Place After This One, and leave the door wide open to the realm of possibilities of where they will go next."

== Track listing ==
All lyrics are written by Spencer Chamberlain and Aaron Gillespie; all music is composed by Underoath, Danen Reed Rector, and JJ Revell, except where noted.

No.	Title	Music	Length
1.	"Generation No Surrender"		2:47
2.	"Devil"		3:47
3.	"Loss"		3:01
4.	"Survivor's Guilt"		3:18
5.	"All the Love Is Gone"	Underoath; Rector	3:02
6.	"And Then There Was Nothing"		2:13
7.	"Teeth"	Underoath; Rector; Revell; Keith "Ten4" Sorrells	2:36
8.	"Shame"		2:55
9.	"Spinning in Place"		2:26
10.	"Vultures" (featuring Troy Sanders)		2:53
11.	"Cannibal"		3:21
12.	"Outsider"		4:18
Total length:			36:37

== Personnel ==
Underoath

- Spencer Chamberlain – lead vocals
- Tim McTague – guitars
- Grant Brandell – bass
- Chris Dudley – keyboards, synths, electronics, programming
- Aaron Gillespie – drums, clean vocals

Additional contributors

- Danen Reed Rector – production, recording
- Matt Huber – mixing
- Troy Sanders – additional vocals on "Vultures"
