= Sleepwave =

American rock band

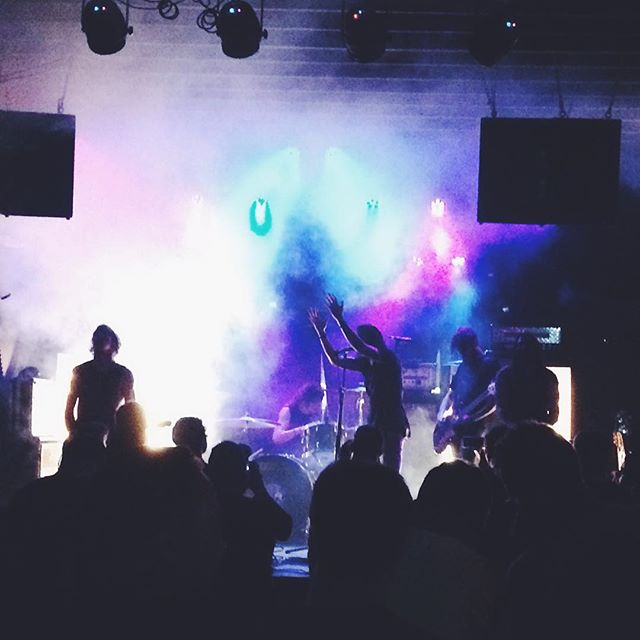
- Sleepwave performing in 2015

Background information
- Origin: St. Petersburg, Florida, U.S.
- Genres: Alternative rock; industrial metal; post-hardcore; post-grunge; experimental rock
- Years active: 2013–2016
- Label: Epitaph
- Members: Spencer Chamberlain; Stephen Bowman
- Website: sleepwave.merchline.com

Sleepwave was an American rock band based in St. Petersburg, Florida. It was founded in 2013 by vocalist Spencer Chamberlain after the dissolution of Underoath. Chamberlain signed with Epitaph Records. Shortly after, the duo announced their debut album, Broken Compass. Their song, "Through the Looking Glass", peaked at number 37 on the Billboard Mainstream Rock chart following its release in July 2014. Drug abuse and touring essentially ended their touring with Spencer returning to Underoath.

== History ==
Underoath announced their plans to disband during the fall of 2012. Chamberlain said of the disbanding, "It's sad to say that we feel like it's time to close this chapter, but we have never seen things more clearly. These have been the best years of my entire life, and I owe that to every single person who ever supported this band along the way. This wasn't a quick decision by any means. It's just time for us to move on." Underoath played their last show in 2013, and shortly after Chamberlain announced his intentions to start work on a new band, Sleepwave. They released their debut single "Rock and Roll is Dead and So Am I" in October of that same year.

The band's first tour came in early 2014, with Tonight Alive as a supporting for Taking Back Sunday and The Used. They announced their signing to Epitaph Records in July. Following this, the band released several new songs off their debut album, "Through the Looking Glass" and "The Wolf", as well as corresponding music videos. The dates for their first headlining tour in August and September.

Their debut effort, Broken Compass, was released on September 16, 2014. It reached number 4 on the Top Heatseekers chart in the U.S. It has been met with generally positive reviews. The overall album has "retained the muscularity of Chamberlain's former band while introducing ambient and industrial textures into the mix, resulting in a melodic and accessible sound that leans harder toward the modern hard rock spectrum." "Through the Looking Glass" charted at number 37 on the Mainstream Rock Songs chart.

Sleepwave planned on touring through 2015 in support of Broken Compass. In late 2015 they also opened for a reunited Armor for Sleep, who were touring to celebrate the 10th anniversary of their 2005 album, What to Do When You Are Dead.

Chamberlain returned to Underoath in 2016. He confirmed that Sleepwave has been "done since 2016" via Twitter/X, stating that "It became too toxic" and that he "didn't need two heavy projects at the same time".

== Band members ==
Current

- Spencer Chamberlain – vocals, guitars, keyboards, programming (2013–2016)
- Stephen Bowman – guitars, bass guitars, keyboards, programming (2013–2016)

Touring musicians

- Jesse Shelley – drums, percussion (2014–2016)
- Jack Burns – guitar, keyboards (2014–2016; formerly of Oceana)
- Joshua McLin – bass (2014–2015)
- Casey Jago – bass (2015–2016)

== Discography ==
- Broken Compass (2014)
