= 777 (video) =

Video by Underoath
- Released: July 17, 2007
- Recorded: Red Light Management, St. Petersburg, Florida, various venues
- Genre: Metalcore, post-hardcore, emo
- Length: 99:00
- Label: Solid State, Tooth & Nail
- Producer: Randy Nichols; Underoath

Professional ratings
Review scores
Source	Rating
Allmusic	3.5/5 stars

777 is the first DVD by American rock band Underoath. It was released in the United States and other countries on July 17, 2007, with the intention of having the numbers of its release date coincide with the DVD title.

The DVD is split into three sections: "Moments Suspended in Time"; the "MySpace Secret Show", which was played in St. Petersburg, Florida; and a music video section. The three music videos included are the final products of Underoath's video shoot in Skellefteå, Sweden with Popcore Films. The making of the music video for "You're Ever So Inviting" is exclusively recorded on the DVD as well.

== DVD track listing ==
=== Moments Suspended in Time ===
- 06.20.06 – Hot Topic signing at Countryside Mall – MySpace secret show "Behind the Scenes" footage
- 04.28.06 – European Tour
- 10.30.06 – Paris, France
- 10.08.06 – New Zealand & Australia
- 04.22.06 – London
- 10.21.06 – Japan
- 05.31.06 – MTV, NYC
- 05.07.06 – Bamboozle
- 05.04.06 – US Tour with Poison the Well & As Cities Burn
- 07.07.06 – Somewhere in Canada
- 05.06.06 – Allentown, PA
- 01.30.07 – Sweden
- 06.20.06 – One More Song

=== MySpace Secret Show (6/20/06) ===
- "I Don't Feel Very Receptive Today"
- "It's Dangerous Business Walking Out Your Front Door"
- "Writing on the Walls"
- "The Impact of Reason"
- "In Regards to Myself"
- "Everyone Looks So Good from Here"
- "A Boy Brushed Red Living in Black and White"

=== Music Videos ===
- "Writing on the Walls"
- "In Regards to Myself"
- "You're Ever So Inviting"

== Awards ==
In 2008, the album received was nominations for a Dove Award for Long Form Music Video of the Year at the 39th GMA Dove Awards.
