= Erase Me (album) =

Studio album by Underoath
- Released: April 6, 2018
- Recorded: Mid-2017
- Genres: Alternative rock; hard rock; post-hardcore
- Length: 40:10
- Label: Fearless
- Producer: Matt Squire

Underoath chronology
Anthology: 1999–2013 (2012)	Erase Me (2018)	Voyeurist (2022)

Singles from Erase Me
- 1. "On My Teeth" Released: February 22, 2018; 2. "Rapture" Released: March 19, 2018; 3. "ihateit" Released: July 31, 2018

Erase Me is the eighth studio album by American rock band Underoath. It is their first album in eight years following Ø (Disambiguation) (2010), marking the longest gap between two studio albums in the band's career, and their first one with founding drummer and clean vocalist Aaron Gillespie since Lost in the Sound of Separation (2008). It was recorded in mid-2017 with Matt Squire and mixed by Ken Andrews. The album was released via Fearless Records on April 6, 2018.

== Background ==
Upon announcing the album, the band updated their Spotify biography to read: "The band who once openly—and without apology—professed their faith-based worldview onstage nightly, have since moved beyond the realm of seemingly impenetrable polemics. At various junctures, Erase Me illustrates those moments of sanctuary, anxiety, betrayal and conflict that inevitably arise when humanity grapples with belief systems."

Drummer Gillespie said of the album, "We've had success and we've come through a lot of waters. There's been 11,000 things we've been through so you would think, almost rhetorically, 'What do you need now?' All of us are finally in that place in our lives where the only thing we care about is inclusion for everybody—for the world. For me, exclusion is the scariest thing in the world. And I think Underoath coming back now with a new record—which none of us thought was possible—we want people to know that this is your music and you can feel however the fuck you want about it. I just want to prove that we are doing everything in the most honest way we ever have. This is the healthiest we've ever been as a group of people, as musicians, and in our worldview."

== Critical reception ==
Professional ratings
Aggregate scores
Source	Rating
Metacritic	72/100
Review scores
Source	Rating
AllMusic	3.5/5 stars
Exclaim!	8/10
Kerrang!	3/5 stars
New Noise Magazine	4.5/5 stars
Sputnikmusic	3/5 stars

The album received positive reviews upon release with some publications praising the chemistry between screamer Spencer Chamberlain and singer Aaron Gillespie as well as Christopher Dudley's programming while many fans criticized the band for the album's sound focusing on alternative rock more than the metalcore of their back catalog.

New Noise gave the album a mostly positive review, stating "The whole album is a throwback to when albums flowed together purposefully – much like how Define the Great Line embraced the push and pull of inter-album dynamics. Erase Me is a full-album experience that feels like a bridge between Underoath's previous four records and vocalist Spencer Chamberlain's electronic rock project Sleepwave. Christopher Dudley's synth-work and programming, along with pulsing bass-lines from Grant Brandell result in the most industrialized version of the band yet. However, the stars of the show are Chamberlain and drummer Aaron Gillespie, whose kit work is as impressive as ever ('On My Teeth' will make fans smile). Their vocal trade-offs skew fairly heavily toward Chamberlain's dexterous pipes, which makes sense in keeping with the darker sound. It doesn't always work, most notably in sections of 'Rapture' and 'I Give Up' that feel a bit out of sorts"

Metal Injection wrote of the album that "'Rapture' might not be an immediate hit with Underoath fans, and there are a couple of other tracks with the same flavor as such, ('Wake Me'), but there are plenty of other tracks to chew on. 'On My Teeth' is a great mix of their hectic side while still being able to bring it down with a clean and melodic chorus. 'Hold Your Breath' will also persuade you to circle a pit as soon as it drops. And at the same time, a song like 'ihateit' has also been stuck in my head for several days now. Again, an album like this could have been released immediately after Ø and it wouldn't have appeared to have been a departure."

MetalSucks gave the album 2 out of 5 stars and explained "It's not a boring listen per se, but it's not fresh. A significant portion of the material here feels like something bands like Bring Me the Horizon and Norma Jean beat into the ground circa in the late '00s and early '10s. While I'm sure some fans will be content with that, if you're anything like me you'll find yourself wondering whether or not any of this was worth your time."

Sputnikmusic gave the album 3 out of 5 further elaborating "Unintentionally or otherwise, Spencer's Music Feeds interview divided the band's creatives into himself and Aaron, the pop songwriters, while Tim and Chris bring the heavy and experimental material. It's probably not that black-and-white in reality, but it's an easy narrative I think many will adopt in Erase Me's wake, looking for ways to shift and pinpoint the blame on why the album is a relative disappointment."

== Track listing ==
No.	Title	Writer(s)	Length
1.	"It Has to Start Somewhere"	Underoath	3:11
2.	"Rapture"	Underoath; Johnny Andrews	3:34
3.	"On My Teeth"	Underoath; Matt Squire	3:10
4.	"Wake Me"	Underoath; Andrews	3:40
5.	"Bloodlust"	Underoath	3:32
6.	"Sink with You"	Underoath; Squire	4:44
7.	"ihateit"	Underoath	3:27
8.	"Hold Your Breath"	Underoath	3:29
9.	"No Frame"	Underoath	3:46
10.	"In Motion"	Underoath; John Feldmann	3:35
11.	"I Gave Up"	Underoath; Squire	4:02
Total length:			40:10

Bonus 7-inch vinyl
No.	Title	Length
12.	"Loneliness"	3:39
Total length:		43:49

Target Edition bonus tracks
No.	Title	Length
13.	"Another Life"	4:13
Total length:		48:02

Deluxe Edition bonus tracks
No.	Title	Length
14.	"Heart-Shaped Box (Acoustic) (Nirvana cover)"	4:51
15.	"Wake Me (Acoustic)"	4:13
16.	"On My Teeth (3TEETH Remix)"	3:05
Total length:		1:00:11

== Personnel ==
Underoath

- Spencer Chamberlain – lead vocals, additional guitars
- Timothy McTague – guitars, bass, backing vocals
- Christopher Dudley – keyboards, synthesizers
- Aaron Gillespie – drums, clean vocals, piano

Production

- Matt Squire – production
- Eric Taft – additional production, engineering
- Ken Andrews – mixing
- Ted Jensen – mastering at Sterling Sound, NYC

== Charts ==
Chart performance
Chart (2018)	Peak position
Australian Albums (ARIA)	52
Canadian Albums (Billboard)	67
UK Album Downloads (Official Charts)	91
UK Rock & Metal Albums (Official Charts)	19
US Billboard 200	16
US Top Hard Rock Albums (Billboard)	1
US Top Rock Albums (Billboard)	4
