= Survive, Kaleidoscope =

Survive, Kaleidøscøpe

Live album by Underoath
- Released: May 27, 2008
- Recorded: October 2007
- Genre: Metalcore
- Length: 53:42
- Label: Tooth & Nail
- Producers: Beau Burchell, Underoath

Underoath chronology
Define the Great Line (2006)	Survive, Kaleidøscøpe (2008)	Lost in the Sound of Separation (2008)

Album artwork
- Album art underneath slip cover

Professional ratings
Review scores
Source	Rating
Absolute Punk	83%
AllMusic	4/5 stars
Artistdirect	4/5 stars
Cross Rhythms	8/10 stars
Jesus Freak Hideout	3.5/5 stars
Today's Christian Music	mostly favorable

Survive, Kaleidoscope is the first live album by American rock band Underoath. It is released as a CD/DVD box set and was released on May 27, 2008. The DVD contains a full live set performed in Philadelphia, Pennsylvania. It is also available for digital download on iTunes.

== Track listing ==
Cities in which the tracks were recorded are listed in parentheses.

No.	Title	Length
1.	"Returning Empty Handed" (Sayreville, New Jersey)	6:48
2.	"In Regards to Myself" (Buffalo, New York)	3:01
3.	"It's Dangerous Business Walking Out Your Front Door" (Dallas, Texas)	3:49
4.	"You're Ever So Inviting" (Baltimore, Maryland)	4:09
5.	"To Whom It May Concern" (Boise, Idaho)	5:39
6.	"A Moment Suspended in Time" (Worcester, Massachusetts)	3:53
7.	"Young and Aspiring" (Norfolk, Virginia)	2:49
8.	"Writing on the Walls" (Chicago, Illinois)	4:06
9.	"Everyone Looks So Good from Here" (Omaha, Nebraska)	5:01
10.	"Casting Such a Thin Shadow" (Baltimore, Maryland)	6:13
11.	"Moving for the Sake of Motion" (Saint Paul, Minnesota)	3:19
12.	"A Boy Brushed Red Living in Black and White" (Sayreville, New Jersey)	4:55
Total length:		53:42

=== DVD: "Live from The Electric Factory, Philadelphia, PA" ===
Lighting and set design: Jeff Verne. Sound recording: Andy Vickery.

1. "Intro (Sālmarnir)"
2. "Returning Empty Handed"
3. "In Regards to Myself"
4. "It's Dangerous Business Walking Out Your Front Door"
5. "You're Ever So Inviting"
6. "To Whom It May Concern"
7. "A Moment Suspended in Time"
8. "Young and Aspiring" (misnamed "Returning Empty Handed")
9. "There Could Be Nothing After This"
10. "Writing on the Walls"
11. "Everyone Looks So Good from Here"
12. "Casting Such a Thin Shadow"
13. "Moving for the Sake of Motion"
14. "A Boy Brushed Red...Living in Black and White"
