= Act of Depression =

Studio album by Underoath
- Released: July 4, 1999
- Recorded: March 1999
- Studios: Audiolab Studios, Tampa, Florida
- Genres: Metalcore; death metal
- Length: 55:55
- Label: Takehold
- Producer: James Paul Wisner

Underoath chronology
Act of Depression (1999)	Cries of the Past (2000)

Act of Depression is the debut studio album by American rock band Underoath. Released July 4, 1999, through Takehold Records, the album was out of print for some time as there were only 2,000 copies originally released. Solid State reissued this album alongside Cries of the Past on August 20, 2013.

== Background and recording ==
Underoath formed on November 30, 1997 in Ocala, Florida by vocalist Dallas Taylor and guitarist Luke Morton. Morton was the one who came up with the band's name. The two would recruit guitarist Corey Steger, bassist Octavio Fernandez, and drummer Aaron Gillespie from Tampa. The members were all in high school at the time.

After a year of touring throughout Florida, the band were signed to the Alabama-based label Takehold Records; around this time, Morton would leave the band. Underoath would record their debut album, Act of Depression, in March 1999. The album was produced by James Paul Wisner at Audiolab Studios in Tampa. Act of Depression would be released four months later on July 4.

== Musical content and style ==
The style of this album has been described as metalcore, and more specifically "a brutal combination of first-wave metalcore, death metal and even spastic notes of grindcore." The songs featured on this album and Cries of the Past are notably longer in runtime than the lengths of songs found in the band's later library, with "A Love So Pure" and the title track each exceeding over 10 minutes.

== Reception ==
Professional ratings
Review scores
Source	Rating
Alternative Press	2/5 stars
Jesus Freak Hideout	3/5 stars

Act of Depression overall received mixed reviews.

Casey Boland of Alternative Press stated that the album sounds "hopelessly dated" by modern standards and that the songs are "complicated seemingly for the sake of being complicated." Boland wrote the album has "flashes of brilliance" but "doesn’t have the creative legs to stand the test of time." Boland concluded his review by saying "Despite its many flaws, Act Of Depression is a curious look at the humble beginnings of an influential band."

Opening track, "Heart of Stone", would later appear on the band's 2012 compilation Anthology: 1999–2013.

In 2023, Act of Depression was ranked last on Revolver's list of Underoath albums "From Worst to Best". The author said that while Underoath never released a bad album, they said Act of Depression was "severely underdeveloped."

== Track listing ==
All tracks are written by Underoath.

No.	Title	Length
1.	"Heart of Stone"	5:50
2.	"A Love So Pure"	10:39
3.	"Burden in Your Hands"	6:28
4.	"Innocence Stolen"	6:35
5.	"Act of Depression"	10:23
6.	"Watch Me Die"	6:56
7.	"Spirit of a Living God" (acoustic hidden track; sometimes credited as "Praise")	9:08
Total length:		55:55

On the 2013 re-release, "Spirit of a Living God" was removed, as well as the audio sample in the beginning of "Innocence Stolen".

== Personnel ==
Underoath

- Dallas Taylor – lead vocals
- Corey Steger – guitar, backing vocals, acoustic guitar and spoken commentary on "Spirit of a Living God"
- Octavio Fernandez – bass
- Aaron Gillespie – drums, backing vocals on "A Love So Pure", lead vocals on "Spirit of a Living God"

Additional

- James Paul Wisner – producer
- Greg – engineer
- Josh – mastering
- Tim Baron – illustrations, cover art
- Ryan Clark – reissue art
