= Spencer Chamberlain =

American singer

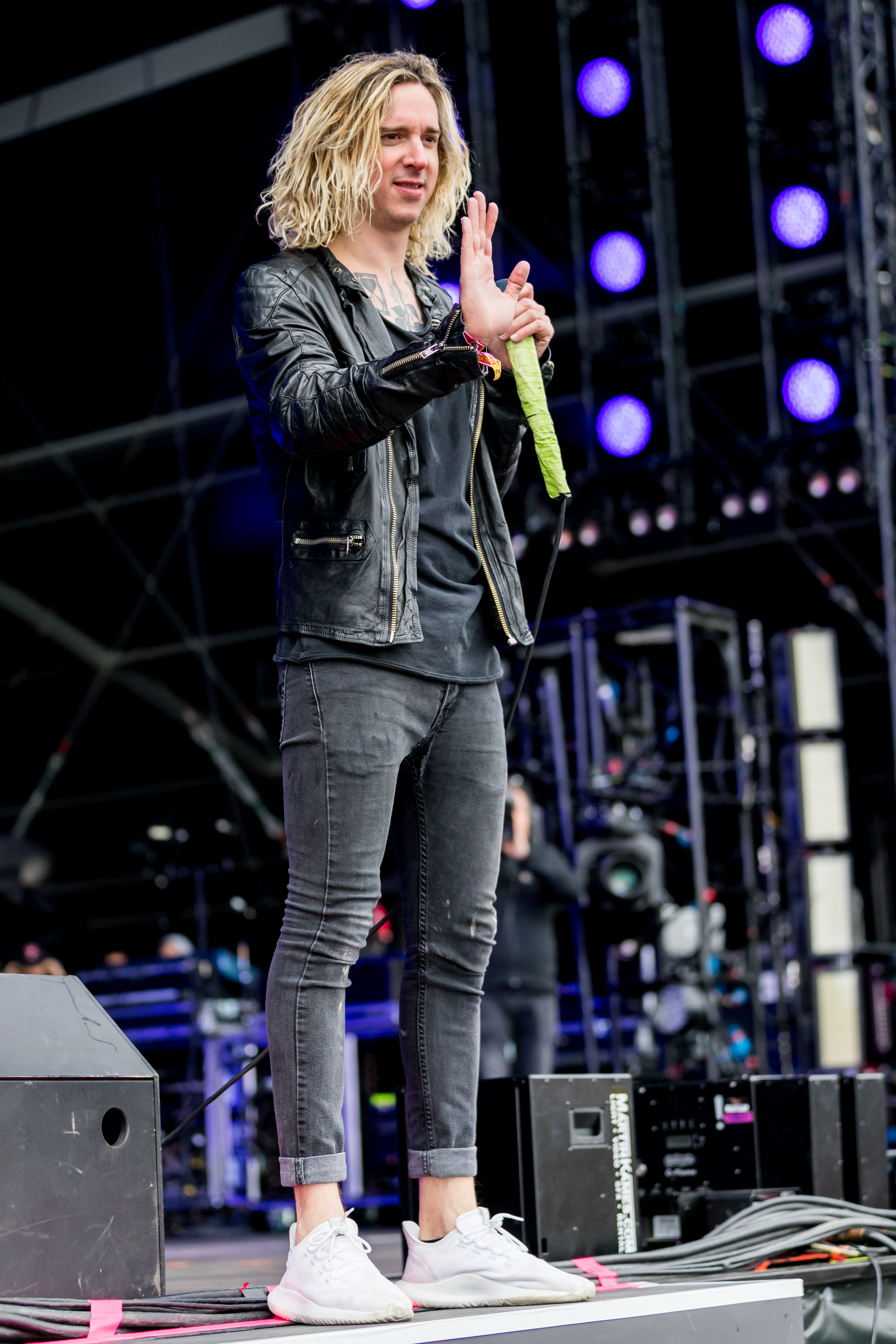
- Chamberlain at Rock am Ring 2019

Background information
- Born: January 4, 1983 (age 43); Chapel Hill, North Carolina, U.S.
- Genres: Post-hardcore; metalcore; alternative rock; emo; Christian metal; screamo
- Occupations: Musician, singer
- Instruments: Vocals; guitar; bass; keyboards
- Years active: 2003–present
- Member of: Underoath; SLO/TIDE
- Formerly of: Nine Down and This Runs Through; Sleepwave

Spencer Chamberlain (born January 4, 1983) is an American musician who is the lead vocalist for the rock band Underoath. Before fronting Underoath, Chamberlain was the vocalist for the band This Runs Through in which his brother, Phil, was the drummer (who is also the drummer for To Speak of Wolves).

== Background ==
Spencer Chamberlain was born in Chapel Hill, North Carolina, and raised in Greensboro, North Carolina, with his mother, and older brother, Phil (also a musician as the drummer for Sullivan and To Speak of Wolves). As a child, Chamberlain's family was well-to-do and had enough money to pay tuition at Greensboro Day School. Chamberlain's parents divorced when he was in elementary school at Greensboro Day School. Chamberlain also struggled with substance abuse. He tells Alternative Press, "You know how some people have a good family or a girlfriend that's always there for them and never fails? That was [what] drugs [were] for me. That was my weakness." He particularly had problems with a serious addiction to cocaine. Chamberlain soon went on to Page High School. Shortly after graduating high school, he moved to Florida. He continued to struggle, until his stepbrother, a pastor, introduced him to Christianity.

However, in a 2018 interview, Chamberlain stated, "I'm not saying religion is wrong for everyone, but for me it was wrong. It ruined my life, turned me into a drug addict and people were awful to me the whole time. I never felt more alone in my life than when I was Christian."

== Career ==
Before Chamberlain joined Underoath, he was in several bands based out of Greensboro, North Carolina called, I.r.e. , NINE DOWN and This Runs Through. They released a five-song EP, Until Forever Finds Me.

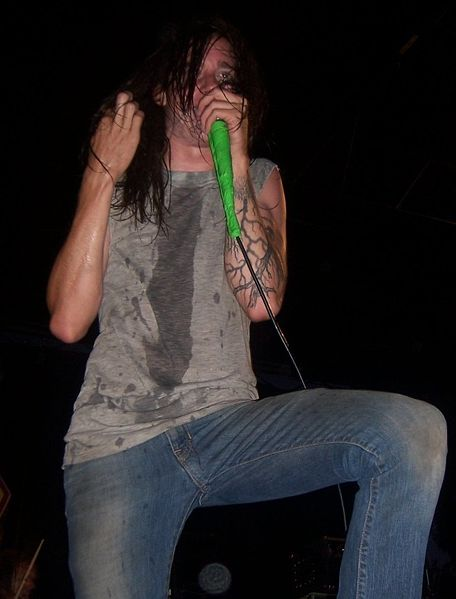
Chamberlain at 2006's Warped Tour

In late 2003, former lead vocalist of Underoath, Dallas Taylor (currently the vocalist for Maylene and the Sons of Disaster), left the band. Later in October of that same year at the CMJ Fest, Chamberlain took the stage as the new lead vocalist. During the early months of 2004, the band recorded their first album with Chamberlain and their second record for Solid State Records.

Chamberlain has released seven albums with Underoath, They're Only Chasing Safety (2004), Define the Great Line (2006), Lost in the Sound of Separation (2008), Ø (2010), Erase Me (2018), Voyeurist (2022), and The Place After This One (2025). When Define the Great Line was released on June 20, 2006, it sold 98,004 copies within its first week and debuted on the Billboard 200 Chart at No. 2. After They're Only Chasing Safety, Chamberlain worked with Melissa Cross to add deeper screaming into the mix. Chamberlain then noted that his vocals on Define The Great Line sound less like imitations of Dallas Taylor's vocals, and more similar to the vocals that he used in his previous band, This Runs Through. His evolved vocals came with the help of Melissa Cross, who coached Chamberlain and refined his "growl". Alternative Press noted, "his bellow [is] more carnal and guttural, [and] his high end more tuneful than whiny. Now when Chamberlain's relating those things that eat at the edges of his conscience and his soul, he has the kind of multi-faceted caterwaul to convey that despair." The article also comments on his songwriting, saying that it "reaches inward, confronting every ugly crevice of his being, often emerging from the clash furious and disoriented, but hopeful."

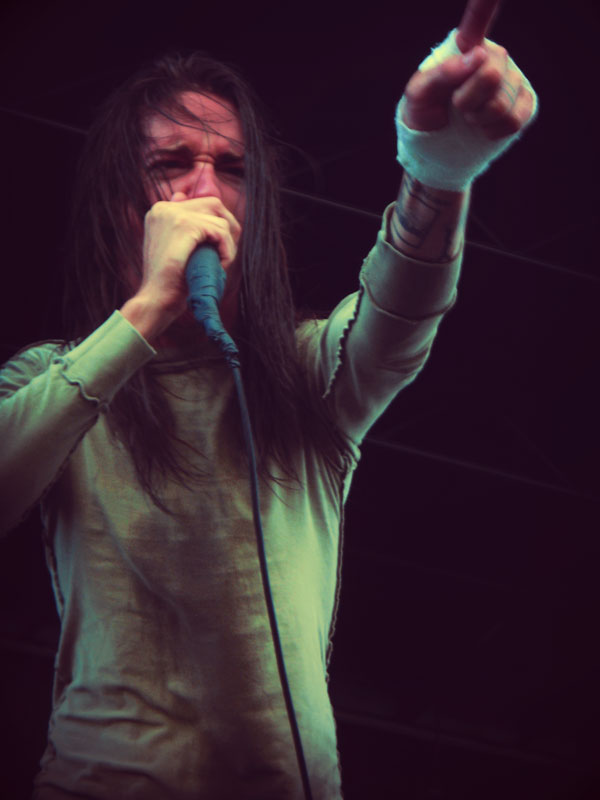
Chamberlain performing with Underoath at 2008's Mayhem Festival

In 2010, Chamberlain made a guest appearance on the track "Quercus Alba" by To Speak of Wolves. The song is included on their debut album Myself < Letting Go. Chamberlain's brother, Phil, is the drummer for the band.

In 2013, Underoath played their final tour before disbanding, though Chamberlain implied that he himself would pursue further musical endeavors. Later in the year, Chamberlain announced his new band Sleepwave, along with plans for a debut single, "Rock and Roll is Dead and So Am I". In July 2014, it was announced that their debut album, Broken Compass, is to be released on September 16, 2014 via Epitaph Records which features their debut single, "Through the Looking Glass".

In 2016, Underoath regrouped for a series of shows dubbed 'Rebirth' playing 'They're Only Chasing Safety' and 'Define the Great Line' in full. They have since toured supporting Bring Me the Horizon.

On February 22, 2018, Underoath announced their eighth studio album, Erase Me, would be released on April 6, 2018; their first album in 8 years and their first in 10 years with founding drummer Aaron Gillespie. The first single was "On My Teeth."

== Discography ==
=== With Nine Down and This Runs Through ===
- Until Forever Finds Me (EP) (2003)

=== With Underoath ===
- They're Only Chasing Safety (2004)
- Define the Great Line (2006)
- Lost in the Sound of Separation (2008)
- Ø (2010)
- Erase Me (2018)
- Voyeurist (2022)
- The Place After This One (2025)

=== With Sleepwave ===
- Broken Compass (2014)

=== With SLO/TIDE ===
- Neck High (Single) (2021)
- Lay Low (Single) (2023)
- It Always Seemed Easier (Single) (2023)
- Too Much Weight (Single) (2023)
- Don't Trip (Single) (2023)
- Crazy (Single) (2024)
- Rather Be Blind (Single) (2024)
- Coffin (Single) (2025)
- Blood Hungry (Single) (2025)

=== Guest appearances ===
- Silent Planet – Psychescape (Everything Was Sound) (2016)
- Brand of Sacrifice – Enemy (Non-album single) (2021)
- Scary Kids Scaring Kids – Omens (Out of Light) (2022)
- Sleeping With Sirens – Crosses (Complete Collapse) (2022)
- August Burns Red – Reckoning (Death Below) (2023)
- Born of Osiris – Activated (Through Shadows) (2025)

== Bands ==
Current

- Underoath (2003–2013; 2015–present)
- Sleepwave (2013–present)
- SLO/TIDE (2021–present)

Former

- Nine Down and This Runs Through (2000–2003)

Touring

- Taking Back Sunday (2013)
