= Ø (Disambiguation) =

Studio album by Underoath
- Released: November 9, 2010
- Recorded: May–July 2010
- Studios: Glow in the Dark, Atlanta, Georgia
- Genres: Metalcore; post-hardcore
- Length: 38:42
- Labels: Solid State; Tooth & Nail
- Producers: Matt Goldman; Jeremy Griffith

Underoath chronology
Lost in the Sound of Separation (2008)	Ø (Disambiguation) (2010)	Anthology: 1999–2013 (2012)

Singles from Ø (Disambiguation)
- 1. "In Division" Released: November 2, 2010; 2. "Paper Lung" Released: February 21, 2011

Ø (Disambiguation) is the seventh studio album by American rock band Underoath. Released on November 9, 2010, through Solid State and Tooth & Nail Records, the album was the band's only without founding member Aaron Gillespie, and is the first and only record by the band with Daniel Davison, formerly of Norma Jean. It was also their final album before a two-year breakup from 2013 to 2015. They would not release another studio album until 2018's Erase Me. Ø (Disambiguation) was met with acclaim and was recorded at Glow in the Dark Studios in Atlanta, Georgia, the same studio where the band's previous album, Lost in the Sound of Separation was recorded.

== Recording and production ==
During a late 2009 interview, guitarist Timothy McTague stated that the band had "just started writing songs that may be included on the next record", and that they hoped to enter the studio late summer or early fall 2010. On April 5, 2010, the band announced the departure of drummer and vocalist, Aaron Gillespie. On May 12, Underoath announced that they will be entering the studio on May 24 to record their next session. Ex–Norma Jean drummer Daniel Davison had been recruited for drumming duties. Sessions were held at Glow in the Dark Studios in Atlanta, Georgia, with producers Matt Goldman and Jeremy Griffith. The drum tracks were edited by Justin Chapman, before being mixed by Ben Grosse at The Mix Room in Burbank, California. Ted Jensen then mastered the recordings at Sterling Sound.

== Name ==
Regarding the album's name, guitarist James Smith recounted:

When we were recording it in the studio, the idea originally came about of a self-titled record. We’d never done a self-titled, and there was nothing really popping out at that time of what to call the record. From there, it translated into a cover visual of just the Ø slash that the band is known for. When it came time to do the art and the self-titled approach we’d agreed upon, I think Tim [McTague, guitarist] or Chris [Dudley, keyboardist] looked up the meaning of the symbol and disambiguation was one of the meanings for the actual symbol itself. So that’s kind of the crazy evolution, which isn’t all that epic or prophetic by any means. [laughs]

Along the same lines, bassplayer Grant explained:

Its basically the symbol, the Ø, its one of the definitons for it. The definition we picked was because it means "ambiguous", and we felt that especially with this record losing the last original member and just still continuing on, it definitely describes our band isnt about one person or thing, but UnderOATH as whole as art moving forwards.

== Release and promotion ==
In July and August 2010, the band appeared on the Cool Tour alongside As I Lay Dying and Between the Buried and Me. A postcard containing a piece of the artwork was sent to each person who pre-ordered the album. The buyer was to take a picture of that postcard and upload it to Underoath's official website. Once every piece had been uploaded, the band would release the artwork. Artwork was unveiled at 1 pm EST, September 21, 2010.

Underoath hosted a game on their Twitter and Facebook profiles. It consisted of scrambled titles for tracks featured on the album. The first person who unscrambled the words won an Underoath T-shirt. The band also released one of their new songs, "Illuminator", by layers, giving away one instrument's part at a time. The song was fully uploaded on October 1, 2010. The second song Underoath released was the single "In Division" on November 2.

The band also developed a contest for the track "Catch Myself Catching Myself". The song was uploaded to YouTube on October 28; however, all the vocals were taken out. The lyrics were put up in the video, and viewers were told to put their own vocals over the song and upload it to YouTube. The submission chosen to be best would receive an Underoath prize pack containing a shirt, poster, stickers and more, and the guitar used for the video of "In Division". Two runners-up would receive the prize pack only.

A music video for "In Division" was released on November 1, 2010.

A music video for "Paper Lung" was released on April 25, 2011.

== Reception ==
Professional ratings
Aggregate scores
Source	Rating
Metacritic	83/100
Review scores
Source	Rating
AbsolutePunk	94%
AllMusic	4/5 stars
Big Cheese	5/5
Billboard	4/5 stars
Blare Magazine	4/5 stars
Consequence of Sound	B
Jesusfreakhideout	4.5/5 stars
Metal1.info	9.5/10
Rock Sound	9/10
Sputnikmusic	4/5

Ø (Disambiguation) was met with positive reviews from music critics. At Metacritic, which assigns a normalized rating out of 100 to reviews from mainstream publications, the album received an average score of 83, based on eight reviews.

In its first week, Ø (Disambiguation) sold 24,000 and debuted at No. 23 on the Billboard 200 charts.

== Track listing ==
All music written by Underoath. All lyrics by Spencer Chamberlain.

No.	Title	Length
1.	"In Division"	3:58
2.	"Catch Myself Catching Myself"	3:29
3.	"Paper Lung"	4:11
4.	"Illuminator"	3:10
5.	"Driftwood"	3:00
6.	"A Divine Eradication"	3:16
7.	"Who Will Guard the Guardians"	3:52
8.	"Reversal"	1:43
9.	"Vacant Mouth"	3:53
10.	"My Deteriorating Incline"	3:33
11.	"In Completion"	4:20
Total length:		38:42

Deluxe Edition bonus tracks
No.	Title	Length
12.	"Paper Lung" (machineA remix)	3:44
13.	"In Division" (Toxic Avenger remix)	3:31
14.	"Catch Myself Catching Myself" (Innerpartysystem remix)	4:26
Total length:		49:43

== Personnel ==
Personnel per booklet.

Underoath

- Spencer Chamberlain – vocals
- Timothy McTague – guitar
- James Smith – guitar
- Grant Brandell – bass guitar
- Christopher Dudley – keyboards
- Daniel Davison – drums

Additional musicians

- Jeremy Griffith – additional bass guitar (track 5)

Production

- Matt Goldman – producer, engineer
- Jeremy Griffith – producer, engineer
- Ben Grosse – mixing
- Ted Jensen – mastering
- Justin Chapman – assistance, drum editing
- Joe Butler – studio assistance
- Jordan Butcher – art direction, design, collage
- Underoath – art direction
- Brandon Ebel – executive producer

== Charts ==
Chart performance for Ø (Disambiguation)
Chart (2010)	Peak position
Australian Albums (ARIA)	74
Canadian Albums (Billboard)	41
US Billboard 200	23
US Top Christian Albums (Billboard)	1
US Top Rock Albums (Billboard)	4
