= Define the Great Line =

Studio album by Underoath
- Released: June 20, 2006
- Recorded: January–March 2006
- Studios: Zing Recording, Westfield, Massachusetts; Glow in the Dark, Atlanta, Georgia
- Genres: Metalcore; post-metal; post-hardcore; emo
- Length: 45:54
- Label: Tooth & Nail
- Producers: Adam Dutkiewicz; Matt Goldman; Underoath

Underoath chronology
They're Only Chasing Safety (2004)	Define the Great Line (2006)	Survive, Kaleidoscope (2008)

Special edition cover
- Special edition of Define the Great Line

Singles from Define the Great Line
- 1. "Writing on the Walls" Released: June 27, 2006; 2. "In Regards to Myself" Released: November 27, 2006; 3. "You're Ever So Inviting" Released: January 23, 2007

Define the Great Line is the fifth studio album by American rock band Underoath. It was released on June 20, 2006, through Tooth & Nail Records. Five months after the release of their fourth studio album They're Only Chasing Safety, the band were already in the process of working towards its follow-up. Recording took place between January and March 2006 at Zing Recording Studios in Westfield, Massachusetts, and Glow in the Dark Studios in Atlanta, Georgia, with Adam Dutkiewicz of Killswitch Engage, Matt Goldman and the band as producers. Define the Great Line is predominantly a metalcore and emo album, which has also been tagged as post-metal and post-hardcore. In 2020, John Hill of Loudwire included the album in his list of the "Top 25 Metalcore Albums of All Time." The variety of styles was an unintentional move by the band, who took influence from At the Drive-In, Beloved and Cult of Luna, among others.

Preceded by festival appearances and a headlining tour in the United States, "Writing on the Walls" was released as the first single from Define the Great Line on June 27, 2006. Underoath headlined the main stage of Warped Tour, though dropped off because of tension within the band. They toured Central and South America and Canada, prior to joining the international edition of the Taste of Chaos tour. "In Regards to Myself" appeared as the second single in the midst of this on November 27, 2006, followed by the third single "You're Ever So Inviting" on January 23, 2007. Underoath spent the first half of the year touring North America with Taking Back Sunday, Norma Jean, and Maylene and the Sons of Disaster. They appeared on Warped Tour again, and closed the year with another headlining US tour, which saw drummer Aaron Gillespie temporarily replaced by Kenny Bozich.

Define the Great Line received generally favorable reviews from music critics, many of whom highlighted the various musical styles, and praised Spencer Chamberlain for his growth as a vocalist. The album peaked at number two on the Billboard 200, becoming the highest charting Christian release on said chart since 1997. It was certified gold in the US by the Recording Industry Association of America by the end of 2006; the music video for "Writing on the Walls" was nominated for a 2007 Grammy Award for Best Short Form Music Video. Define the Great Line has been re-pressed on vinyl and performed in its entirety over the years.

== Background and recording ==
Underoath released their fourth studio album They're Only Chasing Safety in June 2004 through Solid State Records. By November 2004, the band had started writing new material for their next album. In April 2005, Underoath had around six new songs, and were performing one of them live around this time. They wrote while on tour; in between treks, they practiced together and recorded demos. Around this time, the band expressed a desire to work with another producer other than James Wisner, who had worked on their preceding three albums. Alongside this, they mentioned that the new songs they had were heavier than their past work and were influenced by the work of Codeseven. In September 2005, they announced that they would be recording their next album in early 2006. Despite being courted by major labels for a few months, they opted to sign with Solid State's parent company Tooth & Nail Records. Drummer Aaron Gillespie said they had better distribution, while vocalist Spencer Chamberlain said that both Solid State and Tooth & Nail shared the same mailing list.

By this point, They're Only Chasing Safety had sold close to 500,000 copies in the United States, selling at a rate of 4,500 per week. Underoath closed out 2005 playing a four-date tour dubbed Come & Live; profits from each show benefitted a separate charity. The shows led into the recording sessions for the band's next album. Define the Great Line was recorded at Zing Recording Studios in Westfield, Massachusetts, and Glow in the Dark, Atlanta, Georgia, with Adam Dutkiewicz of Killswitch Engage, Matt Goldman and the band serving as producers. Dutkiewicz had seen the band live before, and was aware of the sound they were attempting to get. Chamberlain said they had been looking for someone to capture their sound better, which he said was not well-represented on They're Only Chasing Safety. They entered the studios with 19 songs written, which they planned to pare down to 10 or 11. Dutkiewicz pushed the band to toy with different delay and effects pedals. Sessions began in January 2006 and wrapped up two months later in March 2006. Chris Lord-Alge, with assistance from Keith Armstrong, mixed the recordings at Resonate Music in Burbank, California, before the album was mastered by Tom Baker at Precision Mastering in Los Angeles, California.

== Composition and lyrics ==
=== Musical style ===
While most commonly cited as metalcore and emo, the sound of Define the Great Line has also been tagged as Christian metal, post-metal and post-hardcore. Indie Vision Music's Brandon J. noted influences Beloved, the Chariot and Maylene and the Sons of Disaster, while Chamberlain highlighted At the Drive-In and Glassjaw. The album's slower parts recalled the work of Cult of Luna and Isis, and have been said to contain "doom metal overtones". It abandoned the pop choruses of the They're Only Chasing Safety and instead demonstrated a heavier and more eclectic range of styles. The band themselves said that the heavier style was "nothing super intentional, they [the songs] just came out that way when we went to write". Tony Cummings of Cross Rhythms described the album as "an impressively versatile project where metal riffs and emo breakdowns, screamo noise and memorable hooks collide in a veritable sonic feast," and AllMusic described the band as finding the centre point between "throat-shredding grindcore and My Chemical Romance/From Autumn to Ashes-style emo-punk". Loudwire said the album was "Building on the foundation set by Norma Jean and Zao." Chamberlain explained that he switched from a higher pitched scream to a lower pitched one as it felt more natural for him.

Define the Great Line was noted as a turning point for Underoath, with AllMusic commenting that "while the tendency to dissolve into the abyss of angtsy emo-pop was still there," there was a "darkness lurking in the nooks and crannies between the crackling snare hits and heavy 'drop-d' riffing" that would be fully realized on their sixth studio album Lost in the Sound of Separation (2008). Alternative Press mentioned that the band had updated its "early, brutal style with weird time changes and post-metal ambience". Andree Farias of The Fish said the album" not only redefines the sound of Underoath, but also has the potential of redefining the hardcore emo genre". Brandon J. said the guitarwork was "merciless and somewhat chaotic, and the vocals range from the usual middle to high screams all the way to a deep and very powerful growl".

=== Title and lyrical themes ===
The title of the album, according to keyboardist Christopher Dudley, comes from "defining that line for yourself between becoming the man or the woman that you want to be and the man or the woman other people want you to be". Aaron Burgess of Alternative Press used the title as an example of how on this album Underoath seemed "acutely aware of the line that separates their spiritual core from the painful reality of being human," and how "even successful musicians need help staying on the right side of that line".

For its lyrics, the band maintained its focus on Christianity and personal struggles, and according to Josh Taylor of Jesus Freak Hideout the big difference was "the frequency at which God is addressed by name," though all of these mentions were in "exclamations of desperation". The main lyrical themes of the album expressed pain, weariness, and frustration, "but not without the awareness that things need to change". These themes were praised by AllMusic reviewer James Christopher Monger, which stated that "while Underoath explore their faith with both reverence and suspicion, something that sets them apart from the polarizing righteousness of many CCM acts, their crossover potential remains huge, as the prevailing themes of isolation, anger, introspection, and the quest for self-confidence are universal".

Drowned in Sound writer Raziq Rauf said there was "no reason to treat the explicitly religious content" of the release differently from other emo albums, as it "covers the same bases of heartache, frustration and the inevitable exhaustion that results". According to the band the lyrics were personal to Chamberlain, relating aspects of his life that have affected him over the years. Burgess noted Chamberlain's lyrical presence, saying that "between Chamberlain's deeply troubled writing and [...] Gillespie's, Define sounds like a group-therapy session put to tape".

=== Songs ===
The track "In Regards to Myself" opens the album, with Chamberlain expressing the rawest vocals from the band since their second studio album Cries of the Past (2000). It is reminiscent of the work of labelmates Norma Jean, with a number of dissonant guitar parts. "A Moment Suspended in Time" showcases Brandell, McTague, and Smith's contributions to the band. "There Could Be Nothing After This" deals with leaving the past behind in lieu of a life of faith. The metalcore track "You're Ever So Inviting" is followed by "Sálmarnir", a song that consists of the Bible passage Psalm 50 being recited in Russian by a friend of the members. The title comes from the Icelandic word for "Psalms"; for its second half, Dudley is heard repeating it in English in the manner of a Televangelist, backed by the crowd noise. Its ambient electronica sound, powered by Dudley's keyboard parts, recalls the work of Sigur Rós.

"Returning Empty Handed" opens with a quiet instrumental passage, which gives way to a heavier section, before ending acoustically; over the course of its duration, it changes from metalcore to post-metal. “Casting Such a Thin Shadow" touches on post-rock and post-metal in the style of Pelican. It is mainly instrumental until Chamberlain's voice appears four minutes in, which eventually climaxes with his screaming vocals. "Moving for the Sake of Motion" opens with a double bass roll from Gillespie, while it evokes the sound of Failure On-era (2003) Beloved; "Writing on the Walls" also takes influence from Beloved. "Everyone Looks So Good from Here" is another metalcore song. The album closes with the seven minute long "To Whom It May Concern", which features several tempo changes.

== Release and promotion ==
On March 6, 2006, Underoath's next album was announced for release in three months' time. On April 17, 2006, the release was titled Define the Great Line, and "Sálmarnir" was posted on the band's PureVolume account, followed by "Writing on the Walls" at the end of May, and "In Regards to Myself" in June. The music video for "Writing on the Walls" premiered on MTV's Overdrive program on June 13, 2006. According to Dudley, it was influenced by 1960s theatrical films, "depict[ing] a murder mystery in a surrealistic gothic-tinged setting". Define the Great Line was made available for streaming through MTV2's website on June 15, 2006, and released a week later on June 20, 2006, through Tooth & Nail Records. A special edition included a DVD with a making-of documentary on the album. The booklet conveys the story of a man traversing through a desert landscape, who eventually hallucinates and dies. To promote it, the band appeared on MTV's T-Minus Rock and Headbangers Ball, and Fuse's Steven's Untitled Rock Show. Listening parties were held at Hot Topic stories, which was the first time in that company's history. "Writing on the Walls" was released to radio on June 27, 2006.

The music video for "In Regards to Myself" premiered through Yahoo! Music on September 12, 2006; the track was released as a single on November 27, 2006. The video is a critic on people idolizing popstars, with the band being seen partway through playing in a never-ending series of corridors. A DVD version was released that included videos for both "Writing on the Walls" and "In Regards to Myself". Both were filmed in Sweden with the production team Popcore Films; Anders Forsman handled the former, while Linus Johansson did the latter. They opted to shoot them back-to-back due to the restraints of touring. "You're Ever So Inviting" was released to radio on January 23, 2007. On May 14, 2007, the music video for "You're Ever So Inviting", which was filmed in Sweden with Popcore Films earlier in the year, was posted online. In July 2007, the band released their first video album titled 777, which included footage from the 2006 Warped Tour, Taste of Chaos and The Bamboozle Festival. On September 12, 2007, a music video was released for "A Moment Suspended in Time". It was also directed by Popcore Film and was filmed in Sweden.

=== Reissues and full-album performances ===
Define the Great Line was included in the Play Your Old Stuff: An Underoath Anthology (2011) three-CD set, alongside their third studio album The Changing of Times (2002) and They're Only Chasing Safety. "In Regards to Myself", "You're Ever So Inviting", and "Writing on the Walls" were included on the band's second compilation album Anthology: 1999–2013 (2012). "In Regards to Myself" and "Writing on the Walls" were included on third compilation album Icon (2014). Define the Great Line was packaged with They're Only Chasing Safety as a two-LP set to promote the band's Rebirth Tour in 2016, during which they performed both albums in full. Both albums were then included with Lost in the Sound of Separation as part of the Underoath Observatory (2021) vinyl box set. Coinciding this, Underoath performed all three albums in their entireties as part of the Underoath: Observatory livestream series. A 20th anniversary tour for the album was announced in June 2026, in which the band will play the album in full. The band also re-released the album in multiple formats to celebrate its anniversary, including a vinyl re-pressing.

== Touring ==
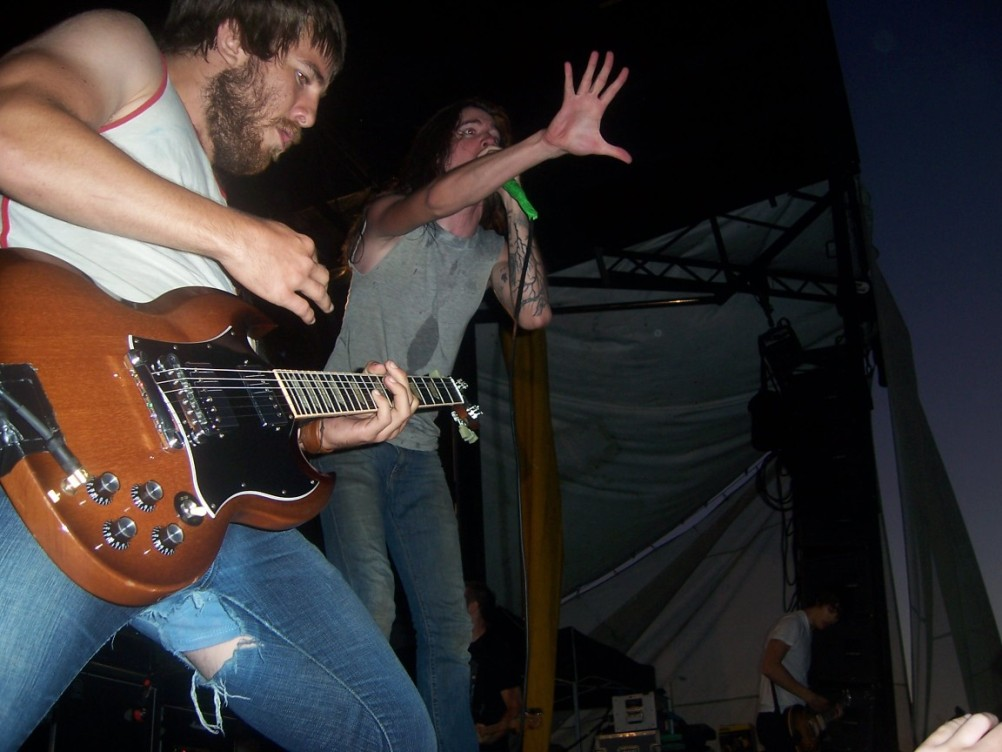
Underoath toured throughout 2006 and 2007 in support of Define the Great Line.

Underoath appeared at the Groezrock festival in Belgium, and the Give it a Name festival in the United Kingdom in April and May 2006, respectively. They then went on a headlining US tour; Poison the Well and As Cities Burn served as main support, while Spitfire and Sincebyman appeared on select dates. The trek included an appearance at The Bamboozle festival. The band headlined the main stage of the Warped Tour, but left it in July 2006 due to issues between band members. Kerrang! reported that this was due to Fat Mike of NOFX making disparaging remarks about the band's religious beliefs. Mike claimed that Chamberlain had been doing cocaine and consuming alcohol on their tour bus, which Underoath's manager denied. Discussing it with MTV, Mike said to have made fun of several bands on the trek without issue. In an interview with Rock Sound, McTague said: "That's society as a whole; politically we cannot get along, religions cannot get along [...] We just need to come to the point where we realise everyone is not going to be like us". Dudley said they re-grouped after a few days and talked about their issues, which helped stop them from breaking up. In September 2006, Underoath went on a tour of Central and South America, which led into a Canadian tour with support from Silverstein, Moneen, and He Is Legend.

In October and November 2006, the group went on the international edition of the Taste of Chaos tour, visiting New Zealand, Australia, Japan and Europe. Between February and April 2007, the band went on a North American tour alongside Taking Back Sunday. In May 2007, the band headlined the short Dirty South Tour in the US, with support from Norma Jean, Maylene and the Sons of Disaster, and the Glass Ocean, before playing a few shows in Australia with Emery in June 2007. From early July to late August 2007, the band went on the Warped Tour. Between late September and early November, the band went on a headlining US tour with support from Every Time I Die, Maylene and the Sons of Disaster, and Poison the Well. During the Las Vegas, Nevada date of the trek, Gillespie was forced to have emergency surgery as he had contracted an infection in his hand. The Almost drummer Kenny Bozich filled for Gillespie's parts; he had been hiking around Utah when he was asked to cover for Gillespie. Bozich listened to the band's songs on the flight over, managing to make it 25 minutes before they went on stage. Chamberlain and McTague covered Gillespie's vocal sections; he re-joined Underoath four days later.

== Reception ==
Professional ratings
Review scores
Source	Rating
AllMusic	3.5/5 stars
Alternative Press	5/5 stars
CCM Magazine	A−
Cross Rhythms	10/10 stars
Drowned in Sound	5/10
Indie Vision Music	10/10
Jesus Freak Hideout	4.5/5 stars
Punknews.org	3.5/5 stars
Rock Hard	8/10
Spin	3/5 stars

Define the Great Line was met with generally favorable reviews from music critics. It is seen as Underoath's big breakthrough into the mainstream by Cummings, while Taylor referred to it as the most anticipated album that year. Both Cummings and Taylor called the album the best hardcore album of the year; Taylor giving the album a near-perfect rating and Cummings gave it a perfect score.

The Kern County Kid of HM called the album "nearly perfect," stating that it was "like one harsh line in the sand that dares its audience to embrace the band on its own terms". Monger described Define the Great Line as a "mammoth production that exemplifies how far Christian metal has come since the days of Stryper and Bloodgood", and called it "blistering and occasionally majestic". Taylor saw it as a release which "somehow still contains the accessibility of their last effort, but kicks everything up a notch". Farias said it said the album "sounds huge, far removed from the tamer and thinner feel of its predecessor" as "every component of the Underoath machine is amplified a hundredfold". Rock Hard's Boris Kaiser noted that the band have "become a whole lot angrier and more violent" than with They're Only chasing Safety. Doug Van Pelt of CCM Magazine said the band "topped itself with an engaging, high quality album" as Goldman and Dutkiewixz "helped the band expand its sound". Spin reviewer Nick Catucci said the new album "adds an extra dose of melody to the dual-guitar, scream-and-sing attack".

Burgess said Chamberlain's stage presence was "fully realized here" as his "throat-shedding roar distinguishes much of Define". He added that Gillespie acts as the "beautiful melodic counterpart to Chamberlain's crushing heaviness". Sputnikmusic staff member John Hanson said Chamberlain used to be an "atrocious screamer", and with the new album, "he has improved somewhat", while Gillespie was a "far more enjoyable vocalist to listen to, even though he could possibly be a tad bit generic". Cummings praised Chamberlain's "stunning repertoire of guttural growls, smooth emoting and nerve-jangling screams". Rauf lambasted Chamberlain's "holier-than-thou preaches" that were in "fewer spurts and shrieks that we're used to," as he used a "greater range of impressive roars and screams" to convey them. Fish was thankful that Chamberlain was "no longer an indiscriminate, undecipherable yeller," but instead a "versatile vocalist" that can bounce "impeccably between feral shrieks, bestial growls, and melodic tones". Punknews.org staff member Brian Shultz noted that there was less singing than with the previous album, "thus providing a nice dynamic as opposed to a chorus".

Define the Great Line debuted at number two on the Billboard 200 charts, selling over 98,000 copies in its first week. It became the highest-charting Christian release since You Light Up My Life: Inspirational Songs by LeAnn Rimes reached the top spot in 1997. Alongside this, it had the biggest first-week sales of any release on Tooth & Nail Records. Define the Great Line was certified gold by the Recording Industry Association of America (RIAA) in November 2006 for selling 500,000 copies. "Writing on the Walls" was nominated for a 2007 Grammy Award for Best Short Form Music Video. In 2017, Loudwire ranked the album 24th on its list of the "25 Greatest Metalcore albums of all-time". Kerang listed Define the Great Line as one of the “21 Greatest Metalcore Albums of All-Time,” specifically highlighting Chamberlin’s “lacerating, confessional vocals” and Gillespie’s “melodic style” drumming. In 2023, Revolver ranked Define the Great Line at number 1 on its list of Underoath albums, praising the songwriting, musicianship, and the back and forth between Chamberlain and Gillespie. It was cited as the band's best album by Bryan Rolli of Loudwire as well in 2025.

== Track listing ==
Lyrics by Spencer Chamberlain and Aaron Gillespie, music by Underoath.

No.	Title	Length
1.	"In Regards to Myself"	3:24
2.	"A Moment Suspended in Time"	3:59
3.	"There Could Be Nothing After This"	3:26
4.	"You're Ever So Inviting"	4:13
5.	"Sálmarnir" ("Psalms")	2:57
6.	"Returning Empty Handed"	4:27
7.	"Casting Such a Thin Shadow"	6:13
8.	"Moving for the Sake of Motion"	3:15
9.	"Writing on the Walls"	4:02
10.	"Everyone Looks So Good from Here"	2:56
11.	"To Whom It May Concern"	7:02
Total length:		45:54

== Personnel ==
Personnel per booklet, except where noted.

Underoath

- Spencer Chamberlain – lead vocals
- Timothy McTague – lead guitar
- James Smith – rhythm guitar
- Grant Brandell – bass guitar
- Christopher Dudley – keyboards, synthesizers, samplers
- Aaron Gillespie – drums, clean vocals

Production and design

- Adam Dutkiewicz – producer
- Matt Goldman – producer
- Underoath – producer
- Chris Lord-Alge – mixing
- Keith Armstrong – assistant
- Chandler Owen – art direction, packaging
- Jeff Gros – photography
- Tom Baker – mastering

== Charts ==
Chart performance for Define the Great Line
Chart (2006)	Peak position
Australian Albums (ARIA)	28
Canadian Albums (Nielsen SoundScan)	14
New Zealand Albums (RMNZ)	37
UK Rock & Metal Albums (Official Charts)	18
US Billboard 200	2
US Top Christian Albums (Billboard)	1
US Top Rock Albums (Billboard)	1

== Certifications ==
Certifications for Define the Great Line
Region	Certification	Certified units/sales
United States (RIAA)	Gold	500,000^{^}
^{^} Shipments figures based on certification alone.
