= Cries of the Past =

Studio album by Underoath
- Released: July 4, 2000
- Recorded: 2000
- Studios: Wisner Productions, Davie, Florida
- Genres: Progressive metalcore; black metal; death metal
- Length: 42:52
- Label: Takehold
- Producer: James Paul Wisner

Underoath chronology
Act of Depression (1999)	Cries of the Past (2000)	The Changing of Times (2002)

Reissue cover

Professional ratings
Review scores
Source	Rating
Alternative Press	2.5/5 stars
Chronicles of Chaos	9.5/10
HM Magazine	*
Jesus Freak Hideout	5/5 stars

Cries of the Past is the second studio album by American rock band Underoath, released on July 4, 2000, through Takehold Records. Only 3,000 copies of the album were pressed and, like Act of Depression, it was out of print for years. The album is the last to feature guitarist Corey Steger and the first to include keyboardist Christopher Dudley. Alongside their debut album, this album was reissued through Solid State Records on August 20, 2013.

This is the band's last album to be released through Takehold Records, as the label was bought by Solid State.

== Musical content and style ==
The second and third song are out of order from the list on the jacket, with "Giving Up Hurts the Most" as the actual second track, while "Walking Away" is the third. The latter is also the shortest song of the album, but with a length of 7:36, with one of the most notorious things about the album being its length; in a time length of 42:08, there are only five songs, all longer than any of the songs the band would make in subsequent albums. The song "And I Dreamt of You" is Underoath's longest recorded song, clocking in at 11 minutes and 24 seconds.

Being the first album to feature Christopher Dudley, it is the first Underoath album to include keyboard effects. The album acquires a similar death metal sound to Act of Depression; however, it notably features a black metal influence.

== Reception ==
Cries of the Past has received mostly positive reviews.

Alex Cantwell of Chronicles of Chaos praised the band's ability to mix hardcore punk and black metal together, saying the album is "Cradle of Filth meets Hatebreed." Sherwin Frias of Jesus Freak Hideout also praised the album, giving it a perfect 5/5. Frias praised the band's musicianship, especially the keyboard work done by Chris Dudley, as well as Dallas Taylor's vocals.

Casey Boland of Alternative Press gave the album a more mixed review. Boland praised the album's better production over the debut Act of Depression and Dudley's performance, stating "Dudley’s contributions add just enough sonic coloring to make the songs somewhat unique." Boland criticized the length of the songs, stating that "And I Dreamt of You" could have been shorter or split into several different songs and said the songs "feel like patchworks of riffs sewn haphazardly together into an ugly quilt of disjointed patterns."

The album's title track would later appear on the band's 2012 compilation album Anthology: 1999–2013.

In 2023, Cries of the Past was ranked at number 8 on Revolver's list of Underoath albums ranked "From Worst to Best." The author noted the album's better production and performances over Act of Depression and praised the inclusion of keyboards, but also stated the album sounds dated and too different from the band's later releases.

== Track listing ==
All tracks are written by Underoath.

No.	Title	Length
1.	"The Last"	7:42
2.	"Giving Up Hurts the Most"	7:47
3.	"Walking Away"	7:36
4.	"And I Dreamt of You"	11:24
5.	"Cries of the Past"	8:23
Total length:		42:52

== Personnel ==
Underoath

- Dallas Taylor – lead vocals
- Corey Steger – lead guitar, backing vocals
- Octavio Fernandez – rhythm guitar
- Matt Clark – bass guitar
- Christopher Dudley – keyboards
- Aaron Gillespie – drums

Additional

- James Paul Wisner – producer
- Karl Ross – cover art
- Ryan Clark – reissue art
