= They're Only Chasing Safety =

Studio album by Underoath
- Released: June 15, 2004
- Recorded: February 2004
- Studios: Wisner Productions, Florida
- Genres: Screamo; post-hardcore; melodic hardcore; emo
- Length: 35:50
- Label: Solid State
- Producer: James Paul Wisner

Underoath chronology
The Changing of Times (2002)	They're Only Chasing Safety (2004)	Define the Great Line (2006)

Singles from They're Only Chasing Safety
- 1. "Reinventing Your Exit" Released: February 22, 2005

They're Only Chasing Safety is the fourth studio album by American rock band Underoath. It was released on June 15, 2004 through Solid State Records. Following the release of their third studio effort The Changing of Times (2002), half of the band's members were replaced. After finalizing the line-up with vocalist Spencer Chamberlain, the band recorded their next release with producer James Paul Wisner at his home studio Wisner Productions in February 2004. The album has been tagged with various genres including screamo and melodic hardcore and features subtle references to Christianity. Drummer Aaron Gillespie had more of a vocal presence to contrast Chamberlain's screams.

Before the album's release, Underoath undertook a tour with their labelmates and later with Eighteen Visions. Throughout 2004, the band went on the Warped Tour before going on their own headlining tour, and closed the year supporting Coheed and Cambria. "Reinventing Your Exit" was released as the lead single in February 2005. An appearance on the inaugural Taste of Chaos tour led to another headlining US tour, shows in Europe and a second spell on Warped Tour. A Canadian tour in late 2005 with the Used preceded a reissue of the album in October 2005.

It received generally favorable reviews from music critics, some of whom highlighted the various musical styles and praised Underoath for its accessibility. The Recording Industry Association of America (RIAA) certified the album gold in the US in 2011, and it was nominated for a Dove Award for best rock album. It has been re-pressed on vinyl and performed in its entirety.

== Background ==
Christian metalcore band Underoath released their third studio album The Changing of Times in February 2002. It was the band's first release through Solid State Records; it marked a line-up change with the appearance of guitarist Timothy McTague and bassist William Nottke. Nottke was replaced with Grant Brandell and guitarist James Smith was brought in. Vocalist Dallas Taylor left the 2003 Warped Tour, and My Synopsis singer Matt Tarpey stood in for him for some shows. Taylor officially left the band in October 2003; Brandell said this was due to personal issues that hampered the band's frequent touring schedule. McTague said Taylor wanted a "more stable environment", explaining that they did not have much money and were touring constantly.

Underoath played shows with This Runs Through, both of which lived in Tampa, Florida. This Runs Through vocalist Spencer Chamberlain was asked to join them but he rejected the offer because he was busy with This Runs Through. After he was told Underoath would otherwise have to cancel the shows, he temporarily joined the band for a few performances. Chamberlain was invited to practice with Underoath when This Runs Through were ending, and asked again to become a member of the band.

== Recording ==
Chamberlain officially joined Underoath in January 2004, and a month later, they recorded their next album. Underoath had worked with producer James Paul Wisner on their past two albums and wanted to work with someone else. They had two other producers in mind but due to timing conflicts, they opted to work with him again. Wisner acted as engineer at recording sessions in his home studio Wisner Productions in Florida. Throughout the making of the album, the members paid rent to stay at Wisner's house. His neighbor repeatedly banged on the door because the room in which Underoath were recording guitars shared a wall with the neighbor. The band learned the neighbor was a nurse and worked nights; the band switched rooms and had to re-record half of the songs.

Keyboardist Christopher Dudley said the guitars were subsequently redone four times and two-to-three times for the bass guitar. He mentioned that they wanted to distance themselves away from the "really clean, polished sounding" material of Wisner's past production work, "but [They're Only Chasing Safety] still has that polished feel to it". Matt Goldman recorded programming and Aaron Marsh's additional vocals. Chamberlain and Gillespie damaged their voices during the recording, and Gillespie was briefly hospitalized with blisters on his tonsils. J.R. McNeely mixed the recordings at Compound Studios in Seattle, Washington, and the album was mastered by Troy Glessner at Spectre Studios. Chamberlain would later remark that the album sounded so "dry and feels just so cut to the core".

== Composition and lyrics ==
The output of Underoath has been categorized as metalcore, and the overall style present on They're Only Chasing Safety has been further described as "melodic [and] emo-leaning". According to Alex Henderson of AllMusic, "this screamo/post-hardcore/melodic hardcore approach is quite different from full-fledged metalcore; while metalcore units like Hatebreed, Brick Bath, and Finland's notoriously ferocious Rotten Sound go right for the jugular, Underoath and similar bands prefer to mix honey with vinegar". Andrew Segal of Cross Rhythms described the album as nu metal, and said it is on "the heavier side of the rock scale." Andrew Sacher, writing for Brooklyn Vegan, referred to They're Only Chasing Safety as "one of melodic metalcore's biggest mainstream breakthroughs". Additionally, some associate the album with scene music.

Henderson said the references to Christianity are more subtle than anything from the band's contemporaries. Brian Flota in his book The Politics of Post-9/11 Music noted unlike other Christian acts, Underoath refer to Jesus by name, whereas others refer to the figure as "Him". The most pop-like tracks on the album, such as "Reinventing Your Exit", were written when Taylor was still a member. Gillespie was given more-vocal presence to contrast with Chamberlain's screams. In the past, Taylor had been the sole lyricist, but for They're Only Chasing Safety, Chamberlain and Gillespie contributed lyrics. Chamberlain said he had to adapt to Gillespie writing chorus sections as he did not listen to many bands with choruses. Chamberlain solely wrote the words to three of the tracks and Gillespie wrote one-to-two by himself, and the rest they wrote together.

McTague used "Your New Aesthetic" (1999) by Jimmy Eat World as a template when writing "A Boy Brushed Red Living in Black and White". Underoath tried to improve upon the demo version's drum break but were unsuccessful and sampled the loops from the demo, which they had made with Goldman, and used it on the album version. "Reinventing Your Exit" evokes the material of Hawthorne Heights; it evolved from the Taylor-sung track "Heatherwood". The interlude track "The Blue Note" was made in an hour; it consists of two layered stock loops. "It's Dangerous Business Walking Out Your Front Door" is a murder ballad that features 1980s-esque electronic parts (further evidenced due to the song's demo being titled "The 80s Song"); it recalls the work of the Used and its bridge section includes a choir from a local church. McTague said the band misled the choir about the song's meaning to persuade them to sing on the album.

With "Down, Set, Go", the band attempted to emulate the style of Brand New's Deja Entendu (2003), with which they were enamored. For the ending of "I'm Content with Losing", McTague performed his part in the style of the Casket Lottery. "Some Will Seek Forgiveness, Others Escape" is reminiscent of the work of Copeland, being anchored around an electronica beat, and was intended to show Underoath "wearing their hearts on their sleeves". McTague said the song deals with a person "realizing the error of [their] ways, asking for forgiveness and making a vow to start over and do what's right". Unlike the rest of the songs on the album, the track was composed within half an hour. Marsh's part in the song deals with him having "both feet out the door with Christianity". "I've Got Ten Friends and a Crowbar That Says You Ain't Gonna Do Jack" was written and recorded for the album's 2005 reissue.

== Release and promotion ==
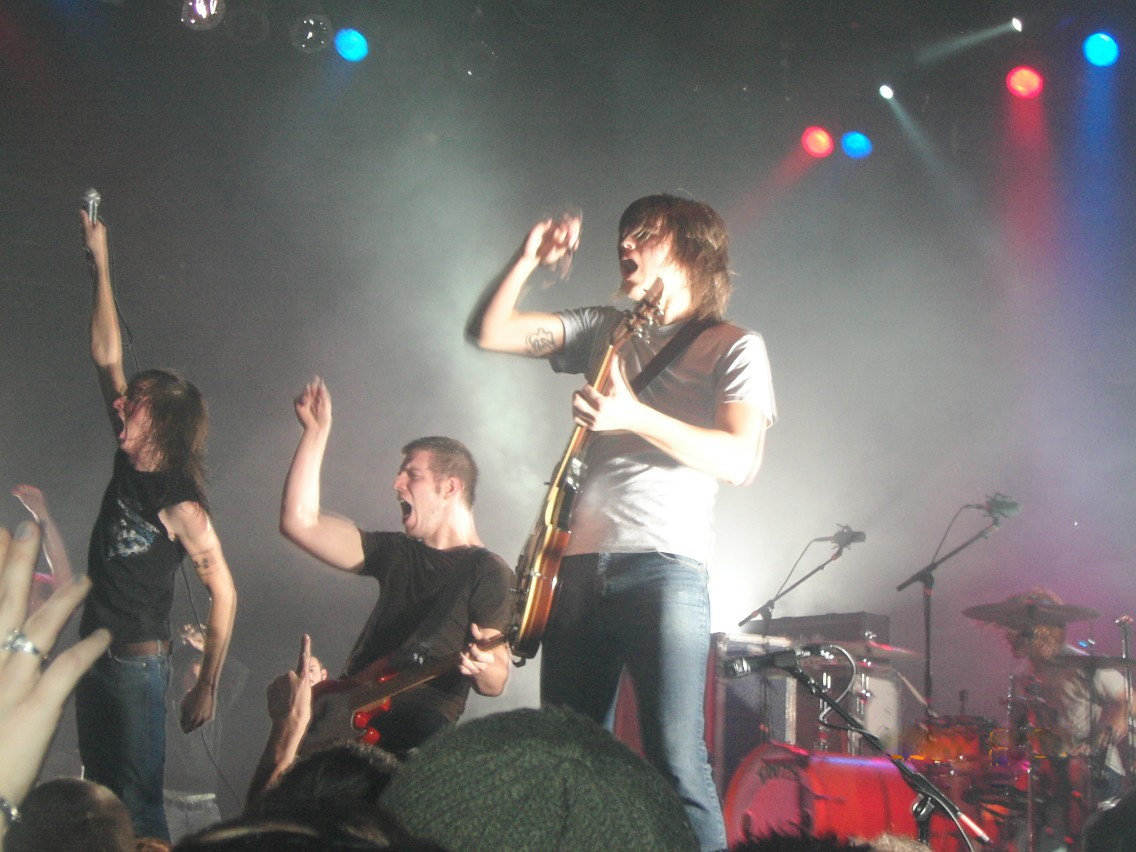
Underoath toured throughout 2004 and 2005 promoting the album.

In March and April 2004, Underoath toured the US as part of the Solid State Tour with labelmates Norma Jean and Beloved, among others, which was followed by a few shows with From First to Last. On April 21, 2004, They're Only Chasing Safety was announced for release in two months' time; alongside this, "Reinventing Your Exit" was posted on the band's Purevolume profile. The album was released on June 15, 2004, through Solid State. The artwork depicts Julie McCaddon, the wife of designer Kris McCaddon, wearing an oxygen mask. McCaddon, who had little budget to design the cover, hired his wife rather than a professional model for a photography session.

In June 2004, the band embarked on a US tour with Eighteen Visions, prior to appearance at that year's Hellfest and Warped Tour. During the Warped Tour, Underoath's audience grew and at one point matched the size of one of the tour's headliners, the Used. Underoath initially planned to support Senses Fail but had to pull out when Chamberlain married. Instead, they instigated their own Get Awesome Tour with Stretch Arm Strong and the Chariot. Following this, they supported Coheed and Cambria on their headlining US tour.

"Reinventing Your Exit" was released to radio on February 22, 2005; the music video for the song was filmed in Brooklyn, New York City. Underoath wanted to release "A Boy Brushed Red Living in Black and White", which they felt was more representative of the album's sound, but Solid State Records opted for something closer to The Changing of Times track "When the Sun Sleeps". On the radio edit of "Reinventing Your Exit", Chamberlain's vocals are lower in the mix and cut the breakdown.

In February and March 2005, Underoath performed on the East Coast dates of the first Taste of Chaos tour. They appeared at the South by Southwest music conference, prior to headlining the Total Badical Tour. The trek, which ran into May 2005, was supported by Fear Before the March of Flames, the Chariot, Hopesfall and These Arms Are Snakes. Towards the tour's conclusion, Underoath appeared at The Bamboozle and Cornerstone Festivals.

Following this, Underoath went on a tour of Europe that included a performance at Download Festival, and then appeared on Warped Tour in June and July 2005. On August 23, 2005, the music video for "It's Dangerous Business Walking Out Your Front Door" was posted on MTV's website. It was filmed in Hollywood with director Josh Graham, and depicts the band performing in a forest after having been involved in a car crash. The band played some US shows with Silverstein prior to a Canadian tour in September 2005 with the Used and Alexisonfire.

=== Reissues and full-album performances ===
On October 4, 2005, They're Only Chasing Safety was re-released through Tooth and Nail Records as a special edition that included four bonus tracks, a bonus DVD, and new artwork and packaging designed by Converge's Jacob Bannon. The band were planning to issue the DVD on its own until the label suggested combining it with They're Only Chasing Safety and selling it at the same price had the DVD been released separately. In October and November 2005, the group supported Thrice on their headlining US tour.

They're Only Chasing Safety was included in a three-CD set called Play Your Old Stuff: An Underoath Anthology (2011), alongside The Changing of Times and their fifth studio album Define the Great Line (2006). They're Only Chasing Safety was packaged with Define the Great Line as a two-LP set to promote the band's 2016 Rebirth Tour, during which they performed both albums in full. They're Only Chasing Safety was then included with Define the Great Line and their sixth studio album Lost in the Sound of Separation as part of the Underoath Observatory (2021) vinyl box set. To coincide with this, Underoath performed all three albums in their entireties as part of the Underoath: Observatory livestream series. "A Boy Brushed Red Living in Black and White", "Reinventing Your Exit", and "It's Dangerous Business Walking Out Your Front Door" were included on the band's second and third compilation albums Anthology: 1999–2013 (2012) and Icon (2014).

== Reception and legacy ==
Professional ratings
Review scores
Source	Rating
AllMusic	2.5/5 stars
Cross Rhythms	7/10 stars
Jesusfreakhideout	4.5/5 stars
Music Emissions	5/5 stars
Metal.de	7/10
Sputnikmusic	2.5/5

The album was met with generally favorable reviews from music critics. AllMusic's Alex Henderson said the band "do a decent job of integrating the honey and the vinegar" on the album, with Chamberlain having a "firm grasp of the sort of good cop/bad cop and heaven/hell contrasts that characterize a screamo disc" as this album. Andrew Segal of Cross Rhythms wrote that album had a "few good surprises which certainly make it merit more than just one listen", as its varied instrumental "largely set it melodically apart from a genre where people are often prone to detuning their instruments". Though he noticed some "moments that are a little 'samey'," it was overall a "well produced album that [...] shows more signs of intelligence than the genre is often credited with". The staff at HM Magazine saw it as a band evolving as they incorporate more melody, and "while it has ups and downs as a complete album, several songs approach greatness". Jesusfreakhideout staff writer Josh Taylor saw it as the band's most "accessible [release] to those not even interested in the genre", and while it was "not quite as heavy as previous ventures, [.. the album] is, hands down, one of the best releases of 2004".

Len Nash of The Phantom Tollbooth noted that the band had change styles to emo, which would serve as a "better position to compete against many mainstream artists". He added that despite the album be "'emotic' in nature, Underoath still jams out". Lollipop Magazine's Adrian Bromley saw it as "[g]eneric mediocre metalcore, for the most part, save for the techno/keyboard bits used on certain songs". musicOMH reviewer Vik Bansal also pointed out the musical shift to emo, and said the album "does little to raise the heartbeat or send frissons down the spine". He added that Chamberlain's vocals "sit at odds with the music", and proposed that if Chamberlain sung more, he would have compared Underoath to labelmates Dead Poetic. Sputnikmusic staff member Damrod wrote that while the "musical work is solid, it can not convince me completely. This is mainly because the sound is so similar to many other bands popular in the genre". Punk Planet's Scott Morrow wrote that apart from a "few legitimately decent moments", he struggled to sit through the album, citing the "trite and whiny singsong sound and can't-you-hear-the-pain-in-my-voice? screams". Fred Pilarczyk of mxdwn considered it a "safe album in all aspects, from the vocals, instrumentation, and production" with every song "follow[ing] a similar formula". Andrew Segal of Cross Rhythms complimented the album's production, and said the album "shows more signs of intelligence than the [nu-metal] genre is often credited with."

The album peaked at number 101 on the Billboard 200 and number seven on the Christian Albums charts. As of 2005, the album sold more than 218,000 copies, with the re-release selling an additional 279,000 copies, making a combined sales of more than 500,000 copies in the US alone. The reissue topped the Billboard Heatseekers Albums chart. It was certified gold by the Recording Industry Association of America in December 2011.

In 2005, the album was nominated for a Dove Award for Rock Album of the Year at the 36th GMA Dove Awards. Alternative Press ranked "Reinventing Your Exit" at number 40 on their list of the best 100 singles from the 2000s.

In 2024, Andrew Sacher of BrooklynVegan named the album as one of the best emo albums of 2004, saying: "A lot of bands mixed metalcore and pop-emo in the early/mid 2000s, but few did it better than Underoath did on They’re Only Chasing Safety. [...] if you weren’t looking closely, they might’ve seemed interchangeable with the countless other similar bands of that era. But Underoath had a lot more depth to them than a lot of the bands they were often grouped with–which became even clearer on subsequent albums like Define the Great Line–and that’s evident on They’re Only Chasing Safety too."

== Track listing ==
All music by Underoath. All lyrics written by Aaron Gillespie and Spencer Chamberlain, except where noted.

Standard edition track listing
No.	Title	Lyrics	Length
1.	"Young and Aspiring"		3:04
2.	"A Boy Brushed Red Living in Black and White"	Gillespie; Chamberlain; Timothy McTague	4:28
3.	"The Impact of Reason"		3:23
4.	"Reinventing Your Exit"		4:22
5.	"The Blue Note" (instrumental)		0:51
6.	"It's Dangerous Business Walking Out Your Front Door"		3:58
7.	"Down, Set, Go"		3:44
8.	"I Don't Feel Very Receptive Today"		3:42
9.	"I'm Content with Losing"		3:55
10.	"Some Will Seek Forgiveness, Others Escape"	Gillespie; Chamberlain; Aaron Marsh	4:21
Total length:			35:50

Special edition bonus tracks
No.	Title	Length
11.	"I've Got Ten Friends and a Crowbar That Says You Ain't Gonna Do Jack" (also included on the vinyl and Japanese versions)	5:06
12.	"The 80's Song"	3:59
13.	"You're So Intricate"	3:54
14.	"Smic Tague" (instrumental)	3:29
Total length:		52:18

== Personnel ==
Personnel per booklet.

Underoath

- Spencer Chamberlain – lead vocals
- Timothy McTague – lead guitar
- James Smith – rhythm guitar
- Grant Brandell – bass guitar
- Christopher Dudley – keyboards, synthesizers, samplers, programming
- Aaron Gillespie – drums, clean vocals

Additional musicians

- Aaron Marsh – additional vocals (track 10)

Production and design

- James Paul Wisner – producer, engineer
- Matt Goldman – additional vocals recording, programming recording
- J.R. McNeely – mixing
- Troy Glessner – mastering
- Kris McCaddon – A.D. photography, design
- David Stuart – band photography

== Charts and certifications ==
=== Weekly charts ===
Chart performance for They're Only Chasing Safety
Chart (2004–2005)	Peak position
US Billboard 200	101
US Top Christian Albums (Billboard)	7
US Heatseekers Albums (Billboard)	1

=== Certifications ===
Certifications for They're Only Chasing Safety
Region	Certification	Certified units/sales
United States (RIAA)	Gold	500,000^{^}
^{^} Shipments figures based on certification alone.
