= Lost in the Sound of Separation =

Studio album by Underoath
- Released: September 2, 2008
- Recorded: March–April 2008
- Studios: Glow in the Dark, Atlanta, Georgia
- Genres: Metalcore; post-hardcore; screamo
- Length: 41:43
- Labels: Solid State, Tooth & Nail
- Producers: Adam Dutkiewicz; Matt Goldman; Underoath

Underoath chronology
Survive, Kaleidoscope (2008)	Lost in the Sound of Separation (2008)	Ø (Disambiguation) (2010)

Singles from Lost in the Sound of Separation
- 1. "Desperate Times Desperate Measures" Released: September 16, 2008; 2. "Too Bright to See Too Loud to Hear" Released: June 2, 2009

Lost in the Sound of Separation is the sixth studio album by American rock band Underoath. It was released on September 2, 2008, through Solid State and Tooth & Nail Records. Following the release of their fifth studio album Define the Great Line (2006), relationships between members became strained to the point they almost broke up. They decided to go on a hiatus; Lost in the Sound of Separation was recorded at Glow in the Dark Studios in Atlanta, Georgia in March and April 2008. The band produced the album with Adam Dutkiewicz and Matt Goldman, both of whom worked on Define the Great Line. The album has been described as metalcore, post-hardcore and screamo, with elements of industrial, recalling the works of Refused, At the Drive-In, and Cult of Luna.

Underoath headlined one stage at the inaugural Mayhem Festival prior to the release of the "Desperate Times Desperate Measures" at the end of August 2008. The song was released to radio on September 16, 2008; around this time, the band toured across parts of Europe, South Africa, Australia. They then embarked on a headlining tour of the United States, and closed out the year with shows in South and Central America. To open 2009, they went on a co-headlining Canadian tour with Norma Jean, before touring Europe as part of the Give it a Name festival. The music video for "Too Bright to See Too Loud to Hear" appeared on the band's Myspace profile in April 2009; it was released to radio on June 2, 2009. Underoath spent the next three months touring as part of the Warped Tour. The song Desperate Times, Desperate Measures was released as a downloadable song in the music/rhythm game Rock Band 2.

Lost in the Sound of Separation received favorable reviews from music critics, some of whom saw it as more experimental than the band's previous works, while others regarded it as a refinement of Define the Great Line. The album reached number eight on the Billboard 200 chart, selling around 56,000 copies in its first week of release. Alongside this, it topped the Top Christian Albums chart, and peaked at number 15 in Canada. It was nominated for a Grammy Award for Best Boxed or Special Limited Edition Package, and a Dove Award for Recorded Music Packaging of the Year.

== Background and recording ==
Underoath released their fifth studio album Define the Great Line in June 2006. It had sold almost 100,000 copies in its first week, and had been certified gold at the end of the year. Alongside this, it peaked at number two on the Billboard 200, becoming the highest-charting Christian release to do so since 1997. A month after that album's release, the band started writing new material for its follow-up. Drummer Aaron Gillespie spent some time with his other band the Almost, who released their debut album Southern Weather in April 2007. It reached the top 40 on the Billboard 200, while its lead single "Say This Sooner" peaked at number seven on the Modern Rock chart. During the promotional cycle for Define the Great Line, the band dropped off the Warped Tour; around this time, vocalist Spencer Chamberlain was struggling with substance abuse.

Interpersonal relations between the members had reached a point where they were closing to breaking up. They opted to go on hiatus to focus on their respective families; fans were concerned that Gillespie would leave the band due to the success of the Almost. Lost in the Sound of Separation was recorded over six weeks in March and April 2008 at Glow in the Dark Studios in Atlanta, Georgia. Fans could watch the recording process through the live streaming platform Stickam. As the band enjoyed working with Adam Dutkiewicz and Matt Goldman on their last album, they decided to re-enlist them to produce their new one. The pair and the band served as producers, all of whom were assisted by Jimmie Myers. A webcam was set up to allow fans to watch the band throughout the sessions. In addition to this, the members chatted to various fans when they had nothing to do, and held an interview via this method. David Bendeth mixed the recordings at The House of Loud in Elmwood Park, New Jersey over two weeks in May 2008, while Ted Jensen mastered the album at Sterling Sound in New York City.

== Composition and lyrics ==
=== Overview ===
Musically, the sound of Lost in the Sound of Separation has been described as metalcore, post-hardcore, and screamo, with elements of industrial and post-metal. It drew comparison to the works of Refused and Relationship of Command-era (2000) At the Drive-In, while its softer moments channelled Cult of Luna. Some reviewers saw the album as more experimental than their past work, while others saw it as refining the sound of Define the Great Line. The album's title is taken from a lyric in "We Are the Involuntary". According to Chamberlain, the name deals with people telling others what they can and cannot do, "[i]t's the concept of being lost in that noise and trying to separate it all out to make sense of what is going on with your life". The lyrics tackle more personal subjects, such as struggles between band members and their near-break up.

Gillespie's vocals were restricted in order to favour Chamberlain's, adding to aid certain songs, as in "The Only Survivor Was Miraculously Unharmed". Gillespie attributed this to the band writing music first and the vocals secondary, "and this music didn't really fit the whole clean vocal thing". Guitarist Timothy McTague's parts and keyboardist Christopher Dudley's parts recalled portions of The Alchemy Index (2007) by Thrice. Gillespie played his drums from an older rock perspective, as he felt as if "every two or three years, new trends happen in drumming, like certain fills that you hear", and wanted to avoid that. For example, he used 16-inch and 18-inch floor toms, combined with a 24-inch kick drum, to achieve a sound akin to 1970s-esque classic rock. Leah Helfen played cello on "Desolate Earth :: The End Is Here"; she was suggested by a friend of Goldman's.

=== Songs ===
In the up-tempo opening song "Breathing in a New Mentality", Chamberlain alludes to his drug use. It opens with a roughly mixed intro, giving over to a Southern metalcore guitar riff in the style of Maylene and the Sons of Disaster, ending with a Hopesfall-esque bridge section. Guitarist Timothy McTague said with the intro, they wanted listeners to have a "first impression like, 'Man they must've cut a lot of corners' [...] and then it kicks in and your entire car, blows up. We wanted to come out, blow them away". Dudley said it was the fastest song the band had written, done in one practice session at a storage unit. "Anyone Can Dig a Hole But It Takes a Real Man to Call It Home" is akin to the material on Define the Great Line; both it and the opener feature progressive metalcore sections.

"A Fault Line, A Fault of Mine" is a mid-tempo track with a post-rock interlude. The industrial-leaning "Emergency Broadcast :: The End Is Near" evokes the sound of Nine Inch Nails, before shifting into ambient metal, and ends with a crescendo echoing the work of Isis. It was initially called "Elephant's Stampede", and was influenced by the band listening to the self-titled album (1969) from Led Zeppelin while driving. "The Only Survivor Was Miraculously Unharmed" is reminiscent of the band's earlier metalcore material, before shifting into Chamberlain and Gillespie singing in unison and ending abruptly. The programming and gang vocals near its conclusion recalled The Always Open Mouth-era (2006) Fear Before the March of Flames.

"The Only Survivor Was Miraculously Unharmed" segues into "We Are the Involuntary", which explores post-hardcore and screamo. The latter, along with "The Created Void", serve as a middle point between the work of Meshuggah and Thrice. "Desperate Times Desperate Measures" features Daniel Davison on additional drums, and was compared to the work of Saosin. It talks about seeking people for help; it tells the story of a man locked in a cellar who tries to scream for help, but others are unable to hear him as they are upstairs.

"Too Bright to See Too Loud to Hear" starts off sparsely with Gillespie soft voice and a keyboard line from Dudley. It eventually builds with Chamberlain's voice (which recalled Scary Kids Scaring Kids frontman Cove Reber) and handclaps, leading into bridge of gang vocals repeating the line "Good God, can you still get us home". Jeremy Griffith and John Duke aided in the group vocals; Chamberlain interrupts this moment screaming "How can we get home?" Its ending reverb effects transition into the album's closing track, "Desolate Earth :: The End Is Here", the atmosphere of which is set by Dudley's piano part and trip hop beats, accompanied by strings. The track nearly ended up as an instrumental piece until Chamberlain later added lyrics that dealt with an apocalyptic, end-of-the-world scenario. Dudley's parts were inspired by him listening to John Murphy's works, namely the scores for 28 Days Later (2002) and Sunshine (2007).

== Release and promotion ==
On April 30, 2008, Underoath's next album was announced for release in five months' time. On June 12, its name was revealed as Lost in the Sound of Separation. "Desperate Times Desperate Measures" was posted on the band's Myspace profile on July 23, 2008; the week before, a music video was filmed for the song in Los Angeles, California with directoring studio Walter Robot. The band used Popcore Film for all of their videos for the last album and decided to seek someone else. They landed on Walter Robot, who suggested an idea with animation, stop motion, a creature and a young boy; the band greenlit it immediately. They played a few headlining shows with P.O.S. and Ill Patriot in July 2008, before headlined the Hot Topic stage at the inaugural Mayhem Festival until August 2008. In between shows on the trek, Underoath played headlining shows with the Red Chord.

Two weeks before the release of the album, Underoath announced that a very limited quantity of "golden passes" were packaged with select copies of Lost in the Sound of Separation. The winner of a golden pass is allowed into any Underoath concert for the rest of their formation. Music news websiteAbsolutePunk were also running a contest in conjunction with Tooth & Nail, giving members of AbsolutePunk the opportunity to win an Underoath prize pack. On August 18, 2008, the album's artwork and track listing were revealed. On August 29, the music video for "Desperate Times Desperate Measures" was posted online and the album was made available for streaming on their Myspace profile. The "Desperate Times Desperate Measures" video premiered on TV through MTV2 the following day. Preceded by a one-off show in Mexico, a release show was held at Irving Plaza in New York City with the Red Chord and the Number Twelve Looks Like You.

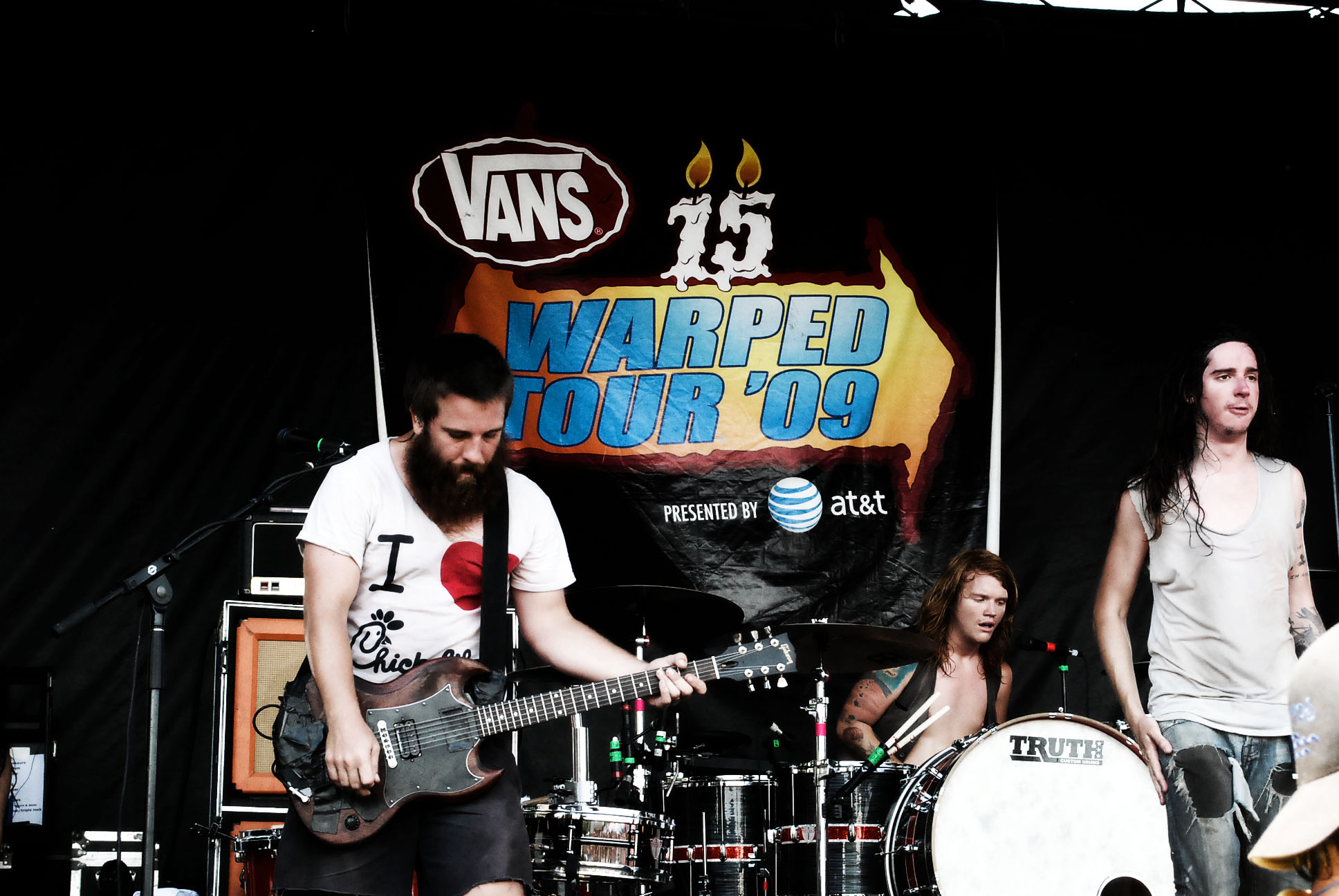
Underoath toured throughout 2008 and 2009 for Lost in the Sound of Separation.

Lost in the Sound of Separation was made available for streaming on August 30, 2008, before being released on September 2, 2008, through Tooth & Nail and Solid State Records. In addition to the standard version Lost in the Sound of Separation, two other editions were made available: a special edition, and a deluxe edition. The special edition comes with a bonus DVD detailing the making of the album, produced by The Audible Diversion Group and was filmed and edited by McTague and filmmaker Ryan E. Gardner. A limited, deluxe box set edition contains two 10" "saw-blade" die cut vinyl records and a 56-page book in addition to the CD and DVD. Listening parties were held at branches of Hot Topic stores.

"Desperate Times Desperate Measures" was released to active rock radio stations on September 16, 2008. In September and October 2008, the band went on a UK tour with Envy on the Coast and Oh, Sleeper, played some shows in Germany and Italy, before playing shows in South Africa and Australia. Following this, Underoath went on a headlining tour of the US with support from Saosin and the Devil Wears Prada. Alongside these, P.O.S. appeared on the first two weeks, Person L on second two weeks, and the Famine on the final two weeks. They closed out the year with stint in South and Central America. In March 2009, the band went on a co-headlining tour of Canada with Norma Jean; they were supported by Innerpartysystem.

In April 2009, the band toured Europe as part of the Give it a Name festival, and played Groezrock in Belgium soon after. The music video for "Too Bright to See Too Loud to Hear" was premiered on Myspace on April 22, 2009; the band worked with Popcore Films, who made it in a steampunk aesthetic. It was the winning video created by a contestant in a contest exclusive to the United Kingdom. The song was released to radio on June 2. Between late June and late August, the band performed on the Warped Tour. On July 30, 2009, the band played "Desperate Times Desperate Measures" and "Too Bright to See Too Loud to Hear" on Fuel TV. Following this, they then played a one-off show to help celebrate the 15th anniversary of Warped Tour.

Lost in the Sound of Separation was included with their four studio album They're Only Chasing Safety (2004) and Define the Great Line as part of the Underoath Observatory (2021) vinyl box set. Coinciding this, Underoath performed all three albums in their entireties as part of the Underoath: Observatory livestream series. "Desperate Times Desperate Measures" and "Too Bright to See Too Loud to Hear" were included on the band's second compilation album Anthology: 1999–2013 (2012), while "Too Bright to See Too Loud to Hear", "Emergency Broadcast :: The End Is Near", and "We Are the Involuntary" were included on their third compilation album Icon (2014).

== Reception ==
Professional ratings
Aggregate scores
Source	Rating
Metacritic	92/100
Review scores
Source	Rating
About.com	4.5/5 stars
AbsolutePunk	95%
AllMusic	4/5 stars
Alternative Press	5/5 stars
Artistdirect	4/5 stars
Cross Rhythms	9/10 stars
IGN	8.3/10
Jesusfreakhideout	4.5/5 stars
Sputnikmusic	4/5
USA Today	3/4 stars

Lost in the Sound of Separation was met with universal acclaim from music critics. At Metacritic, which assigns a normalized rating out of 100 to reviews from mainstream publications, the album received an average score of 92, based on four reviews.

About.com contributor Ray Van Horn, Jr. said the album "couldn't be more distinct and transitionally estranged" from the works of the band's contemporaries. He explained that it "literally propels itself from song-to-song, each possessing the fireball puissance of the band's famed live prowess". AbsolutePunk staff member Drew Beringer said it covered "a wide scope of vibes, paces, and directions," as the listener would be "shaken by the monstrous growls from Chamberlain and stunned by the bombastic drumming" from Gillespie. AllMusic reviewer James Christopher Monger wrote that aside from the opening two songs, the album manages to "not only signal growth for the Florida ensemble, but deliver on the dark promises that haunted Define the Great Line".

Scott Heisel of Alternative Press said Chamberlain's lyricism was "brutally honest and at times uncomfortable", something that continued from Define the Great Line. He called the album "2008's first perfect record," as the band "have elevated themselves to a level of their own". Cross Rhythms' Tony Cummings echoed a similar statement, saying the band's "songwriting contains both a new spiritual militancy and some unexpected dalliances with calming melody in between the ear-splitting riffs" and the big-sounding drums. IGN writer Ed Thompson referred to it as "one of those albums that is filled with songs that can stand independently, but when taken as a collective unit, are just that much better".

Jesusfreakhideout staff member Scott Fryberger said it was "still the borderline chaotic, screamy, crunchy, and sometimes brutal Underoath" that the band have released before, "just with a tiny hint of some industrial thrown in". Sputnikmusic staff member John Hanson, on the other hand, said it brought a "tighter sense of songwriting and more experimentalism with their sound and song structure", though subdued the heavier aspects. USA Today writer Brian Mansfield said Chamberlain's "self-flagellating screams make some of Separation as enjoyable as battling addiction," as Gillespie's "melodies break through like distant daylight, offering possible hope and redemption". Evan Lucy of Billboard said the band "has made definitive strides at progression without abandoning the muscular, broad-shouldered hardcore that made it a household name".

In its first week, Lost in the Sound of Separation debuted at number eight on the Billboard 200 chart, selling around 56,000 copies; 9,476 of the total were exclusively from digital downloads. It topped the Top Christian Albums chart. It peaked at number 15 in Canada. In 2010, the deluxe edition was nominated for a Dove Award for Recorded Music Packaging of the Year at the 41st GMA Dove Awards. The song "Too Bright to See" was also nominated for Short Form Music Video of the Year. The album was nominated for Best Boxed or Special Limited Edition Package at the 2010 Grammy Awards. Rock Sound ranked it at number 32 on their list of the year's best albums. The album served as an influence on Josh Manuel of Issues.

== Track listing ==
All lyrics by Spencer Chamberlain and Aaron Gillespie. All music by Underoath.

Lost in the Sound of Separation track listing
No.	Title	Length
1.	"Breathing in a New Mentality"	2:37
2.	"Anyone Can Dig a Hole But It Takes a Real Man to Call It Home"	3:16
3.	"A Fault Line, a Fault of Mine"	3:22
4.	"Emergency Broadcast :: The End Is Near"	5:44
5.	"The Only Survivor Was Miraculously Unharmed"	3:09
6.	"We Are the Involuntary"	4:10
7.	"The Created Void"	4:02
8.	"Coming Down Is Calming Down"	3:15
9.	"Desperate Times Desperate Measures"	3:28
10.	"Too Bright to See Too Loud to Hear"	4:31
11.	"Desolate Earth :: The End Is Here"	4:07
Total length:		41:43

== Personnel ==
Personnel per booklet.

Underoath

- Spencer Chamberlain – lead vocals
- Timothy McTague – lead guitar
- James Smith – rhythm guitar
- Grant Brandell – bass guitar
- Christopher Dudley – keyboards, synthesizers, samplers
- Aaron Gillespie – drums, clean vocals

Additional musicians

- Leah Helfen – cello (track 11)
- Jeremy Griffith – group vocals (track 10)
- John Duke – group vocals (track 10)
- Daniel Davison – additional drums (track 9)

Production and design

- Adam Dutkiewicz – producer
- Matt Goldman – producer
- Underoath – producer
- Jimmie Myers – assistant
- David Bendeth – mixing
- Ted Jensen – mastering
- Nathan Warshowski – drum technician
- Jordan Butcher – art direction, design
- Drew Beckmeyer – illustrations

== Charts ==
Chart performance for Lost in the Sound of Separation
Chart (2008)	Peak position
Australian Albums (ARIA)	36
Canadian Albums (Billboard)	15
UK Albums (Official Charts)	169
UK Rock & Metal Albums (Official Charts)	20
US Billboard 200	8
US Top Christian Albums (Billboard)	1
US Top Rock Albums (Billboard)	3
