= The Changing of Times =

Studio album by Underoath
- Released: February 26, 2002
- Recorded: 2001
- Studios: Wisner Productions, Davie, Florida; Landmark Productions & Recording Studios, Fort Lauderdale, Florida
- Genres: Screamo; metalcore; indie rock; emo
- Length: 35:45
- Label: Solid State
- Producer: James Paul Wisner

Underoath chronology
Cries of the Past (2000)	The Changing of Times (2002)	They're Only Chasing Safety (2004)

Professional ratings
Review scores
Source	Rating
AllMusic	3/5 stars
Alternative Press	2.5/5 stars
Cross Rhythms	8/10 stars
Exclaim!	mildly favorable
Jesus Freak Hideout	5/5 stars
The Phantom Tollbooth	Review 1: highly favorable Review 2:

The Changing of Times is the third studio album by American rock band Underoath. The album was released on February 26, 2002, through Solid State Records. It is the first album to include guitarist Timothy McTague and bassist William Nottke, the latter leaving the band afterwards along with vocalist Dallas Taylor and guitarist Octavio Fernandez. The album is the best-selling Solid State debut.

== Music ==
The album is significant for introducing the post-hardcore elements that would subsequently become central to Underoath’s sound, including a greater emphasis on melodic hooks and structured choruses. While certain tracks preserve aspects of the raw metalcore style characteristic of the band’s previous albums, The Changing of Times represents a marked shift in overall musical direction. It is also the first Underoath release to feature clean vocal contributions from drummer Gillespie. Alternative Press considers it a "scene album".

== Track listing ==
All songs written and performed by Underoath.

No.	Title	Length
1.	"When the Sun Sleeps"	5:33
2.	"Letting Go of Tonight"	1:52
3.	"A Message for Adrienne"	4:37
4.	"Never Meant to Break Your Heart"	3:55
5.	"The Changing of Times"	4:08
6.	"Angel Below"	3:23
7.	"The Best of Me"	3:33
8.	"Short of Daybreak"	2:43
9.	"Alone in December"	5:11
10.	"814 Stops Today" (instrumental)	0:49
Total length:		35:45

== Personnel ==
Underoath

- Dallas Taylor – lead vocals
- Octavio Fernandez – rhythm guitar
- Tim McTague – lead guitar
- William Nottke – bass guitar
- Chris Dudley – keyboards, synthesizers, samplers
- Aaron Gillespie – drums, clean vocals

Production

- James Paul Wisner – producer, mixer, additional bass, guitar and string arrangements
- Alan Douches – mastering at West Side Studios
- Dean Dydek – assistant engineer
- Mark Portnoy – drum recording at Landmark Productions & Recording Studios
- Earl Gillespie – photography
- TheHaloFarm – album design
