= Finished People =

Studio album by Sleeping Giant
- Released: August 19, 2014
- Recorded: January – March 2014
- Genre: Metalcore
- Length: 36:15
- Label: Century Media
- Producer: Andrew P. Glover

Sleeping Giant chronology
Kingdom Days in an Evil Age (2011)	Finished People (2014)	I Am (2018)

Professional ratings
Review scores
Source	Rating
Jesus Freak Hideout	4/5 stars 4.5/5 stars
Indie Vision Music	4/5 stars
Mind Equals Blown	7.5/10 stars

Finished People is the fourth album of the Christian metalcore band, Sleeping Giant.

== Critical reception ==
Wayne Reimer of Jesus Freak Hideout writes: "If you weren't a fan of Sleeping Giant before, Finished People might change your mind." Brody B. of Indie Vision Music writes: "Sleeping Giant have not pushed the envelope of the hardcore world by any means with “Finished People” and yet the Salt Lake City based band produce a monster of a hardcore record with enough heart to make up for what it lacks in musical complexity. “Finished People” capitalizes on congregational hardcore worship anthems and challenges listeners everywhere to boldly love and spread the message of Jesus." Tim Dodderidge of Mind Equals Blown writes: "It’s amazing how much Sleeping Giant has grown since their rough debut, and it’s even more amazing to look at the entire scope of their career and realize there’s still some potential left to unlock. Arguably the biggest complaint aside from the lack of screams is that the album’s riffage and melodicism could’ve been a bit more diverse. Despite some unique elements here and there, some tracks run together and a select few stand more stout than others. But the music is of higher quality on these guys’ newest work than any of their others, and it showcases a band tapping into their deepest, most inspired passion, tenacity, and honesty in a genre where those traits are extremely important. Sleeping Giant continually is a breath of fresh air thanks to their intensely passionate God-breathed metal tunes, and Finished People is prime evidence of this."

== Track listing ==
No.	Title	Length
1.	"Clutches"	3:32
2.	"Overthrow" (feat: Brook Reeves of Impending Doom)	2:45
3.	"Finished People" (feat: Joe Musten of Beloved and Advent and Nate Rebolledo of Xibalba)	3:05
4.	"Death Knell" (feat: Bruce Lepage formerly of 100 Demons)	3:13
5.	"Son Of God, Son Of Man"	3:44
6.	"Christus Victor"	2:47
7.	"Violence" (feat: Levi the Poet)	3:03
8.	"Brother's Keeper (The Easter Rising)"	2:39
9.	"The Great Divorce" (feat: Drew Dijorio of Stray from the Path)	3:14
10.	"Blood Meridian" (feat: Joel Muniz of Dynasty)	3:07
11.	"Victory"	5:05
Total length:		36:15

== Credits ==
Sleeping Giant

- Tom Green - Vocals
- Geoff Brouillette - Guitar, bass
- Matt Weir - Drums

Additional Musicians

- Drew Di Jorio - Guest Vocals on track 9
- Bruce Lepage - Guest Vocals on track 4
- Levi the Poet - Guest Vocals on track 7
- Joel Muniz - Guest Vocals on track 10
- Joe Musten - Guest Vocals on track 3
- Nate Rebolledo - Guest Vocals on track 3
- Brook Reeves - Guest Vocals on track 2

Personnel

- William Putney - Mastering
- Orie McGinness - Artwork
- Andrew P. Glover - Engineer, Mixing, Producer
- Justin Bernardez - Assistant Engineer, Mixing
