= Joe Musten =

American musician (born 1983)

- Born: Joseph Stephen Musten; 1983 (age 42–43)
- Origin: Kernersville, North Carolina
- Genres: Christian metal, metalcore, Christian hardcore, hardcore punk, post-grunge, indie rock, Christian rock, post-hardcore
- Occupation: Musician
- Instruments: drums, vocals
- Years active: 1996–present

Joseph Stephen Musten is an American musician who started his musical career in 1999. He formed Beloved, Advent, Your Son Is Dead, and Torn. In 2008, he joined the band The Almost after former drummer Kenny Bozich quit the band. Joe was featured in the December 2009 issue of DRUM Magazine alongside former bandmate Aaron Gillespie. He formed the band, Torn, and was featured on the self-titled debut album, but was un-credited.

== Personal life ==
He is cousins with his bandmate, Dusty Redmon. Musten is married and has twins.

== Bands ==
Current

- Advent - vocals (2004–2011, 2016–present)
- Beloved - drums, vocals (1999–2004, 2019-present)
- Ends of Sanity - drums (2021-present)

Former

- The Almost - drums (2008–2015)
- Public Rage - drums (1996-1999)
- Torn - vocals (2014–2015)
- Your Son Is Dead - drums (2012–2014)

== Discography ==
Beloved

- Garage Demos (1999; Independent)
- ...And So It Goes (2000; Independent)
- The Running Pre-Release Sampler (2001; Independent)
- The Running (2001; Vindicated)
- One Night Split (w/Luti-Kriss) (2002; Independent)
- Failure On (2003; Solid State)
- The Running (2004 reissue; Solid State)
- Beloved Live at Cat's Cradle (Live Album) – 2004
- Kiss It Goodbye: The Final Show (2005 DVD; Solid State)

Advent

- Remove the Earth (2008; Solid State)
- Naked and Cold (2009; Solid State)
- Pain and Suffering (2016; Bridge 9)
- God Is The End (2025; Advent Records)

The Almost

- No Gift to Bring (2008; T&N)
- Monster EP (2009; T&N)
- Monster Monster (2009; T&N)
- Fear Inside Our Bones (2013; T&N)

Your Son Is Dead

- The Silver Cord EP (2012; Independent)

Torn

- Torn (2014; Harm Reduction)

=== Guest appearances ===
- "Across the Aisle" by Call To Preserve, on their album Life of Defiance (2010)
- "Nietzsche's Madness" by Living Sacrifice, on their album The Infinite Order (2010)
- "Finished People (Feat. Nate Rebolledo of Xibalba)" by Sleeping Giant, on their album Finished People (2014)
- "Casket Minds" by Dwell, on their EP Dwell (2014)
- "Immanuel (The Challenger)" & "Immanuel (The Redeemer)" by For Today, on their album Portraits (2009)
- "Scarlet Paint and Gasoline" by Glass Casket, on their album We Are Gathered Here Today (2004)
- "Sacrifice" by The Great Commission, on their album Cast the First Stone (2013)
- "In Absentia" by Reign Supreme, on their album, Testing the Limit of Infinite (2009)
- "Remember Me" by Poured Out, on the album, To the Point of Death (2016)
- "Celestial" by HolyName, on their album, HolyName (2023)
