= Life of Defiance =

Studio album by Call to Preserve
- Released: June 8, 2010
- Recorded: March, 2010
- Genre: Christian hardcore, crossover thrash, metalcore
- Length: 30:32
- Label: Facedown

Call to Preserve chronology
From Isolation (2008)	Life of Defiance (2010)	Validation EP (2011)

Life of Defiance is the third and final studio album from Call to Preserve. Facedown Records released the album on June 8, 2010.

== Critical reception ==
Professional ratings
Review scores
Source	Rating
Cross Rhythms	8/10 squares
HM Magazine	4/5 stars
Indie Vision Music	4/5 stars
Jesus Freak Hideout	2.5/5 stars

Awarding the album four stars from HM Magazine, Rob Shameless states, "Call to Preserve puts out better records with each release, and Life of Defiance is no exception." Peter John Willoughby, rating the album an eight out of ten for Cross Rhythms, writes, "The only drawback is the relatively short length (less than 31 minutes) of this classic hardcore punk album." Giving the album two and a half stars at Jesus Freak Hideout, Wayne Reimer describes, "it lacks in a lot of areas, particularly creativity." Steve, awarding the album four stars by Indie Vision Music, says, "Call to Preserver has managed to craft good hardcore across an entire album rather than just a few songs on the album."

== Track listing ==
No.	Title	Length
1.	"Life of Defiance"	2:19
2.	"Drawing Lines on All Sides"	2:05
3.	"Empty Promises"	2:14
4.	"The Weight"	2:32
5.	"Functionary"	3:04
6.	"Desoto"	3:21
7.	"Thin Skin"	3:17
8.	"Across the Isle" (Feat Joe Musten of The Almost, Advent, and Beloved)	1:34
9.	"Holding Embers"	3:23
10.	"Lost at Sea"	1:33
11.	"Last Look Back"	5:10
Total length:		30:32
