= Season (disambiguation) =

A season is one of the major divisions of the year.

Season(s) or The Season may also refer to:

== Periods of the year ==
- Season (society) or social season, the portion of the year when the social elite hold events
- Season (sports), the portion of the year when games are played
- Breeding season, a time of year most favorable for wild animal or bird breeding
  - Estrus, a period in the estrous cycle of mammals when female seasonal breeders are receptive to mating
- Christmas and holiday season, an annual festive season surrounding Christmas and New Year's Day
- Growing season, in agriculture, the period of the year when crops can be grown
- Hunting season, times of year when it is legal to hunt specific types of animals
- Liturgical season, in Christian churches, a portion of the liturgical year
- Seasonal food, the time of year when a given type food is at its peak

== Places ==
- Seasons, a house in Round Maple, Suffolk, England

== Arts, entertainment, and media ==
=== Films ===
- Season (film), a 1989 Malayalam feature film
- Seasons (2015 film), a French film
- Seasons (2023 film), a Filipino romantic drama film
- Seasons (2027 film), an American supernatural horror film
- Seasons, an Omnimax film produced by the Science Museum of Minnesota
- The Season, a sports documentary about a high school football team coached by Mike Pettine

=== Literature ===
- The Season: A Candid Look at Broadway, a 1969 book by William Goldman
- The Season (Garner book), a 2024 book by Helen Garner
- The Season, a 2009 young-adult novel by Sarah MacLean

=== Music ===
==== Albums ====
- Seasons (Alan Silva album), 1971
- Seasons (Bing Crosby album) or the title song, 1977
- Seasons (David Murray album) or the title song, 1999
- Seasons (Esprit D'Air album), 2024
- Seasons (Levi the Poet album), 2012
- Seasons (The Oak Ridge Boys album) or the title song, 1986
- Seasons (Pete Jolly album) or the title song, 1970
- Seasons (Sevendust album) or the title song, 2003
- Seasons (Sylar album) or the title song, 2018
- Seasons (The Verses album), 2010
- Seasons (EP) or the title song, by Tiger Please, 2010
- Seasons, by Chris August, 2018
- Seasons, by CoH, 2002
- Seasons, by Magna Carta, 1970
- The Season (Steve Perry album), 2021
- The Season, by Jane Monheit, 2005

==== Songs ====
- "Seasons" (Ayumi Hamasaki song), 2000
- "Seasons" (Jin Akanishi song), 2011
- "Seasons" (Olly Murs song), 2015
- "Seasons" (The Veer Union song), 2009
- "Seasons" (Thirty Seconds to Mars song), 2023
- "Seasons (Waiting on You)", by Future Islands, 2014
- "Seasons" (The Snuts song), 2018, debut single
- "Seasons", by 6lack from East Atlanta Love Letter, 2018
- "Seasons", by Bebe Rexha from Bebe, 2023
- "Seasons", by Chris Cornell from Singles: Original Motion Picture Soundtrack, 1992
- "Seasons", by Chuck Salamone from Absent Moon, A Hylics Song Cycle, 2023
- "Seasons", by CunninLynguists from SouthernUnderground, 2003
- "Seasons", by DragonForce from The Power Within, 2012
- "Seasons", by Grace Slick from Dreams, 1980
- "Seasons", by Maroon 5 from Jordi, 2021
- "Seasons", by Morning Again from As Tradition Dies Slowly, 1998
- "Seasons", by Mozzy, Sjava and Reason from the Black Panther soundtrack, 2018
- "Seasons", by T.I. from Dime Trap, 2018

=== Television ===
- Season (North America) or series (UK), a cycle or set of episodes of a television show
- Justin Bieber: Seasons, a 2020 American documentary series

=== Video games ===
- Season (video gaming), a definite set of special content in a video game
- Season: A Letter to the Future, a 2023 video game
- The Sims 2: Seasons, a 2007 expansion pack to the computer game The Sims 2
- The Sims 3: Seasons, a 2012 expansion pack to the computer game The Sims 3
- The Sims 4: Seasons, a 2018 expansion pack to the computer game The Sims 4

== Other uses ==
- Silly season, a period typified by the emergence of frivolous news stories in the media
- Season ticket, informally abbreviated "season"
- Two Strangers (Carry a Cake Across New York), a British musical formerly titled The Season
- The Hunting Season, a period during the British Mandate over Palestine
- Afghanistan fighting season, an annual period with advantageous conditions for warfare in Afghanistan

== See also ==
- Seasoning (disambiguation)
- The Four Seasons (disambiguation)
- The Seasons (disambiguation)
- "SZNS", a song by Dinah Jane
- SZNZ, a series of EPs by Weezer
