= The Seasons =

The Seasons may refer to:

== Literature and mythology ==
- Horae or the Seasons, in Greek mythology, the goddesses of the seasons
- The Seasons (poem), an 18th-century Lithuanian poem by Kristijonas Donelaitis
- The Seasons (Thomson), a 1726–1730 poetry cycle by James Thomson

== Music and dance ==
- The Seasons (Haydn), an 1801 oratorio by Joseph Haydn
- The Seasons (Tchaikovsky), an 1876 set of character pieces for piano by Pyotr Ilyich Tchaikovsky
- The Seasons (ballet), an 1899 ballet by Marius Petipa to the music of Alexander Glazunov
- The Seasons (Cage), a 1947 ballet by Merce Cunningham to music of John Cage
- Ballet des Saisons (The Seasons), a 1661 ballet by Jean-Baptiste Lully
- "The Seasons", a song by Lynyrd Skynyrd from Skynyrd's First and... Last, 1978

== Film and television ==
- The Seasons (1954 film), a Canadian documentary short film
- The Seasons (2025 film), a Portuguese documentary film
- The Seasons (TV series), a 1987–1988 Hong Kong drama series
- The Seasons (TV program), a South Korean music talk show that debuted in 2023
- Seasons of the Year, a 1975 film by Artavazd Peleshyan

== Visual arts ==
- The Seasons (Mucha), the name of three different series of color lithographs by Alphonse Mucha

== See also ==
- Season (disambiguation), including uses of Seasons and The Season
- The Four Seasons (disambiguation)
