= Four Seasons =

The Four Seasons, originally referring to the traditional seasons of spring, summer, autumn, and winter (typical of a temperate climate), may refer to:

== Music ==
- The Four Seasons (Vivaldi), a 1725 set of four violin concerti by Antonio Vivaldi
- Estaciones Porteñas, or The Four Seasons of Buenos Aires, four 1965–1969 tango compositions by Astor Piazzolla
- The Four Seasons (band), an American pop/rock band
- Four Seasons (Indonesian band), a Mandopop group
- Four Seasons (Bobby Hutcherson album), 1985
- Four Seasons (Toshiko Akiyoshi Trio album), 1990
- Four Seasons, an album by Paul Oakenfold, 2012
- Four Seasons, an EP by Kaddisfly, 2006
- "Four Seasons" (song), by Taeyeon, 2019
- "4 Seasons" (song), by Ellie Goulding, 2026
- "Four Seasons", a song by Brent Faiyaz from Icon, 2026

== Visual arts ==
- Four Seasons (Chagall), a 1974 mosaic designed by Marc Chagall
- Four Seasons (sculpture set), an artwork on the campus of the Indianapolis Museum of Art
- The Four Seasons (Poussin), a set of four paintings by Nicolas Poussin
- The Four Seasons (Sozzi), a cycle of four frescoes by Francesco Sozzi
- The Four Seasons (Arcimboldo), a set of four paintings by Giuseppe Arcimboldo
- The Seasons (Mucha), also known as Four Seasons, a series of color lithographs by Alphonse Mucha

== Film and television ==
- Seasons of the Year (Four Seasons), a 1975 Armenian documentary film
- The Four Seasons (1979 film), a Yugoslav film directed by Petar Krelja
- The Four Seasons (1981 film), an American film directed by Alan Alda
- The Four Seasons (2000 film), an animated feature film of 2000
- Four Seasons, a 2008 UK drama TV series directed by Giles Foster
- The Four Seasons (TV series), a 2025 American comedy series
- The Four Seasons, a 1984 American TV sitcom featuring Joanna Kerns

== In business ==
- The Four Seasons Restaurant, in New York City
- Four Seasons Hotels and Resorts, a luxury hotel chain
- Four Seasons Health Care, a UK-based elderly and specialist care provider
- Four Seasons Wines, an Indian winery
- Four Seasons Total Landscaping, a Philadelphia business famous for hosting a Trump campaign press conference
- Four Seasons Town Centre, a mall in Greensboro, North Carolina, U.S.
- Four Seasons, a brand of the Spring Air Company

== Venues ==
- Four Seasons Arena, a multi-use venue in Great Falls, Montana, U.S.
- Four Seasons Centre, a 2006 Toronto opera and ballet venue

== Other uses ==
- The Four Seasons (ballet), by Jerome Robbins
- Four Seasons (card game), a patience or solitaire
- Pizza quattro stagioni, or four seasons pizza

== See also ==
- TQS (Télévision Quatre Saisons), a French-language television network in Canada
- The Seasons (disambiguation)
- Season (disambiguation)
