= Dread Champions of the Last Days =

Studio album by Sleeping Giant
- Released: May 1, 2007
- Genre: Metalcore
- Length: 47:32
- Label: Facedown

Sleeping Giant chronology
Dread Champions of the Last Days (2007)	Sons of Thunder (2009)

Professional ratings
Review scores
Source	Rating
Jesus Freak Hideout	3/5 stars
Cross Rhythms	6/10

Dread Champions of the Last Days is the debut album of the Christian metalcore band, Sleeping Giant. Multiple members of the band, xDEATHSTARx, contributed to this album. It is the only album to feature Cory Johnson, who would later join Impending Doom.

== Track listing ==
No.	Title	Length
1.	"The Army of One"	2:25
2.	"This Calls For Patient Endurance On The Part Of The Saints"	1:46
3.	"Narrow Road"	1:59
4.	"Whoremonger"	5:01
5.	"Behold the Pale Horse"	2:05
6.	"Dynasty"	2:58
7.	"Covenant"	2:21
8.	"Blame it on the Holy Rollers" (feat: Brook Reeves of Impending Doom)	2:24
9.	"The Power Of Prayer"	1:44
10.	"Sleeping Giant" (feat: Bruce LePage of 100 Demons)	4:07
11.	"No Sleep From My Eyes"	1:47
12.	"King Of Kings"	6:05
13.	"Oh Praise Him"	5:04
14.	"This Is The Word"	7:46

== Credits ==
Sleeping Giant

- Travis Boyd - Drums, backing vocals
- Tom Green - Vocals
- Cory Johnson - Guitar
- Geoff Brouillette - Guitar

Additional musicians

- Ryan Bermuda - Backing vocals
- Brook Reeves (Impending Doom) - Vocals
- Bruce - Vocals
- Burak 'Loomis The Turk' Erin - Backing vocals
- Charles Bybee - Backing vocals
- Kevin Davis - Backing vocals
- Eric "E-Money" Gregson - Backing vocals
- Ron Fox - Backing vocals
- Stafford Heppenstall - Backing vocals
- Tom Brady - Bass guitar

Production

- Joe Marchiano - Mastering, mixing
- Dave Quiggle - Artwork, layout design, backing vocals
