= The Sin and Doom Vol. II =

Studio album by Impending Doom
- Released: June 22, 2018
- Genre: Deathcore
- Length: 35:50
- Label: eOne
- Producers: Manny Contreras; Christopher Eck; Eric Correa

Impending Doom chronology
Death Will Reign (2013)	The Sin and Doom Vol. II (2018)	At the Throne of God (2027)

Singles from The Sin and Doom Vol. II
- 1. "The Wretched and Godless" Released: February 2, 2018

The Sin and Doom Vol. II is the sixth studio album by American Christian deathcore band Impending Doom. The album was released on June 22, 2018. The title of the album is a reference to Impending Doom's first demo release, The Sin and Doom of Godless Men, released in 2005. The band members produced the album in a more hands-on style than their previous releases, with the assistance of Christopher Eck who produced Nailed. Dead. Risen., the band's 2007 debut album.

== Critical reception ==
Professional ratings
Review scores
Source	Rating
Cryptic Rock	3.5/5 stars
Distorted Sound	8/10 stars
HM	3.5/5 stars
Metal Injection	6/10 stars
New Noise	5/5 stars
New Transcendence	9/10 stars

The album received limited but generally positive reviews. Of the reviews collected, New Noise gave the album a perfect 5 out of 5, stating: "Trying to poke flaws in this album would just be fruitless work, for Impending Doom has successfully put together the best metal LP of the year so far." Giving the album 3.5 out of 5 stars, HM Magazine noted that: "the new album surely won't disappoint fans of the band's catalog, even though it doesn't quite illustrate a deliberate personal relationship with Jesus as Nailed. Dead. Risen." Amber Stevens of Metal Injection, giving the album 6 out of 10, described it as "damn well punishing enough for even the most critical, die-hard fans of the genre" and "a straight-forward, heavy hitting assault of the senses".

== Track listing ==
No.	Title	Music	Length
1.	"The Wretched and Godless"	Eric Correa, Brook Reeves	3:06
2.	"Burn"	Manny Contreras, Brook Reeves	2:38
3.	"War Music"	Manny Contreras, Brook Reeves	5:19
4.	"Evil"	Eric Correa, Brook Reeves	2:22
5.	"Paved with Bones"	Eric Correa, Brook Reeves	3:22
6.	"The Serpents Tongue"	Eric Correa, Brook Reeves	2:57
7.	"Unbroken"	Manny Contreras, Brook Reeves	4:05
8.	"Devils Den"	Manny Contreras, Brook Reeves	4:02
9.	"Everything's Fake"	Eric Correa, Brook Reeves	3:45
10.	"Run for Your Life (She Calls)"	Manny Contreras, Brook Reeves	4:11
Total length:			35:50

== Personnel ==
Impending Doom

- Brook Reeves – vocals, composition, engineering
- Manny Contreras – lead guitar, production, composition, engineering
- Eric Correa – rhythm guitar, production, composition, engineering
- David Sittig – bass, engineering
- Brandon Trahan – drums, engineering

Additional personnel

- Christopher Eck – production, engineering, mixing, tracking
- Joe Butler – photography
