= Blood Meridian (disambiguation) =

Blood Meridian is a 1985 novel by Cormac McCarthy.

Blood Meridian may also refer to:

- Blood Meridian (band), a Canadian music group
- Blood Meridian (album), a 1997 album by Canadian band Numb
- Blood Meridian, a 2006 EP by English band Hope of the States
- "Blood Meridian", a track from the 2011 self-titled album Heavy Metal Kings
- "Blood Meridian", a track from the 2014 album Finished People, by Sleeping Giant
- Blood Meridian, an upcoming film based on the novel of the same name, to be directed by John Hillcoat.
