= The Serpent Servant =

Studio album by Impending Doom
- Released: March 31, 2009
- Recorded: 2008–2009
- Studio: Lambesis Studios
- Genre: Deathcore
- Length: 35:07
- Label: Facedown
- Producers: Tim Lambesis; Daniel Castleman

Impending Doom chronology
Nailed. Dead. Risen. (2007)	The Serpent Servant (2009)	There Will Be Violence (2010)

Professional ratings
Review scores
Source	Rating
Indie Vision Music	5/5
Jesus Freak Hideout	3/5 stars

The Serpent Servant is the second studio album by American Christian deathcore band Impending Doom. They worked with the metalcore band As I Lay Dying vocalist Tim Lambesis and his production partner Daniel Castleman to record the album. The album was released in the US on March 31, 2009, from Facedown Records and on March 30, 2009, through Siege of Amida Records.

The album reached No. 144 on the Billboard 200 and No. 3 on the Heatseekers Albums chart. It sold 4,300 copies in its first week of release. It is the last album by the band to feature lead guitarist Manny Contreras before he rejoined the band in 2012, the first to feature rhythm guitarist Cory Johnson (ex-Sleeping Giant), and the only album to feature drummer Chad Blackwell.

In 2021, Joe Smith-Engelhardt of Alternative Press included the album in his list of "30 deathcore albums from the 2000s that define the genre".

== Track listing ==
No.	Title	Length
1.	"When Waters Run Deep"	1:01
2.	"The Serpent Servant"	3:26
3.	"Anything Goes"	4:42
4.	"Storming the Gates of Hell"	3:43
5.	"Welcome to Forever"	3:46
6.	"More Than Conquerors"	4:27
7.	"Revival: America"	2:35
8.	"In the House of Mourning"	2:38
9.	"When I Speak"	3:52
10.	"City of Refuge"	2:42
11.	"Beginnings"	2:55
Total length:		35:07

== Personnel ==
Impending Doom

- Brook Reeves – vocals
- Manny Contreras – lead guitar
- Cory Johnson – rhythm guitar
- David Sittig – bass
- Chad Blackwell – drums

Production

- Tim Lambesis – production
- Daniel Castleman – production, engineering
- Kelly "Carnage" Cairns – engineering
- Zeuss – engineering, mixing, mastering
- Shawn Carrano – management
- Colin Marks – artwork
