= Nailed. Dead. Risen. =

Studio album by Impending Doom
- Released: September 4, 2007
- Recorded: 2007
- Genres: Brutal death metal, Christian metal, grindcore
- Length: 34:37
- Label: Facedown
- Producer: Christopher Eck

Impending Doom chronology
The Sin and Doom of Godless Men (2005)	Nailed. Dead. Risen. (2007)	The Serpent Servant (2009)

Nailed. Dead. Risen. is the debut studio album by American Christian death metal band Impending Doom, released on September 4, 2007 on Facedown Records.

== Background ==
Nailed. Dead. Risen. was tracked, mixed and mastered by Christopher Eck at Eck studios in Corona, California. The title for the album is a reference to the way Jesus Christ was crucified. It is the only album by the band to feature guitarist Greg Pewthers and drummer Andy Hegg. They were replaced by Cory Johnson (ex-Sleeping Giant) and Chad Blackwell, respectively.

The album features re-recordings of three songs from the band's demo album titled The Sin and Doom of Godless Men. The band even intended to completely re-record that demo into an EP, but due to them getting signed to a label faster than they even expected, they instead recorded this full-length album.

Professional ratings
Review scores
Source	Rating
Exclaim!	
HM	
Jesus Freak Hideout	2/5 stars
Stylus Magazine	B

== Track listing ==
No.	Title	Length
1.	"Left Behind"	0:59
2.	"My Nemesis"	2:51
3.	"In Reverence Of" (re-recording from the band's 2005 demo)	2:57
4.	"The Mark of the Faithful"	3:23
5.	"Nailed. Dead. Risen."	3:37
6.	"Condemned" (re-recording from the band's 2005 demo)	2:47
7.	"At the Churches' End"	2:51
8.	"Silence the Oppressors"	3:11
9.	"For All Have Sinned" (re-recording from the band's 2005 demo)	2:43
10.	"Feeding the Decomposing"	3:04
11.	"He's Coming Back" (song ends at 1:25; a hidden track begins at 4:05)	6:16
Total length:		34:37

== Personnel ==
Impending Doom

- Brook Reeves – vocals
- Manny Contreras – lead guitar
- Greg Pewthers – rhythm guitar
- David Sittig – bass
- Andy Hegg – drums

Production

- Christopher Eck – production, mixing, mastering, recording
- Dave Quiggle – artwork
