= Dead Poetic =

American rock band

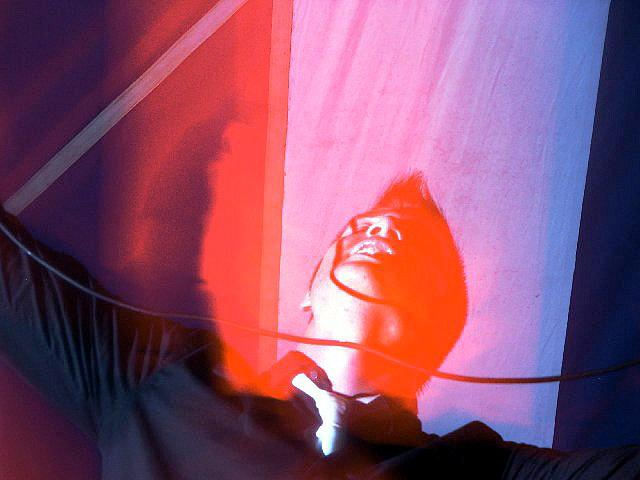
- Frontman Brandon Rike at the 2003 Cornerstone Festival

Background information
- Also known as: Mindset, DP or dp
- Origin: Dayton, Ohio, U.S.
- Genres: Post-hardcore, alternative rock
- Years active: 1997–2007
- Labels: Tooth & Nail, Solid State
- Past members: Brandon Rike; Zach Miles; Jesse Sprinkle; John Brehm; Chad Shellabarger; Josh Shellabarger; Todd Osborn; Dusty Redmon

Dead Poetic was an American rock band formed in Dayton, Ohio in 1997. Their most recent lineup consisted of vocalist Brandon Rike, guitarist Zach Miles, and drummer Jesse Sprinkle. They released three albums and a greatest hits album, The Finest, on Tooth & Nail Records. The band lapsed into inactivity in 2007 due to internal strife and inability to tour, and in 2015 Rike stated that the band has no plans to reform or record a fourth album.

== History ==
=== Formation ===
Dead Poetic was formed in 1997 when members Zach Miles, Brandon Rike, and Chad Shellabarger were at the age of 13. Josh Shellabarger was then 15. The band formed in their local church, and taught themselves to play. Their first show was at the three teenagers' middle school's annual talent show. The band went by the name MindSet, before changing it to Ded Poetic. Later they changed the name to Dead Poetic.

=== 1997–2002 ===
The band first garnered attention in the underground music scene following the release of their 1999 EP Invasion, then their full-length record Four Wall Blackmail, which was released by Tooth & Nail subsidiary Solid State Records, and single "August Winterman". Their second release, 2004's New Medicines, heightened the band's profile considerably. Produced by Aaron Sprinkle (Emery, Acceptance), the album's sales were buoyed by the title track, which became a hit on MTV2 and Fuse TV. On these first two albums, music critics had a hard time classifying the band's music: genres from emo to post-hardcore to alternative rock.

=== 2002–mid 2004 ===
After the release of New Medicines, Dead Poetic went on tour in support of Demon Hunter in the fall of 2004 and essentially imploded shortly thereafter. Personal disagreements within the band caused bassist Chad Shellabarger, drummer Josh Shellabarger, and guitarist Todd Osborn to all depart the band, and Dead Poetic appeared to be a thing of the past. But remaining members Brandon Rike (vocals) and Zach Miles (guitar) began playing with accomplished drummer Jesse Sprinkle (formerly of Poor Old Lu and Demon Hunter; also the brother of producer Aaron Sprinkle) and their passion for music reignited. Beloved alums Dusty Redmon (guitar) and John Brehm (bass) came on board to round out the new, revamped version of Dead Poetic.

=== 2004–late 2006 ===
For their third album, Vices, the band once again enlisted Aaron Sprinkle to produce the album, but this time, the band eschewed the screaming that had been one of the hallmarks of their earlier style. In an interview with CCM Magazine, Rike said, "There is no way I could get myself to scream on a song anymore. I'm just past it.". Though originally scheduled for a July 18 release, the release date for Vices was pushed back to October 31, with "Narcotic" chosen as the lead single. Dead Poetic was scheduled to tour with The Red Jumpsuit Apparatus in fall 2007, but backed out of those dates in mid-October 2006.

On November 25, 2006, Absolutepunk.net reported that Brandon Rike had left Dead Poetic and the remaining members had decided not to continue with the band. Though the band initially posted a message on their MySpace page in December 2006 stating they were still active, most fans eventually assumed the band had indeed broken up because of the band's noticeable lack of touring. Guitarist Dusty Redmon confirmed the band's disbanding on absolutepunk.net in September 2007: "When Brandon left the band back in October (before "Vices" came out), a lot of big stuff was going on. We had great tour plans, a batch of new songs we were in to, and just kind of a new sense of freshness about the band. Brandon had been sort of "over it" for a long time, and just sort of picked a bad time to bail. He loves doing design, and being hang-out-at-home-type of husband, which is cool. I kind of called "NOT IT" when it came to making an announcement, but I guess so did everyone else. T&N put a lot of initial money into the record, only to see the band fall apart before the release, causing them to basically drop the entire promotion campaign. Sorry to those who were led on by thinking we were still active. Jesse is recording, Brandon is designing, John is tattooing, Zach just had a new baby, and I'm playing in The Almost."

=== 2006–2015 ===
Dead Poetic has stated that they plan to continue writing music, and to fulfill their existing contract with Tooth & Nail Records; such plans have gone unfulfilled, however. On October 30, 2007, Jesse Sprinkle posted a MySpace bulletin reiterating that the band was still indeed together. "Contrary to popular opinion and the mighty Wikipedia, Dead Poetic has not broken up. We are still a band indeed....we figured we'd post it to the public....we assure you that Dead Poetic is alive." He went on to say that the band's label, Tooth and Nail, would be releasing a "Best Of" album for Dead Poetic in the near future, and that the band hopes to start writing songs for a new record very soon. The "Best Of" album was since released, but despite all such claims of producing new music, the band has remained inactive since.

On November 16, 2007, Brandon Rike posted a blog on MySpace that contained a long description, written by Brandon Rike himself, on why it's been so hard to keep the band together. In the blog, Rike focused on issues such as his marriage, Dusty Redmon playing for The Almost, tours that they missed, among other things. He also mentioned that their best-of album, The Finest hits stores on November 20, 2007. In this blog, Rike stated that Miles, Sprinkle, and himself had plans to record a new album after The Finest without any plans of going on tour. As of November 16, 2007, this announcement could be viewed at www.deadpoetic.com underneath the banner which reads "DEAD POETIC IS NOT DEAD".

As of October 20, 2008, Dead Poetic had been removed from the artists list on the official website of Tooth & Nail Records. Inside the cover of their newest album The Finest, Brandon Rike made a statement that the band would no longer be touring so he could stay home with his wife, and that the band was planning on releasing one more album. Despite these claims, the band has not released any public statements since 2008 and remained inactive. As of April 2009, the Dead Poetic website had been taken down and redirected to the band's MySpace page.

In a 2015 podcast, Brandon Rike confirmed that Dead Poetic has no intentions to reform or release any new music at this time.

== Band members ==
Final lineup

- Brandon Rike – lead vocals (1997–2007)
- Zach Miles – lead guitar, backing vocals (1997–2007)
- Jesse Sprinkle – drums (ex-Poor Old Lu, Demon Hunter, Serene UK), various others (2004–2007)

Former

- Dusty Redmon – rhythm guitar, backing vocals (2005–2006) (left to join the Almost)
- John Brehm – bass (2005–2006)
- Chad Shellabarger – bass (1997–fall 2004)
- Josh Shellabarger – drums (1997–fall 2004)
- Todd Osborn – rhythm guitar (2002–fall 2004)

Timeline

== Discography ==
- Invasion EP (1999) – independent
- Song EP (2001) – independent
- Four Wall Blackmail (2002) – Solid State Records
- New Medicines (2004) – Solid State Records/Tooth and Nail Records
- Vices (2006) – Tooth and Nail Records
- The Finest Compilation (2007) – Tooth and Nail Records

Music videos

- August Winterman (Four Wall Blackmail) – 2002
- New Medicines (New Medicines) – 2004
- Narcotic (Vices) – 2006
