= Dusty Redmon =

American guitarist (born 1982)

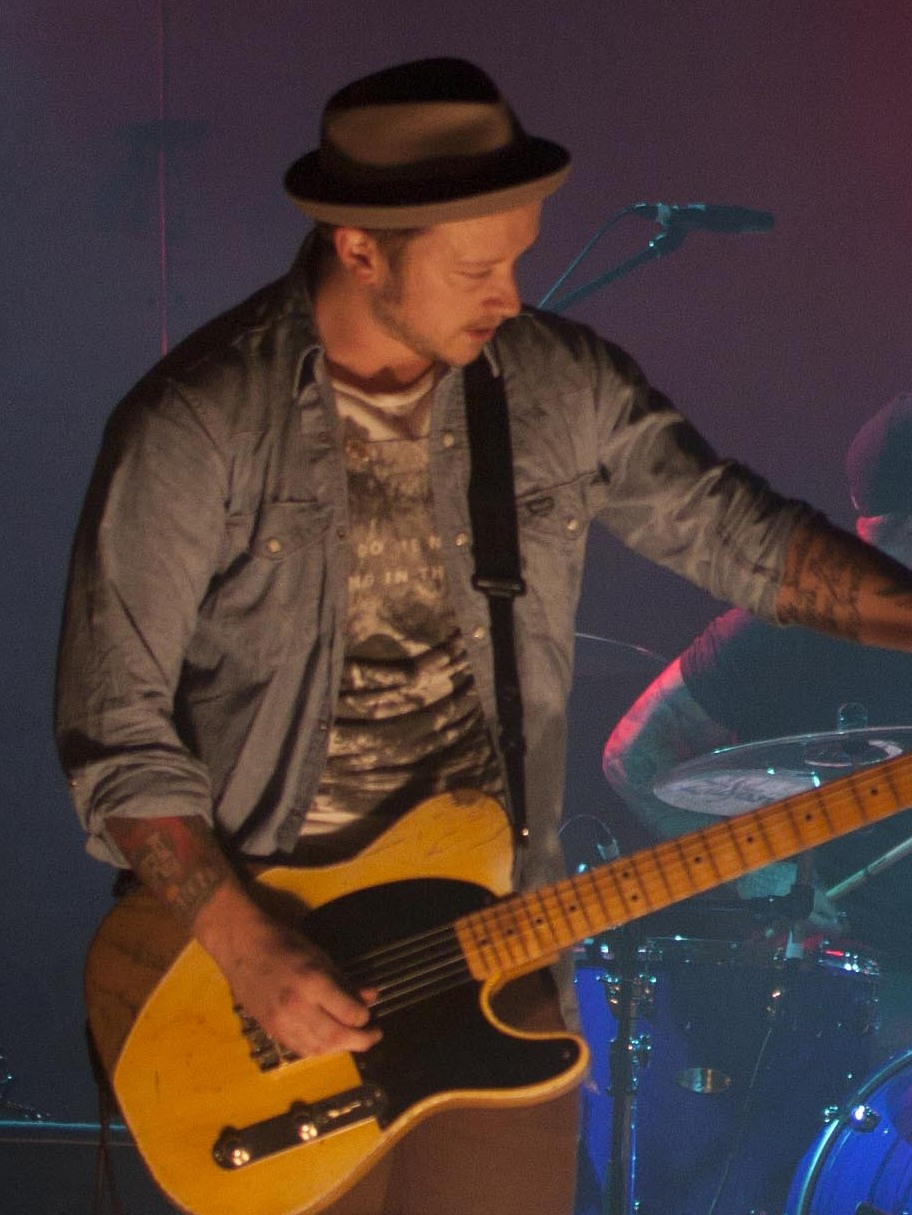
- Redmond with The Almost in 2011

Background information
- Birth name: Dustin Wesley Redmon
- Born: May 23, 1982 (age 42)
- Origin: Winston-Salem, North Carolina, United States
- Genres: Post hardcore; indie rock; emo; pop punk; alternative rock; metalcore
- Occupation: Guitarist
- Instrument(s): Vocals, guitar
- Labels: Virgin; Tooth & Nail; Solid State; Vindicated

Dustin Wesley "Dusty" Redmon (born May 23, 1982) is an American guitarist primarily known for playing in alternative rock band The Almost and former guitarist and songwriter for Beloved and Dead Poetic. He is cousins with his former bandmate, Joe Musten.

== Career as a musician ==
=== Beloved (1999-2005) ===
In 1999, along with Josh Moore, Joe Musten, John Brehm, and Matt Harrison (replacing founding member Shawn Dallas), Redmon formed influential indie/hardcore band Beloved. The band released an EP called The Running on Vindicated Records (later released by Solid State Records) and a full-length LP entitled Failure On. The band toured extensively for 5 years, alongside bands like Norma Jean, Underoath, My Chemical Romance, Avenged Sevenfold, Zao, Further Seems Forever, Between the Buried and Me, Armor for Sleep, and many others. The band dissolved in 2005 after drummer Musten left the band.

=== Dead Poetic (2005-2006) ===
After relocating to Philadelphia and marrying long-time love interest Amanda Vaughn, Redmon joined friends and labelmates Dead Poetic. The band did light touring in his two-year stint, and recorded an album entitled Vices in January and February 2006. Shortly before the release of Vices, lead vocalist Brandon Rike agreed to participate in one last tour with The Red Jumpsuit Apparatus before leaving Dead Poetic. The musicians did not want to continue without Brandon and decided to put Dead Poetic on hold. Since then, the band has not been seen on tour but original members claim they will record one final album with Tooth & Nail Records. Dusty Redmon and bass player John Brehm left Dead Poetic in the fall of 2006 and Dusty joined The Almost as a guitar player.

=== The Almost (2006-2015) ===
Long-time friend Aaron Gillespie had invited Redmon to play guitar for his new project, The Almost in early September 2006. Redmon denied, thinking he was leaving for a tour with Dead Poetic. Only a couple of weeks later, he'd find out he'd be bandless. A few months went by, and Dusty received another call from Gillespie. Redmon jumped at the chance to be in a band with an old friend, and in early 2007 began rehearsing. The Almost released a record entitled Southern Weather on April 3, and toured with Saves the Day and Say Anything, as well as Paramore, This Providence, and Love Arcade to support it. The band has since gone on to tour the US several times as well as being a part of 2010's Soundwaves Festivals in Australia. In 2009, the band released the follow-up to Southern Weather, entitled Monster, Monster. Redmon and bandmates contributed writing and performing on this record after Gillespie's prior solo offering. The band appeared on many public television shows, such as MTV and Fuse. In 2015, Gillespie announced that the band was "being put to rest".

== Discography ==
With Beloved

- Garage Demos - 1999 - Independent
- ...And So It Goes - 2000 - Independent
- The Running Pre-Release Sampler - 2001 - Independent
- The Running - 2001 - Vindicated Records
- One Night Split (w/Luti-Kriss) - 2002 - Independently
- Failure On - 2003 - Solid State Records, Broken Circles Records
- The Running (reissue) - 2004 - Solid State
- Beloved Live At Cat's Cradle - 2004 - Solid State
- Kiss It Goodbye: The Final Show (DVD) - 2005 - Solid State

With Dead Poetic

- Vices - 2006 - Tooth and Nail Records
- The Finest - 2007 - Tooth and Nail

With The Almost

- No Gift to Bring - 2008 - Tooth and Nail
- Monster EP - 2009 - Tooth and Nail
- Monster Monster - 2009 - Tooth and Nail, Virgin Records
