= Death Will Reign =

Studio album by Impending Doom
- Released: November 5, 2013
- Genre: Deathcore
- Length: 45:57
- Label: eOne
- Producer: Will Putney

Impending Doom chronology
| Baptized in Filth (2012) | Death Will Reign (2013) | The Sin and Doom Vol. II (2018) |

Death Will Reign is the fifth studio album by American Christian deathcore band Impending Doom. The album was released on November 5, 2013, and reached No. 116 on the US Billboard 200, No. 6 on Christian Albums, No. 9 on Hard Rock Albums, No. 18 on Independent Albums and No. 26 on Top Rock Albums charts.

Professional ratings
Review scores
| Source | Rating |
|---|---|
| AllMusic | Average |
| HM | Positive |
| Jesus Freak Hideout | 4.5/5 stars |

== Track listing ==
| No. | Title | Length |
|---|---|---|
| 1. | "Ravenous Disease" | 4:15 |
| 2. | "Death Will Reign" | 4:12 |
| 3. | "Beyond the Grave" | 4:48 |
| 4. | "My Own Maker" | 3:05 |
| 5. | "Doomsday" | 3:05 |
| 6. | "Rip, Tear, and Burn" | 3:02 |
| 7. | "Hellhole" | 3:52 |
| 8. | "My Blood" | 4:45 |
| 9. | "Endless" | 3:36 |
| 10. | "Live or Die" | 3:06 |
| 11. | "The Great Divine" | 8:11 |
| Total length: | | 45:57 |

== Personnel ==
Impending Doom

- Brook Reeves – vocals
- Manny Contreras – lead guitar
- Eric Correra – rhythm guitar
- David Sittig – bass
- Brandon Trahan – drums

Additional personnel

- Will Putney – production, engineering, mixing
- Mike Milford – management
