= New Medicines =

Studio album by Dead Poetic
- Released: April 6, 2004
- Recorded: September 29 – November 2, 2003, Compound Studios, Seattle, Washington
- Genre: Post-hardcore, alternative rock
- Length: 48:23
- Label: Solid State / Tooth & Nail
- Producer: Aaron Sprinkle

Dead Poetic chronology
Four Wall Blackmail (2002)	New Medicines (2004)	Vices (2006)

Professional ratings
Review scores
Source	Rating
Allmusic	3/5 stars
Jesus Freak Hideout	4/5 stars

New Medicines is the second album by Dead Poetic. Released April 6, 2004, through Solid State Records and Tooth & Nail Records. On June 28, 2004, it was released in the UK by Golf Records and Plastic Head Distribution. The song "New Medicines" appears on the soundtrack of the 2005 video game WWE WrestleMania 21.

== Track listing ==
All music written by Dead Poetic. All lyrics written by Brandon Rike.

No.	Title	Length
1.	"Taste the Red Hands"	2:58
2.	"The Dream Club Murders"	3:49
3.	"New Medicines"	4:01
4.	"Vanus Empty"	3:55
5.	"Bury the Difference"	3:33
6.	"Molotov"	3:46
7.	"Glass in the Trees"	5:01
8.	"Dimmer Light"	4:06
9.	"Hostages"	3:22
10.	"Modern Morbid Prophecies"	3:52
11.	"A Hoax to Live For" (song ends at 3:00)	10:08
12.	"Zonshine" (hidden track, starts at 4:20)

== Personnel ==
- Brandon Rike – vocals
- Zach Miles – lead guitar
- Chad Shellabarger – bass
- Jesse Sprinkle – drums
- Todd Osborn – rhythm guitar
- Aaron Sprinkle – production, engineering, keyboards on "Dimmer Light"
- Zach Hodges – engineering, piano on "Zonshine"
- Jr McNeely – mixing
- Troy Glessner – mastering
- Phil Peterson – cello on "Dimmer Light"
