= There Will Be Violence =

Studio album by Impending Doom
- Released: July 20, 2010
- Genre: Deathcore
- Length: 34:09
- Label: Facedown
- Producers: Tim Lambesis; Daniel Castleman

Impending Doom chronology
The Serpent Servant (2009)	There Will Be Violence (2010)	Baptized in Filth (2012)

Singles from There Will Be Violence
- 1. "There Will Be Violence" Released: September 6, 2010

There Will Be Violence is the third studio album by American Christian deathcore band Impending Doom and was released worldwide on July 20, 2010, via Facedown Records. It is the first with drummer Brandon Trahan, formerly of xDeathstarx. Trahan was asked by former bandmate Cory Johnson to join Impending Doom after drummer Isaac Bueno left the band prior to the recording of the album. It also the first album not to feature founding member Manny Contreras on guitar, although he is credited with writing some of material on the record.

== Critical reception ==
Professional ratings
Review scores
Source	Rating
Jesus Freak Hideout	4/5 stars

The album received generally positive reviews. Of the reviews collected, the NewReview gave the album a perfect 5 out of 5 and stated: "Impending Doom has found their niche in the metal market by skillfully balancing brutality and finesse. They have taken the lessons learned from previous albums and evolved into the band they were always meant to be."

== Track listing ==
All lyrics are written by Brook Reeves (except where noted); all music is composed by Impending Doom.

No.	Title	Music	Length
1.	"Hell Breaks Loose"	Brook Reeves, David Sittig, Manny Contreras	1:16
2.	"There Will Be Violence"	Reeves, Sittig, Johnson, Contreras, Trahan	3:05
3.	"Orphans" (featuring Tim Lambesis)	Reeves, Johnson	3:55
4.	"Peace Illusion"	Reeves, Sittig	3:11
5.	"The Great Fear" (featuring Vincent Bennett)	Reeves, Sittig, Johnson, Trahan	4:37
6.	"Walking Through Fire"	Reeves, Johnson	2:47
7.	"Love Has Risen"	Reeves, Sittig, Johnson, Trahan, Contreras	4:43
8.	"The Son Is Mine"	Reeves, Sittig, Johnson	3:33
9.	"Children of Wrath"	Reeves, Johnson	3:13
10.	"Sweating Blood"	Reeves, Sittig, Johnson, Contreras	3:45
Total length:			34:09

== Personnel ==
Impending Doom

- Brook Reeves – vocals, vocal production
- Cory Johnson – guitars, engineering
- David Sittig – bass
- Brandon Trahan – drums

Additional musicians

- Tim Lambesis – guest vocals on "Orphans", vocal production
- Vincent Bennett – guest vocals on "The Great Fear"

Additional personnel

- Daniel Castleman – production, engineering, mixing
- Alan Douches – mastering
- Khalil Rountree – sampling
- Alex Camarena – drum engineering
- Shawn Carrano – management
- Cody Delong – booking
- Mike Milford – artwork
