= Glass Casket (EP) =

EP by Glass Casket
- Released: June 9, 2023
- Studio: The Basement Studios, Winston-Salem, North Carolina
- Genre: Deathcore; technical death metal; progressive metal
- Length: 13:36
- Label: Silent Pendulum
- Producer: Jamie King

Glass Casket chronology
Desperate Man's Diary (2006)	Glass Casket (2023)

Singles from Glass Casket
- 1. "Let Them Go" Released: March 16, 2023

Professional ratings
Review scores
Source	Rating
Distorted Sound	8/10
New Noise	5/5 stars
Punktastic	Positive

Glass Casket is an EP by American deathcore band Glass Casket. The EP was released on June 9, 2023 through Silent Pendulum Records.

== Background ==
Shortly after the release of the band's second album, Desperate Man's Diary, Glass Casket became mostly inactive as the members focused on other projects. In January 2014, it was announced that guitarist Wes Hauch had joined the band. Around this same time, band members stated that they were writing material for a new Glass Casket record.

On January 27, 2023, Silent Pendulum Records founder and CEO Michael Kadner announced that Glass Casket had been signed to the label and that a new record would be released later in the year; additionally, Kadner also announced that Silent Pendulum had obtained the rights to We Are Gathered Here Today and Desperate Man's Diary and would be reissuing the albums on vinyl. After spending more than a decade in development hell, Glass Casket released its first new song in 17 years, "Let Them Go", on March 16 as the lead single from the upcoming release. That same day, the band announced that it would be releasing a self-titled EP on June 9.

== Track listing ==
No.	Title	Length
1.	"Merrymaker"	1:17
2.	"Let Them Go"	2:44
3.	"Prison of Empathy"	3:30
4.	"For the Living"	6:03
Total length:		13:36

== Personnel ==
Glass Casket

- Adam Cody – vocals
- Wes Hauch – lead guitar
- Dustie Waring – guitar, bass
- Blake Richardson – drums

Additional

- Jamie King – producer, mixing, mastering
- Corey Meyers – cover, artwork
- Taylor Bates – layout
