= Four Wall Blackmail =

Studio album by Dead Poetic
- Released: March 2, 2002
- Recorded: January 3–22, 2002, Little Rock, Arkansas
- Genre: Post-hardcore
- Length: 38:21
- Label: Solid State Records
- Producer: Barry Poynter; Jason Magnussen

Dead Poetic chronology
Four Wall Blackmail (2002)	New Medicines (2004)

Professional ratings
Review scores
Source	Rating
AllMusic	3/5 stars
Jesus Freak Hideout	5/5 stars

Four Wall Blackmail is Dead Poetic's debut full-length album, released in 2002 through Solid State Records.

== Track listing ==
No.	Title	Length
1.	"Burgundy"	3:43
2.	"The Corporate Enthusiast"	3:06
3.	"A Green Desire"	3:30
4.	"Four Wall Blackmail"	5:31
5.	"August Winterman"	4:02
6.	"Ollie Otson"	3:33
7.	"Bliss Tearing Eyes"	4:05
8.	"Stereochild"	4:20
9.	"Arlington Arms"	3:06
10.	"Tell Myself Goodbye"	3:21

== Writing credits ==
All music written by Dead Poetic.
All lyrics written by Brandon Rike

Except

- "Bliss Tearing Eyes" – written by Brandon Rike and Zach Miles

== Personnel ==
Dead Poetic

- Brandon Rike – Vocals
- Zach Miles – Guitars
- Chad Shellabarger – Bass
- Josh Shellabarger – Drums

Production

- Barry Poynter – Production, mixing
- Jason Magnussen – Production
- Brian Gardner – Mastering
- David Johnson – Band photography
- Autumn Fisher – Additional photography
- Brandon Ebel – Executive producer
