= Vices (Dead Poetic album) =

Studio album by Dead Poetic
- Released: October 31, 2006
- Recorded: February–March 2006
- Genre: Alternative rock, hard rock
- Length: 50:51
- Label: Tooth & Nail
- Producer: Aaron Sprinkle

Dead Poetic chronology
New Medicines (2004)	Vices (2006)	The Finest (2007)

Professional ratings
Review scores
Source	Rating
AbsolutePunk.net	(63%)
Allmusic	4.5/5 stars
Jesus Freak Hideout	4/5 stars

Vices is the third full-length album by alternative rock band Dead Poetic. The album was released on October 31, 2006 through Tooth & Nail Records. Aaron Sprinkle once again produced the album, and Chino Moreno of Deftones contributed guest vocals to "Paralytic." Lead vocalist Brandon Rike left the band shortly before the album's release and the band's remaining members opted not to continue with the band, although recently it has been stated that the band has not broken up, and will continue writing music.

The album is a departure from Dead Poetic's earlier work in many ways. First, only Rike and guitarist Zach Miles remained from the band's lineup on its 2004 breakthrough, New Medicines. Second, Rike does not scream on the record, thus abandoning the band's earlier post-hardcore sound in favor of straight-up rock & roll. Finally, as a result of this shift in styles, Vices is released solely through Tooth & Nail, not through Tooth & Nail's heavier subsidiary Solid State Records, which released the band's first two albums.

Vices peaked at #7 on the Billboard Heatseekers Chart.

== Track listing ==
No.	Title	Length
1.	"Cannibal vs. Cunning"	3:28
2.	"Lioness"	3:27
3.	"Self-Destruct & Die"	3:36
4.	"Narcotic"	3:00
5.	"In Coma"	4.00
6.	"Long Forgotten"	3:20
7.	"Pretty Pretty"	2:54
8.	"Sinless City"	4:13
9.	"The Victim"	4:01
10.	"Paralytic"	4:23
11.	"Animals"	2:40
12.	"Crashing Down"	3:33
13.	"Copy of a Copy"	2:45
14.	"Vices"	5:35

== Credit ==
- Brandon Rike—vocals
- Zach Miles— lead guitar
- Dusty Redmon— rhythm guitar
- John Brehm—bass
- Jesse Sprinkle—drums
- Chino Moreno—guest vocals on "Paralytic"; co-producer of "Paralytic" and "Crashing Down"
- Phil Peterson—strings on "Vices"
- Chad Johnson—A&R
- Produced by Aaron Sprinkle
- Mixed by Josh Wilbur
- Mastered by Howie Weinberg
- Art Design by Ryan Clark
