= Sons of Thunder (Sleeping Giant album) =

Studio album by Sleeping Giant
- Released: June 23, 2009
- Genre: Metalcore
- Length: 47:32
- Label: Facedown Records
- Producer: Charles Bybee

Sleeping Giant chronology
Dread Champions of the Last Days (2007)	Sons of Thunder (2009)	Kingdom Days in an Evil Age (2011)

Professional ratings
Review scores
Source	Rating
Jesus Freak Hideout	3.5/5 stars
Indie Vision Music	4/5 stars
Cross Rhythms	7/10

Sons of Thunder is the second album of the Christian metalcore band, Sleeping Giant. It is the first album to officially feature Guitarist Eric Gregson and Bassist J.R. Bermuda.

== Track listing ==
No.	Title	Length
1.	"Gang Signs"	2:38
2.	"No One Leaves This Room Sick"	2:47
3.	"Sons Of Thunder"	6:36
4.	"Descending Into Hell [feat. Bruce LePage of 100 Demons]"	2:33
5.	"The Streets Don't Lie"	5:33
6.	"The Army Of The Chosen One [feat. Ryan Clark of Demon Hunter & Krissi Green]"	3:33
7.	"I've Seen [feat. Dawn Johnson]"	6:48
8.	"Confession"	3:02
9.	"He Will Reign"	8:04

== Credits ==
Sleeping Giant

- J.R. Bermuda - Bass
- Travis Boyd - Drums
- Geoff Brouillette - Guitar
- Tommy Green - Vocals
- Eric Gregson - Guitar

Additional Musicians

- Ryan Clark - Guest Vocals on track 6
- Dawn Johnson - Choir/Chorus, Management, Performer
- Joe Marchiano - Choir/Chorus
- Chris Ryan - Choir/Chorus
- George Bowker - Piano

Production

- Charles Bybee - Audio Engineer, Audio Production, Engineer, Producer
- Darian Cowgill - Mixing
- Troy Glessner - Engineer, Mastering
- Beth Jahnsen - Management
- Dave Quiggle - Cover Art
