= Correspondence (A Fiction) =

Studio album by Levi the Poet
- Released: November 17, 2014
- Genre: Spoken word
- Length: 49:48

Correspondence (A Fiction) is the second studio album by Levi the Poet, and he released the album on November 17, 2014.

== Critical reception ==
Professional ratings
Review scores
Source	Rating
HM Magazine	3.5/5 stars
Indie Vision Music	4/5 stars
Jesus Freak Hideout	4.5/5 stars

Jordan Gonzales, giving the album three and a half stars for HM Magazine, writes, "Correspondence is a chaotic and beautiful mess of supercharged spoken word set to a documentary soundtrack of a backbone that avoids clichés." Awarding the album four and a half stars from Jesus Freak Hideout, Mark Rice states, "this album contains all the tools necessary for it to do so; a compelling story, an emotive score, superb writing, excellent delivery, and thoughtful content." Scott Fryberger, rating the album four and a half stars at Jesus Freak Hideout, says, "This is one of Levi's finest releases; if you're a fan of his or a fan of wonderful storytelling, this is an album for you." Giving the album four stars by Indie Vision Music, Ian Zandi describes, "While the stories may have depressing notes, he tells it like it is. Honest."

== Track listing ==
Track listing
No.	Title	Length
1.	"Chapter One: When Hearts Are Large"	2:32
2.	"Chapter Two: Tombstone Love Note"	2:33
3.	"Chapter Three: The Great American Game"	4:12
4.	"Chapter Four: Rooster Cogburn in Indian Territory"	2:57
5.	"Chapter Five: Tuxedo Black"	4:04
6.	"Chapter Six: Traditional Values"	4:19
7.	"Chapter Seven: Orphan Theism"	2:10
8.	"Chapter Eight: White Whales Like Black Plagues"	3:09
9.	"Chapter Nine: Cap Gun Death"	2:59
10.	"Chapter Ten: [Like Cushions]"	1:13
11.	"Chapter Eleven: Cul-De-Sac Colonies"	5:01
12.	"Chapter Twelve: Shores, and the New World"	4:39
Total length:		47:53
