= Baptized in Filth =

Studio album by Impending Doom
- Released: March 13, 2012
- Recorded: November 2011 – February 2012
- Genre: Deathcore
- Length: 34:34
- Label: eOne
- Producer: Andreas Magnussen

Impending Doom chronology
There Will Be Violence (2010)	Baptized in Filth (2012)	Death Will Reign (2013)

Singles from Baptized in Filth
- 1. "For the Wicked" Released: January 17, 2012; 2. "Murderer" Released: March 8, 2012; 3. "Deceiver" Released: June 26, 2012

Baptized in Filth is the fourth studio album by American Christian deathcore band Impending Doom. It was released on March 13, 2012 through the eOne Music label. The lead single released for the album is "For the Wicked", which had a music video produced for it. A music video for the song "Murderer" was released by the band in support of the album, and lastly, the band released the video for the song "Deceiver" on June 26, 2012.

The band played on the Metal Alliance Tour 2012 alongside DevilDriver, The Faceless, Dying Fetus, Job for a Cowboy and 3 Inches of Blood.

The album was produced by Andreas Magnussen who produced albums for (The Black Dahlia Murder and The Famine) and mixed by Machine who has previously worked with (Suicide Silence, Demon Hunter and Lamb of God). It is the last album by the band to feature guitarist Cory Johnson before his firing from the band in June 2012.

== Background ==
The concept of the album, explained by bassist David Sittig:

"Baptized in Filth represents the mindless indulgance [sic] and self-worship in the vile world we live in. This album is meant to scare the Hell out of you!"

— David Sittig

Professional ratings
Review scores
Source	Rating
Der Metal Krieger	7/10 stars
Lambgoat	6/10 stars
Real Metal	7/10 stars

== Track listing ==
All lyrics are written by Brook Reeves; all music is composed by Impending Doom.

No.	Title	Length
1.	"Murderer"	4:22
2.	"For the Wicked"	3:33
3.	"Chaos: Reborn"	3:55
4.	"Deceiver"	3:36
5.	"Falling Away"	3:41
6.	"Absolute Horror"	1:56
7.	"Angry Letters to God"	3:11
8.	"Baptized in Filth"	2:28
9.	"My Light Unseen" (featuring Ryan Clark)	3:42
10.	"Death. Ascension. Resurrection."	4:10
Total length:		34:34

== Personnel ==
Impending Doom

- Brook Reeves – vocals
- Cory Johnson – guitars
- David Sittig – bass
- Brandon Trahan – drums

Additional musicians

- Ryan Clark – guest vocals on "My Light Unseen"

Additional personnel

- Andreas Magnussen – production, engineering
- Alan Douches – mastering
