= Remove the Earth =

Studio album by Advent
- Released: February 12, 2008
- Genre: Christian metalcore
- Length: 45:00
- Label: Solid State
- Producers: Al Jacob, Mitchell Marlow

Advent chronology
Three Track Demo (2007)	Remove the Earth (2008)	Naked and Cold (2009)

Professional ratings
Review scores
Source	Rating
Cross Rhythms	5/10 stars
Jesus Freak Hideout	4/5 stars
Sputnikmusic	3/5 stars

Remove the Earth is the debut full-length album by Christian metal band Advent. It was released February 12, 2008 through Solid State Records.

== Track listing ==
No.	Title	Length
1.	"Blackout"	3:52
2.	"Eulogy"	3:02
3.	"Set Apart"	3:42
4.	"Hanging the Giants (Featuring Ryan Clark of Demon Hunter)"	4:11
5.	"The Anger of Death"	3:31
6.	"Reflection"	2:45
7.	"Doubt. Fear. Desolation."	3:11
8.	"Three Seasons"	6:30
9.	"The Cost"	3:42
10.	"I Am"	10:35

== Trivia ==
- Last three minutes contains the song "One Crushing Blow" from their Three Track Demo

== Personnel ==
Advent

- Joe Musten - vocals
- Matt Harrison - Guitar
- Mike Rich - Guitar
- Johnny Smrdel - Bass
- Chris Ankelein - drums

Additional Musicians

- Ryan Clark (Demon Hunter) - Guest Vocals on track 4

Production

- Al Jacob - Producer
- Mitchell Marlow - Producer
