= Naked and Cold =

Studio album by Advent
- Released: September 8, 2009
- Genres: Christian metal, hardcore punk, Christian hardcore
- Length: 41:55
- Label: Solid State
- Producers: Al Jacob; Mitchell Marlow; Alberto Jacob; Jamie King

Advent chronology
Remove the Earth (2008)	Naked and Cold (2009)	Pain and Suffering (2016)

Professional ratings
Review scores
Source	Rating
Sputnikmusic	4/5 stars
Scene Point Blank	8.0/10 stars

Naked and Cold is the second album by hardcore punk band Advent. It was released in September, 2009.

== Track listing ==
1. Intro (Instrumental) - 1:30
2. Nothing - 2:02
3. Overcome - 3:05
4. Naked and Cold - 4:04
5. Fatherless (Instrumental) - 3:14
6. Pack of Fools - 2:05
7. Revival - 2:57
8. Crown of Thorns - 2:29
9. Golgotha - 3:00
10. Pierced with Grief - 3:31
11. With Anger - 2:35
12. Out of Line - 4:08
13. Blackness of Day (Instrumental) - 7:15

== Credits ==
Advent

- Joe Musten - Vocals
- Johnny Smrdel - Bass
- Matthew Harrison - Guitar
- Michael Rich - Guitar, Backing Vocals
- Chris Ankelein - Drums

Production

- Ryan Clark - Design
- Troy Glessner - Mastering
- Al Jacob - Engineer, Mixing, Producer
- Alberto Jacob - Engineer, Mixing, Producer
- Jamie King - Engineer, Producer
- Brian Kroll - A&R
- Ethan Luck - Photography
- Mitchell Marlow - Mixing, Producer
