= Levi the Poet =

Levi the Poet and the great
- Also known as: Levi the Poet
- Born: Levi Morgan Macallister; July 26, 1989 (age 37)
- Origin: Albuquerque, New Mexico
- Genres: Spoken word
- Occupations: Singer, songwriter
- Instrument: Vocals
- Years active: 2007–present
- Labels: Come&Live!
- Website: levithepoet.net

Levi Morgan MacAllister (born July 26, 1989), who goes by the stage name Levi the Poet, is an American spoken word artist. His first release, Werewolves, was released independently in 2009. The subsequent release, an extended play, Monologues, was released by Come&Live! Records, in 2011. He released a studio album with Come & Live Records, Seasons, in 2012. His follow-up studio album, Correspondence (A Fiction), was released independently, in 2014.

== Early life ==
MacAllister was born as Levi Morgan MacAllister, on July 26, 1989, the son of a preacher, Mark Stephen MacAllister, and his mother, Jody McEwen MacAllister, where he is a native of Albuquerque, New Mexico. He is an older brother to sister, Bree. His father died on January 7, 2011, by committing suicide, and this has led MacAllister to be an advocate of mental health awareness, in the fight for suicide prevention.

== Music career ==
MacAllister's music career commenced in 2007, yet his first release, Werewolves, was released independently, on October 1, 2009. He released an extended play, Monologues, with Come&Live! Records on November 22, 2011. His first studio album, Seasons, was released on December 11, 2012, by Come&Live Records. The subsequent album, Correspondence (A Fiction), was released independently, on November 17, 2014. MacAllister has also appeared on the Sleeping Giant album Finished People, on a track called "Violence", as well as Alex Sugg's most recent album on a track called "Braincase". He was also featured on the song "Friendly Crossfire" on Hotel Books' album Run Wild, Stay Alive, released on June 3, 2016.

== Personal life ==
Levi Macallister resides in Albuquerque, New Mexico.

== Discography ==
Albums

- Werewolves (October 1, 2009, Independent)
- Seasons (December 11, 2012, Come&Live!)
- Correspondence (A Fiction) (November 17, 2014, Independent)
- Cataracts (February 23, 2018, Independent)

EPs

- Monologues (November 22, 2011, Come&Live! Records)

Singles

- "The Beginning"/"The Separation"
- "Tetelestai"
- "Joy Seekers"
- "Anxiety"
- "It's All Worth Living For"
- "Sanctuary Cities"

== As featured artist ==
- Abraham the Poor – "Anezka"
- To Speak of Wolves – "Rearview Memories"
- Least of These – "The Son: The Kingdom"
- Sleeping Giant – "Violence"
- Glowhouse – "Braincase"
- Hotel Books – "Friendly Crossfire"
- In the Midst of Lions - "Defiance"
- My Epic - "Lower Still [remix]"
