= Kingdom Days in an Evil Age =

Studio album by Sleeping Giant
- Released: July 11, 2011
- Recorded: 2011
- Genre: Metalcore
- Length: 38:07
- Label: Ain't No Grave Records
- Producer: Eric Gregson

Sleeping Giant chronology
Sons of Thunder (2009)	Kingdom Days in an Evil Age (2011)	Finished People (2014)

Kingdom Days in an Evil Age is the third album from the Christian metalcore band, Sleeping Giant.

== Critical reception ==
Professional ratings
Review scores
Source	Rating
Indie Vision Music	4/5 stars
Jesus Freak Hideout	4.5/5 stars

Zachary Zinn writes: "Sleeping Giant does a tremendous job at keeping the songs diversified and making each one sound different and unique. It’s great to see a heavy band focus more on the Maker than breakdowns and growls. It’s a rare gem that comes highly recommended to fans of the genre." Jeremiah Holdsworth from Indie Vision Music says: "Musically this album is kicking on all cylinders. If you were a fan of Sleeping Giant before, then you will definitely be impressed with this release. If you weren’t a fan then I definitely recommend checking this one out, because this isn’t the same Sleeping Giant from the past. I also recommend getting the deluxe edition, because the three bonus tracks, are just as good, if not better, then most of the songs on the regular album."

== Track listing ==
No.	Title	Length
1.	"Throne Room Militance"	1:42
2.	"Dead Men Walking"	4:20
3.	"Eyes Wide Open" (Feat. Frankie Palmeri of Emmure)	2:44
4.	"The Cross Is Suicide"	4:35
5.	"ICXC"	2:33
6.	"Tithemi"	3:56
7.	"Tongues Of Fire"	3:16
8.	"Jehova Shalom"	2:45
9.	"The Unnamable Name"	3:29
10.	"Morning Star"	4:52
11.	"Enthroned"	6:40
Total length:		38:07

Deluxe edition bonus tracks
No.	Title	Length
12.	"Defiance"
13.	"Father to the Fatherless"
14.	"Holy is the Lamb"

== Credits ==
- J.R. Bermuda - Bass
- Geoff Brouillette - Guitar
- Thom Green - Vocals
- Eric Gregson - Guitar, Engineer, Producer
- Matthew Weir - Drums

Additional Musicians

- Frankie Palmeri (Emmure) - guest vocals on track 3

Production

- Ryan J. Downey - Management
- Andrew Glover - Drum Engineering
- Jon Kulkay - Assistant Engineer
- Ryan Nelson - Management
- Erol Ulug - Mastering, Mixing
- Dave Quiggle - Cover Art
