= From Isolation =

Studio album by Call to Preserve
- Released: September 30, 2008
- Recorded: July, 2008
- Genre: Christian hardcore, crossover thrash, metalcore
- Length: 31:22
- Label: Facedown

Call to Preserve chronology
| Unsinkable (2006) | From Isolation (2008) | Life of Defiance (2010) |

From Isolation is the second studio album from Call to Preserve. Facedown Records released the album on September 30, 2008.

== Critical reception ==
Professional ratings
Review scores
| Source | Rating |
|---|---|
| AllMusic | 3.5/5 stars |
| Cross Rhythms | 7/10 squares |
| Jesus Freak Hideout | 2.5/5 stars |

Awarding the album three and a half stars from AllMusic, Cosmo Lee states, "Despite its stylistic straitjacket, this record packs a punch." Seamus Bradley, rating the album a seven out of ten for Cross Rhythms, writes, "All in all this is a solid album from a solid band." Giving the album two and a half stars at Jesus Freak Hideout, Timothy Estabrooks describes, "From Isolation is not a great album. There is very little musical creativity or variation and it drags somewhat even with its short length. However, it is also not a terrible album."

== Track listing ==
| No. | Title | Length |
|---|---|---|
| 1. | "Sinking Sun" | 3:09 |
| 2. | "So Low" | 2:26 |
| 3. | "Vices" | 3:00 |
| 4. | "Dear Galatia" | 1:36 |
| 5. | "From Isolation" | 1:39 |
| 6. | "Hindsight" | 0:47 |
| 7. | "Shameless" | 3:42 |
| 8. | "Lincoln Street" | 3:43 |
| 9. | "Waiting for Dawn" | 2:33 |
| 10. | "First Light" | 1:09 |
| 11. | "Hope for the Fallen" | 2:57 |
| 12. | "No Value" | 1:22 |
| 13. | "Open Your Eyes" | 3:19 |
| Total length: | | 31:22 |
