= Seasons (Levi the Poet album) =

Studio album by Levi the Poet
- Released: December 11, 2012
- Genre: Spoken word
- Length: 47:53
- Labels: Come&Live!

Seasons is the first studio album by Levi the Poet. Come&Live! Records released the album on December 11, 2012.

== Critical reception ==
Professional ratings
Review scores
Source	Rating
HM Magazine	4/5 stars
Indie Vision Music	4/5 stars
Jesus Freak Hideout	4.5/5 stars

Awarding the album four stars from HM Magazine, Rob Shameless states, "This record shows Levi is not afraid to take risks with what he says." Mark Rice, giving the album four and a half stars for Jesus Freak Hideout, writes, "Seasons is an absolutely brilliant piece of art from start to finish." Rating the album four stars at Indie Vision Music, Jessica Cooper describes, she "can't say enough about the creativity and uniqueness of his work, and Seasons is another great example of that." Jameson Ketchum, in reviewing the album for Substream Magazine, says, "Seasons relentlessly thieves the expanses of the listener’s emotions from beginning to end."

== Track listing ==
No.	Title	Length
1.	"Harsh Men"	3:00
2.	"Herman Melville"	2:48
3.	"The Teacher Speaks (A Time To Keep and A Time To Cast Away)"	3:56
4.	"College-Ruled Lines"	2:56
5.	"(In)consistent"	2:28
6.	"Infirmary (A Time To Plant and A Time To Pluck Up What Is Planted)"	4:43
7.	"Damned If You Do, Damned If You Don't"	3:42
8.	"Dear Pianist"	4:37
9.	"Van Morrison Will Always Remind Me of You"	4:31
10.	"Stillbirth"	3:29
11.	"A Time to Speak (and A Time to Keep Silent)"	4:17
12.	"Resentment"	5:56
13.	"Boundless"	1:30
Total length:		47:53
