= Beloved (band) =

American metal band

- Origin: Kernersville, North Carolina, U.S.
- Genres: Post-hardcore; emo; alternative rock; metalcore; melodic hardcore
- Years active: 1999–2005; 2019-present
- Labels: Solid State, Vindicated
- Members: Josh Moore; Matt Harrison; Johnny Smrdel; Dusty Redmon; Joe Musten
- Past members: John Brehm; Mitchell Britt; Shawn Dallas; Josh Deaton

Beloved is an American post-hardcore band from Kernersville, North Carolina, United States.

== History ==
Beloved formed in the fall of 1999. The original members all attended East Forsyth High School in Kernersville, NC, from 1996 to 2000. They played local shows in the surrounding areas of Kernersville, where they grew in popularity almost immediately. In 2000, they independently released their first album, ...And So It Goes. The band toured the country with bands such as Underoath, Luti-Kriss/Norma Jean, and Cool Hand Luke, including a performance at the Cornerstone Festival.

In the spring of 2001, they gained the attention of upstart label Vindicated Records, who released their next release, The Running, later that year. During this time, the band also released a limited online pre-release for The Running which included rough studio versions of the tracks "The Blue Period" and "Into Your Arms". The second track was not included on the Vindicated Records release was not commercially released until the second re-release by Solid State Records.

In 2002, the band was in the process of signing with Takehold Records. However, the owner of Takehold Records, Chad Johnson, was also negotiating the sale of the label to Tooth & Nail Records at the time.

Ultimately, Takehold was sold to Tooth & Nail and Beloved signed with Tooth & Nail's Solid State Records division. Solid State re-released their EP, The Running, for their performance at Cornerstone in the summer of 2002.

In late 2002, while on tour with Luti-Kriss /Norma Jean, they recorded the EP One Night Split, which was limited. Only a handful of copies in CD-R format were produced, and these were handed out to lucky fans at subsequent tour stops after their recording.

The following year, the band entered the studio with producer GGGarth to record their follow-up full-length album, Failure On. The band supported the album with extensive touring and another re-release of The Running with the previously recorded bonus track "Into Your Arms" in 2004.

Their farewell show took place in Winston-Salem, North Carolina on January 14, 2005. The show also featured Underoath, Classic Case, Glass Casket, and a special surprise appearance by Norma Jean. Footage of their farewell show was released as a DVD, Kiss it Goodbye. Former members of Beloved went on to play in bands such as Classic Case, Dead Poetic and The Almost.

On November 27, 2015, multiple members announced on their personal Instagram profiles a sale on Beloved merchandise. Bassist Johnny Smirdel stated that fans should keep their ears open for 2016, hinting a possible reunion. It was revealed Nov. 29th 2019 via the band's Instagram that they were together working on something for 2020, starting with the band's first show in 15 years at Furnace Fest 2020.

In September 2021 they released a new single 'Abyss'.

== Other projects ==
- Joe Musten is currently the vocalist for Advent and Torn. More recently in 2009, he joined Dusty Redmon as the drummer for The Almost.
- Johnny Smrdel also played in Advent.
- Matt Harrison was also in Advent for a period of time, but has since stepped down from playing guitar the band,.
- Josh Moore has solo projects.
- Dusty Redmon plays guitar in The Almost. He also played for Dead Poetic.

== Members ==
Current

- Josh Moore – clean vocals, guitar (1999–2005, 2019–present)
- Matt Harrison – guitar
- Johnny Smrdel – bass (2001–2005, 2019–present)
- Dusty Redmon – guitar (1999–2005, 2019–present)
- Joe Musten – unclean vocals, drums (1999–2005, 2019–present)

Former members

- John Brehm – bass (1999)
- Mitchell Britt – bass (1999-2001)
- Shawn Dallas – guitar (1999)
- Josh Deaton – guitar (1999)

== Discography ==
- Garage Demos – 1999 – independent recording (unreleased)
- ...And So It Goes – 2000 – independent release
- The Running Pre-Release Sampler – 2001 – independent recording (internet promotional exclusive)
- The Running – 2001 – Vindicated Records
- One Night Split (with Luti-Kriss) – 2002 – independently recorded and distributed (limited release)
- Failure On – 2003 – Solid State Records / Broken Circles Records (vinyl version): Broken Circles Records
- The Running (reissue) – 2004 – Solid State Records
- Beloved Live at Cat's Cradle – 2004 – live album
- Kiss It Goodbye: The Final Show (DVD) – 2005 – Solid State Records
