= Impending Doom =

American Christian deathcore band

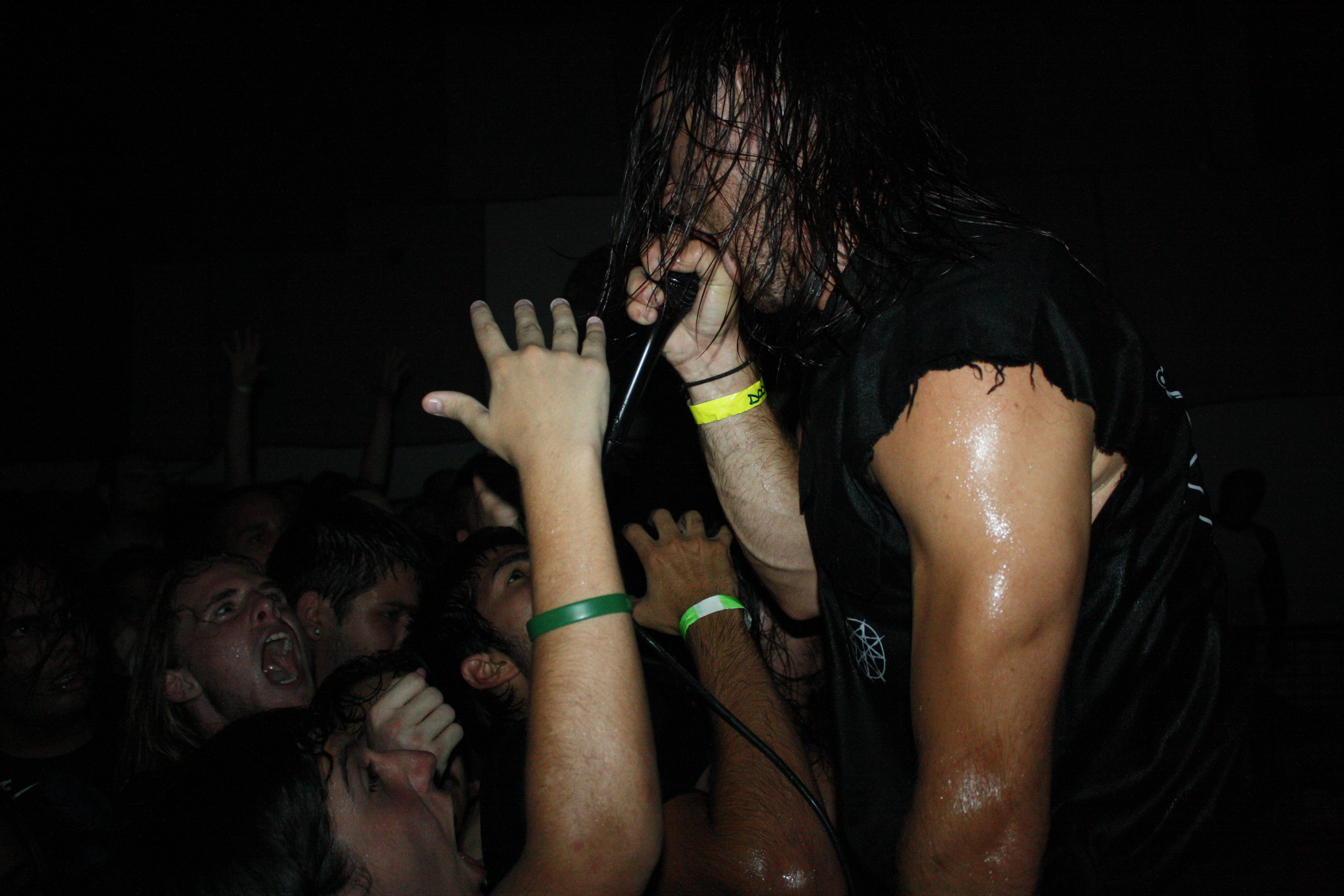
- Vocalist Brook Reeves in 2009

Background information
- Origin: Riverside, California, U.S.
- Genres: Deathcore, Christian metal, brutal death metal (early)
- Years active: 2005–present
- Labels: Facedown, eOne, Siege of Amida
- Members: Brook Reeves; David Sittig; Manny Contreras; Andrew Holzbaur
- Past members: Jon Alfaro; Chris Forno; Greg Pewthers; Andy Hegg; Chad Blackwell; Isaac Bueno; Cory Johnson; Brandon "B-Town" Trahan; Eric Correa
- Website: Impending Doom on Facebook

Impending Doom is an American Christian deathcore band from Riverside, California. The group has released six full-length studio albums, and consists of Brook Reeves (vocals), Manny Contreras (guitars), David Sittig (bass) and Andrew Holzbaur (drums). Reeves and Contreras are the only two remaining original members. The band refers to their style as "gorship", a portmanteau of gore and worship.

== History ==
Guitarist Manny Contreras and vocalist Brook Reeves started Impending Doom on October 31, 2005.

The group signed to Facedown Records in January 2007. Their debut release for the label, Nailed. Dead. Risen., reached number 46 on the Billboard Top Heatseekers chart. The record has received generally positive reviews. The band started a street team to promote their music, which can be found on their Myspace top 8. The group toured the United States to support the album in autumn 2007, including dates with Dead to Fall, Winds of Plague and With Dead Hands Rising.

Impending Doom released their second album, The Serpent Servant, on March 31, 2009, which hit number 3 on the Billboard Top Heatseekers chart.

Baptized in Filth was produced by Andreas Magnusson, who produced Oh, Sleeper's album Children of Fire, and was mixed by Machine. The album focuses on God, Satan and Number of the beast. The first single was "For the Wicked" and the first video was "Murderer". A few months after the release of Baptized in Filth, Cory Johnson was fired from the band and replaced with former founding member Manny Contreras, who had become a member of Oblige (later known as The Devastated) during his time off from Impending Doom. Johnson joined fellow Christian metal band MyChildren MyBride.

Lead vocalist Brook Reeves performed at the Mitch Lucker Memorial Show on December 21, 2012, with Suicide Silence in honor of their deceased vocalist, Mitch Lucker, who died on November 1, 2012. Reeves performed the song "Ending Is the Beginning", off the 2005 Suicide Silence. On February 26, 2013, Reeves was featured on the single "Efforts to Outcomes" by Demise.

The band confirmed that their album Death Will Reign would be released through eOne Music on November 5, 2013.

In 2016, the first Impending Doom show in three years took place at the Facedown Fest 2016 on May 14, 2016, in Pomona, California. The band performed at Facedown Fest 2017.

Their song "Murderer" was included on the Killing Floor 2 soundtrack.

On February 24, 2019, Brandon "B-Town" Trahan announced his departure from the band and that Andrew Holzbaur would take over.

The EP Hellbent, which Will Putney mixed, mastered, and produced, was announced to be released on January 14, 2022, but was instead surprised-released early on digital platforms on October 29, 2021. On July 19, 2022, the band posted on social media that they were working on a follow-up to Hellbent, with Reeves stating they hoped to release it "sooner rather than later."

On November 6, 2023, the band released the song "Eternal", along with the announcement of the EP Last Days, released on November 20, 2023, as their first independent recording.

The band announced the release of the singles "Christ Is King" and "Punishment" on January 3, 2025, preceding the EP Towards the Light, released on February 7, 2025.

In August 25, 2025, the band posted on their social media platforms that they would begin recording their first full-length album since 2018. In February 2026, the band released the single "Holy Death", followed by a second single titled "Glory & Immortality" in April. On November 5th, 2026, the band, alongside a third single "Nothing Will Remain", announced their album At the Throne of God, set for wider release on February 5th, 2027 with digital copies currently available for early access on their website.

== Musical style and influences ==
Impending Doom performs deathcore, which is a fusion between death metal and metalcore. They are influenced by death metal, grindcore, hardcore punk and nu metal. The band refers to their style of music as "Gorship", which is described by Reeves as "Worshiping God through our gore-sounding music".

The band has stated that they are influenced from groups such as Deftones, Korn, Slipknot, Lamb of God, Nile, Aborted, Guttural Secrete, Origin, Despised Icon and Ion Dissonance. In various interviews, the band members have stated they draw influences from bands such as Meshuggah, Nine Inch Nails, Radiohead, Napalm Death, Suffocation, Metallica, Cannibal Corpse, The Acacia Strain, As I Lay Dying, Killswitch Engage, Converge, Morbid Angel, August Burns Red and many other bands.

In an interview Metalriot.com, Brook Reeves has said he is influenced by Underoath, Living Sacrifice, Advent, Sinai Beach, Aborted, Cattle Decapitation, Septicflesh, and many other underground death metal bands.

== Band members ==
Current

- Brook Reeves – vocals (2005–present)
- David Sittig – bass (2006–present)
- Manny Contreras – lead guitar (2005–2010, 2012–present); rhythm guitar (2021–present); bass (2005)
- Andrew Holzbaur – drums (2019–present)

Former

- Jon Alfaro – bass (2005–2006)
- Chris Forno – rhythm guitar (2005–2007); lead guitar (2006–2007); bass (2005)
- Greg Pewthers – rhythm guitar (2006–2008)
- Andy Hegg – drums (2007–2008)
- Chad Blackwell – drums (2008–2009)
- Isaac Bueno – drums (2005–2007, 2009)
- Cory Johnson – rhythm guitar (2008–2012); lead guitar (2010–2012)
- Brandon "B-Town" Trahan – drums (2009–2019)
- Eric Correa – rhythm guitar (2012–2021)

Touring

- Jake Foust – rhythm guitar (2010)
- Phil Dubois-Coyne – drums (2011)
- Tobey Lundberg – rhythm guitar (2022–present)

== Discography ==
=== Studio albums ===
List of studio albums, with selected chart positions
Title	Album details	Peak chart positions				
Title	Album details	US	US Indie.	US Rock	US Hard Rock	US Christ.
Nailed. Dead. Risen.	Released: September 4, 2007; Label: Facedown; Formats: CD, digital download	— (Note: Nailed. Dead. Risen. did not enter the Billboard 200, but peaked at No. 46 on the Billboard Top Heatseekers)	—	—	—	—
The Serpent Servant	Released: March 31, 2009; Label: Facedown; Formats: CD, digital download	144	19	—	25	12
There Will Be Violence	Released: July 20, 2010; Label: Facedown; Formats: CD, digital download	134	18	45	16	8
Baptized in Filth	Released: March 13, 2012; Label: eOne Music; Formats: CD, digital download	107	16	31	8	7
Death Will Reign	Released: November 5, 2013; Label: eOne Music; Formats: CD, digital download	116	18	26	9	6
The Sin and Doom Vol. II	Released: June 22, 2018; Label: eOne Music; Formats: CD, digital download	—	—	—	—	—
At the Throne of God	Released: February 5, 2027; Label: Independent; Formats: CD, digital download	—	—	—	—	—
"—" denotes a recording that did not chart or was not released in that territory.

EPs

- The Sin and Doom of Godless Men (Demo) (2005)
- Hellbent (2021)
- Last Days (2023)
- Towards the Light (2025)

Live Recordings

- Live from Exile (2024)

Singles

- "Silence the Oppressors" (2007)
- "My Nemesis" (2007)
- "The Serpent Servant" (2009)
- "More than Conquerors" (2010)
- "Anything Goes" (2010)
- "Storming the Gates of Hell" (2010)
- "There Will Be Violence" (2010)
- "For the Wicked" (2012)
- "Murderer" (2012)
- "Deceiver" (2012)
- "Death Will Reign" (2013)
- "Doomsday" (2013)
- "The Wretched and Godless" (2018)
- "Satanic Panic" (2021)
- "Eternal" (2023)
- "In the End" (2023)
- "Christ Is King" (2025)
- "Punishment" (2025)
- "Snakes & Saints" (2025)
- "Towards the Light" (2025)
- "Holy Death" (2026)
- "Glory & Immortality" (2026)
- "Nothing Will Remain" (2026)
- "I Have Seen the Light" (2026)

Music videos

Title	Year	Director	From the album
"Silence the Oppressors"	2007	Andy Reale	Nailed. Dead. Risen.
"My Nemesis"	2008	Andy Reale	Nailed. Dead. Risen.
"More Than Conquerors"	2009	Robby Starbuck	The Serpent Servant
"There Will Be Violence"	2010	Drew Russ	There Will Be Violence
"Murderer"	2012		Baptized in Filth
"Deceiver"	2012		Baptized in Filth
"Doomsday"	2013		Death Will Reign
"Everything's Fake"	2018		The Sin and Doom Vol. II
"Paved with Bones"	2018	J.D. Butler	The Sin and Doom Vol. II
"Christ Is King"	2025	Toby Canning	Towards the Light
"Punishment"	2025	Toby Canning	Towards the Light
