= Seasoning (disambiguation) =

Seasoning is the process of imparting flavor to, or improving the flavor of, food.

Seasoning may also refer to:

- Seasoning (cookware), adding a protective coating for iron or steel cookware
- Seasoning (slavery), the period of adjustment that slave traders and slaveholders subjected African slaves to following their arrival in the Americas.
- Wood drying, also known as seasoning, which is the reduction of the moisture content of wood prior to its use
