= The Seasons (Mucha) =

1896–1900 color lithograph series by Alphonse Mucha

- Artist: Alphonse Mucha
- Year: 1896, 1897, 1900
- Medium: Color lithograph

The Seasons or Four Seasons is the name of three different color lithograph series produced by Czech visual artist Alphonse Mucha. They were produced in 1896, 1897, and 1900.

== Background ==
In 1895, Mucha produced the poster for Gismonda, a play starring Sarah Bernhardt. Bernhardt highly admired Mucha's work, commissioning a six-year contract with him. The style employed in Gismonda, le style Mucha, became a sensation in Paris and became known as the Art Nouveau movement.

Following Gismonda, Mucha attained an influx of work. He was shortly thereafter commissioned by F. Champenois, a wealthy patron and Paris-based printer. While working with Champenois, Mucha created decorative panels, or posters with text that were solely for decoration. These panels were published in large print runs.

== Composition and prints ==
Mucha's Seasons series were emblematic of his graphic works, which featured strong centered compositions and idealized and allegorical female figures in sensuous or provocative poses. Mucha's panels also bear some resemblance to Japanese woodcuts. Indeed, Mucha was influenced by Japanese art, like many other 19th- and 20th-century European artists.

The female figures in Mucha's works were "entwined in vaporous hair and light dresses inspired by nature, such as willowy foliage," as well as adorned in extravagant jewels. Mucha fills the background of these pieces with floral or abstract patterns. Natural colors and gold also help accentuate the pieces, while functional and decorative friezes often frame Mucha's illustrations. The prints of his Four Seasons series would become scarce.

== 1896 series ==
The Seasons, published in 1896, served as the first series Mucha produced during his time with Champenois. The Seasons depicted four different women in floral settings representing the seasons of the year: Winter, Spring, Summer, and Autumn. Each panel was sized 103 by 54 centimetres (41 in × 21 in).

Each of the seasons has a characteristic flair to their allegorical depictions. Spring, Summer, Autumn, and Winter are portrayed as innocent, sultry, fruitful, and frosty, respectively.

Summer is adorned with red poppies in her hair, the figure is seen leaning on a grapevine and bathing her feet in shallow water. Autumn is depicted as wearing a wreath of chrysanthemums in her brunette hair. She is also seen gathering grapes from a vine. Mucha represents Spring as a blonde figure in a translucent white dress standing under a tree and holding a lyre. Meanwhile, Winter is depicted as a figure draped in a pale green cape and sheltering from the cold, standing next to a snow-capped bush.

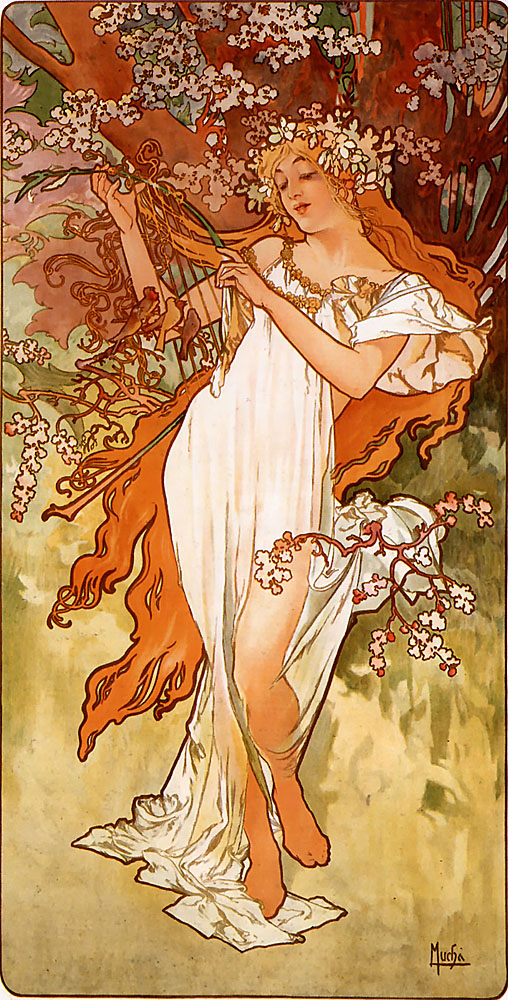
Spring (1896)

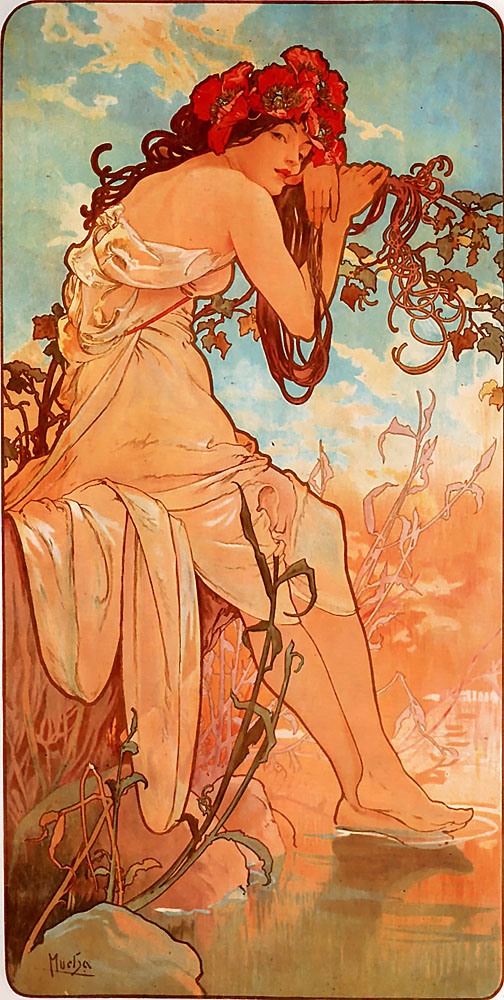
Summer (1896)

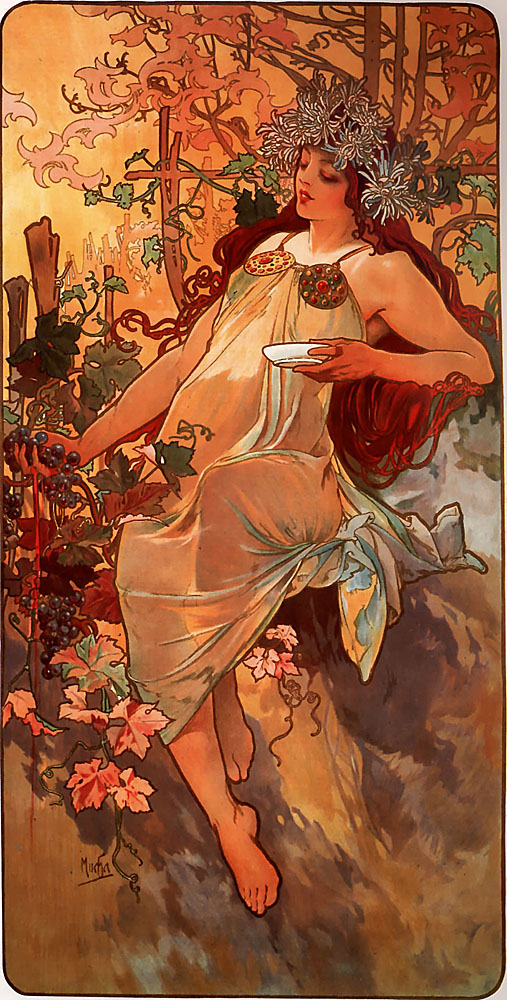
Autumn (1896)

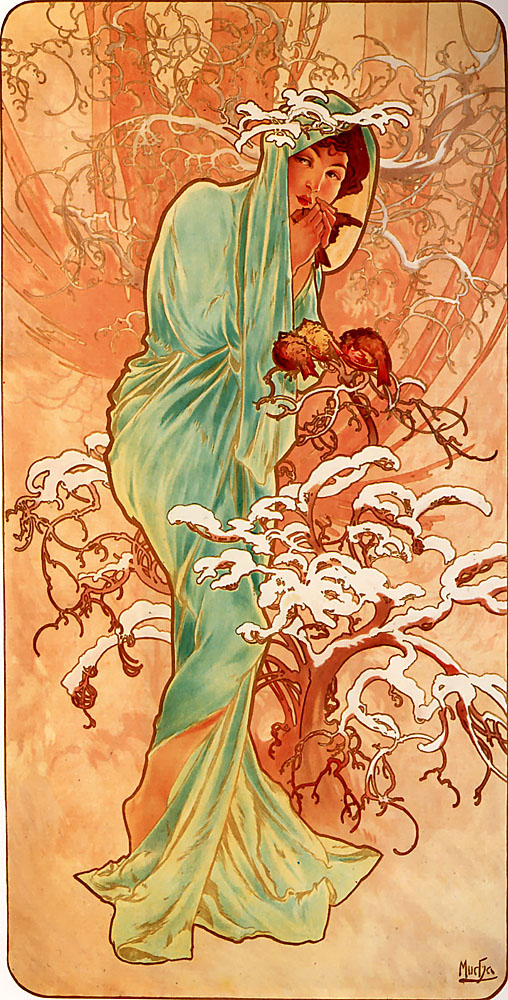
Winter (1896)

== 1897 and 1900 series ==
Due to the success of the 1896 series, Champenois asked Mucha to design two more sets based on the seasonal theme in 1897 and 1900. Designs for another two sets also exist.

The 1897 series of color lithographs on paper featured 15 by 43 centimetres (5.9 in × 16.9 in) panels and is located at the Art Institute of Chicago.

The 1900 series also features color lithographs, this time sized 54.29 by 75.88 centimetres (21.37 in × 29.87 in). The 1900 series is located at the Victoria & Albert Museum.

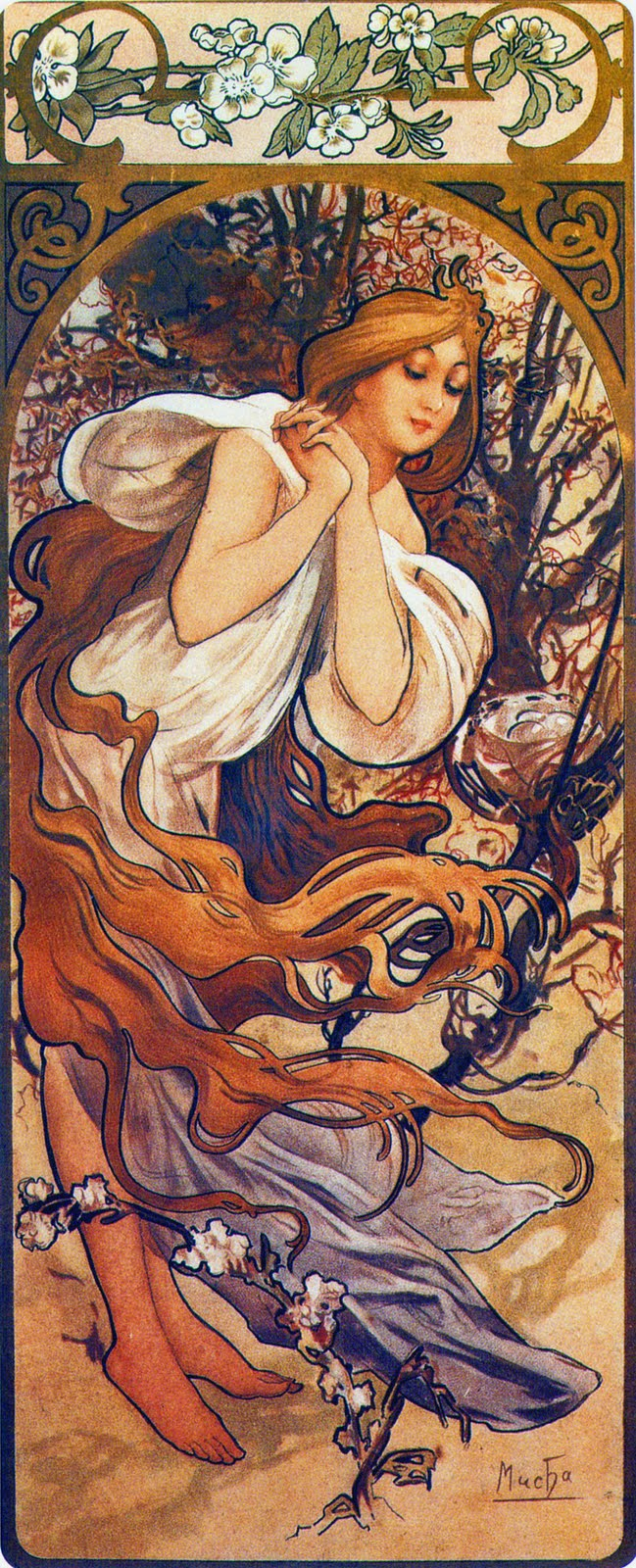
Spring (1897)

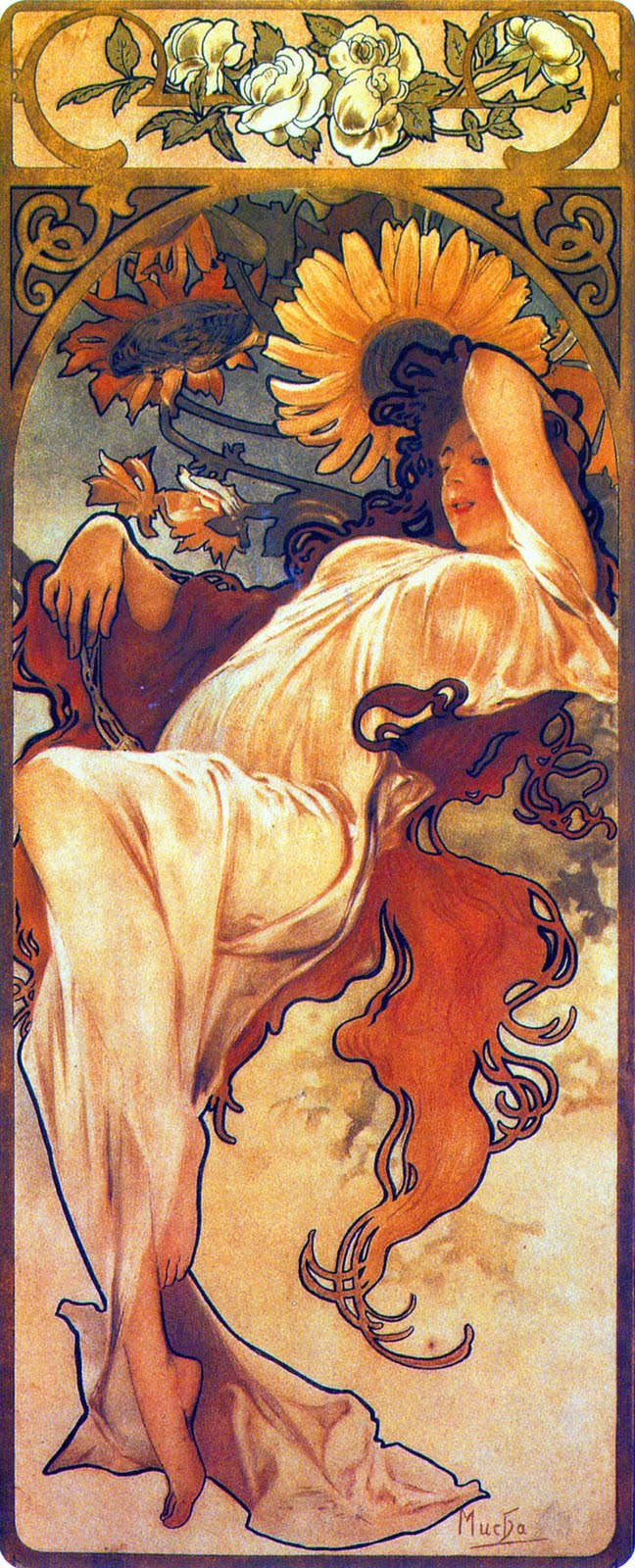
Summer (1897)

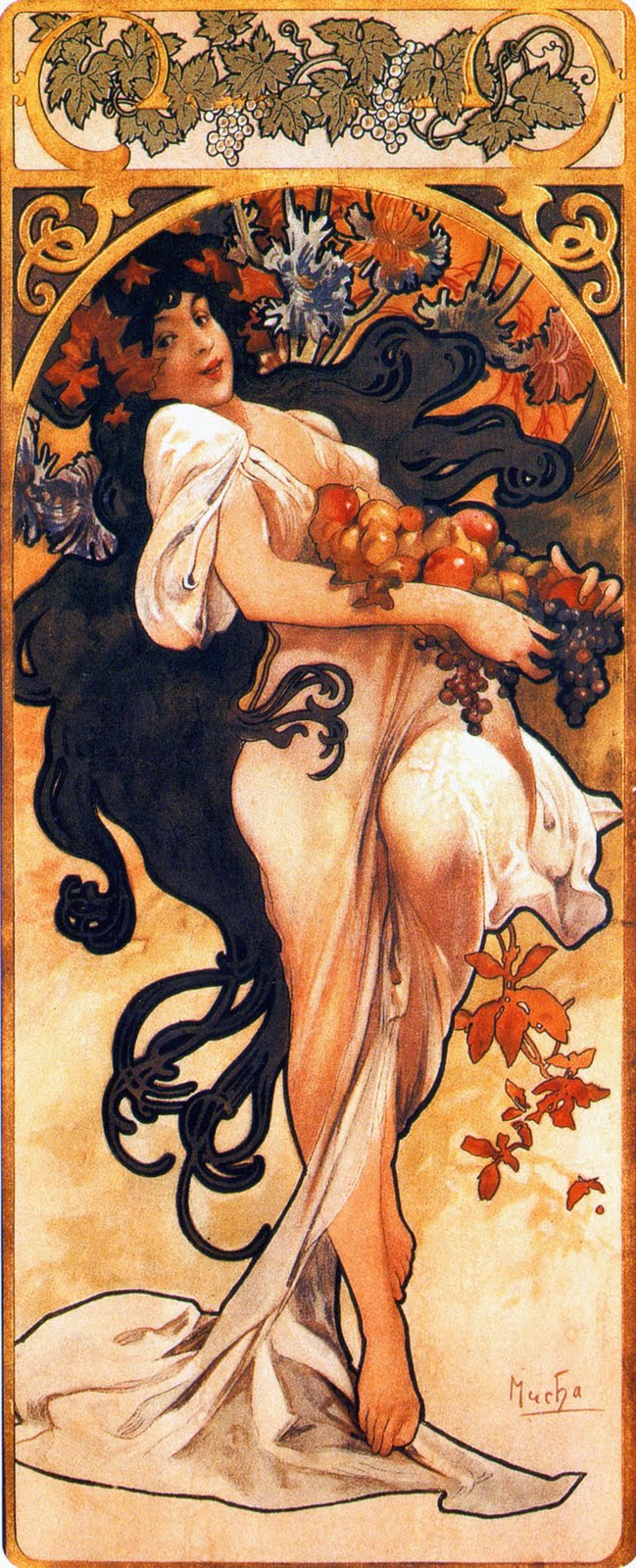
Autumn (1897)

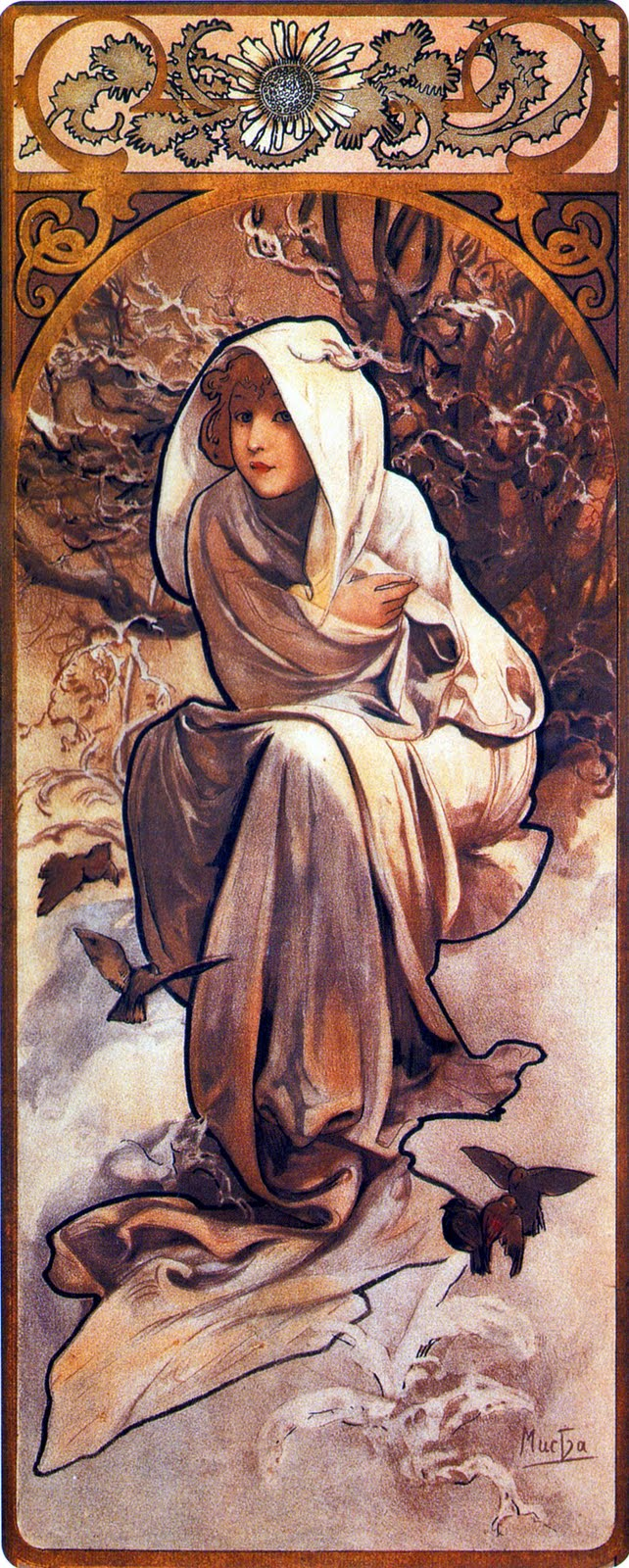
Winter (1897)
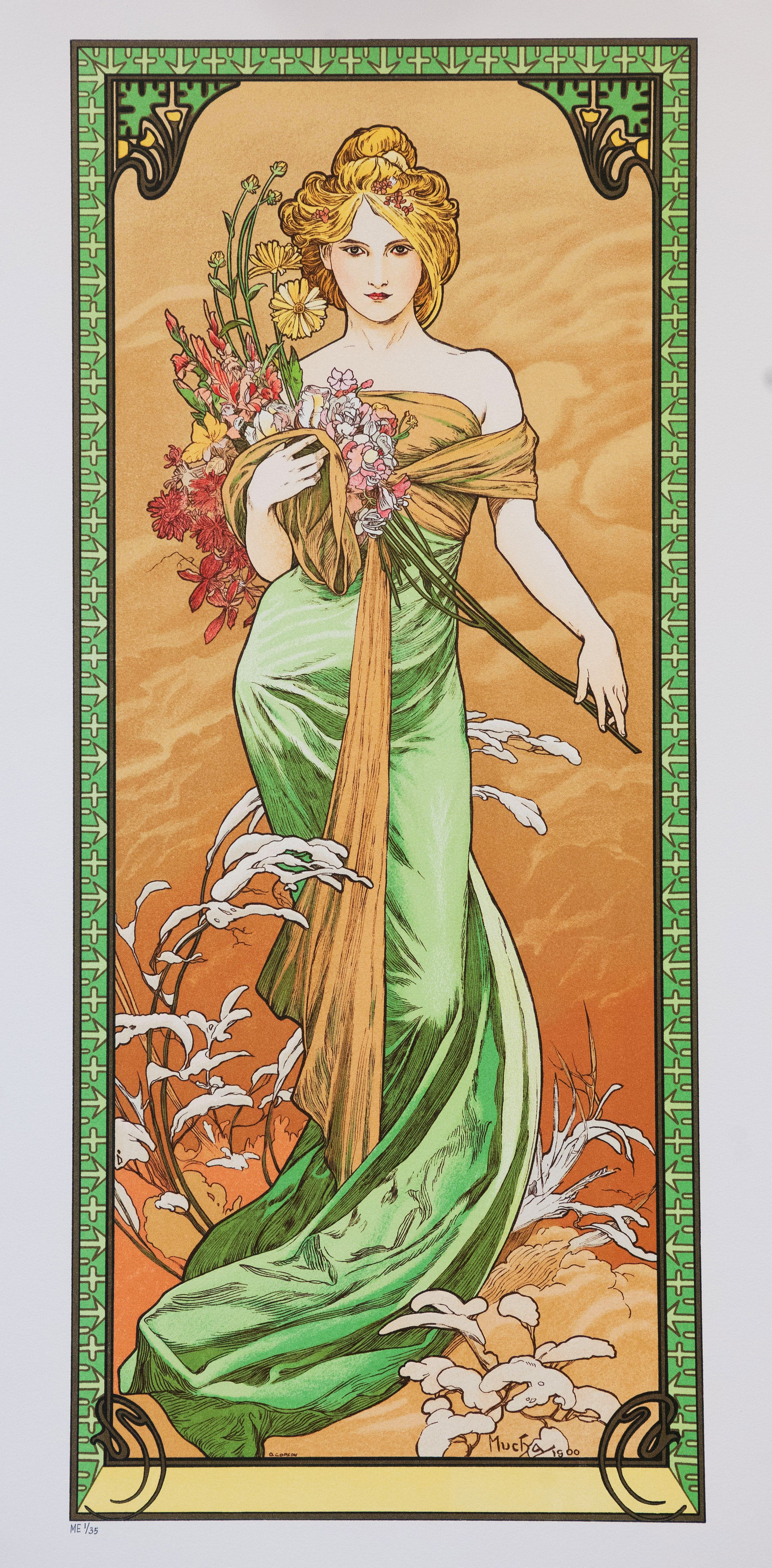
Spring (1900)

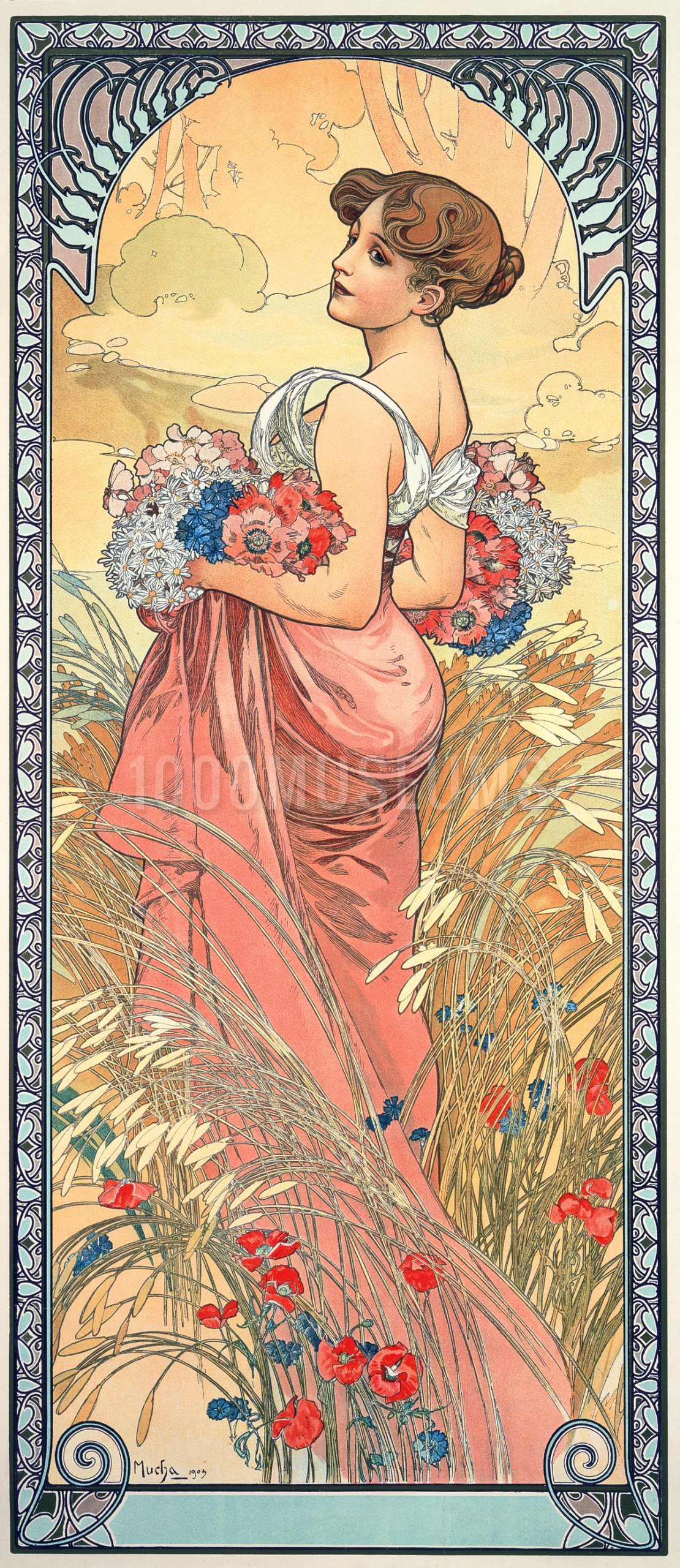
Summer (1900)

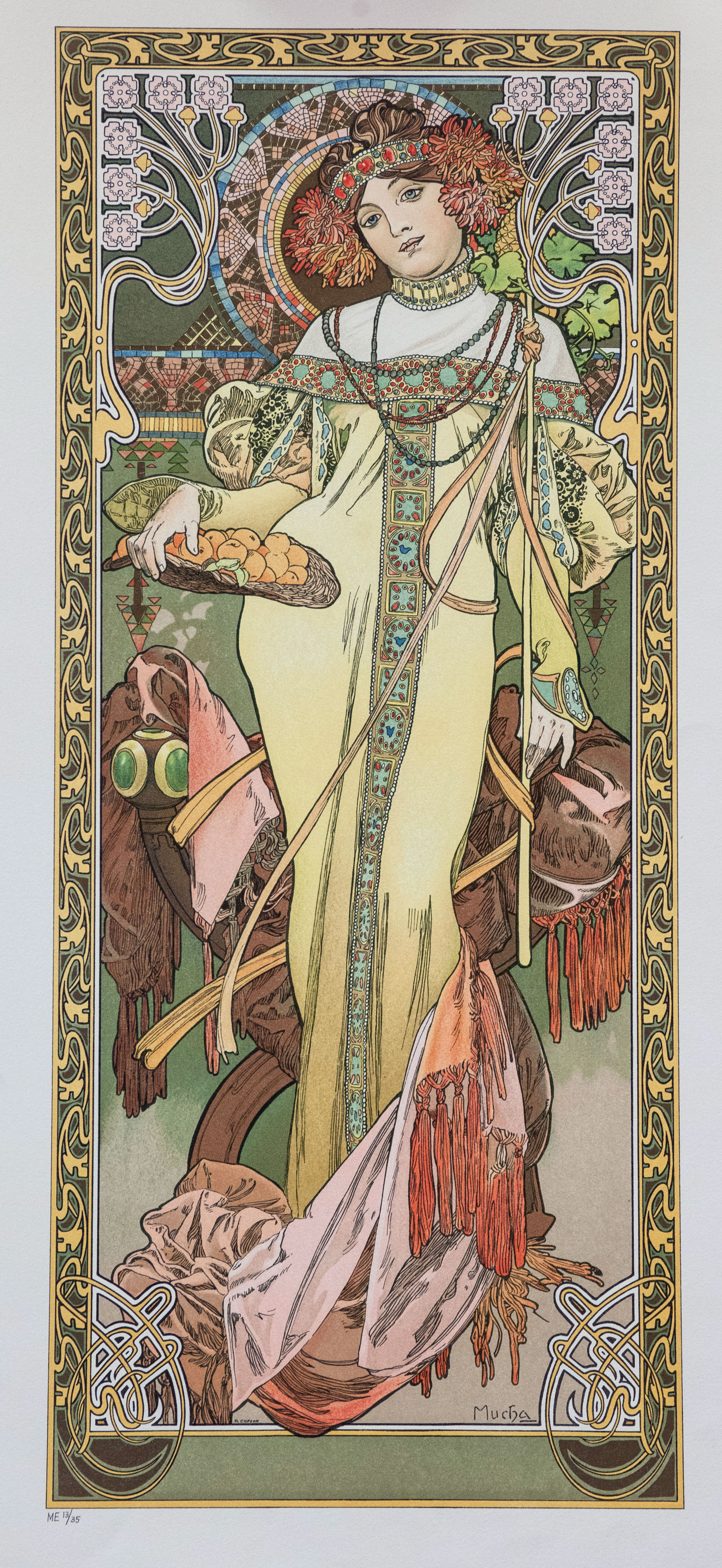
Autumn (1900)

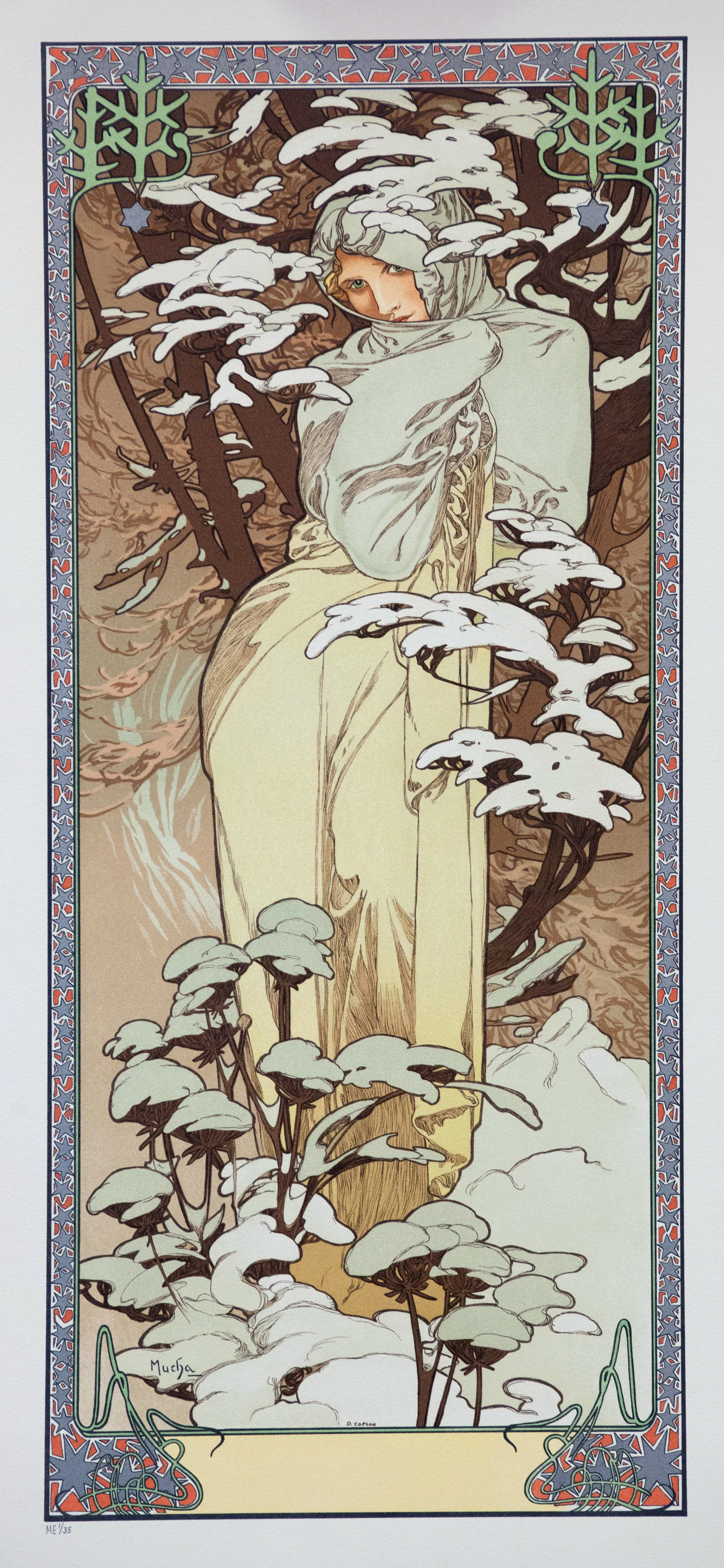
Winter (1900)
