= Advent (band) =

American hardcore band

- Origin: Kernersville, North Carolina, U.S.
- Genres: Metalcore, Christian metal, hardcore punk, Christian hardcore
- Years active: 2005–2011, 2015–present
- Labels: Solid State, Bridge 9
- Members: Joe Musten; Mike Rich; Johnny Smrdel; Jordan McGee
- Past members: Matt Harrison; Chris Ankelein
- Website: Advent on Myspace

Advent is a hardcore band from Kernersville, North Carolina. The band featured members of an earlier post-hardcore band named Beloved, and was formed in 2005 after the break of Beloved. The band had released two albums under the label Solid State Records. The band announced in July 2011 that they had disbanded, and held two final shows on September 2 and 3 in South Carolina and North Carolina, respectively. The band, as of 2015, had reunited and is releasing a new album titled, Pain and Suffering. The band has recently signed to Bridge 9. The group has been called "...one of the state's heaviest exports..."

== History ==
Advent formed in 2005 after the disbanding of Beloved. Members Joe Musten, Johnny Smrdel and Matt Harrison formed the band and added Michael Rich and Chris Ankelein. The band signed to Solid State Records soon after formation then released Remove the Earth in 2008. Harrison departed from the band soon thereafter and the band became a four-piece and performed on the "Stronger Than Hell Tour" with Demon Hunter, The Famine, Oh, Sleeper and the reunited Living Sacrifice. They released Naked and Cold in 2009 before Ankelein departed and was replaced by longtime friend Jordan McGee. On McGee's first show, Musten was not present as he was filming a music video for The Almost. The vocals were done by members of Call to Preserve, the band they were on tour with. The band played shows until 2011 when they announced their disbanding with members joining other bands or leaving for work; Musten went on with The Almost, Smrdel started a local business, Rich moved to Portland, Oregon, and McGee joined The Ember Days, Civilian and few others.

In 2015, the band reunited, but it was not announced until 2016. The band released all of their past demos from their past albums. The band later announced they were releasing a new EP, Pain and suffering, on January 27, 2017. The band later signed to Bridge 9 Records. Pain and Suffering came out on January 27, 2017 through Bridge 9, which was well received. The album's lyrical themes deal with things including the loss of Musten's father at the age 64 to a heart attack ("Shadow of Death").

== Members ==
Current

- Joe Musten (formerly of Beloved and The Almost; also in Torn) – vocals (2004–2011, 2016–present)
- Mike "Jichael" Rich – guitar (2004–2011, 2016–present)
- Johnny Smrdel – bass guitar (2004–2011, 2016–present)
- Jordan McGee – drums (2009–2011, 2016–present)

Former

- Matt Harrison – guitar (2004–2008)
- Chris Ankelein – drums (2004–2009)

Timeline

== Discography ==
Studio albums

- Remove the Earth (2008; Solid State Records)
- Naked and Cold (2009; Solid State Records)

EPs

- Pain and Suffering (2017; Bridge 9 Records)

Singles

- "Weight of the World" (2016)
- "Shadow of Death"
