= Glass Casket =

American deathcore band

- Also known as: Gadrel (2001–2004)
- Origin: Winston-Salem, North Carolina, U.S.
- Genres: Deathcore; metalcore
- Years active: 2001–present
- Labels: Silent Pendulum; Abacus
- Members: Adam Cody; Blake Richardson; Dustie Waring; Sid Menon; Wes Hauch
- Past members: Ian Tuten; Jake Troth

Glass Casket is an American deathcore band from Winston-Salem, North Carolina. Originally known as Gadrel, the band released two albums before becoming mostly inactive in 2006, as the members focused on other projects. In 2013, the band announced that they were working on new music but would not officially reform until a decade later in 2023, announcing that an EP would be released later that year.

== History ==
They were called Gadrel when they released their first demo, To Cherish a Falsity. The band formed after several members' previous band, Narayan, broke up. Blake Richardson is also a member of Between the Buried and Me while Dustie Waring is a former member, and Adam Cody is a member of metal band Wretched and grindcore band Columns. Jake Troth, who joined Glass Casket before the recording of A Desperate Man's Diary, also played in Columns but left the band in 2007.

Guitarist Dustie Waring stated on Between the Buried and Me's message board that Glass Casket was writing a new record, and were set to release it sometime in 2013, stating it would be more "brutal" than A Desperate Man's Diary. In January 2014, Glass Casket announced Wes Hauch (formerly of The Faceless) as their new guitarist.

On January 17, 2023, Silent Pendulum Records founder and CEO Michael Kadner released a brief video stating that Glass Casket had signed to the label and a new record would be released later in the year. Silent Pendulum obtained the rights to We Are Gathered Here Today and Desperate Man's Diary, and would reissue the albums on vinyl. After a decade in development hell, Glass Casket released their first new material in 17 years, a self-titled EP released on June 9, 2023. The band released the EP's lead single and their first song in 17 years, "Let Them Go", on March 16, 2023.

== Band members ==
Current

- Adam Cody – lead vocals (2001–present) (ex-Wretched, Columns, ex-Zero System, ex-Anything on Fire, ex-Vanisher, ex-Nysiis, ex-Vehemence)
- Blake Richardson – drums (2001–present) (Between the Buried and Me)
- Dustie Waring – guitars (2001–present) (ex-Between the Buried and Me)
- Sid Menon – bass, clean vocals (2002–present) (ex-Upheld, ex-Yearling)
- Wes Hauch – guitars (2014–present) (Alluvial, ex-The Faceless, ex-Black Crown Initiate)

Former

- Ian Blake Tuten – guitars (2001–2006)
- Jake Troth – guitars (2006–2013) (ex-Columns, ex-Desist, Seneca)

Timeline

== Discography ==
=== Studio albums ===
Year	Name	Label
2004	We Are Gathered Here Today	Abacus
2006	Desperate Man's Diary	Abacus

=== Extended plays ===
Year	Name	Label
2002	To Cherish a False Intent (demo)	Independent
2023	Glass Casket	Silent Pendulum

== Music videos ==
Year	Song	Album
2004	"In Between the Sheets"	We Are Gathered Here Today
