= Call to Preserve =

American crossover thrash band

- Origin: Rockledge, Florida
- Genres: Christian hardcore, metalcore
- Years active: 2003–2011, 2014
- Labels: Facedown, Strike First
- Past members: John Ellis; Matt Aviles; Harbor Partin; Kyle Bowen; Mike Aviles; Duke Ahrens
- Website: facebook.com/calltopreserve

Call to Preserve was an American Christian and straight edge crossover thrash band who played a fusion hardcore punk and metalcore. They come from Rockledge, Florida. The band started making music in 2003, and disbanded in 2011. Their membership was vocalist, John Ellis, guitarists, Duke Ahrens, Matt Aviles, and Harbor Partin, bass guitarist, Kyle Bowen, and drummer, Mike Aviles. The band released one independently made extended play, Call to Preserve, in 2003. Their first studio album, Unsinkable, was released by Strike First Records, in 2006. The subsequent studio album, From Isolation, was released by Facedown Records, in 2008. They released, Life of Defiance, with Facedown Records, in 2010, and this was final studio album. Their last release, an extended play, Validation, was released by Facedown Records, in 2011, marking this as their final musical recording.

== Background ==
Call to Preserve was a Christian hardcore, and Christian metal band, who comes from Rockledge, Florida. Their members were vocalist, John Ellis, guitarists, Duke Ahrens, Matt Aviles, and Harbor Partin, bassist, Kyle Bowen, and drummer, Mike Aviles.

== Music history ==
The band commenced as a musical entity in 2003, with their first release, Call to Preserve, an extended play, that was released independently in 2003. They released a studio album, Unsinkable, on August 8, 2006, with Strike First Records. Their second studio album, From Isolation, was released by Facedown Records on September 30, 2008. The subsequent studio album, Life of Defiance, was released by Facedown Records on June 8, 2010. They released, Validation, another extended play, with Facedown Records on July 5, 2011. This was their final release, as they disbanded in 2011.

== Members ==
Last Known Line-up

- John Ellis – vocals
- Matt Aviles – guitar, vocals
- Harbor Partin – guitar
- Kyle Bowen – bass
- Mike Aviles – drums, vocals

Past members

- Duke Ahrens – guitar

== Discography ==
Studio albums

- Unsinkable (August 8, 2006, Strike First)
- From Isolation (September 30, 2008, Facedown)
- Life of Defiance (June 8, 2010, Facedown)

Studio EPs

- Validation (July 5, 2011, Facedown)

Independent EPs

- Call to Preserve (2003, Independent)
