= Sleeping Giant (band) =

American Christian metal band

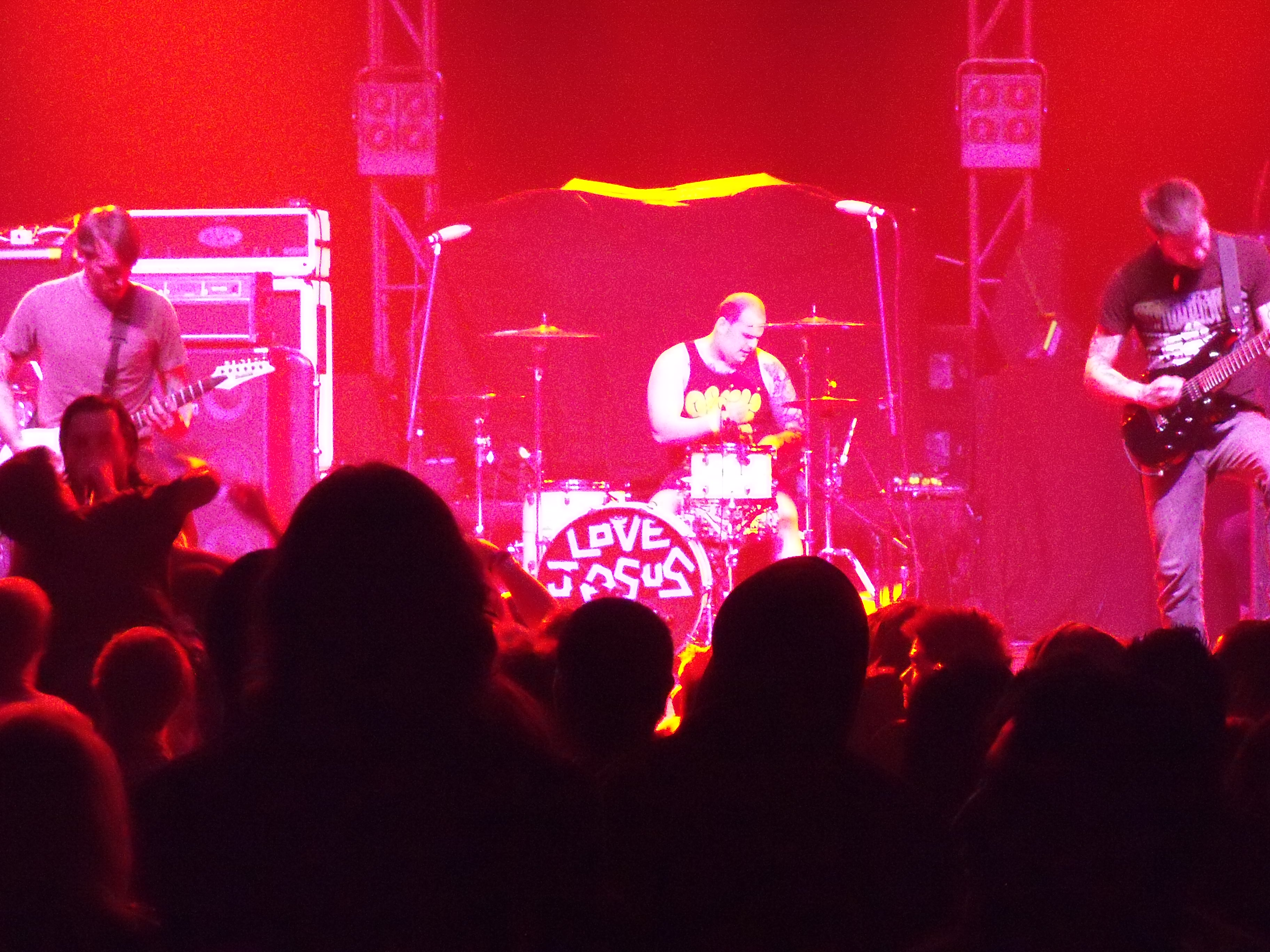
- Sleeping Giant in 2011

Background information
- Origin: Redlands, California; Salt Lake City, Utah
- Genre: Metalcore
- Years active: 2006–2018, 2026
- Labels: Century Media, Facedown, Ain't No Grave
- Spinoff of: xDEATHSTARx
- Members: Tom Green; Geoff Brouillette; Nelson Flores; Matt Weir
- Past members: Travis Boyd; J.R. Bermuda; Eric Gregson; Cory Johnson; Manny Contreras
- Website: Sleeping Giant on Facebook

Sleeping Giant is an American Christian metalcore band from Redlands, California and Salt Lake City, Utah. All the members of the band, minus drummer Matt Weir, played in the band xDEATHSTARx.

== History ==
Sleeping Giant was founded in 2006 by several members of xDeathstarx. The group released its first album, Dread Champions of the Last Days, in 2007 on Facedown. Sleeping Giant's release, Finished People, was issued on Century Media in 2014. On December 1, 2017, the band announced they returned to Facedown Records to release their final album, I Am. The band announced they would play their final show on February 17, 2018. They also released their debut single from the album, "No Love".

Tommy Green would go on to form a metalcore worship outfit titled HolyName with guitarist Joe Holt in 2021, releasing their self-titled debut in 2023 under Facedown Records.

== Members ==
Final lineup

- Tom Green – vocals (2006–2018)
- Geoff Brouillette – guitar (2006–2018), bass (2006–2009, 2013–2014)
- Eric Gregson – guitar (2009–2013, 2018)
- Andrew P. Glover – bass (2014–2018)
- J.R. Bermuda – bass (2009–2013, 2018)
- Matt Weir – drums (2010–2018)

Former

- Travis Boyd – drums (2006–2010)
- Cory Johnson – guitar (2006–2008)
- Manny Contreras – guitar (2008–2009)
- Nelson Flores – guitar (2014–2018)

Session musicians

- Tom Brady – bass (2006–2009)

Live musicians

- Lazarus Rios – bass (2016)

== Discography ==
=== Studio albums ===
List of studio albums, with selected chart positions
| Title | Album details | Peak chart positions | | | | | |
| Title | Album details | US | US Christ | US Hard | US Indie | US Rock | US Heat |
|---|---|---|---|---|---|---|---|
| Dread Champions of the Last Days | Released: May 1, 2007; Label: Facedown; CD, digital download | — | — | — | — | — | — |
| Sons of Thunder | Released: June 23, 2009; Label: Facedown; CD, digital download | — | — | — | — | — | 47 |
| Kingdom Days in an Evil Age | Released: July 11, 2011; Label: Ain't No Grave; CD, digital download | 131 | — | 12 | 27 | 39 | 2 |
| Finished People | Released: August 19, 2014; Label: Century Media; CD, digital download | — | 15 | 17 | 32 | — | 7 |
| I Am | Released: January 26, 2018; Label: Facedown; CD, digital download, vinyl | — | — | — | — | — | — |

=== Singles ===
- "No Love" (December 1, 2017; Facedown)
