= WOW Next 2007 =

Compilation album by Various artists
- Released: December 26, 2006
- Genre: Contemporary Christian music
- Label: EMI Christian Music Group

Various artists chronology
WOW Next 2007	WOW New & Next

Professional ratings
Review scores
Source	Rating
Allmusic	3/5 stars

WOW Next 2007 is an album in the WOW series, comprising twelve top Contemporary Christian music songs on one album. It was given free with any WOW purchase.

== Track listing ==
Disc One
No.	Title	Writer(s)	Artist (Album)	Length
1.	"Our God Reigns"	Brandon Heath	Brandon Heath (Don't Get Comfortable)	4:06
2.	"Jamie's Song"	David Leonard, Craig Wilson	Jackson Waters (Come Undone)	4:18
3.	"Jesus to the World"	This Beautiful Republic, Allen Salmon	This Beautiful Republic (Even Heroes Need a Parachute)	3:32
4.	"Indestructible"	Britt Nicole, Joe Pangallo, Adam Smith	Britt Nicole (WOW Next 2007)	3:38
5.	"The Blessing" (featuring Mark Hall)	John Waller	John Waller (The Blessing)	4:04
6.	"As Long As I Have You"	Mark Roach	Mark Roach (Every Reason Why)	3:58
7.	"It's You"	Justin Cox, Glenn Drennen, Wendy Drennen, Ian Eskelin, Dawn Richardson, Phee Shorb	Fireflight (The Healing of Harms)	3:13
8.	"When It's Over"	Adrienne Camp, Jeremy Camp	Adie (Don't Wait)	3:56
9.	"A Lot In Common"	Arthur Anderson, Blanca Reyes, Jose Reyes, Pablo Villatoro	Group 1 Crew (Group 1 Crew)	4:01
10.	"Lost At Sea"	Jimmy Needham	Jimmy Needham (Speak)	3:57
11.	"The Real"	Kevin Kadish, Joshua Pearson	Nevertheless (Live Like We're Alive)	3:30
12.	"Live My Life for You"	Barry Weeks, Brian White	PureNRG (PureNRG)	3:23
Total length:				45:36
