= Just You and Me (disambiguation) =

"Just You 'n' Me" is a 1973 song by Chicago.

Just You and Me may refer to:

- Just You and Me (album), by Adie, 2010
- Just You and Me, a 1976 album by Herb Alpert
- "Just You and Me", a 1980 song by Paul Jabara from The Third Album
- "Just You and Me", a 1975 song by Tamiko Jones
- "Just You and Me", a 1981 song by the Birthday Party from Prayers on Fire

== See also ==
- Just Me and You (1978 film), an American television film
- Just Me and You (2019 film), a Canadian film
- Just You, Just Me, a 1953 album by Lester Young
