= Aaron Gillespie =

American musician

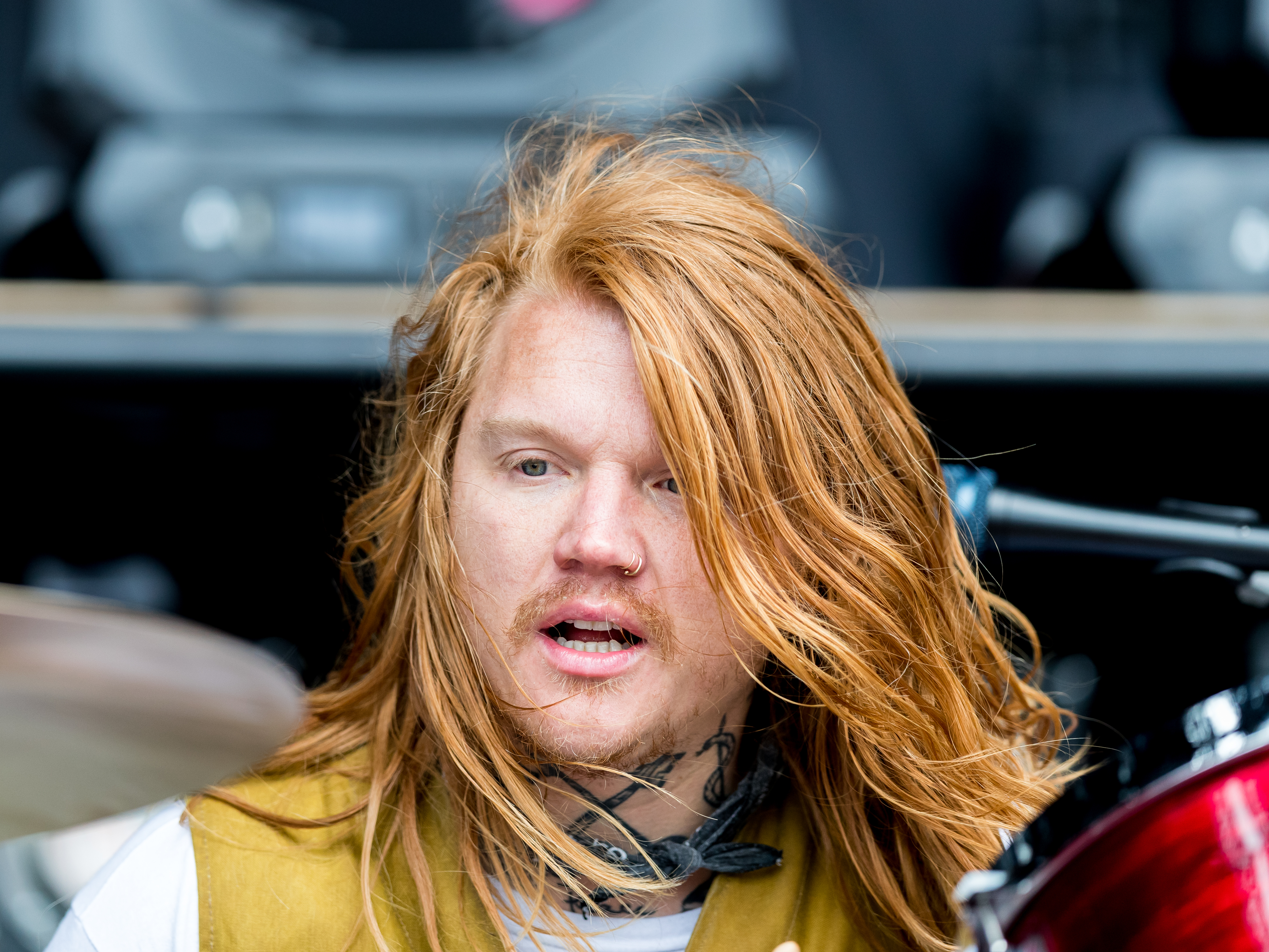
- Gillespie at Rock am Ring 2019

Background information
- Born: Aaron Roderick Gillespie; July 18, 1983 (age 43); Clearwater, Florida, U.S.
- Genres: Metalcore; post-hardcore; alternative rock; emo; screamo; indie rock; Christian metal
- Occupations: Musician; singer
- Instruments: Drums; vocals; guitar; piano
- Years active: 1997–present
- Labels: Tooth & Nail; Solid State; Virgin; BEC
- Member of: Underoath; The Almost
- Website: aarongillespie.com

Aaron Roderick Gillespie (born July 18, 1983) is an American musician, best known for being the drummer and clean vocalist for the rock band Underoath, of which he is the only original member. He is also the lead singer and rhythm guitarist for the alternative rock band The Almost. He has also worked with the band The Dangerous Summer. Gillespie also maintains his own solo project and released his debut full-length album, Anthem Song, in 2011. From 2013 to 2016, he was the touring drummer for Paramore.

In 2023, Jake Richardson of Loudwire included him in his list of the "10 Best Clean Singers in Metalcore".

== Background ==
Aaron Roderick Gillespie was born on July 18, 1983, in Clearwater, Florida. Ever since he was born, he has been nearly blind in his left eye. He grew up in a devout Christian family, attended private schools, and went to church regularly. Gillespie's parents divorced when he was 18.

At age 14, Gillespie worked at the church and vacuumed for $60 a week. He enjoyed playing the drums at church, but was told that he did not play well and that he played too loud. However, one of the leaders in the church came up to him and said that he believed Gillespie would "travel the whole world playing drums". At this time, he received a call from Underoath asking him to play drums for them.

In 2008, he achieved the HM magazine's Readers Award for "favorite drummer", along with his bandmate Timothy McTague who received "favorite guitarist" of 2008. He was one of the preaching pastors at Unveiled Church based in the Tampa Bay area of Florida.

Aaron and his former wife ran a clothing label, Pig Cloth.

Gillespie left Underoath after a European tour in 2010 but later rejoined the band.

Gillespie did guest vocals on the song "All About Us" by indie pop band He Is We, which was released on the album "My Forever" on November 23, 2010.

Gillespie has discussed his issues with hypochondria and generalized anxiety disorder, stating that they played into his departure from Underoath.

== Musical career ==
=== Underoath ===
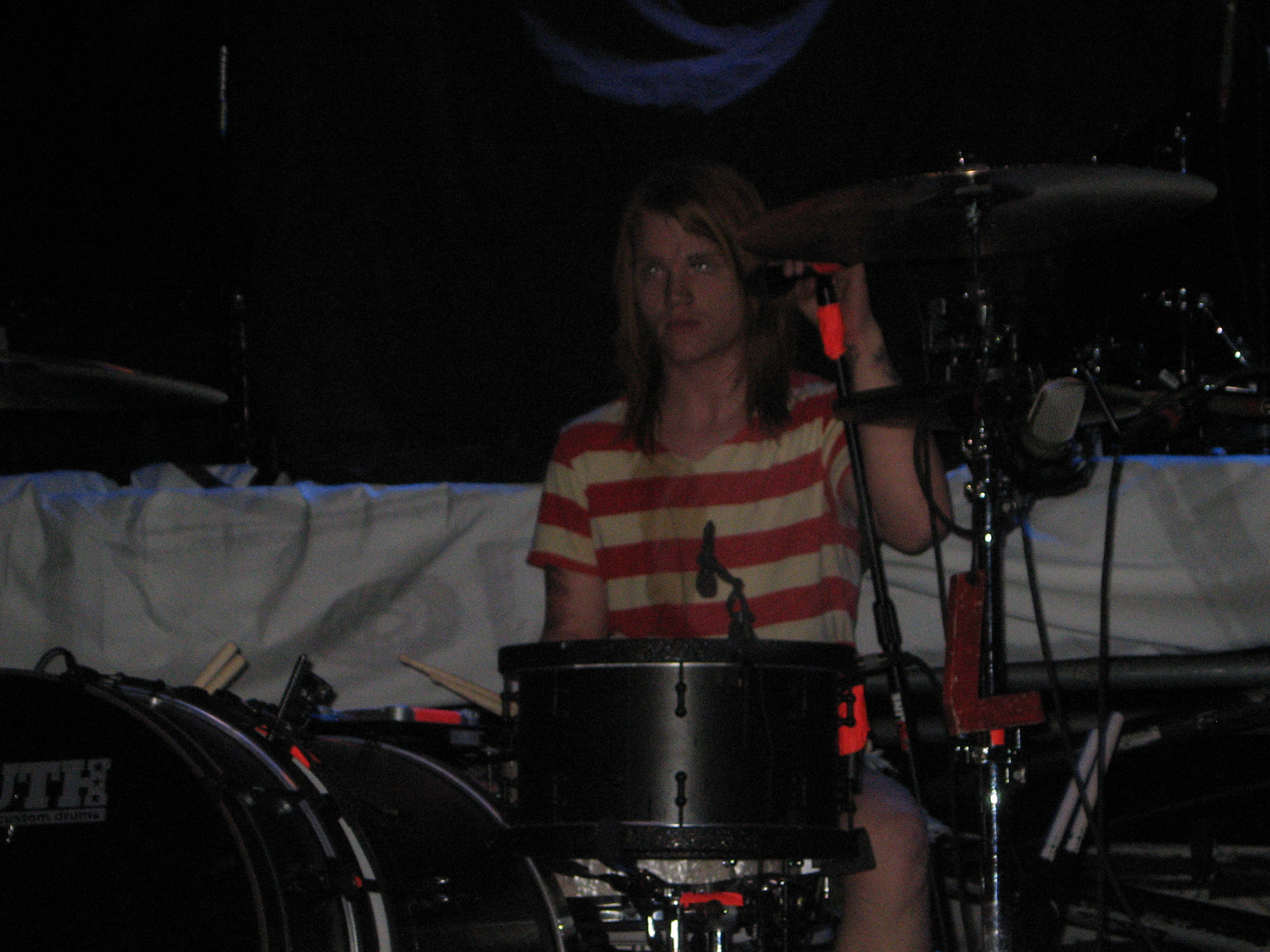
Gillespie performing as a part of Underoath during their 2007 winter tour

Gillespie had performed on every Underoath release before Ø (Disambiguation) and first began to add clean vocals on Underoath's third album The Changing of Times, which shifted Underoath's original extreme metal music style into a more straightforward metalcore sound and was released in 2002. After lead vocalist Dallas Taylor parted with the band, Spencer Chamberlain joined and the band began to change its style of music even more.

Most of the lyrics on the album They're Only Chasing Safety are written by Gillespie and are about him ending a four-year relationship. He stated to Alternative Press, "I think I would've died if we didn't write those songs. I thought I had ruined someone's life. It's hard to explain, but you can't just pretend that things are great and go on and get married." The follow-up to They're Only Chasing Safety, Define the Great Line was released on June 20, 2006, it debuted at No. 2 on the Billboard 200 selling over 98,000 copies in its first week, the record was certified Gold by the RIAA on November 11, 2006, representing 500,000 shipped units of the album.

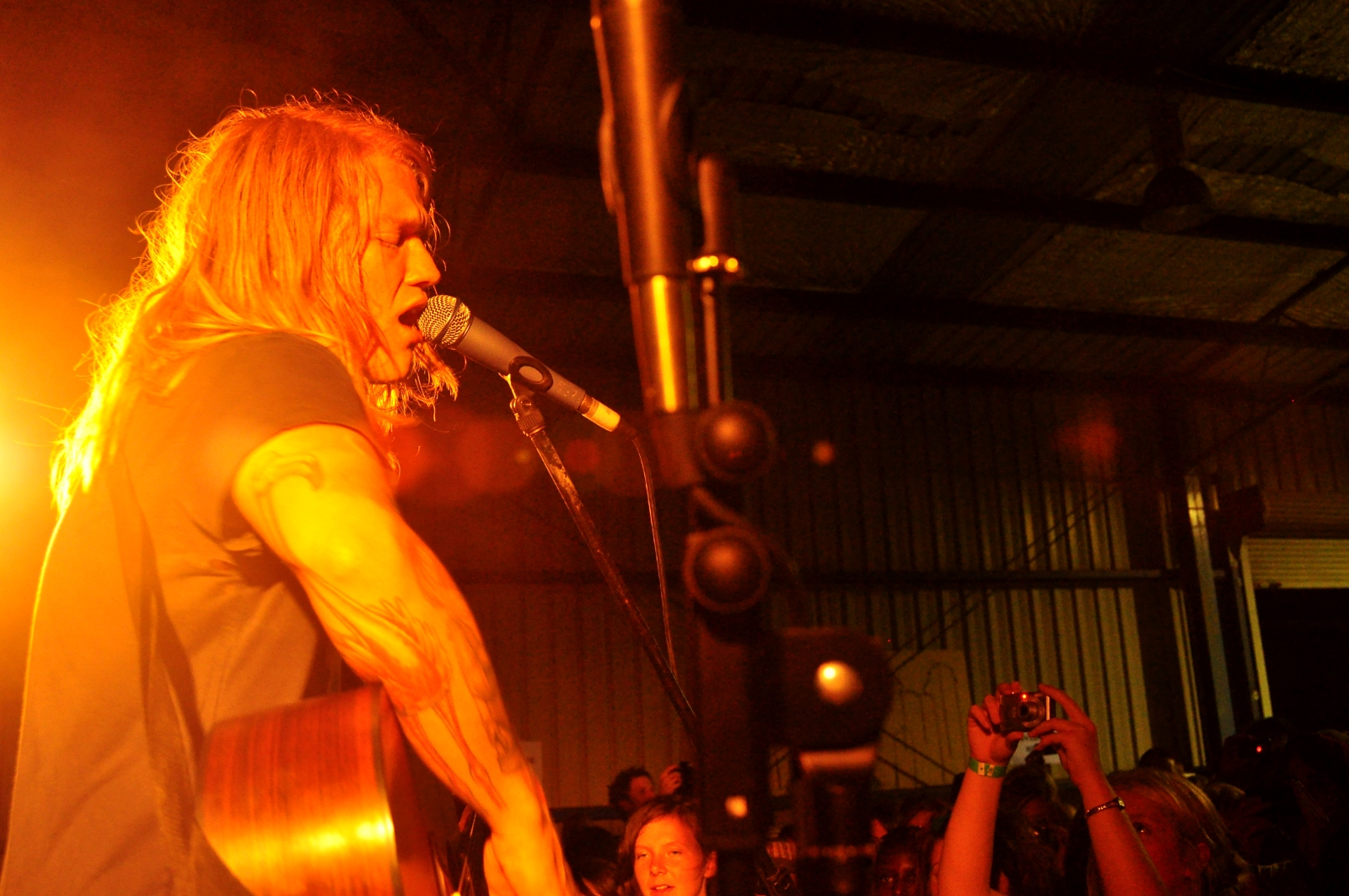
Gillespie performing in Australia in 2010

On April 5, 2010, Underoath announced that the band and Gillespie had agreed to mutually part ways pending the end of their European tour. On the same day, Gillespie posted a message on his personal blog. On August 17, 2015, in an interview article for Alternative Press, Chamberlain and Gillespie confirmed that the band was reuniting.

=== The Almost ===
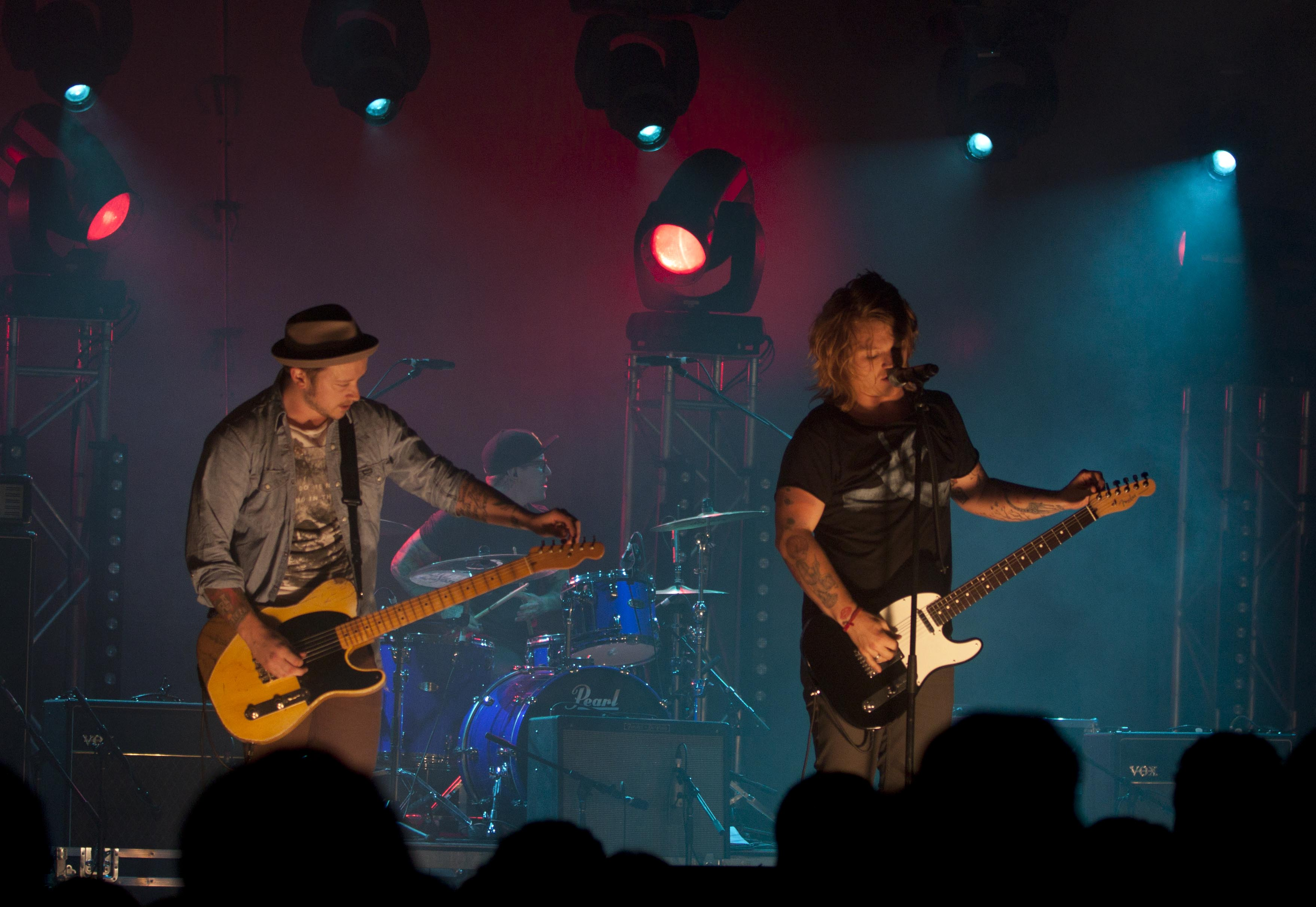
Gillespie performing with the Almost in Sydney's "Big Exo Day" 2011

Gillespie performed lead vocals for the alternative rock band the Almost. The band's debut album Southern Weather was released on April 3, 2007, along with their first single, "Say This Sooner". The single reached a peak of No. 7 on the Billboard's US Modern Rock Charts. Gillespie recorded every instrument on the Southern Weather album except for bass on a couple of tracks, with which Kenny Vasoli from The Starting Line helped.

On November 24, 2008, the Almost released an EP, No Gift to Bring.

On October 6, 2009, they released another EP, Monster EP. On November 3, 2009, they released their second album, Monster Monster, in which the rest of the bandmates were more incorporated in the writing and recording processes.

On June 11, 2013, the band released their third full-length album, Fear Inside Our Bones.

In an interview released on February 8, 2015, on Emery's BadChristian podcast, Gillespie stated that he had placed lower priority on the band, citing his "busy schedule" (as Paramore's touring drummer, a solo artist and producer) and the "busy schedules" of the other band members.

On September 24, 2019, they announced a fourth full-length album, Fear Caller, to be released on October 18, 2019, then released, "Chokehold", with an accompanying music video as part of the announcement.

=== Solo work ===
Shortly after leaving Underoath, Gillespie announced that he was working on a worship-based solo project. He went to The Compound recording studio in Seattle on June 28, 2010, to record the album that would eventually be released in March 2011. On his Twitter account on July 24, he posted "Finished my record. So great to be a part of it. Goodnight." Gillespie's solo album Anthem Song was released on March 8, 2011. It debuted at number 90 on the Billboard 200.

"Anthem Song" was Gillespie's revisit to his musical beginning, which began in worship. In an interview with CBN.com, Gillespie recounted the experience and how a trip to Africa helped shape Anthem Song. He stated "I saw people worshiping God because He exists, because that's what we were created to do. I believe everybody worships something, whether it be your job or your family or a relationship or whatever. We were all made to worship just one, and that's Jesus. And it really, really messed me up, seeing these African people who have nothing worshiping God, just because He exists. It gave me the fuel to go and do this record and also convicted me to leave Underoath and to pursue this ministry area in my life."

On February 3, 2015, he released his second worship album, Grace Through the Wandering. The record was made on the road while touring with Paramore and was produced by Paramore's touring key player, John.

In 2016, Gillespie released the self-produced Out of the Badlands. Gillespie and his studio partner, Andrew Goldring, made the record at Gillespie's Salt Lake City studio, Soundcave. Goldring engineered, mixed and performed on the record. The album is a departure from his former worship record and instead focuses on his personal grieving and honesty.

=== Paramore ===
On August 26, 2013, Gillespie was officially announced as the new touring drummer for Paramore, after their previous touring drummer, Miles McPherson, suffered from an injury. He was to remain only for their duration of The Self-Titled Tour's European dates, but later remained for the duration of their North American fall tour of that year, as well as the Australian and New Zealand legs of the tour. Gillespie stayed in the Paramore touring line-up for the next few years, playing drums on the Monumentour (Paramore's co-headlining tour with the band Fall Out Boy in 2014) and the Writing the Future Tour (in 2015), along with two of the band's "Parahoy!" Cruises — the first one (in March 2014) and the second one (in March 2016). However, in February 2016, Gillespie clarified that his role in Paramore doesn't extend beyond live performances and that he isn't involved in the songwriting/recording process with the band. With the reinstatement of Paramore's original drummer and with the reunion of Underoath, Gillespie is now back with Underoath full-time.

== Producer ==
Aaron Gillespie operated as a producer out of Soundcave Studios from 2015 to 2017. Alongside singer-songwriter, producer, and engineer Andrew Goldring, Gillespie worked on productions, most notably, Gillespie's solo record, "Out of the Badlands". Goldring also engineered, mixed and performed various instruments on the record.

Other examples of Gillespie's producer credits include Collington's, We Swim in Seas that Never Rest. Gillespie produced the record, played drums and did other various session work with Goldring and Collington. The album was debuted by Relevant Magazine on their series "The Drop". Gillespie and Collington crossed paths when Collington was opening for Aaron Gillespie in Boston. Taking a liking to Collington's music, Gillespie invited Collington to Salt Lake City to create a record. Collington originally laughed at the offer thinking it was a joke.

== Emergency surgery ==
While on tour with Underoath in 2007 in Las Vegas, Nevada, Gillespie underwent emergency surgery due to an infected thumb. Instead of canceling shows, Underoath recruited Kenny Bozich, former drummer of The Almost, to fill in on drums. Spencer Chamberlain and Timothy McTague shared duties in singing his vocal parts.

== Discography ==
With Underoath

- Act of Depression – 1999
- Cries of the Past – 2000
- The Changing of Times – 2002
- They're Only Chasing Safety – 2004
- Define the Great Line – 2006
- Survive, Kaleidoscope – 2008
- Lost in the Sound of Separation – 2008
- Live at Koko – 2010
- Erase Me – 2018
- Voyeurist – 2022
- The Place After This One – 2025

With The Almost

- Southern Weather – 2007
- No Gift to Bring – 2008
- Monster EP – 2009
- Monster Monster – 2009
- Fear Inside Our Bones – 2013
- Fear Caller – 2019

Solo

- Anthem Song – 2011
- Echo Your Song (Live) – EP – 2012
- Grace Through the Wandering – 2015
- Out of the Badlands – 2016
- Stick Figure Cowboy – 2021

Appearances in other albums

- "We Swim in Seas that Never Rest" (drums, guitars and vocals) from Collington -2016
- "You're The Wanker, If Anyone Is" from Say Anything's In Defense of the Genre – 2007
- "My God" from This Beautiful Republic's Perceptions – 2008
- "Then They Will Know" from Preson Phillips' The Observant and the Anawim... – 2008
- "Sahara" from Relient K's Forget And Not Slow Down – 2009
- "All About Us" from He Is We's My Forever – 2010
- "With Everything" by Nine O Five – 2010
- "Someway Somehow" from Run Kid Run's Patterns – 2011
- "I Survive" from We Came As Romans's Tracing Back Roots – 2013
- "The Reaper" from As It Is's The Great Depression – 2018
- "Super Hero" from Atreyu's In Our Wake – 2018
- "Infinite" from Silverstein's A Beautiful Place to Drown – 2020
- "Come Along" from The Dangerous Summer's All That's Left of the Blue Sky – 2021
- "Signals" by Venacava – 2020
- "Goodbye" by Dvddy featuring Aaron Gillespie – 2020
- "Dark Love" from Sullivan King's LOUD – 2021
- "Apertures" by Glass Houses – 2021
- "Tear You Apart" by GG Magree – 2021
- "Intersecting Storylines to the Same Tragedy" by SeeYouSpaceCowboy - 2021
- "U 2" by 408 – 2022
- "Background Character" by Supmikecheck – 2022
- "Healing Pool" by The Safest Ledge – 2022
- "Out Loud" from True North's Out Loud – 2022
- "VEN0M" by nothing,nowhere. - 2023
- “Day By Day” by A Foreign Affair (feat. Aaron Gillespie) - 2023
- "a bulleT w/ my namE On" by Bring Me the Horizon - 2024
- "Starry Skies (988)" by Kalamity Kills - 2024
- "Silver Spoon" by The Words We Use ft Aaron Gillespie - 2024
