= Say This Sooner =

Single by the Almost

from the album Southern Weather
- Released: February 13, 2007
- Recorded: 2006
- Length: 3:14
- Label: Tooth & Nail/Virgin
- Songwriter: Aaron Gillespie
- Producer: Aaron Sprinkle

The Almost singles chronology
"Say This Sooner" (2007)	"Southern Weather" (2007)

"Say This Sooner" (also known as "Say This Sooner (No One Will Ever See Things the Way I Do)") is a song by American alternative rock band the Almost. The song was released as the lead single from the band's debut studio album Southern Weather. The song is the band's most popular and successful, peaking at No. 7 on the Billboard Alternative Songs chart and No. 35 on the Mainstream Rock chart.

== Reception ==
Reception to "Say This Sooner" has been mostly positive, with reviewers calling it one of the best songs on the album.

Trey Pearson of Jesus Freak Hideout called the song "super catchy, extremely refreshing" and cited it as a standout track. Tom Spinelli of Melodic also called the song one of the best on the album. Conversely, Pabs Hernandez of LAS Magazine called the song a "horrible single."

== Music video ==
The song's music video was directed by Shane Drake.

The music video consists of Aaron Gillespie finding a device in his room that warps him into different places, as well as different people, such as a homeless man, a police officer, and an invisible man. Meanwhile, the band is playing outside in a desert-like environment and in a hotel room.

== Track listing ==
No.	Title	Length
1.	"Say This Sooner" (album version)	3:12
2.	"Say This Sooner" (alternate vocal)	3:12

== Personnel ==
The Almost

- Aaron Gillespie – lead vocals, lead guitar, rhythm guitar, bass, drums, percussion

Personnel in video

- Aaron Gillespie – lead vocals
- Dusty Redmon – lead guitar, backing vocals
- Nick D'Amico – rhythm guitar
- Alex Aponte – bass
- Joe Musten – drums

== Charts ==
=== Weekly charts ===
Weekly chart performance for "Say This Sooner"
Chart (2007)	Peak position
US Alternative Airplay (Billboard)	7
US Mainstream Rock (Billboard)	35

=== Year-end charts ===
Year-end chart performance for "Say This Sooner"
Chart (2007)	Position
US Alternative Songs (Billboard)	23
