= Monster Monster =

Studio album by The Almost
- Released: November 3, 2009
- Recorded: May 2009
- Studios: Seattle, Washington
- Genres: Alternative rock, emo
- Labels: Tooth & Nail, Virgin
- Producer: Aaron Sprinkle

The Almost chronology
Southern Weather (2007)	Monster Monster (2009)	Fear Inside Our Bones (2013)

Singles from Monster Monster
- 1. "Lonely Wheel" Released: September 17, 2009; 2. "Hands" Released: October 2, 2009

Professional ratings
Review scores
Source	Rating
AbsolutePunk	(80%)
AllMusic	4/5 stars
Alternative Press	3/5 stars
Bring On Mixed Reviews	3.5/5 stars
Jesus Freak Hideout	4.5/5 stars
Melodic	3.5/5 stars
Sputnikmusic	3.0/5 stars

Monster Monster is the second album by American rock band The Almost, released on November 3, 2009.

== Background ==
The Almost released their debut album, Southern Weather in 2007. On November 9, 2008, it was announced that the band had parted ways with drummer Kenny Bozich. Later that month, the band released a holiday-themed EP, No Gift to Bring.

== Recording ==
On April 29, 2009, the band arrived at Dark Horse Recording studio in Franklin, Tennessee. The recording process was documented with tweets, a live Stickam stream, and blogs. Like the band's debut Southern Weather, Monster Monster was produced by Aaron Sprinkle. Due to the band's lack of a drummer at the time, lead singer Aaron Gillespie played drums for the record. After the recording and mastering of the record, Gillespie stated, "This now feels like a real band. Everyone gave up a piece of his own agenda for the good of the final result. And that's how you end up with something special. They supplied the bricks and we built this house together." On May 7, a studio update was posted online, followed by another on May 26.

== Release ==
The first single from the album is "Hands" and it was released onto radio stations October 2, 2009, and it has cracked the Top 5 on the Christian Rock charts. When speaking of touring, Gillespie noted that "[The Almost] plan on hitting it as hard as we can." Vilardi concurred with "We'd like to leave and not come back for two years." In October and November, the group supported the Used on their headlining US tour. On November 23, 2009, a music video was released for "Lonely Wheel". In February and March 2010, the band performed at Soundwave festival in Australia. The third track on the album, "No I Don't," debuted on the Christian Rock chart on March 5.

== Track listing ==
All tracks are written by Aaron Gillespie, Dusty Redmon, Alex Aponte and Jay Vilardi.

No.	Title	Length
1.	"Monster Monster"	3:20
2.	"Lonely Wheel"	3:14
3.	"No I Don't"	3:54
4.	"Hands"	3:48
5.	"Young Again"	2:58
6.	"Summer Summer"	4:00
7.	"Hand Grenade"	3:51
8.	"Books & Books"	3:31
9.	"Souls on Ten"	3:25
10.	"Want To"	3:30
11.	"Get Through"	3:24
12.	"Monster"	6:16

Best Buy limited edition bonus tracks
No.	Title	Length
13.	"West"	3:40
14.	"Wrong"	3:03

iTunes bonus tracks
No.	Title	Length
13.	"Me & Alone"	3:03

Re-issue deluxe edition bonus tracks
No.	Title	Length
13.	"Birmingham"	2:21
14.	"July"	3:28
15.	"Wrong"	3:03
16.	"Out West"	3:40
17.	"Me & Alone"	3:04
18.	"Hands" (music video)	3:33
19.	"Lonely Wheel" (music video)	3:13
20.	"No I Don't" (music video)	4:10
21.	"Monster Monster" (music video)	3:34

== Personnel ==
The Almost

- Aaron Gillespie – lead vocals, percussion, rhythm guitar, banjo, keyboards, piano
- Jay Vilardi – guitar
- Dusty Redmon – guitar
- Alex Aponte – bass
- Joe Musten – drums

Additional musicians

- John Davis – steel guitar
- Chris Scruggs – steel guitar
- Josiah Holland – keyboards

Production

- Aaron Sprinkle – producer, guitar, vocals, keyboards
- Zach Blackstone – assistant
- Jordan Butcher – art direction, design
- Mike Carr – assistant engineer
- Matt Carter (Emery) – mixing
- Roberto Chamorro – photography
- Brandon Ebel – A&R, executive producer
- Ted Jensen – mastering
- Brian Kroll – A&R
- Ethan Luck – photography
- J.R. McNeely – mixing
- Randy Nichols – management
- Dave Powell (Emery) – drum technician
- Melissa Sabo – assistant
- Rob "Just Fine" Stevenson – A&R
- Matt Watts – assistant

== Monster EP ==
Monster EP was released on October 6, 2009, one month before the launch of Monster Monster. It was sold exclusively through retail store Hot Topic, the band's website and a tour supporting Monster Monster.

No.	Title	Length
1.	"Lonely Wheel"	3:14
2.	"Hands"	3:49
3.	"July" (b-side)	3:29
4.	"Birmingham" (b-side)	2:22
5.	"Monster"	6:16

The song "Hands" is the first single, which will include a music video, from Monster Monster and the EP to be released to radio stations. The EP packaging is a double-disc digipak, one of the discs contain the music and the other contains no data at all, but depicts the artwork that Monster Monster will have on the disc's label along with lyrics and printed track listing.
