= Perceptions (This Beautiful Republic album) =

Studio album by This Beautiful Republic
- Released: August 19, 2008
- Genre: Christian rock, contemporary Christian music
- Length: 49:21
- Label: ForeFront
- Producer: Allen Salmon

This Beautiful Republic chronology
Even Heroes Need a Parachute (2007)	Perceptions (2008)

Professional ratings
Review scores
Source	Rating
AllMusic	3.5/5 stars
Christianity Today	2/5 stars
Jesus Freak Hideout	3.5/5 stars

Perceptions is the second and final full-length studio album by the Christian rock band This Beautiful Republic. The album was released by ForeFront Records on August 19, 2008. The album charted at No. 21 on the Billboard Top Christian albums chart and No. 16 on the Billboard Heatsseeker albums chart.

== Track listing ==
Album release
No.	Title	Writer(s)	Length
1.	"Pain"	This Beautiful Republic, Allen Salmon	4:10
2.	"Surrender Saved My Life"	This Beautiful Republic, Salmon	4:27
3.	"Learning to Fall"	This Beautiful Republic, Ben Olin	4:49
4.	"Beautifully Broken"	This Beautiful Republic, Marc Byrd, Sarah Hart	3:15
5.	"No Turning Back"	This Beautiful Republic, Salmon	2:54
6.	"My God" (featuring Aaron Gillespie)	This Beautiful Republic, Salmon	2:57
7.	"For the Life of Me"	This Beautiful Republic, Olin, Salmon	3:39
8.	"Last Second Chance"	This Beautiful Republic, Salmon	2:52
9.	"Stay With You Tonight"	This Beautiful Republic, Salmon	3:55
10.	"Change the World"	This Beautiful Republic, Salmon	3:30
11.	"A Point Between Extremes"	This Beautiful Republic, Salmon	5:13
12.	"The Ones"	This Beautiful Republic	3:40
13.	"Say Goodnight"	This Beautiful Republic	3:58
Total length:			49:21
