= The Benjamin Gate =

South African Christian rock band

- Origin: Port Elizabeth, South Africa
- Genres: Christian rock, pop, alternative rock
- Years active: 1998–2003
- Label: ForeFront
- Past members: Costa Balamatsias; Adrienne Liesching; Brett Palmer; Justin Mulder; Marc "Mac" Pautz; Chris Poisat; Nick Volsteedt
- Website: thebenjamingate.net

The Benjamin Gate was a South African Christian rock band formed in 1998 by friends of musician Ben Herbert following his death in a traffic collision. Their name, which was also the name of one of the entrances into the original city of Jerusalem, was chosen as a tribute to him.

== History ==
The Benjamin Gate released two local, independent albums while in South Africa, Spinning Head and comeputyourheadupinmyheart. The band, along with their manager and co-songwriter Marc "Thux" Theodosiou, left Port Elizabeth and came to the United States in 2001 after David Bach at ForeFront Records heard their demo that they had sent to Nashville for mastering.

Many of the songs of comeputyourheadupinmyheart were retooled and re-released on their first major-label album for Forefront Records, ["untitled"]. This album and Contact were critically acclaimed albums. They were nominated for four Dove Awards, produced two No. 1 and one No. 2 singles, and toured the United States and Europe. Their merchandise was easily recognized by their gasmask logo. They had an endorsement contract from Oakley, Inc. This success helped them to be included on three Festival Con Dios tours.

== Break-up ==
The group parted ways in 2003 due to lead singer Adrienne Liesching's engagement to Christian artist Jeremy Camp. It was noted that Liesching felt that with her new family starting, that she could not handle the duties required of her both as a musician and as a wife. Since then, Liesching has married Camp and had two daughters, born in 2004 and 2006, and a son, born in 2011. She has also released two solo albums as "Adie".

Pautz and his wife and children have relocated to South Africa. Balamatsias remained in Nashville playing with various artists until early 2006 when he relocated to South Africa. Volsteedt has also returned to the country.

Marc Theodosiou currently works in the music and technology industries in Nashville, TN.

== Band members ==
- Costa Balamatsias – bass
- Adrienne Liesching – vocals
- Justin Mulder – drums (later replaced by Brett Palmer)
- Brett Palmer – drums (later replaced by Nick Volsteedt)
- Marc "Mac" Pautz – guitar
- Chris Poisat – guitar
- Marc Theodosiou – co-songwriter and manager

== Discography ==
- Spinning Head EP (1999)

Track listing:

1. "To Get Thru"
2. "Parent"
3. "Love's Not Love"
4. "Trench Prayer"
5. "Drown"
6. "Draw Water"
7. "Thumping Friends"
8. "The Healing"
- comeputyourheadupinmyheart (1999)

Track listing:

1. "Blow My Mind"
2. "Heaven Pan II"
3. "Rush"
4. "Hands"
5. "Falling Up"
6. "Grow Alive"
7. "Secret"
8. "All Over Me"
9. "Blow My Mind"
- ["untitled"] (2001)

Track listing:

1. "How Long" (3:35)
2. "Scream" (4:28)
3. "All Over Me" (4:10)
4. "Heaven" (3:54)
5. "Lay It Down" (3:19)
6. "Nightglow" (4:10)
7. "Blow My Mind" (2:48)
8. "Halo" (3:35)
9. "Rush" (5:35)
10. "Secret" (4:37)
11. "Hands" (4:18)
12. "Live Out Loud" (6:37)
13. "True" (hidden track) (4:12)
- demographics (2002)

Track listing:

1. "To Get Thru"
2. "Swoon"
3. "Draw Water"
4. "Fallin Up"
5. "Parent"
6. "Olah"
7. "Thumping Friends"
8. "Give it Up"
9. "The Healing"
- Contact (2002)

Track listing:

1. "Lift Me Up" (3:09)
2. "This Is Not" (2:34)
3. "The Calling" (2:46)
4. "Do What You Say" (2:39)
5. "Overkill" (Colin Hay cover) (3:37)
6. "Need" (4:55)
7. "Light" (2:53)
8. "Your Kisses Blind Me" (4:05)
9. "Tonight" (3:49)
10. "Gratitude" (3:05)
11. "The Way You Are" (3:46)
12. "Violently" (3:50)
13. "Fall Away" (2:59)
14. "The Calling" (alternate version) (3:00)
