= Southern Weather =

Studio album by the Almost
- Released: April 3, 2007
- Recorded: Mid-2006
- Studio: Compound Recording, Seattle, Washington
- Genre: Alternative rock, emo, pop rock, pop punk, post-hardcore
- Length: 38:07
- Label: Tooth & Nail, Virgin
- Producer: Aaron Sprinkle

The Almost chronology
Southern Weather (2007)	Monster Monster (2009)

Singles from Southern Weather
- 1. "Say This Sooner" Released: February 13, 2007; 2. "Southern Weather" Released: October 2, 2007

Southern Weather is the debut album by Underoath drummer Aaron Gillespie's solo-project, the Almost.

== Background and production ==
In October 2005, Gillespie was in New York City and had the urge to do some straight-forward rock songs. After telling his manager, he was put in a studio where he started working on material. That evening, he received the songs from the studio and posted two demos ("I Mostly Copy Other People" and "Never Say "I Told You So"") on his Myspace profile. Gillespie was recording with Underoath (for Define the Great Line) at the time and, as their drummer and co-vocalist, was in a several week period between tracking drums and doing the vocals. To keep himself productive during this lull, he wrote a bunch of songs that differed from the band's sound and fit a more alternative rock vein.

Southern Weather was produced by Aaron Sprinkle; Gillespie was initially going to work with someone different until an A&R representative at Tooth & Nail Records suggested Sprinkle. Gillespie didn't know Sprinkle beforehand, but admired his work with Pedro the Lion. Recording sessions were held at Compound Recording in Seattle, Washington with Zach Hodges acting as the additional engineer. Gillespie tracked the drums on a kit made by former Pearl Jam drum tech Aaron Mlasko. Gillespie used a number of snares to achieve as many different tones as he could. For "Dirty and Left Out", the drums were recorded into one microphone with a tambourine taped to the bass drum.

"Dirty and Left Out" also features an additional vocal from Sunny Day Real Estate frontman Jeremy Enigk, who grew up with Sprinkle. Though Gillespie had considered the album finished by this point, Sprinkle recorded Enigk's part while Gillespie was busy touring with Underoath. J.R. McNeely mixed almost every track (except for "Say This Sooner") with assistant Lars Katz at Compound Recording. "Say This Sooner" was mixed by David Bendeth with engineer Dan Korneff at the House of Loud in Elmwood Park, New Jersey. John Bender handled additional vocal recording at the same studio. The recordings were then mastered by Ted Jensen at Sterling Sound in New York City.

== Music and lyrics ==
Musically, the album has been described as alternative rock, emo, pop rock, coming across as less aggressive in both the music and vocals than Underoath's screamo stylings. Additionally, Alternative Press described the album's style as representing "scene music".

Though Gillespie received writing credit for all of the songs, Underoath guitarist Tim McTague helped him write one of the tracks. Gillespie performed nearly all the instrumentation on the record. Sprinkle contributed additional guitar and keyboards; Kevin Suggs adds pedal steel guitar. Discussing "Say This Sooner", Gillespie said: "I've had struggles along the way [growing up in the Deep South]. But I am very much informed by Southern values and I think the songs speak to that." Alternative country-influenced "Dirty and Left Out" was written after Gillespie and Sprinkle listened to Ocean Beach (1995) by Red House Painters. The track, along with "Amazing Because It Is", serves as a declaration of his Christian faith.

"Amazing Because It Is" sees Gillespie emulating the vocal style of Dashboard Confessional's Chris Carrabba, and features horns (performed by John Painter) and cello (performed by Matt Slocum), which were arranged by Slocum. Gillespie went to a church, which invited their youth groups at Calvary Fellowship (based in Mountlake Terrace, Washington) to add a choir singing "Amazing Grace" as the chorus. "Everyone Here Smells Like a Rat" has a mixed Thursday-meets-Oasis vibe to it, and features guest vocals and bass additions from the Starting Line frontman Kenny Vasoli. Vasoli also contributes bass to the album's title-track "Southern Weather". "Never Say "I Told You So"", which has guest vocals from Sprinkle, and "Call Back When I'm Honest" are musically reminiscent to songs on Taking Back Sunday's Louder Now (2006). Closing track "Everything That Makes Me Sick" begins with carnival-esque sounds before the guitars start.

== Release ==
On November 28, 2006, "Southern Weather" was made available for streaming via the band's Myspace profile. In January 2007, the band went on their first tour, a US headlining tour with support from Forgive Durden and Classic Case. The group's touring line-up consisted of Gillespie, guitarists Jay Vilardi and Dusty Redman, bassist Alex Aponte and drummer Kenny Bozich. Vilardi was friends with Underoath's drum tech and lived in Gillespie's area; Vilardi recruited the other members, except for Bozich, who was discovered by Gillespie's wife at a church. On January 31, Southern Weather was announced for release in April, and its track listing was revealed. "Say This Sooner" was posted online on February 7, before being released as a radio single on February 13.

On February 28, "I Mostly Copy Other People" was made available for streaming. A music video was released for "Say This Sooner" in March; it features Gillespie traveling through time, and received heavy rotation on MTV. The clip was directed by Shane Drake and filmed in Southern California. Southern Weather was made available for streaming on March 25, before being released as a joint venture between Tooth & Nail and major label Virgin Records on April 3. Following this, the band supported Saves the Day and Say Anything on a small number of dates. In April and May, the band supported Paramore on their tour of the US, and appeared at The Bamboozle and Cornerstone Festivals. From late July to mid July then late July to late August, the band went on the Warped Tour.

Following the tour's conclusion, the group went on a headlining tour in August and September, with support from Meg & Dia and former Beloved frontman Josh Moore. A music video was released for "Southern Weather" on September 26 and the song was released to radio on October 2. In November, the group supported the Starting Line and Paramore on their co-headlining US tour. The band performed alongside the Starting Line for a few shows in December. In May and June 2008, the band went on a US tour alongside Emery, Envy on the Coast and Army of Me. "Dirty and Left Out" and "Amazing Because It Is" were reworked for the group's Christmas EP No Gift to Bring (2008).

== Reception ==
Professional ratings
Review scores
Source	Rating
AbsolutePunk	72%
AllMusic	3.5/5 stars
Chart Attack	Unfavorable
Cross Rhythms	9/10 stars
Jesus Freak Hideout	4/5 stars
LAS Magazine	4/10
Melodic	3.5/5 stars
Spin	3.5/5 stars
Yahoo! Music	Favorable

=== Commercial performance ===
Southern Weather debuted at No. 39 on the US Billboard 200, selling about 29,000 copies in its first week. As of June 2007, the album has sold 72,000 copies in the US. "Say This Sooner" has also been released to mainstream radio and has reached as high as No. 7 on Modern Rock Tracks.

== Track listing ==
All songs written by Aaron Gillespie.

Standard edition
No.	Title	Length
1.	"Say This Sooner"	3:14
2.	"Drive There Now"	3:11
3.	"Dirty and Left Out"	3:42
4.	"I Mostly Copy Other People"	3:22
5.	"Southern Weather"	3:28
6.	"Stop It"	3:36
7.	"Amazing Because It Is"	4:24
8.	"Everyone Here Smells Like a Rat"	3:18
9.	"Never Say "I Told You So""	2:59
10.	"Call Back When I'm Honest"	3:24
11.	"Everything That Makes Me Sick"	3:31
Total length:		38:07

iTunes bonus tracks
No.	Title	Length
12.	"Hold On"	3:54
13.	"Say This Sooner" (acoustic)	3:03

== Personnel ==
Personnel per booklet.

The Almost

- Aaron Gillespie – lead vocals, all instruments except where noted

Additional musicians

- Aaron Sprinkle – additional guitar, keyboards, guest vocals (track 9)
- Kevin Suggs – pedal steel guitar
- Matt Slocum – horns and string arrangement and cello (track 7)
- John Painter – horns (track 7)
- The Youth Group at Calvary Fellowship – choir (track 7)
- Kenny Vasoli – guest vocals (track 4), bass guitar (tracks 4 and 5)
- Jeremy Enigk – guest vocals (track 3)

Production

- Aaron Sprinkle – producer, recording
- Zach Hodges – additional engineering
- J.R. McNeely – mixing (except track 1)
- David Bendeth – mixing (track 1)
- Dan Korneff – mixing engineer
- John Bender – additional vocal recording
- Lars Katz – mixing assistant
- Ted Jensen – mastering
- Parker Young – photography
- Siesta – design
