= Even Heroes Need a Parachute =

Studio album by This Beautiful Republic
- Released: April 3, 2007
- Genre: Christian rock
- Length: 38:33
- Label: ForeFront
- Producer: Allen Salmon

This Beautiful Republic chronology
Casting Off EP (2007)	Even Heroes Need a Parachute (2007)	Perceptions (2008)

Professional ratings
Review scores
Source	Rating
AllMusic	link
Christian Music Today	link
Silent Uproar	(3.8/5)
Christian Music Review	9/10 stars

Even Heroes Need a Parachute is the first studio album by American Christian rock band This Beautiful Republic. It was released in the United States on April 3, 2007 through ForeFront Records. In mid-2007, it was also made available in European countries.

== Background and release ==
In November 2006, ForeFront Records announced that they signed a record deal with This Beautiful Republic with the release of the single "Jesus To The World". The three-song Casting Off EP, containing two songs from the album (including the single), was released in January 2007.

Even Heroes Need a Parachute was produced by Allen Salmon, and mixed by Mark Needham. The album was first released in the United States on April 3, 2007, and later in Europe during mid-2007. The band went on a three-week European tour in August 2007 to support its release.

== Style and songwriting ==
Allmusic labeled Even Heroes Need a Parachute's genre as "Alternative CCM", comparing its sound to rock bands Jimmy Eat World, Foo Fighters, and Anberlin. The album has also been described as having power pop influences, specifically on the track "Black Box".

"Right Now" was co-written by fellow CCM artist Joy Williams. All other tracks were written by the band members and producer Allen Salmon.

=== Lyrical themes ===
Lead singer Ben Olin said that the album's title was chosen to "emphasize the common ground that all humans share. No matter who you are or what you do, the need for a savior is vital. So we hope, beyond anything else, to show people this savior, Christ, and to give listeners a brush with eternity."

The song "Black Box" is an allegory between faith and passengers on a crashing plane, questioning their legacy and Christian faith. The song uses the analogy of a black box recording the events and choices in one's life; "Our black box is hearing the hope and the fearing/What will it say?"

== Singles ==
The first single off the album was "Jesus to the World", which was released in fall of 2006, being circulated and played across US radios by November 2006. The song "Black Box" was released as a single in mid-2007, becoming notably played on Christian rock radios in early September 2007. "Right Now" was also released to Christian radios in 2007.

== Track listing ==
All tracks are written by This Beautiful Republic and Allen Salmon.

Album release
No.	Title	Length
1.	"Casting Off"	3:11
2.	"Going Under"	3:36
3.	"Jesus to the World"	3:31
4.	"Right Now"	3:43
5.	"Black Box"	3:18
6.	"The Surface"	2:49
7.	"Let's Be Honest"	3:32
8.	"New Year"	3:32
9.	"Something to Deny"	2:58
10.	"Fears and Failures"	3:36
11.	"Cloud Cover"	4:47
Total length:		38:33
