= Adrienne Camp =

South African singer and songwriter

- Also known as: Adie
- Born: Adrienne Liesching; 12 July 1981 (age 45); Port Elizabeth, Eastern Cape, South Africa
- Genres: Contemporary Christian, pop, pop-rock
- Years active: 2001–present
- Labels: BEC Recordings, Capitol CMG
- Formerly of: The Benjamin Gate
- Spouse: Jeremy Camp (m. 2003)
- Website: www.myspace.com/adiecamp/

Adrienne “Adie” Camp (née Liesching; born 12 July 1981) is a South African singer and songwriter, who is known as the lead singer of the Christian pop-rock band the Benjamin Gate before the group disbanded in 2003. She briefly contributed to other artist's albums, namely her duet with rapper John Reuben featured on his album Professional Rapper and her background vocals on husband Jeremy Camp's albums Restored and Live Unplugged, after the Benjamin Gate disbanded.

Under the name Adrienne Camp, she released her debut solo album Don't Wait on 26 September 2006 on Capitol CMG. The album was co-produced by her husband Jeremy Camp. Her song "Your Way" climbed into the Top 15 on R&R Magazine's Christian chart in May 2007. Her second album, Just You and Me, was released on 9 March 2010.

== Personal life ==
In December 2003, Liesching married American musician, Jeremy Camp. The couple met on a three-month-long tour in 2002. They have three children.

== Voice ==
Todd Hertz of Christianity Today described Camp's voice as "lovely and ferocious," a "strange combination of Bjork's quavering and the power of Shirley Manson." A reviewer writing for the Daily Herald of Arlington Heights, Illinois described Camp's voice as evocative of Gwen Stefani, Aimee Echo, Christina Aguilera, and Shakira, all the while "remaining very unique and distinctive."

== Discography ==
The Benjamin Gate

- Spinning Head EP (1999)
- Comeputyourheadupinmyheart (1999)
- Untitled (2001)
- Demographics (2002)
- Contact (2002)

Solo

- Don't Wait (26 September 2006)
- Just You and Me (9 March 2010)

Duo

- The Worship Project EP (4 September 2020) with Jeremy Camp
