= Don't Wait (album) =

Studio album by Adie
- Released: September 26, 2006
- Genres: Contemporary Christian music, Christian rock
- Length: 35:36
- Label: BEC
- Producers: Aaron Sprinkle; Jeremy Camp; Zach Hodges; Andy Dodd; Adam Watts

Adie chronology
Don't Wait (2006)	Just You And Me (2010)

Professional ratings
Review scores
Source	Rating
Jesus Freak Hideout	3.5/5 stars
AllMusic	4/5 stars

Don't Wait is the first solo studio album released by Adie on September 26, 2006.

== Track listing ==
#	Song title	Songwriters	Time
1	"Your Way"	Andy Dodd, Adam Watts	3:43
2	"When It's Over"	Adie Camp, Jeremy Camp	3:55
3	"Sufficient"	Adie Camp, Scott Cunningham	3:33
4	"Don't Wait (Lazy Day)"	Adie Camp	3:53
5	"Overwhelm Me"	Adie Camp, Jeremy Camp, Jean-Luc Lajoie	3:17
6	"Time"	Adie Camp, Jeremy Camp, Jean-Luc Lajoie	4:12
7	"If I'll Ever"	Adie Camp, Jeremy Camp	3:13
8	"What Have I Done"	Adie Camp, Suzanna Pautz	2:59
9	"Broken"	Adie Camp	3:29
10	"Turn! Turn! Turn!"	Pete Seeger	3:26

== Personnel ==
- Adie Camp – all vocals
- Justin Glasco – Rhodes electric piano (2)
- Zach Hodges – keyboards (2, 7, 9), programming (2–4, 7, 9), guitars (2), bass (2), acoustic piano (3, 4, 8), strings (3), electric guitar (3, 9)
- Aaron Sprinkle – keyboards (10), programming (10), guitars (10), bass (10), percussion (10)
- Andy Dodd – guitars (1, 5, 6)
- Jeremy Camp – acoustic guitar (2, 4, 7, 9)
- Jared Camp – guitars (2, 3), electric guitar (4, 7)
- Michael Martin – bass (3, 4, 7)
- Adam Watts – drums (1, 5, 6)
- Jules Rodriguez – drums (2–4, 7, 9)
- Jesse Sprinkle – drums (10)

=== Production ===
- Brandon Ebel – executive producer
- Andy Dodd – producer (1, 5, 6), mixing (1, 5, 6)
- Adam Watts – producer (1, 5, 6), mixing (1, 5, 6)
- Zach Hodges – producer (2–4, 7–9), mixing (8)
- Jeremy Camp – producer (3, 4, 7, 9)
- Aaron Sprinkle – producer (10)
- J.R. McNeely – mixing (2–4, 7–10)
- Troy Glessner – mastering at Spectre Studios (Tacoma, Washington)
- Asterik Studio – art direction, design
- Jeremy Cowart – photography
- Matt Balm and Flat Out Entertainment – management
