= Underoath =

American rock band

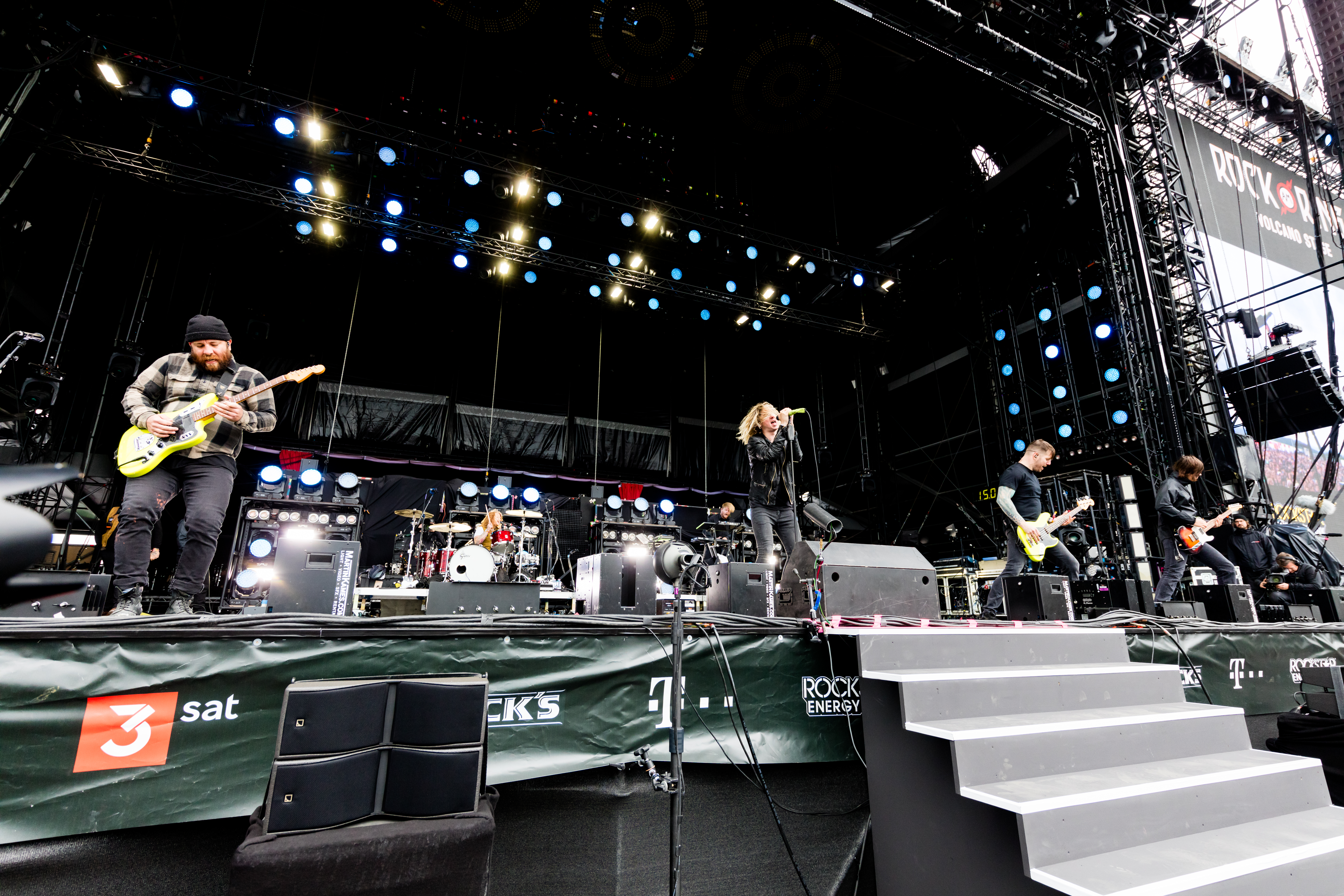
- Underoath performing at Rock am Ring in 2019

Background information
- Also known as: Locus Ultra
- Origin: Tampa, Florida, U.S.
- Genres: Metalcore; post-hardcore; screamo; emo; Christian metal (early)
- Works: Underoath discography
- Years active: 1997–2013; 2015–present
- Labels: Roadrunner; Solid State; Tooth & Nail; Takehold; Fearless; MNRK
- Spinoffs: Maylene and the Sons of Disaster; The Almost; Sleepwave
- Members: Aaron Gillespie; Christopher Dudley; Timothy McTague; Grant Brandell; Spencer Chamberlain
- Past members: Band members
- Website: underoath777.com

Underoath (styled as Underøath or UnderOath) is an American rock band from Tampa, Florida. It was founded by lead vocalist Dallas Taylor and guitarist Luke Morton in 1997 in Ocala, Florida; subsequently, its additional members were from Tampa, including drummer, singer and last remaining original member Aaron Gillespie. The band's current lineup consists of Gillespie, keyboardist Christopher Dudley, lead guitarist Timothy McTague, bassist Grant Brandell, and lead vocalist Spencer Chamberlain.

The band's lineup shifted frequently during its early years. Taylor recorded Act of Depression, Cries of the Past, and The Changing of Times with the band and remained with the group until his departure in 2003; Chamberlain replaced him as lead vocalist, and the lineup has remained mostly stable since. The band then released They're Only Chasing Safety and Define the Great Line, and both earned gold certifications by the RIAA. These two albums remain their most commercially successful releases, and provided them with mainstream status; the latter of the two holds their highest Billboard 200 entry, peaking at no. 2. Following their sixth studio album, Lost in the Sound of Separation, which also reached a top-ten peak on the Billboard 200, Gillespie left the group and was replaced by former Norma Jean drummer Daniel Davison. Their seventh album, Ø (Disambiguation), was released in 2010; Chamberlain and McTague provided more prominent sung vocals in Gillespie's absence. On October 2, 2012, Underoath announced that they would be disbanding in 2013; they played their final show that January.

On August 17, 2015, the band announced they had reunited; in doing so, Gillespie returned to the lineup. After performing at A Day to Remember's Self Help Fest in 2016, Underoath announced their eighth studio album, Erase Me, would be released 2018. It was their first album in 8 years and their first in 10 years with Gillespie; the band also publicly abandoned their Christian musical approach starting with this record. The follow-up, Voyeurist, was released in January 2022, and their tenth studio album, The Place After This One, came out in March 2025.

== History ==
=== Formation and Act of Depression (1997–2000) ===
On November 30, 1997, Underoath formed with Dallas Taylor and guitarist Luke Morton in Ocala, Florida. Morton devised the name Underoath "from somewhere in the Bible." Drummer Aaron Gillespie was then asked to join when Morton's father visited Gillespie's church; hearing Gillespie play. Gillespie agreed, and the group recruited guitarist Corey Steger and bassist Octavio Fernandez; the band members were all in high school.

After a year of playing at festivals and touring the area around Florida, Underoath signed to Alabama's Takehold Records in 1999. Around this time Luke Morton had left the band without appearing on any of their formal recordings. They released their debut Act of Depression that July, and it sold over 2,000 copies.

=== Cries of the Past and The Changing of Times (2000–2003) ===
In 2000, keyboardist Christopher Dudley joined Underoath, and the five-song, forty-minute long record, Cries of the Past was released, quickly selling 3,000 copies. In 2001, Corey Steger left the band; he died in a car accident on March 17, 2021. Takehold Records was bought out by Seattle's Tooth & Nail Records and Underoath was subsequently signed to the label's subsidiary, Solid State Records. In January 2002, bassist Grant Brandell joined Underoath. The band then began working on their Solid State debut, The Changing of Times, with Cries of the Past producer James Paul Wisner. The album was released on February 26, 2002, and produced one single: "When the Sun Sleeps". Dallas Taylor explained that the lyrics on The Changing of Times were about "people playing with other people's emotions and how it can leave you bitter" and "struggling through life's hardships and trying to find God in all of it."

In 2003, Underoath supported the album's release with their first inclusion on Warped Tour, however their participation in the tour came to an end when Taylor (under controversial conditions) was asked to leave the band. Dudley explained at that time that Taylor could no longer tour with Underoath for various reasons and left on his own decision. Under speculation of a potential breakup, the band then went on a supporting tour with Atreyu in August 2003 with Matt Tarpey as the temporary lead vocalist, while at the time being a part of Winter Solstice. In October 2003, at the CMJ Fest in New York City, the band reappeared with Spencer Chamberlain, formerly of the band This Runs Through, as the new lead vocalist. Chamberlain had toured with Underoath when fronting his former band and at one time was roommates with Dudley; their previous friendship with Chamberlain was considered when making him lead vocalist. Gillespie explained that before Chamberlain had been in the band, the group members "didn't really get along", however, after Chamberlain joined "everything was just normal, we clicked". After Chamberlain became a permanent member, Underoath discussed the possibility of changing the name and becoming a new band. Ultimately, the members decided to remain as Underoath.

=== They're Only Chasing Safety (2004–2005) ===
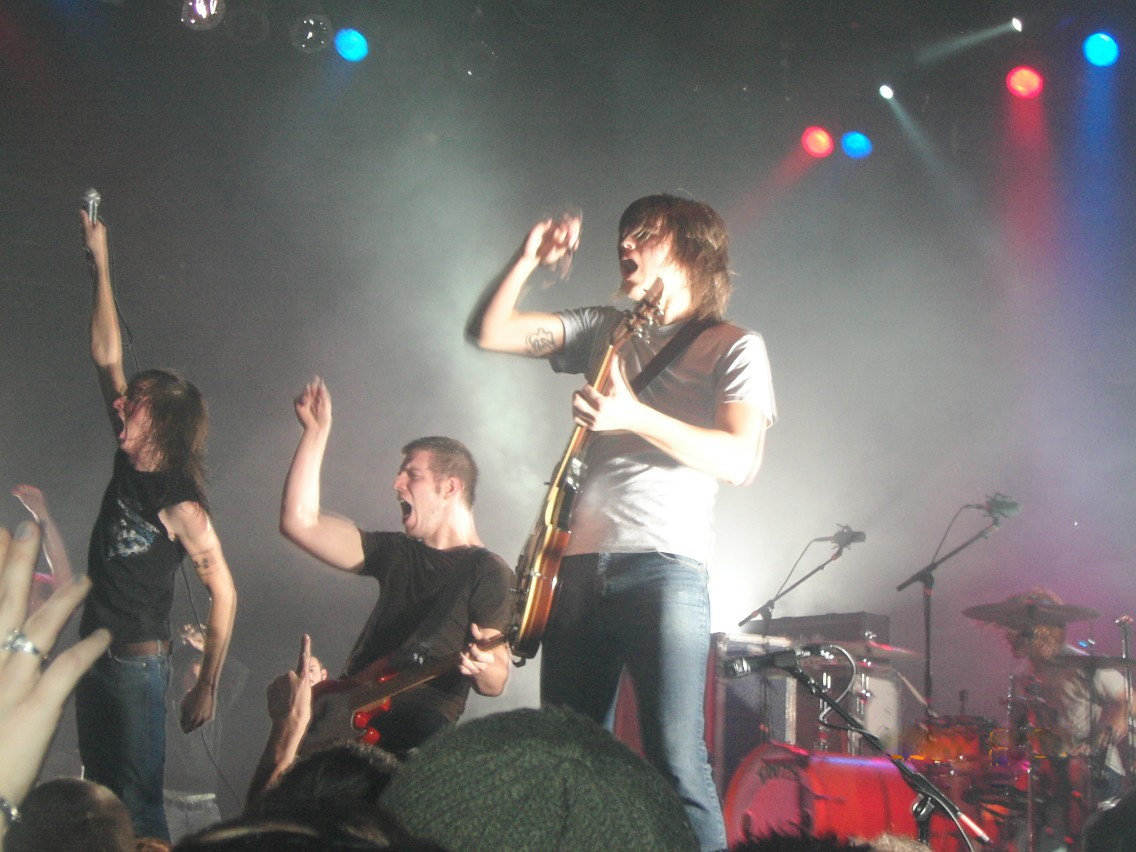
Underoath in 2005

After taking the end of 2003 off from touring to begin working on an album, the band scheduled time in February 2004 to begin recording.

During the early months of 2004, Underoath returned to the studio with Chamberlain as lead vocalist and producer James Paul Wisner. They're Only Chasing Safety was released on June 15, 2004, and proved to be a more commercial success for the band, going onto outsell the previous three albums combined. The album sold close to 100,000 copies in its first week of release and was certified gold by the end of 2005, selling more than 487,000 copies. With Gillespie being the only original member, They're Only Chasing Safety had been a vast change in sound and rhythm from what they performed earlier on. "Reinventing Your Exit" and "It's Dangerous Business Walking out Your Front Door" were released as the album's two singles and both songs spawned music videos that received frequent airplay on MTV2 and Fuse.

In March 2005, Underoath participated in the inaugural Taste of Chaos tour, and shortly after, embarked on their first headlining tour. The band premiered two brand-new songs during the length of the tour. They played a part of the Warped Tour, but declined to perform for the entirety of the tour in order to take time to record another album. Underoath made their first covers of national magazines appearing on CCM Magazine in July 2005 and then Alternative Press in September, and in October, They're Only Chasing Safety was re-released in a two-disc set with four formerly unreleased songs. Also included was re-mastered album artwork by Jacob Bannon of Converge, and a DVD with over two hours of footage of the band touring in support of the album. As of 2005, They're Only Chasing Safety has sold more than 218,000 copies, with the re-release selling an additional 279,000 copies, making a combined sales of more than 500,000 copies in the US alone.

=== Define the Great Line (2006–2007) ===
The title for their fifth album, Define the Great Line is presented upon the theory of an individual having "to find that line and that way to live your life." The band had been writing for the album two weeks after the release of They're Only Chasing Safety. Matt Goldman, who produced albums for Copeland and Norma Jean, and Adam Dutkiewicz, guitarist for Killswitch Engage, enlisted as producers. Chamberlain noted that the vocals for the album would sound less like an imitation of former vocalist Taylor, but more like the vocals of Chamberlain's former band. The lyrics were also meaningful to Chamberlain because they had been written about "things that have molded him into who he is today".

An unfinished version of the album was leaked onto BitTorrent websites and P2P services months before the release date. Drummer Aaron Gillespie, during the short time after the recording of Define the Great Line, recorded the debut album for his side-project The Almost, which was produced by Seattle producer Aaron Sprinkle and was released April 3, 2007. In April 2006, the band had been courted by several major record labels, instead re-signing with Tooth & Nail Records because they felt that major labels "don't get heavy bands" and "we don't really agree with a lot of the business practices major labels employ sometimes." On April 21, Underoath flew to Sweden to work with Popcore Films, to create music videos for "In Regards to Myself" and "Writing on the Walls"; the latter was chosen as the lead single for the album and was later nominated for the 2007 Grammy Award for Best Short Form Music Video. Dudley commented that the videos were "high-energy videos and more intricate than any video we've ever done."

Released on June 20, 2006, Define the Great Line sold 98,000 copies in its first week and debuted on the Billboard 200 Chart at No. 2, the highest debut for a Christian album since 1997. With the debut of Define the Great Line, Underoath simultaneously released a special edition version of the album featuring special artwork and a DVD that includes another behind-the-scenes movie and a "making of" video. Define the Great Line was certified Gold by the RIAA on November 11, 2006, representing 500,000 shipped units of the album. The album was also released on vinyl however, this edition was limited to only 3,000 copies.

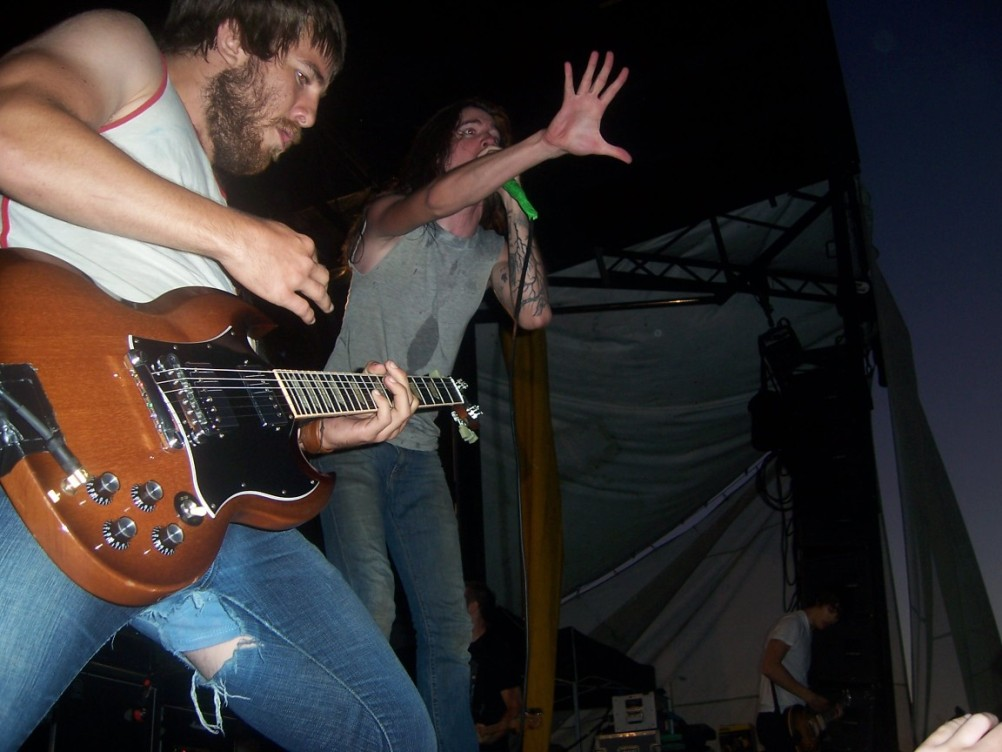
Guitarist Timothy McTague and vocalist Spencer Chamberlain performing at 2006's Warped Tour in San Diego, California.

The band was scheduled to spend June and July 2006 on the main stage of the Warped Tour, but on July 28, 2006, it was announced that Underoath was dropping off the remaining dates of the tour. A statement from the band stated that the members "felt it necessary to take some immediate time to focus on our friendship, as that's more important than risking it for the sake of touring at this time." In an Alternative Press cover story on Underoath, Michael "Fat Mike" Burkett told the magazine that Chamberlain had confided in him that Underoath's band members had been "having a lot of arguments over their religious beliefs." Burkett admitted to Punknews.org that he had poked fun at the band for their beliefs, but emphasized that he befriended Underoath's band members at the start of the tour and had a personal policy of not making jokes on-stage about anyone he was not friends with or did not like personally. It was also spread that the band's withdrawal from the tour was due to Chamberlain's rumored drug problems and time spent in rehabilitation, to which Gillespie responded, "If there was something serious going on like that and he was in rehab, we'd have to tell the press. But it's just not true." Underoath toured extensively throughout Europe, Australia and Asia in the late 2006, from February to April in 2007 toured with Taking Back Sunday and Armor for Sleep.

Underoath shot videos for the songs "You're Ever So Inviting" and "A Moment Suspended in Time" in February 2007; both videos have been released and "You're Ever So Inviting" won MTV's Battle of the Videos on May 23, 2007. Underoath performed a Canadian tour followed by the Taste of Chaos World Tour, and also played at the 2007 Cornerstone Festival. On July 17, 2007, Underoath released their 777 DVD to the US market. Underoath also played the Warped Tour 2007 from July 24 to August 9, and in August 2007, toured Australia and East Asia. During a tour with Maylene and the Sons of Disaster, Poison the Well, and Every Time I Die, Gillespie went through emergency surgery on an infection in his hand. Instead of cancelling shows, Underoath recruited Kenny Bozich, the drummer of Gillespie's band, The Almost. Underoath lead vocalist Spencer Chamberlain was featured on the cover of the Warped Tour 2008 Tour Compilation album.

=== Lost in the Sound of Separation (2008–2009) ===
During the September 2007 tour, Chamberlain stated various times that the band will release a new album in mid-2008. It was later confirmed that it would be released on September 2, 2008. Recording for the album began in March 2008 and ended in April 2008. McTague said that the album, Lost in the Sound of Separation, would be considerably heavier than Define the Great Line.

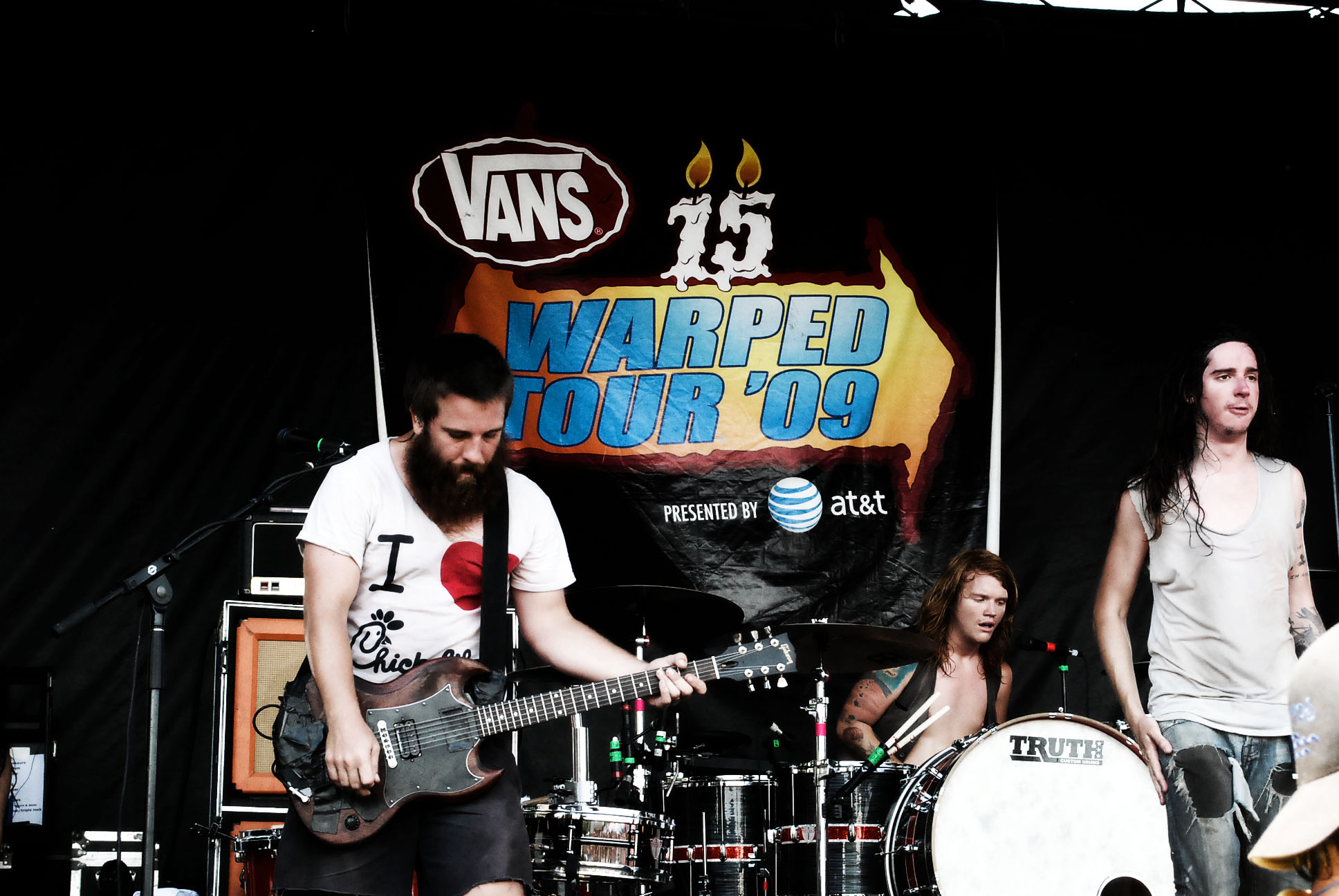
Underoath performing on the 2009 Warped Tour.

In October 2007, Underoath had begun filming their third person documentary Survive, Kaleidoscope. "The Audible Diversion Group", a small film team, shot footage of the band as they followed Underoath on their September tour and the entirety of the "We Believe in Dino-Tours". The film was shot in 720p high definition 16:9 widescreen format. Underoath released the Survive, Kaleidoscope live CD/DVD on May 27, 2008. The album opened at No. 81 on the Billboard 200. The band recorded the concert footage at a performance in Philadelphia at the Electric Factory in October 2007.

During mid-2008, Underoath joined the 30-city Rockstar Energy Mayhem Tour with bands such as Slipknot, Disturbed, Mastodon, and DragonForce. The tour began on July 9, 2008, and concluded in Buffalo, New York, on August 19, with Underoath headlining the tour's stop at the Hot Topic venue. After the release of Lost in the Sound of Separation on September 2, 2008, Underoath began headlining tour in support of the album, along with Saosin and The Devil Wears Prada, and in various markets, P.O.S, Person L, and The Famine.

In its first week, Lost in the Sound of Separation debuted at No. 8 on the Billboard 200 charts, selling around 56,000 copies in the US alone. In December 2008, Underoath won Best Hardcore/Screamo Artist at the Rock on Request Awards and embarked on their first South American Tour. The band played six concerts in Brazil, Argentina, Chile and Colombia, and played at Warped Tour 2009. On international tours in 2009, Underoath began writing pieces of new songs for their fifth studio release. The songs "Desperate Times, Desperate Measures" and "Too Bright to See, Too Loud to Hear" were released as the two singles from the album.

=== Departure of Aaron Gillespie and Ø (Disambiguation) (2010–2011) ===
During a late 2009 interview, guitarist Timothy McTague stated that the band had "just started writing songs that may be included on the next record", and that they are hoping to enter the studio late summer or early fall 2010. Underoath is set to release their live album Live at Koko exclusively to their UK audience via their UK merchandise site. On February 25, 2010, Underoath stated they were finishing writing their new album.

On April 5, 2010, the band announced the departure of their final founding member, drummer and vocalist, Aaron Gillespie. Gillespie played his final show with the band in Milan, Italy, on April 6.

On May 10, 2010, through their official MySpace blog, Underoath announced that they will be entering the studio on May 24 to record their follow up to Lost in the Sound of Separation, which was aimed to be released later that year, with producers Matt Goldman (Lost in the Sound of Separation and Define the Great Line) and Jeremy SH Griffith. Following the departure of Gillespie, Underoath recruited ex-Norma Jean drummer Daniel Davison for the recording of their new album. Davison's first tour with the band was "The Cool Tour" featuring As I Lay Dying and Blessthefall. The band then announced that the new album, Ø (Disambiguation), will be released on November 9, 2010, through Tooth & Nail Records. On September 9, 2010, it was announced that Underoath had signed to Roadrunner Records for worldwide distribution outside of the US and Canada.

On September 14, 2010, the band held a listening party for Ø (Disambiguation) at Swinghouse Studios in Los Angeles. Danny Sugimoto of spitInthemud.com remarked that the album "feels darker and more chaotic than ones prior, yet with a tasteful sense of calm mixed within."

Underoath embarked on their headlining November tour on the 2nd of the month. On November 23, vocalist, Spencer Chamberlain began to suffer from foodborne disease. His position in Underoath was substituted by Tyler Smith of The Word Alive for the show scheduled that day.

On October 18, 2011, a compilation, Play Your Old Stuff, was released, containing three previously released albums: The Changing of Times, They're Only Chasing Safety and Define the Great Line, along with new artwork.

=== Anthology, breakup, and farewell tour (2012–2013) ===
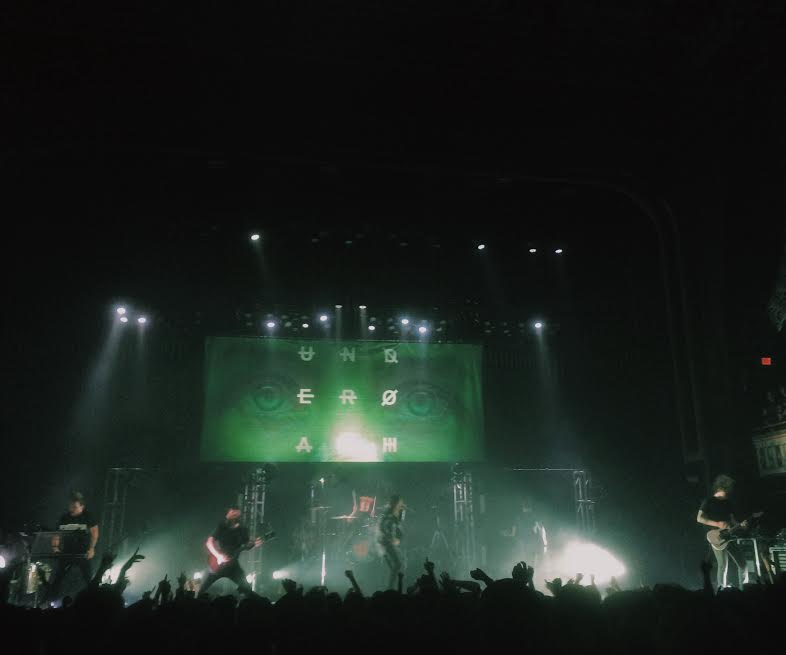
Underoath performing at the Tabernacle in Atlanta, Georgia on April 23, 2016

On October 2, 2012, the band announced through their Twitter account that they would be disbanding in 2013. In addition, the band released a career-spanning compilation album, Anthology: 1999–2013 on November 6, 2012.

On October 9, 2012, they announced their farewell tour with mewithoutYou, As Cities Burn, and letlive. as opening acts.

On January 26, 2013, Underoath played their final show at Jannus Live in St. Petersburg, Florida. Aaron Gillespie also performed on the songs Emergency Broadcast :: The End is Near and Reinventing Your Exit.

=== Post-breakup activities, reunion, and tours (2015–2017) ===
In January 2015, the band launched a campaign to finalize production of a documentary film, entitled "Tired Violence," about their farewell tour of 12 shows, posting three trailers to their YouTube channel.

In July 2015, Underoath began teasing the phrase "rebirth is coming" and an accompanying cryptic video across their social media accounts. The audio portion to the cryptic video, when played backwards, turned out to be the chorus for "It's Dangerous Business Walking Out Your Front Door" off the band's 2004 album They're Only Chasing Safety, and a countdown timer ending on August 24, 2015, later appeared on the band's website.

On August 17, 2015, the band's first show since disbanding in 2013 was announced, headlining the Self Help Fest in San Bernardino, California on March 19, 2016, along with A Day to Remember. In an interview article for Alternative Press, it was confirmed that the band was reuniting, including Gillespie's return to the lineup.

=== Erase Me, Voyeurist and The Place After This One (2018–present) ===
Erase Me was released via Fearless Records on April 6, 2018. The band released "Rapture", the second single from the album, on March 19. The band kicked off with the No Fix tour in support of the album in late April 2018 with Dance Gavin Dance. The lead single of the album, "On My Teeth", received a Grammy nomination for Best Metal Performance; it lost to High on Fire's "Electric Messiah".

The band supported Korn and Alice in Chains during a mid-2019 North American tour. On July 14, 2021, the band released "Damn Excuses", the lead single from their ninth album Voyeurist. The album marked their first in nearly four years, their longest gap between albums without breaking up. It was originally intended for release in October 2021, but was pushed back by three months due to vinyl production delays. On August 4, 2021, the band released the second single from the album, "Hallelujah".

On September 22, 2021, the band released the third single "Pneumonia" and revealed it was written exactly one year prior to release. The single was also partly inspired by the death of guitarist Tim McTague's father. Voyeurist was released on January 14, 2022. On March 28, 2023, guitarist James Smith was kicked out of the band after a 20-year tenure with the group. Underoath cited the reason for Smith's ouster being "differences that they weren't able to work out".

Underoath were the featured artist on three tracks in 2024: Bring Me the Horizon's "A Bullet w/ My Name On", Mitchell Tenpenny's "Demon or Ghost" and Des Rocs' "In The Night". The band also released three new singles throughout 2024: "Teeth" in September, "Survivors Guilt" in October, and "Generation No Surrender" in December. Also in December, at a concert in St. Petersburg, Florida, Dallas Taylor appeared on stage with Underoath and performed the song "When the Sun Sleeps" alongside all current members. All three of Underoath's 2024 singles feature on their tenth studio album, The Place After This One, which was released on March 28, 2025.

In February 2026, the band was announced as part of the lineup for the Louder Than Life music festival in Louisville, scheduled to take place in September. The band hinted at planning to write a new album for a 2027 release in an interview with Valentino Petrarca at The Aquarian.

== Musical style and influences ==
=== Christianity ===
Underoath's members identified as Christian in their earlier years and stated during that time period that they were a Christian band. However, as vocalist Spencer Chamberlain explained in 2006, "[We are Christian but] in a different way. We're not like your average Christian band." He explains that Christianity is the "backbone of our lives, especially in the way that we handle certain things, but it's not so much the backbone of our lyrics. It's not like every song is a lesson from the Bible or something. It's just normal life struggles." Keyboardist Christopher Dudley stated that a majority of Underoath's audience is not Christian, nor are the bands with whom they would often tour. Though the band has been noted for "setting precedent in both Christian rock and beyond", only a portion of their albums are sold in the Christian marketplace. Chamberlain said, "I look at us as just another band in the secular market like with all these other hardcore bands and we just happen to be a Christian band that has different beliefs." In an interview with Alternative Press, Drummer Aaron Gillespie stated that "I'm definitely a Christian, but I don't think Underoath should be a 'Christian band'". However, the band has since openly distanced themselves from Christianity and organized religion.

Upon releasing their comeback single, "On My Teeth", from Erase Me, the band's first song to feature profanity in their entire career, the band updated their Spotify profile to read "The band who once openly—and without apology—professed their faith-based worldview onstage nightly, have since moved beyond the realm of seemingly impenetrable polemics. At various junctures, Erase Me illustrates those moments of sanctuary, anxiety, betrayal, and conflict that inevitably arise when humanity grapples with belief systems." In a 2018 interview, Spencer Chamberlain stated that, "my journey and my role in playing in a Christian band, I held a huge burden and I got burnt badly and was treated awfully. I'm not saying religion is wrong for everyone, but for me it was wrong. It ruined my life, turned me into a drug addict and people were awful to me the whole time. I never felt more alone in my life than when I was Christian."

=== Genre ===
Underoath have been labeled as metalcore, post-hardcore, emo, screamo, and Christian metal. Loudwire designated the band as being among modern metalcore's "Big Four", along with Bring Me the Horizon, Architects and Parkway Drive.

The band's style has changed over the years, as explained by AllMusic: "since their inception, Florida's Underoath have evolved from a run-of-the-mill Christian metalcore band into a fluid, dynamic, and energized rock group that adeptly blends emotive melody, charged punk rock rhythms, and a chunky, engaging bottom end." Jesus Freak Hideout also took notice of this, mentioning in a review that "Underoath's sound has evolved a lot — from metal to emocore to straight-up hardcore."

As demonstrated on their first release, Act of Depression, Underoath initially played a combination of hardcore and metalcore mixed with and death metal. The band kept a similar sound on their second album, Cries of the Past, featuring occasional traces of black metal, but the band later moved away from this style to embrace a more melodic-leaning post-hardcore sound. On the follow up release, Underoath stood "at the heavy metal crossroads on The Changing of Times, a hardcore album that parallels classic arena rock." The band experimented with electronic elements, with Casey Boland of Alternative Press noting that the album "was an Olympic pole vault-like leap forward for Underoath," and that the band was "welcoming the process of evolution." He also noted the addition of Aaron Gillespie's sung singing, which offered "a compelling counterpoint and presaged a swarm of bands adopting the sing-scream dichotomy that would become the hallmark of 'screamo.'" Cross Rhythms noted the growing popularity of the band, and described them as playing "an interesting mix of hardcore and indie rock, utilising loops, keyboards, acoustic guitars and melodic vocal harmonies, amongst the onslaught of heavy guitars and screeching hardcore vocals."

Underoath underwent an extreme overhaul preceding their fourth release, They're Only Chasing Safety, with Dallas Taylor and Octavio Fernandez leaving the band and Spencer Chamberlain taking over lead vocal duties. This marked a radical shift for Underoath, "as the band ditched its formerly metal leanings for the decidedly friendly confines of screamo," a change with ignited a debate over which was better, "old" or "new" Underoath. A review by Alex Henderson of AllMusic classifies the album under an alternative rock style which could be described as screamo, post-hardcore, or melodic hardcore, and which differed from full-out metalcore. In another review, Andrew Segal of Cross Rhythms described the album as nu metal, and said that, while on the heavier side of the rock scale, the album is well produced and "shows more signs of intelligence than the [nu-metal] genre is often credited with."

For their fifth album, Define the Great Line, Underoath abandoned the pop choruses of the previous album and instead demonstrated a heavier and more eclectic style, updating their sound with "weird" time changes and ambient post-metal passages. According to Sputnikmusic, while the album is basically a modern metalcore recording, it incorporated other influences including post-metal guitar leads on several tracks and ambient electronica on tracks such as "Salmarnir". AllMusic stated that the band found the "delicate middle ground between throat-shredding grindcore and My Chemical Romance/From Autumn to Ashes-style emo-punk," and Cross Rhythms described the album as "an impressively versatile project where metal riffs and emo breakdowns, screamo noise and memorable hooks collide in a veritable sonic feast."

Underoath's sixth album, Lost in the Sound of Separation, established Spencer Chamberlain as the band's frontman and saw the band incorporating some industrial elements. With the departure of the last original member of Underoath, Aaron Gillespie, the band underwent their "biggest shift in sound for the band in a long time." Ø (Disambiguation) featured a darker and more immersive approach than their previous albums, and used a heavy atmospheric and ambient sound and also utilized groove sections on some tracks. Erase Me, the band's comeback album, saw more of an emphasis on alternative rock.

=== Influences ===
Underoath's stated influences have included Poison the Well, Hopesfall, Thrice, Mars Volta, Joy Division, Smashing Pumpkins, Beloved, Norma Jean, Overcome, Taking Back Sunday, Nine Inch Nails, Dillinger Escape Plan, Glassjaw, Botch, Refused, At the Drive-In, Jimmy Eat World, Radiohead, Living Sacrifice and Isis, with guitarist Timothy McTague describing At the Drive-In in particular as "probably one of the biggest influences" on the band. With the departure of Dallas Taylor following The Changing of Times, an album that foreshadowed the changes to come for the band, the group's style took a new direction courtesy of new vocalist Spencer Chamberlain. Beginning with They're Only Chasing Safety, the writing dynamic changed in the band, as Chamberlain and drummer/vocalist Aaron Gillespie now wrote all the lyrics they sang. On Define the Great Line, Chamberlain noted that his vocals now sounded less like an imitation of Taylor and more like the vocals of his previous band, This Runs Through. Alternative Press wrote of the album, "[Chamberlain's] bellow [is] more carnal and guttural, [and] his high end more tuneful than whiny."

== Band members ==
Underoath live at Rock am Ring 2019

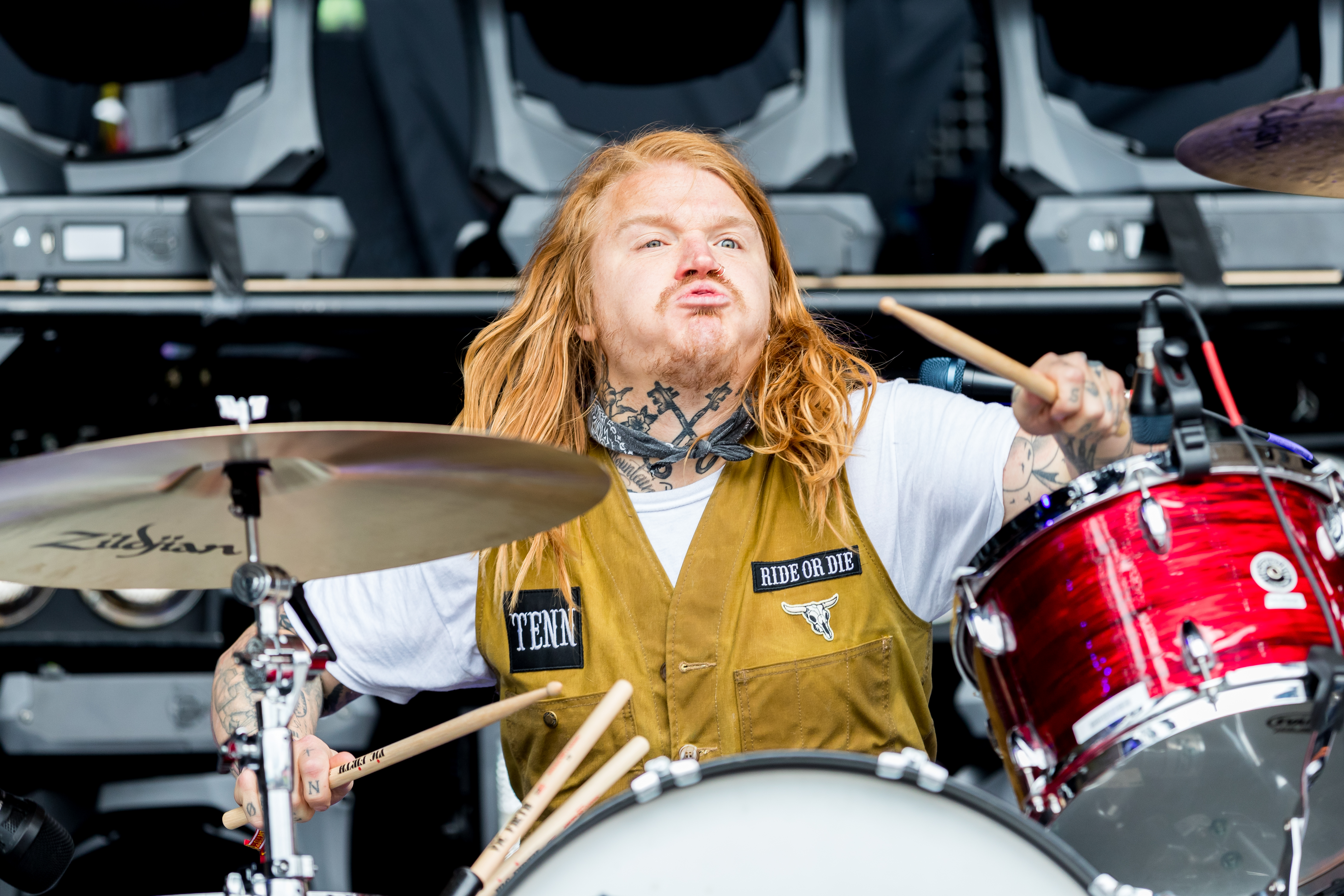
Aaron Gillespie

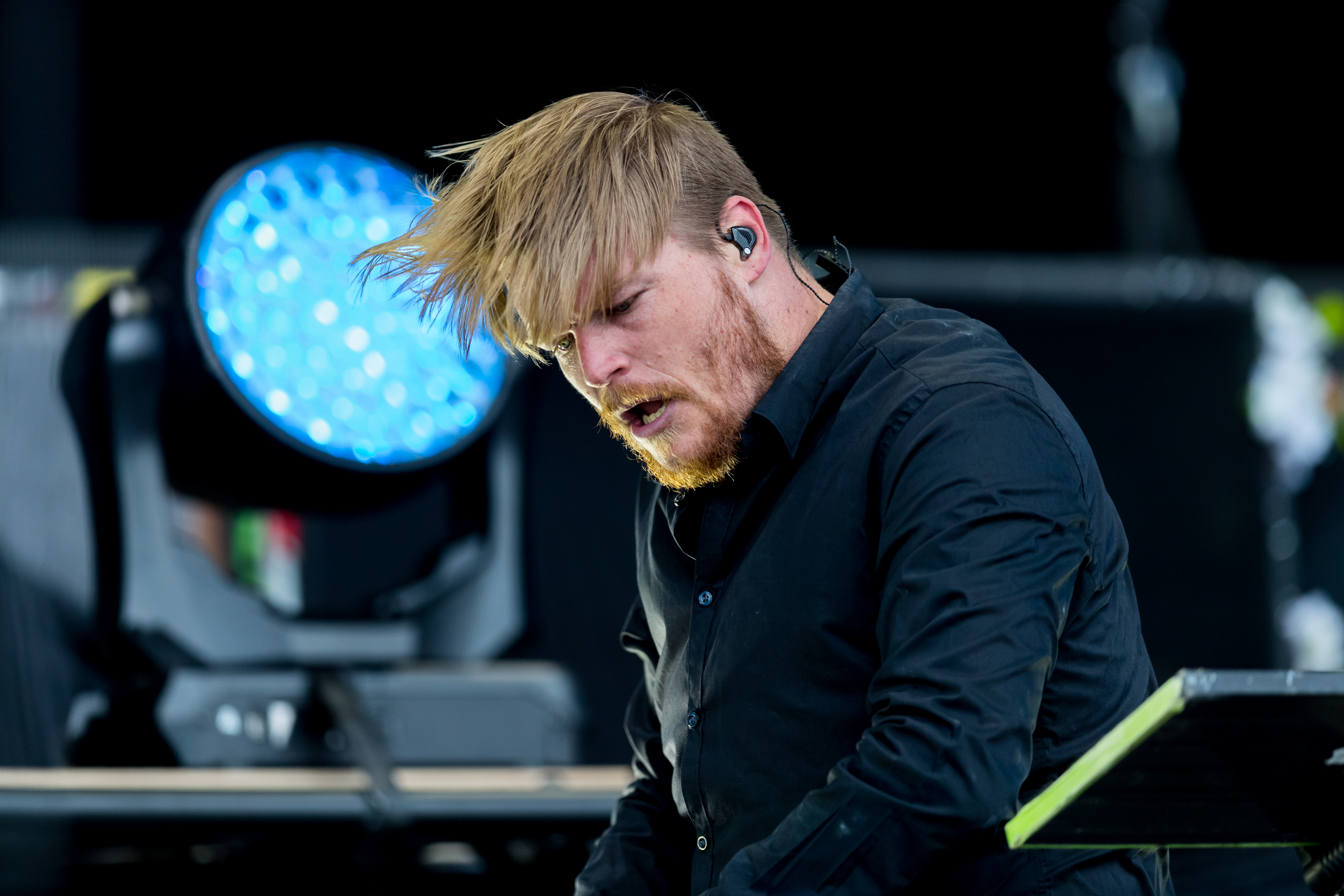
Christopher Dudley

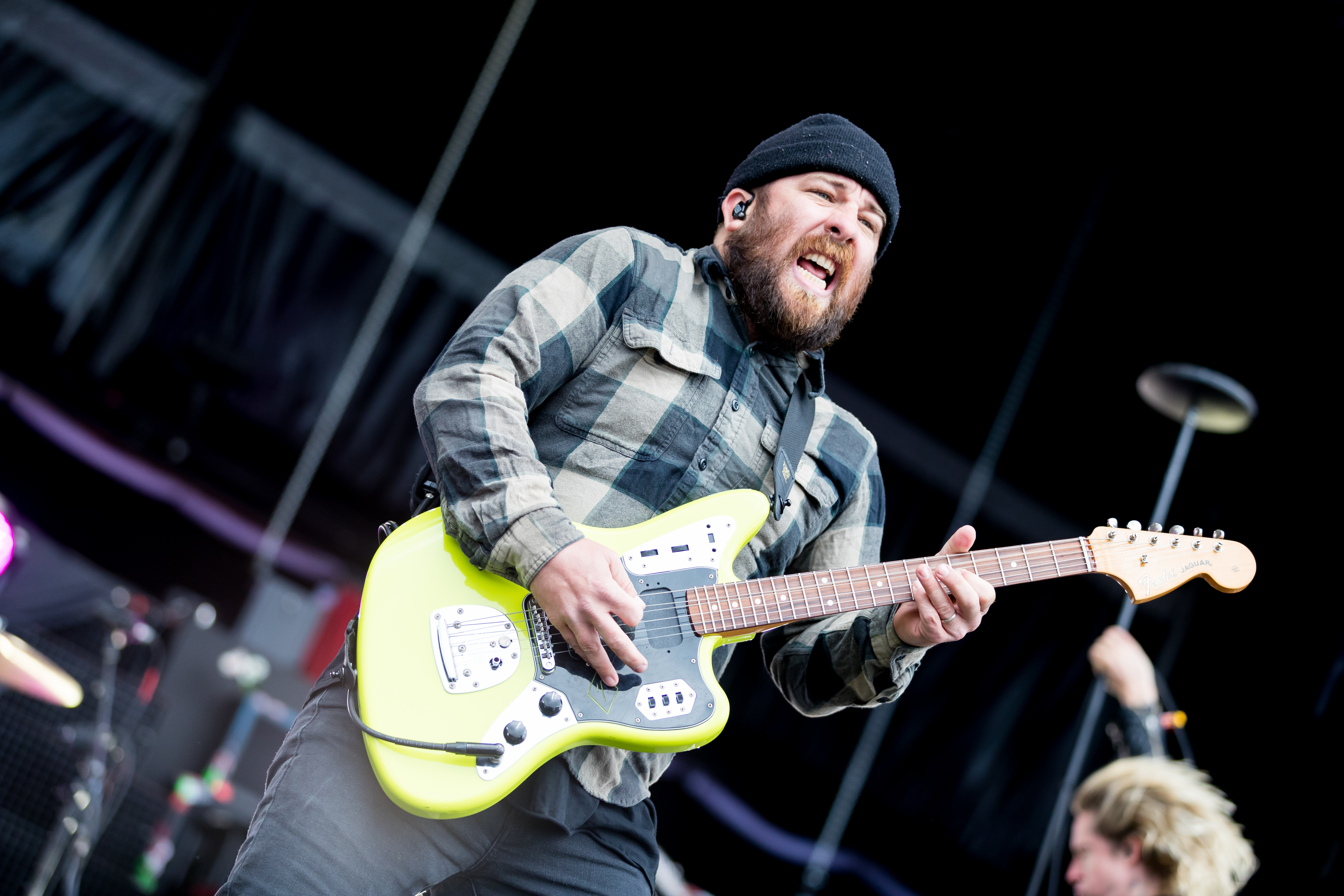
Timothy McTague

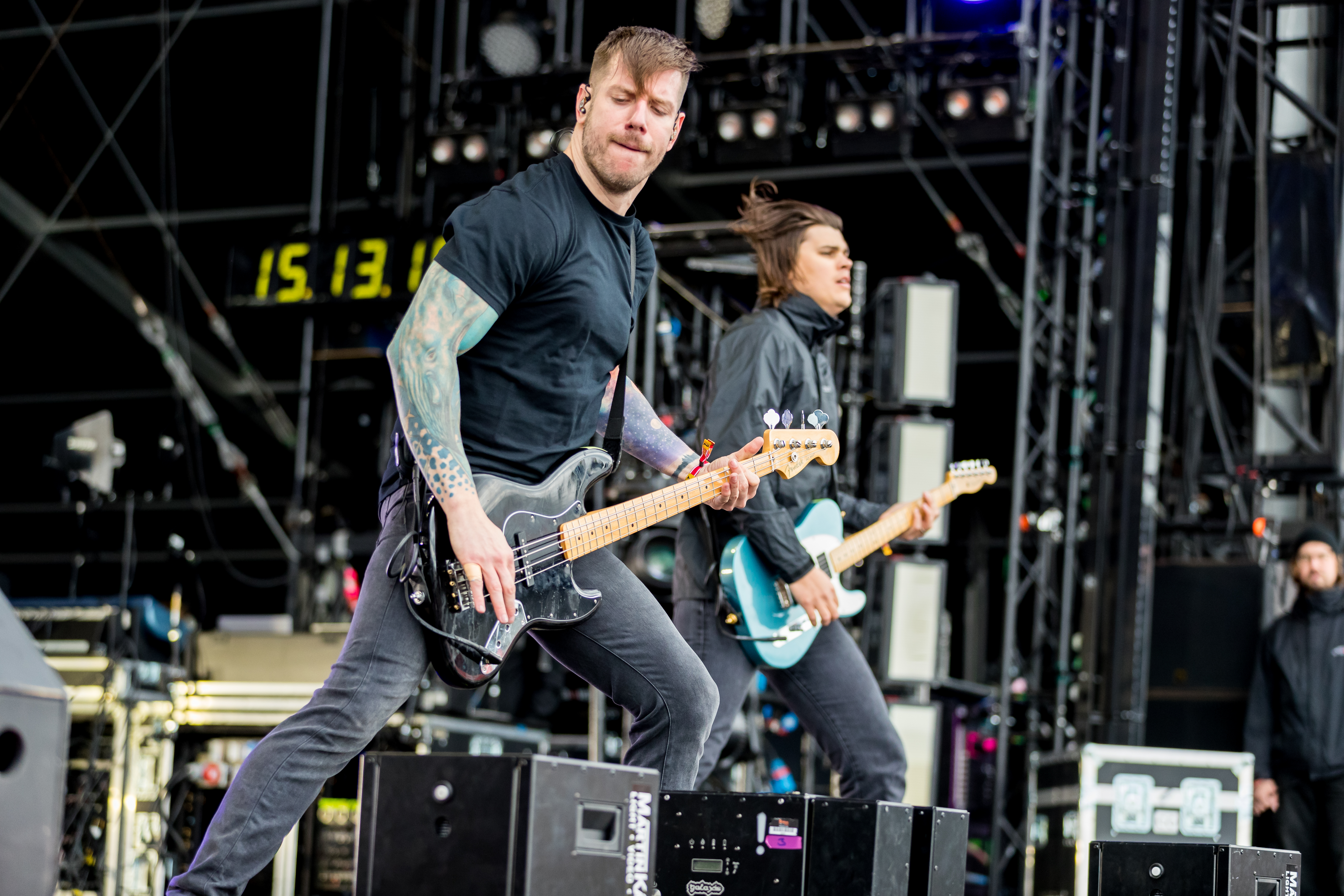
Grant Brandell (left) and James Smith

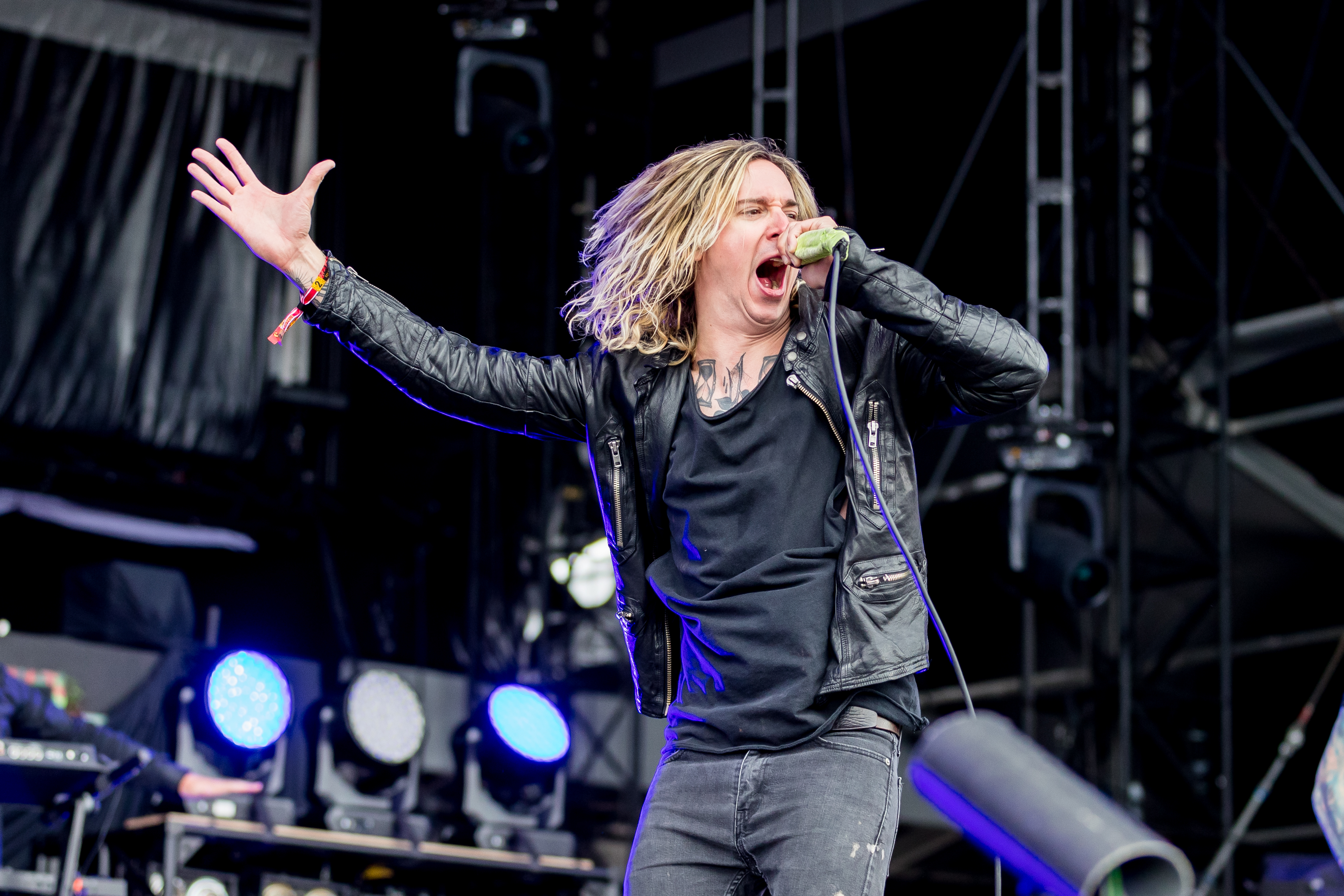
Spencer Chamberlain

Current

- Aaron Gillespie – drums, clean vocals (1997–2010, 2015–present)
- Christopher Dudley – keyboards, synthesizer, sampler, programming (2000–2013, 2015–present)
- Timothy McTague – guitar, backing vocals (2001–2013, 2015–present)
- Grant Brandell – bass (2002–2013, 2015–present)
- Spencer Chamberlain – lead vocals (2003–2013, 2015–present)

== Discography ==
Studio albums

- Act of Depression (1999)
- Cries of the Past (2000)
- The Changing of Times (2002)
- They're Only Chasing Safety (2004)
- Define the Great Line (2006)
- Lost in the Sound of Separation (2008)
- Ø (Disambiguation) (2010)
- Erase Me (2018)
- Voyeurist (2022)
- The Place After This One (2025)
