= Just You and Me (album) =

Studio album by Adie
- Released: 9 March 2010
- Studio: Yackland Studio (Nashville, Tennessee)
- Genre: Contemporary Christian music, Christian rock
- Length: 43:03
- Label: BEC Recordings
- Producer: Marc Byrd; Steve Hindalong

Adie chronology
Don't Wait (2006)	Just You and Me (2010)

Professional ratings
Review scores
Source	Rating
Jesus Freak Hideout	2.5/5 stars

Just You and Me is the second solo studio album released by Adie on 9 March 2010.

== Track listing ==
No.	Title	Writer(s)	Length
1.	"Where Could I Go"	Marc Byrd, Sarah Reeves, Sarah Hart	4:10
2.	"All I Need Is You"	Marty Sampson	4:13
3.	"Beautiful Lord"	Leeland Dayton Mooring, Byrd	4:34
4.	"Love Come Down (Reach)"	Byrd, Robbie Seay, Hart	4:39
5.	"Soon"	Brooke Ligertwood	4:24
6.	"Seek You"	Suzanna Pautz	2:57
7.	"Shelter"	Scott Cunningham	4:02
8.	"Redemption Song"	Byrd, Hart, Doug McKelvey	3:52
9.	"Oh You Bring"	Matt Crocker	4:35
10.	"Only You"	David Crowder, Mike Dodson, Jason Solley, Mike Hogan	5:41
Total length:			43:03

== Personnel ==
- Adie Camp – all vocals
- Ben Shive – keyboards
- Stephen Lewerke – keyboards, guitars
- Marc Byrd – guitars
- Chris Donahue – bass
- Ken Lewis – drums, percussion
- Steve Hindalong – percussion
- Matt Slocum – cello

=== Production ===
- Brandon Ebel – executive producer
- Tyson Paoletti – executive producer
- Marc Byrd – producer
- Steve Hindalong – producer
- Stephen Lewerke – engineer, mixing
- Troy Glessner – mastering at Spectre Studios (Tacoma, Washington)
- Ryan Clark – design
- Laura Dart – photography
