= The Almost =

American rock band

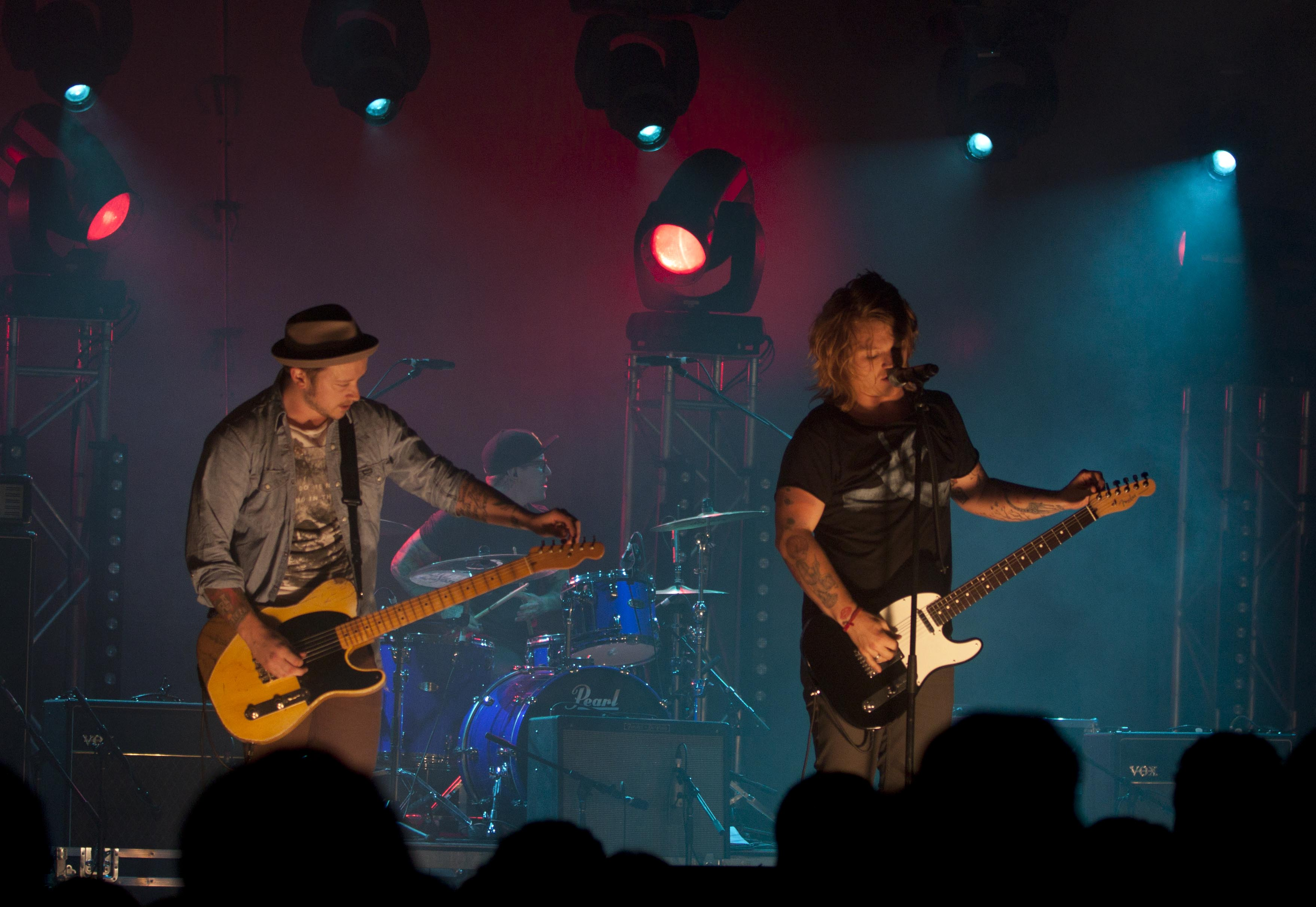
- The Almost performing in Sydney, Australia in 2011. From left to right, Dusty Redmon, Joe Musten (back), and Aaron Gillespie.

Background information
- Origin: Clearwater, Florida, U.S.
- Genres: Post-hardcore; pop rock; alternative rock; emo; post-grunge; CCM; alternative CCM
- Years active: 2005–2015, 2018–present
- Labels: Virgin, Tooth & Nail, Fearless
- Spinoff of: Underoath
- Members: Aaron Gillespie; Jay Vilardi; JJ Revell; Jon Thompson
- Past members: Kenny Bozich; Nick D'Amico; Alex Aponte; Joe Musten; Dusty Redmon
- Website: thealmost.com

The Almost is an American rock band from Clearwater, Florida, fronted by Underoath drummer and vocalist Aaron Gillespie. Formed in 2005 as a solo project by Gillespie, the band currently includes guitarist Jay Vilardi, bassist Jon Thompson, and drummer JJ Revell. They released three albums via Tooth & Nail Records: their debut Southern Weather (2007), Monster Monster (2009), and Fear Inside Our Bones (2013). Following a hiatus in 2015, Gillespie revived the project and released a fourth album, Fear Caller, in 2019 through Fearless Records.

== History ==
=== Formation (2005–2007) ===
While the exact formation date of the project is unknown, in October 2005, Underoath drummer/vocalist Aaron Gillespie created a Myspace page for The Almost, eventually uploading two demo songs, "I Mostly Like to Copy Other People" and "They Say You Can Never Write I Told You So in a Song But Here I Go" (later retitled "Never Say I Told You So"). Around this time, Gillespie and The Starting Line's Kenny Vasoli collaborated on the song "Yule Be Sorry", which was featured on the Tooth & Nail compilation album Happy Christmas Vol. 4. All of the initial Almost songs were written by Gillespie while recording Define the Great Line with Underoath.

=== Southern Weather (2007–2008) ===
The Almost embarked on the "It's All Happening" tour from December 17 to January 20, 2006, with Gillespie joined by guitarists Dusty Redmon and Jay Vilardi, bassist Alex Aponte, and drummer Kenny Bozich. The tour showcased new songs from the band's upcoming debut album Southern Weather. In 2007, The Almost embarked on Paramore's headlining tour, RIOT!, alongside The Starting Line and Set Your Goals (who played for the first half of the tour.) In addition, the group went on tour with Emery, Envy On The Coast, and Army of Me for all of June and parts of July. In May they also released the B-side song 'Hold On', which was originally only available as a bonus track on iTunes. The Almost released their first music video for "Say This Sooner" on March 19, 2007, premiering on MTV2's UNLEASHED.

Southern Weather was released on April 3, 2007 through Tooth & Nail, having been recorded in February and March 2006. Gillespie played nearly every main instrument on the album, with the exception of Vasoli contributing bass to two songs. The album reached No. 39 on the Billboard 200 and No. 1 on the Top Christian Albums chart.

Shortly after the announcement of a new EP, it was announced in November 2007 via the band's Myspace that Bozich had left the group. Guitarist Dusty Redmon explained in an AbsolutePunk forum post: "Kenny quit. He's getting married and didn't want to tour at all. It happens..it's happened to me twice with Beloved and Dead Poetic. It's a personal choice and we're cool with it. He was going to be playing drums on the next record, but made the choice to not be in a band at this point in his life. No big deal."

=== No Gift to Bring and Monster Monster (2008–2011) ===
A cover of "Little Drummer Boy" was made available for streaming on November 4, 2008, followed by "Awful Direction" on November 20. The Almost released a new EP titled No Gift to Bring on November 24. It was originally going to release it on November 25, but they changed the date to the day before. The EP was released to tide fans over until the release of their next album in the Summer/Fall of 2009. It included "Awful Direction", "Little Drummer Boy", a cover of Casting Crowns's "Your Love Is Extravagant", a new version of "Amazing, Because It Is", and an exclusive mix of "Dirty and Left Out". The EP was almost entirely recorded by Gillespie and produced by Underoath guitarist Tim McTague, who also created the remix of "Dirty and Left Out."

In May 2008, Gillespie announced that The Almost would be entering the studio in the winter of 2008 to record their follow-up to Southern Weather. In a November 2008 episode of the Tooth & Nail Records podcast, he stated that "the new album will be more of a complete band effort". The band went into the studio at the beginning of May, recording in Nashville TN. Monster Monster was released through Tooth & Nail/Virgin on November 3, 2009 featuring the singles "Lonely Wheel" and "Hands". There are several bonus tracks for this album. Users who downloaded Monster Monster from iTunes received the bonus track "Me And Alone". The fan pack version of the album sold exclusively at Best Buy contained the tracks "West" and "Wrong". The Monster EP contained two bonus tracks entitled "July" and "Birmingham". The album charted at No. 67 on the Billboard 200 and No. 3 on the Christian Album charts.

In February 2010 the Almost played the Australian Soundwave Festival. The Almost toured across Australia nationally playing alongside the three festival headliners; Faith No More, Jimmy Eat World and Jane's Addiction, as well as other bands such as Paramore, All Time Low, A Day To Remember, Escape The Fate, Enter Shikari, Meshuggah, Anthrax, Trivium, Whitechapel, Set Your Goals and other alternative, rock, metalcore and hardcore bands. Along with Soundwave, The Almost played club shows in Melbourne and Sydney with All Time Low and Dance Gavin Dance. On July 31, 2010, the Almost played at iMatter Festival in Elmira, New York alongside Secret and Whisper, August Burns Red, Oh, Sleeper, MyChildren MyBride, Texas in July and The Glorious Unseen. On October 25, 2010, the Almost released the Monster Monster EP, which contained the five bonus tracks and the music videos for "Lonely Wheel", "Hands", "No I Don't" and "Monster Monster" from Monster Monster.

=== Fear Inside Our Bones and hiatus (2011–2015) ===
During their set at the O2 Experience in Denver on June 1, Aaron Gillespie announced that an upcoming third album would be titled Fear Inside Our Bones. Gillespie later announced via Twitter that the band had finished recording the album in full as of June 10, 2012, It was announced in January 2013 that the new album would be released on April 16, 2013 via Tooth & Nail Records. Accompanying the announcement was a song premiere of the single "Ghost".

On April 1, 2013, the band posted on their Facebook page that the album had been pushed back to June 2013, due to Tooth & Nail becoming an independent record label. The album was ultimately released on June 11, 2013, reaching No. 142 on the Billboard 200 and No. 5 on the Christian Albums chart.

During an interview on Emery's BadChristian Podcast in September 2015, Gillespie stated that he had "put the Almost to bed. ... It's on the back burner right now". He cited his busy schedule (as Paramore's touring drummer, a solo artist, and a producer) and the schedules of the other band members.

=== Fear Caller (2018–present) ===
Gillespie was inspired to begin songwriting for a new album during Underoath's spring 2018 tour. Fear Caller, the band's Fearless Records debut album, was recorded in the desert. Gillespie posted a teaser video that eventually led to the announcement of the band's record deal and a new single and album. The single, titled "Chokehold", was released along with a music video on September 25, 2019. Fear Caller was released one month later, on October 18, 2019.

== Band members ==
Current members

- Aaron Gillespie – lead vocals, rhythm guitar, keyboards, percussion (2005–2015; 2018-present), lead guitar (2005–2007; 2024–present), bass, drums (2005–2007)
- Jay Vilardi – lead guitar, backing vocals (2007–2015; 2018-present), rhythm guitar (2007–2015; 2018-2019, 2024–present)
- Jon Thompson – bass (2010–present)
- JJ Revell – drums, percussion (2018–present)

Former members

- Dusty Redmon – lead guitar, backing vocals (2007–2015; 2018-2019)
- Alex Aponte – bass (2007–2010)
- Kenny Bozich – drums, percussion (2007–2008)
- Nick D'Amico – rhythm and lead guitar (2007)
- Joe Musten – drums, percussion (2008–2015)

Timeline

== Discography ==
=== Studio albums ===
Year	Details	Chart					
Year	Details	US 200	US Christian	US Hard Rock	US Digital	US Rock	US Alternative
2007	Southern Weather: Released: April 3, 2007; Label: Tooth & Nail, Virgin	39	1	19	39	10	—
2009	Monster Monster: Released: November 3, 2009; Label: Tooth & Nail, Virgin	67	3	—	22	26	20
2013	Fear Inside Our Bones: Released: June 11, 2013; Label: Tooth & Nail	142	5	—	—	44	—
2019	Fear Caller: Released: October 18, 2019; Label: Fearless Records	—	—	—	—	—	—

=== EPs ===
Year	Details	Chart	
Year	Details	US Christian	US Holiday
2008	No Gift to Bring: Released: November 25, 2008; Label: Tooth & Nail	36	31
2009	Monster EP: Released: October 6, 2009; Label: Tooth & Nail	—	—
2010	Monster Monster EP: Released: October 25, 2010; Label: Tooth & Nail	—	—

=== Demos ===
Year	Details
2005	The Almost Demos: Released: December 2005; Label: Independent

=== Singles ===
List of singles, with selected chart positions, showing year released and album name
Title	Year	Peak chart positions				Album
Title	Year	US	US Alt.	US Main. Rock	US Christ.	Album
"Say This Sooner"	2007	111	7	35	—	Southern Weather
"Southern Weather"	2007	—	44	—	—	Southern Weather
"Lonely Wheel"	2009	—	—	—	—	Monster Monster
"Hands"	2009	—	—	—	32	Monster Monster
"Free Fallin'"	2010	—	—	—	—	Punk Goes Classic Rock
"I'm Down"	2013	—	—	—	—	Fear Inside Our Bones
"Chokehold"	2019	—	—	—	—	Fear Caller
"—" denotes a recording that did not chart or was not released in that territory.

=== Music videos ===
Year	Song	Album
2007	"Say This Sooner"	Southern Weather
2007	"Southern Weather"	Southern Weather
2009	"Lonely Wheel"	Monster Monster
2009	"Little Drummer Boy"	No Gift to Bring
2009	"Hands"	Monster Monster
2010	"No I Don't"	Monster Monster
2010	"Monster Monster"	Monster Monster
2014	"I'm Down"	Fear Inside Our Bones
2019	"Chokehold"	Fear Caller
