= Fear Inside Our Bones =

Studio album by The Almost
- Released: June 11, 2013
- Genre: Alternative rock; indie rock; alternative country; post-hardcore
- Length: 41:16
- Label: Tooth & Nail
- Producer: The Almost, Marshall Altman

The Almost chronology
Monster Monster (2009)	Fear Inside Our Bones (2013)	Fear Caller (2019)

Fear Inside Our Bones is the third studio album by alternative rock band The Almost, who also produced the album with Marshall Altman. It was released on June 11, 2013 by Tooth & Nail Records and was met with both commercial success and critical acclaim.

== Music and lyrics ==
Kim Jones of About.com told that this was "more classic rock." At CCM Magazine, Matt Conner agreed in writing that "Fear Inside Our Bones is a fantastic rock-and-roll affair that shows just how much Gillespie has matured." Christian Music Zine's Tyler Hess noted that "there isn't just a single here or there that will help sell it on the radio, this is a solid, guitar-wailing, cymbal-clashing, ethereal rock album that must be listened to from beginning to end." In addition, Hess wrote that this release was "full of gritty rock and rules madness". At HM, Doug Van Pelt felt that "The Almost might've committed a scene faux pas by rocking out so hard in such a straight-forward way, but if the audience will listen, the energy invoked on these 11 tracks has a great chance of strengthening their fanbase." Michael Weaver of Jesus Freak Hideout stated that the release "has even more of a stark difference from its predecessors. Much of the album features a southern sound; it even has some alt-country at times. The album also contains a bit of a 90s alternative feel as well."

At Kill Your Stereo, Rob Foster found that "The new recording style has given the band a far darker, grittier, and more intense sound than they've had on previous records, and it only serves to do good for them." Melodic.net's Johan Wippsson wrote that "Gone are the punk and emo influences as the alternative rock has taken all the space this time even if you can find some power-pop traces here and there." At Revolver, Meghan Traynor told that the album contained "candid lyrics", and that the album had a penchant for delivering "thundering rhythms and crunchy guitars fans will love, at times even tapping into the pop-rock effervescence of the Foo Fighters." Rock Sound called the music "expectedly succinct", and doing this "With a fine balance of delicate melodies, rhythmic guitars and raw emotion, there are plenty of songs with the same atmospheric sounds". At Outburn, Nathaniel Lay evoked that "this collection is track after track of gritty, powerful rock 'n' roll."

== Release ==
In March 2013, the group supported Finch on their US tour. "I'm Down" was released to radio on June 4. Fear Inside Our Bones was released on June 11 by Tooth & Nail Records.

== Critical reception ==
Professional ratings
Review scores
Source	Rating
About.com	4.5/5 stars
CCM Magazine	5/5 stars
Christian Music Zine	4.5/5 stars
HM	3.5/5 stars
Jesus Freak Hideout	4.5/5 stars
Kill Your Stereo	70/100
Melodic	4/5 stars
Outburn	9/10
Revolver	3.5/5 stars
Rock Sound	7/10

Fear Inside Our Bones garnered critical acclaim from the eleven music critics to review the album. Kim Jones at About.com noted that this release was "satisfying, well-developed and natural." At CCM Magazine, Matt Conner proclaimed that "the Almost never sounded better." Christian Music Zine's Tyler Hess called this "an album lover's album" that he did not know if the band "set out to save rock and roll from the clutches of inane pop music, but they may have just done it anyway with one of the best albums of the year so far". At HM, Doug Van Pelt told that "The process translates into an energetic album." Michael Weaver of Jesus Freak Hideout proclaimed this to be "a fantastic sounding record", which "The Almost have produced a stellar product that has the ability to excite current fans and gain new listeners, but it also has the slight possibility of alienating some as well." Also of Jesus Freak Hideout. Roger Gelwicks called this release "an engaging and truly unique effort."

Rob Foster of Kill Your Stereo told that "Aside from the brief dip in the middle, it's a very well done record", and called it "pretty great album". Melodic.net's Johan Wippsson felt that the release was "clearly their best album with stronger songs and a more defined style." Furthermore, Wippsson stated that he did not have anything "negative to say about Fear Inside Your Bones", which he thought that it "is a very good album if you like straightforward, catchy and uncomplicated alternative rock!" At Revolver, Meghan Traynor wrote that "most raw and organic album yet" because it was recorded live in the studio. Rock Sound noted that "while not entirely memorable, 'Fear Inside Our Bones' is an easy-to-listen-to, worthwhile listen." At Outburn, Nathaniel Lay wrote that "The Almost has put a lot of heart and honest effort into these songs, and it places Fear Inside Our Bones above Monster, Monster."

== Commercial performance ==
For the Billboard charting week of June 29, 2013, the album was No. 142 on the Billboard 200 best-selling albums chart, No. 5 on the Top Christian Albums chart, No. 27 on the Top Independent Albums chart and No. 44 on the Top Rock Albums chart.

== Track listing ==
All tracks are written by The Almost.

Tracklist
No.	Title	Length
1.	"Ghost"	3:41
2.	"Fear Inside Our Bones"	4:07
3.	"I'm Down"	3:05
4.	"Never Be Like You"	3:15
5.	"Come On"	3:52
6.	"The Florida Sun"	4:33
7.	"Fight Song"	3:36
8.	"I Won't Let Go"	4:00
9.	"So What"	3:20
10.	"Love Is Coming Down"	3:22
11.	"Lonely Boy"	4:29
Total length:		41:16

== Chart performance ==
Chart (2013)	Peak position
US Billboard 200	142
US Christian Albums (Billboard)	5
US Independent Albums (Billboard)	27
US Top Rock Albums (Billboard)	44
