= China white =

China white, China White or Chinawhite may refer to:

- China white (drug), an analog of fentanyl that resembles heroin

== Arts and entertainment ==
=== Music ===
- China White (band), a Huntington Beach, California punk rock band
- "China White", a song by Scorpions on the album Blackout
- Songs by He Is Legend:
  - "China White" on the album I Am Hollywood
  - "China White II" on the album Suck Out the Poison
  - "China White III" on the album It Hates You
- "China White (Ten Buck Fuck)" on the Hard Core Logo soundtrack
- Songs by Dog Fashion Disco:
  - "China White" on the album Erotic Massage
  - "China White" on the European release of the album Committed to a Bright Future
- "China White" on the album Hoy-Hoy! by Little Feat
- Chyna Whyte, American rapper, songwriter and author

=== Other uses in arts and entertainment ===
- China White (film), a 1989 Chinese film
- Chinawhite (nightclub), London
- China White (character), a villain in DC Comics

== See also ==
- Chinese white, zinc oxide used as a pigment
