= Change My Ways =

Change My Ways may refer to:

- Change My Ways, EP by Antiskeptic
- "Change My Ways", song by Kodak Black from Project Baby 2
- "Change My Ways", song by Galactic from Crazyhorse Mongoose
- "Change My Ways", song by Headstones from Love + Fury
- "Change My Ways", song by Flunk from Personal Stereo
- "Change My Ways", song by Ian Gillan from Memoirs of a Common Man
- "Change My Ways", song by Canned Heat from Hallelujah
- "Change My Ways", song by Stuck Moji from Snappin' Necks
- "Change My Ways", song by Antiskeptic from One Eye to Morocco
- "Change My Ways", song by The Pietasters from All Day
- "Change My Ways", song by Jordan Knight from Jordan Knight
- "Change My Ways", song by Leehom Wang from Change Me
