= Receiving Transmission =

Studio album by One Dollar Short
- Released: July 2004
- Studio: Powerhouse Studios
- Label: Rapido / Festival Mushroom
- Producer: Phillip McKellar

One Dollar Short chronology
Eight Days Away (2002)	Receiving Transmission (2004)	Unforgotten Songs (2020)

Singles from Receiving Transmission
- 1. "Some Assembly Required" Released: June 2004

Receiving Transmission is the second and final studio album by Australian punk rock band One Dollar Short. It was released in July 2004 and peaked at number 55 on the ARIA Charts.

== Track listing ==
Standard tracklist

1. "Some Assembly Required"
2. "Mayakovsky Had a Gun"
3. "Headlights"
4. "Seven Colours"
5. "Note to Self..."
6. "Broken/Fixed"
7. "Taste of Romance"
8. "Astronauts Journal"
9. "Engines Failed"
10. "Goodbye (Is Not Enough)"
11. "We Are Not Science"

The B Sides Bonus Disc

1. "Untitled"
2. "Silver Spoons"
3. "Here I Am"
4. "Keepsake"
5. "Tim's Brother"
6. "Friend"
7. "Not Pretty Enough" (Kasey Chambers)
8. "After the Fire"
9. "Starry Night"
10. "A Measure of Stride"
11. "Robot"
- Tracks "Silver Spoons" & "Not Pretty Enough" from the "10 Years" single (2002).
- Tracks "Here I Am" & "Robot" from the Press and Hold EP (2001).
- Tracks "Untitled", "Keepsake", "After the Fire" & "A Measure of Stride" from the "Keepsake" single (2003).
- Tracks "Tim's Brother" & "Starry Night" from the Board Game EP (2001).
- Track "Friend" from the "Is This the Part?" single (2002).

== Charts ==
Chart performance for Receiving Transmission
Chart (2004)	Peak position
Australian Albums (ARIA)	55

== Release history ==
Region	Date	Format	Edition(s)	Label	Catalogue
Australia / New Zealand	July 2004	CD; Digital download	Standard	Rapido / Festival Mushroom	338082
Australia / New Zealand	July 2004	CD + CD-ROM	Limited Edition with The B Sides Bonus Disc	Rapido / Festival Mushroom	338085
