= Stutterfly =

Canadian post-hardcore band

- Origin: Kelowna, British Columbia, Canada
- Genres: Alternative metal; post-hardcore; nu metal; alternative rock; emo; metalcore
- Years active: 1998–2007
- Label: Maverick Records (2004-2007)
- Members: Jordan Chase; Bradyn Byron; Jason Ciolli; Ryan Loerke; Charles David Furney
- Past members: Chris Stickney; Craig Langerud
- Website: Stutterfly Myspace

Stutterfly was a Canadian rock band formed in 1998, in Kelowna, British Columbia, Canada, with four members: Chris Stickney (vocals), Jordan Chase (bass, vocals), Bradyn Byron (guitar, vocals), and Craig Langerud (drums). In 2003, Jason Ciolli (lead guitar) joined the band, and the next year Ryan Loerke took over on drums. 2007 saw Stickney leave the band and after recruiting vocalist Charles Furney the band decided to form Secret and Whisper rather than carry on under the Stutterfly banner.

== History ==
Stutterfly was well established at MP3.com and was a popular download. With the help of Los Angeles–based Freeze Management, Stutterfly made a deal with Madonna's Maverick Records in the summer of 2004, and later toured with fellow labelmates Story of the Year.

Stutterfly's second full-length album And We Are Bled of Color was released in 2005. Music videos were produced for the songs "Gun in Hand" and "Fire Whispers". And We Are Bled of Color was a commercial disappointment, selling less than 100,000 copies. Stutterfly was dropped from Maverick, with lead singer Chris Stickney leaving the band amicably in August 2007. Charles Furney, formerly of thebleedingalarm, joined as the new vocalist later in 2007.

On Stutterfly's Facebook page they announced that Stutterfly is no longer a band. Former members of the band including Byron, Chase, Ciolli and Loerke continued to work together under the Secret and Whisper. The band went on hiatus in 2011 but was resurrected in 2022. Chase and Loerke now play in Shreddy Krueger together along with fellow Secret and Whisper member David Ecker. Stickney now plays in Shapes and Shadows, formerly known as Oceans Apart.

== Band Members ==
Final Lineup

- Charles David Furney - lead vocals (2007)
- Bradyn Byron - rhythm guitar, backing vocals (1998-2007), lead guitar (1998-2003)
- Jason Ciolli - lead guitar (2003-2007)
- Jordan Chase - bass guitar, backing Vocals (1998-2007)
- Ryan Loerke - drums, percussion (2004-2007)

Past Members

- Chris Stickney - lead vocals (1998-2007)
- Craig Lagerund - drums, percussion (1998-2004)

== Discography ==
Year	Title	Type
1998	Descent	Demo
2000	Hollow	Extended play
2002	Broken In Pieces...	Studio album
2005	And We Are Bled of Color	Studio album
