= He Is Legend =

American rock band

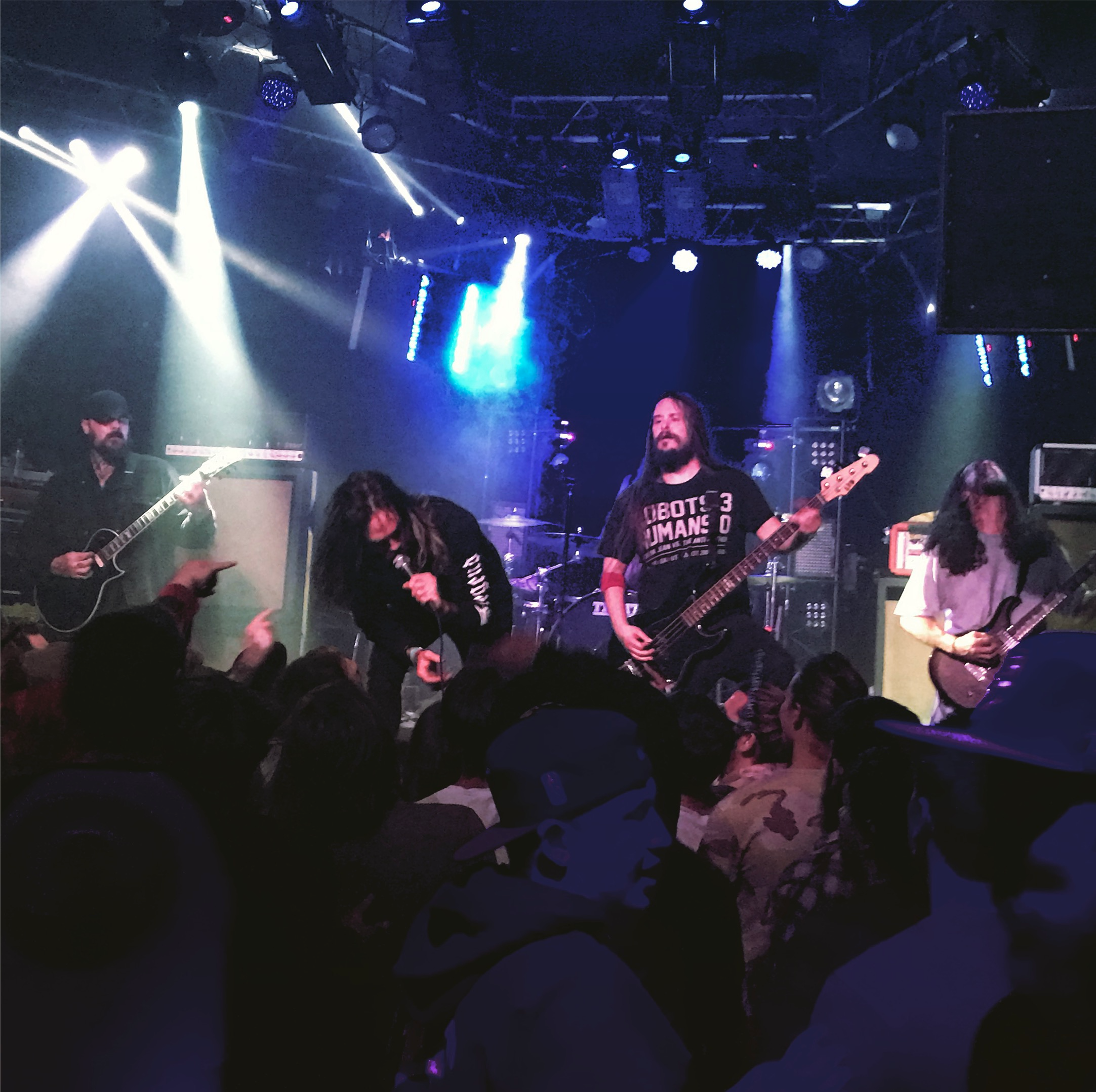
- He Is Legend in 2017

Background information
- Origin: Wilmington, North Carolina, U.S.
- Genres: Hard rock; alternative metal; sludge metal; stoner rock; post-hardcore; metalcore (early); emo (early)
- Years active: 2003–2009, 2010–present
- Labels: Spinefarm; Tribunal; LAB; Solid State; Future Tense!; Century Media; Tragic Hero; El Shaddai
- Members: Schuylar Croom; Adam Tanbouz; Matty Williams; Jesse Shelley
- Past members: McKenzie Bell; Steve Bache; Sam Huff; Denis Desloge
- Website: heislegendnc.com

He Is Legend is an American rock band from Wilmington, North Carolina. It was founded in 2003 by high school friends. The band's current lineup is frontman Schuylar Croom, guitarist Adam Tanbouz, bassist Matty Williams, and drummer Jesse Shelley.

== History ==
=== Formation and beginnings ===
The band's roots reach back into the late 1990s when Adam Tanbouz, Steven Bache, Matt Williams, and vocalist Schuylar Croom began writing and performing around Wilmington, North Carolina, while still in high school. In 2003, having previously played under the names of Stronghold, No One Wins, and the Uriah Omen, the name He Is Legend was adopted by members Tanbouz, Bache, Bell, Croom, and Williams. The name He Is Legend is an adaptation of the 1954 book I am Legend by Richard Matheson. After releasing their first EP in June 2004 titled 91025, the band signed with Solid State Records and released their first full-length album in November, I Am Hollywood, which was followed by almost two years of extensive touring in the United States and Europe. The band temporarily relocated to California to record their next release. However, the release almost never saw the light of day as the group would almost break up right after they had finished recording. Suck Out the Poison was released on October 3, 2006.

=== Departures of Bell, Marlow, and Weaver ===
Soon after the release of Suck Out the Poison, guitarist McKenzie Bell left the band. He was replaced by guitarist Mitch Marlow (previously of Classic Case). During their tour with Chimaira, DragonForce, and Killswitch Engage in spring of 2007, the first few weeks were played as a four-piece without Marlow. During the Peanut Butt Tour '07, a different second guitarist, Worth Weaver, was seen playing in Marlow's spot. At their show at the School of Rock in New Jersey, Bache stated that Marlow had accidentally booked himself to produce a record for another band back in North Carolina. The dates of recording coincided with much of the tour, so he was not able to tour with the band. Worth stepped in and was, by the account of Bache, excellent in his performances. At their final show before beginning their tour in Australia, Marlow performed with the band, confirming that at the time he was still a member of He Is Legend.

The band's performances throughout the 2009 SXSW festival featured them as a four-piece once again. After a Plano, Texas performance on March 17, Tanbouz stated that Weaver, not performing with the band that evening, was planning on getting married soon and he would be focusing more on his solo musical career with his personal studio and music. Weaver began standing in on the 2007 Peanut Butt Tour with the band.

=== It Hates You (2008–2009) ===
On April 24, 2008, He Is Legend posted four demo songs from their sabbatical, entitled "Decisions Decisions Decisions", "Stranger Danger", "Don't Touch That Dial", and "Everyone I Know Has Fangs" from the upcoming record.

On April 16, 2009, the band confirmed that their newest album, It Hates You was being released through Tragic Hero records on July 21, 2009. (Originally set to be released on June 23). On May 27, 2009, the band posted "The Primarily Blues" and in early July "China White III", and "Future's Bright, Man" on their Myspace.

It Hates You was released on July 21, 2009, and produced by Mitchell Marlow and Allen Jacob at Warrior Sound in Chapel Hill, North Carolina, with additional production by Kit Walters.

=== Hiatus and new projects ===
In September 2009, it was announced that He Is Legend is taking an "indefinite hiatus", although the band itself made no public announcement of their hiatus.

From September 2009 until February 2010, frontman Schuylar Croom filled in on vocals for Dallas Taylor with Maylene and the Sons of Disaster.

=== Reunion ===
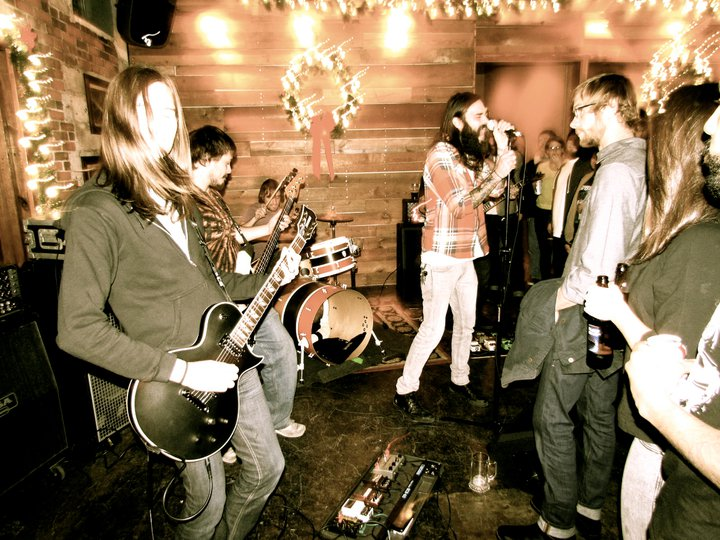
He Is Legend performing in 2010

On December 29, 2010, the band did a reunion show in Wilmington, North Carolina.

On October 16, 2011, it was announced that He Is Legend will be playing their first show since taking an indefinite hiatus in 2009. The show took place on October 31, 2011, at the Satellite Bar and Lounge in Wilmington, North Carolina. On December 22, 2011, frontman Schuylar Croom announced that there would be a new He Is Legend album released in 2012.

In January 2012 the band played two more shows in the North Carolina area, and in March, the band embarked on a three-date tour of the east coast, playing in Baltimore, Maryland, Jermyn, Pennsylvania, and New York City. The band toured once more throughout November–December 2012, but no other news regarding the promised new album were announced.

=== Heavy Fruit (2013–2015) ===
On June 1, 2013, He Is Legend stated on their Facebook page, that Steve Bache had left the band, on good terms, after moving to a new city to pursue a higher education which would allow him a career in life. They compared finding a new drummer to "trying to find a kick ass drumming needle in a hay stack." Luckily, they came upon an acquaintance, Sam Huff, whom had previously played in a band with friends of theirs. He Is Legend stated that "within 15 minutes of rehearsing one of our newer ideas with Sam we realized that he was the perfect person for the position."

On July 14, 2013, the band announced six new tour dates, and stated it will be the band's last tour before entering the studio to record their fourth album.

On August 27, 2013, it was announced that He Is Legend had officially begun working on their fourth studio album, with producer Mitch Marlow (Filter, A Skylit Drive), who was also the band's former rhythm guitarist. In September, the band announced a full US tour for October–November 2013, while taking a break from recording the album.

On January 29, 2014, the band announced new material via Twitter with the following statement, "Dudes and dude babes, we will be premiering our first song from our new album on Friday. Spread the word." The band's new single, "Something Witchy", premiered on February 2, 2014, on YouTube.

On February 19, 2014, the band announced on their official Facebook page that they had finished recording their new album. Though no release date was announced, it will be released through Tragic Hero Records.

On June 10, 2014, the band announced on their official Facebook page that they will be touring North America with Maylene and the Sons of Disaster and Wilson. The band also announced August 23, 2014 as the release party for their new album at Ziggy's By The Sea in Wilmington, NC.

On June 17, 2014, He Is Legend announced on their official Facebook page that their new album, entitled Heavy Fruit, will be released August 19, 2014. They also premiered a new single, "Miserable Company".

=== Few (2015–2018) ===
On November 2, 2015, He Is Legend announced on their official Facebook page that they are launching a crowdfunding campaign to fund their upcoming record. The crowdfunding proved successful, closing on December 2, 2015, having raised 124% of the stated goal, recording of the album would begin soon thereafter.

On March 28, 2017, He Is Legend premiered the music video for "Air Raid" on Loudwire.

The album was mixed by Adam "Nolly" Getgood, who is known for previously being a bass player and co-producer for the American progressive metal band Periphery, who also mixed "Empath" by Devin Townsend, "Shaped by Fire" by As I Lay Dying, and "The Joy of Motion" by Animals as Leaders.

=== White Bat (2019) ===
On October 31, 2018, He Is Legend released the single "White Bat". Schuylar Croom wrote, "We are so stoked to finally be able to let you know we have a new record coming next year. Stay tuned for Preorder info... But for now enjoy the first single and title track White Bat".

On April 25, 2019, the band revealed the track listing for White Bat, along with the second single "Boogiewoman".

White Bat was released on June 28, 2019.

The album received a 9/10 rating from a popular metal music news outlet and editorial Metal Injection, which praised the album: "Simply put, White Bat is the perfect culmination of He Is Legend's career up to this point. Not only is it their catchiest and most cohesive record to date, but it also captures the raw energy of the band better than their past records have.", and highly positive reviews from lesser outlets such as Everything Is Noise and Soundfiction.

=== Endless Hallway (2022) and Croom's health ===
On January 14, 2022, He is Legend announced that they would be dropping out of ShipRocked due to Schuylar Croom having a "serious non-COVID-related health issue". Croom later released via Instagram a video explaining the details surrounding his illness. He confirmed that their upcoming album was completed, outside of vocals. On September 23, 2022, the band released two singles, "The Prowler" and "Lifeless Lemonade", and announced their seventh album, Endless Hallway. The album was released on November 11, 2022, by Spinefarm Records.

== Musical style ==
He Is Legend is described by AllMusic as a post-hardcore band originally known for their "blistering though surprisingly buoyant hybrid of metalcore and screamo before shifting into tones of rugged stoner metal and psych-infused hard rock." They fully left their metalcore influences behind with the 2014 album Heavy Fruit, which added sludge metal and stoner rock on a foundation of hard rock. The band also had elements of emo and southern rock.

== Band members ==
Current

- Schuylar Croom – lead vocals (2003–present)
- Adam Tanbouz – lead guitar (2003–present)
- Matty Williams – bass (2003–present)
- Jesse Shelley – drums (2016–present)

Former

- McKenzie Bell – rhythm guitar, backing vocals (2003–2006; died 2020)
- Steven Bache – drums, percussion (2003–2013)
- Sam Huff – drums, percussion (2013–2016)

Live

- Zachary Nobles – rhythm guitar (2020–present)
- Denis Desloge – rhythm guitar (2014–2017)
- Joshua Snow – rhythm guitar (2013–2014)
- Worth Weaver – rhythm guitar (2007–2009, 2010–2013)
- Mitchell Marlow – rhythm guitar (2006–2007)

Timeline

== Discography ==
Studio albums

- 2004: I Am Hollywood
- 2006: Suck Out the Poison (U.S. No. 158)
- 2009: It Hates You (U.S. No. 126)
- 2014: Heavy Fruit (U.S. No. 148)
- 2017: few (U.S. No. 170)
- 2019: White Bat
- 2022: Endless Hallway

Extended plays

- 2004: 91025
- 2006: Black Unicorn Split

Compilations

- 2006: The Song Lives On: A Tribute to Third Eye Blind
  - contributed "Wounded" (Third Eye Blind cover)
- 2006: This Is Solid State Vol. 6
  - contributed "Stampede"

Music videos

- 2004: "The Seduction"
- 2006: "Attack of the Dungeon Witch"
- 2017: "Air Raid"
- 2017: "Sand"
- 2018: "White Bat"
- 2019: "Boogie Woman"
- 2023: "Lifeless Lemonade"
- 2023: "Honey from the Hive"
- 2023: "Endlesss Hallway"
