= Forgiven Rival =

Australian post-hardcore band

- Origin: Melbourne, Victoria, Australia
- Genres: Alternative; Post-hardcore; Rock
- Years active: 2005-2011
- Labels: El Shaddai Records; Indianola Records (US)
- Members: Joel Thornton; Simeon Dux; Peter Fabrizio; Andrew Hennesy; Lee Omond
- Past members: Adrian Brown; Tim Nelson
- Website: Forgiven Rival Official Site

Forgiven Rival was an Australian post-hardcore band from Melbourne, Victoria. The band play a blend of post-hardcore and melodic rock.

== History ==
After forming in early 2005, the band proceeded to release their debut two-track self-titled demo later that year, which they recorded with Antiskeptic frontman Andrew Kitchen. Extensive touring throughout Australia in 2006 led to national recognition, which the band followed up with their debut EP The Symphony of Words.

In 2008, Forgiven Rival signed to indie label El Shaddai Records and released their first full-length album This Is a War. This same year Cartel Music took over management duties for the band, and they also received an invitation to play the renowned Canadian Music Week festival in Toronto. After returning to Australia they teamed up with Premier Artists, one of Australia's foremost booking agencies.

In June 2009, Forgiven Rival introduced Andrew Hennesy as their new bassist, thus freeing up frontman Joel Thornton. Following this in September 2009, the band announced the departure of guitarist Adrian Brown, who was heading back to Canada after the bands Canadian tour earlier that year. Forgiven Rival held a national tour for his farewell, playing alongside Haste the Day. Shortly after, Lee Omond joined the band to replace Adrian on guitar.

In November 2009, the band entered Complex Studios with Roman Koester of The Red Shore, to record two new singles for release in the US and Australia in early 2010. Early 2010 saw the band team up with Indianola Records for the US release of This Is a War.

Forgiven Rival have toured alongside Disturbed, Trivium, As I Lay Dying, Underoath, Story of the Year, Escape the Fate, The Audition, Parkway Drive, Silverstein, MxPx, I Killed the Prom Queen, and others.

In September 2011, Forgiven Rival announced they would be calling it a day. They played their final show at the Wheelers Hill Hotel in Melbourne on 30 September.

== Members ==
- Joel Thornton - Lead Vocals
- Lee Omond - Guitar/Vocals
- Peter Fabrizio- Guitar/Vocals
- Simeon Dux - Drums
- Andrew Hennessy - Bass

== Discography ==
- Forgiven Rival (2005)
- The Symphony of Words (2006)
- This Is a War (2008)
