= It Hates You =

Studio album by He Is Legend
- Released: July 13, 2009
- Recorded: Various times throughout 2008
- Studio: Warrior Sound, Chapel Hill, North Carolina
- Genre: Hard rock, stoner rock, alternative rock, psychedelic rock, sludge metal
- Length: 57:13
- Label: Tragic Hero (US); LAB Records (EU); El Shaddai Records (AU)
- Producer: He Is Legend; Mitchell Marlow; Al Jacob

He Is Legend chronology
Suck Out the Poison (2006)	It Hates You (2009)	Heavy Fruit (2014)

It Hates You is the third full-length studio album by American rock band He Is Legend, released July 13, 2009, in Europe and July 21, 2009, in the United States. It is their first album released via Tragic Hero Records.

== Track listing ==
No.	Title	Length
1.	"Dicephalous"	4:04
2.	"Party Time!"	4:12
3.	"Everyone I Know Has Fangs"	3:25
4.	"The Primarily Blues"	3:52
5.	"Cult of She"	3:26
6.	"Stranger Danger"	7:31
7.	"Don't Touch That Dial"	4:14
8.	"Decisions, Decisions, Decisions"	4:50
9.	"Future's Bright, Man"	3:45
10.	"China White III"	5:30
11.	"That's Nasty"	5:34
12.	"Mean Shadows"	6:50
Total length:		57:13

== Miscellaneous ==
- Demos of "Stranger Danger", "Don't Touch That Dial", "Everyone I Know Has Fangs", and "Decisions, Decisions, Decisions" were posted on the band's MySpace on April 24, 2008, as samples of music the band was composing on their sabbatical.
- On July 7, 2009, He Is Legend announced that the album would be released in the UK via LAB Records.
- "China White III" is the sequel to "China White" and "China White II", which appear on the band's albums I Am Hollywood and Suck Out the Poison respectively.
- "The Primarily Blues", "Everyone I Know Has Fangs", "China White III" and "Future's Bright, Man" were made available to listen to prior to the album's release.
- The album's booklet features dedications to deceased relatives of bassist Matty Williams and producer/former guitarist Mitchell Marlow.

== Reception ==
Professional ratings
Review scores
Source	Rating
AllMusic	3.5/5 stars
Blabbermouth.net	7/10
MetalSucks	4/5 stars
Rock Sound	8/10
ThePRP	4.5/5 stars

It Hates You received generally favorable reviews from critics. The album peaked at number 126 on the Billboard 200 and number 4 on the Heatseekers chart.

== Personnel ==
He Is Legend

- Schuylar Croom – vocals
- Adam Tanbouz – guitars
- Matty Williams – bass guitar
- Steve Bache – drums, percussion

Additional musicians

- Bibis Ellison – vocals
- Andrew Anagnost – cello (tracks 6 and 8)

Production

- He Is Legend – producer
- Mitchell Marlow – producer, engineer
- Al Jacob – producer, engineer
- Jamie King – mastering

Illustration and design

- He Is Legend – artwork
