= Few (album) =

few

Studio album by He Is Legend
- Released: April 28, 2017
- Recorded: December 2015 – February 2016
- Studio: Warrior Sound (Chapel Hill, North Carolina)
- Length: 43:48
- Label: Spinefarm
- Producer: He Is Legend, Al Jacob

He Is Legend chronology
Heavy Fruit (2014)	few (2017)	White Bat (2019)

Professional ratings
Review scores
Source	Rating
Metal Hammer	3.5/5 stars
Rock Sound	7/10

few is the fifth full-length studio album by American rock band He Is Legend.

== Production ==
few is the band's first album to be produced via crowdfunding; the Indiegogo campaign ended December 3, 2015, with $71,894 raised against a $56,000 goal.

== Track listing ==
No.	Title	Length
1.	"Air Raid"	3:55
2.	"Sand"	2:35
3.	"Beaufort"	3:39
4.	"Silent Gold"	4:11
5.	"Alley Cat"	3:00
6.	"Jordan"	2:49
7.	"Gold Dust"	3:36
8.	"Call Ins"	3:42
9.	"Eastern Locust"	4:00
10.	"Fritz the Dog"	2:55
11.	"The Vampyre"	3:17
12.	"The Garden"	6:08
Total length:		43:48

== Personnel ==
He Is Legend

- Schuylar Croom – vocals
- Adam Tanbouz – lead guitar
- Matty Williams – bass
- Denis Desloge – guitar
- Sam Huff – drums

Additional musicians

- Bibis Ellison – vocals
- Dustie Waring – guest guitar solo on "The Garden"
- Josh Moore – guest vocals on "The Garden"

Production

- He Is Legend – producer
- Al Jacob – producer, engineer
- Adam "Nolly" Getgood – mixing
- Matt Tuttle – mastering
- Brad Albright – artwork

== Charts ==
Chart (2017)	Peak position
US Billboard 200	170
