= Myself Is Less Than Letting Go =

Myself < Letting Go

Studio album by To Speak of Wolves
- Released: May 18, 2010
- Recorded: @ The Fort Studio, Winter Springs, Florida
- Genre: Metalcore, post-hardcore
- Length: 34:17
- Label: Solid State
- Producer: Brooks Paschal & Tyson Shipman

To Speak of Wolves chronology
Following Voices EP (2009)	Myself < Letting Go (2010)	Find Your Worth, Come Home (2012)

Singles from Myself < Letting Go
- 1. "Darkness Often Yields the Brightest Light" Released: April 20, 2010

Professional ratings
Review scores
Source	Rating
Absolute Punk	78%
Alternative Press	2.5/5 stars
Decoy Music	3.5/4 stars
Indie Vision Music	8/10 stars
The NewReview	4/5 stars

Myself < Letting Go is the debut album by metalcore band To Speak of Wolves. It was released on May 18, 2010, through Solid State Records. The first single released from the album was "Darkness Often Yields the Brightest Light".

== Track listing ==
No.	Title	Length
1.	"Darkness Often Yields the Brightest Light"	3:37
2.	"You Should've Locked Your Doors Days Ago"	3:25
3.	"Trust But Verify"	3:10
4.	"Dimming the Light"	3:08
5.	"White Dress, Red Letter"	3:13
6.	"Just One Last Time"	3:09
7.	"In the Midst of the City"	3:32
8.	"Quercus Alba" (featuring Spencer Chamberlain of Sleepwave and Underoath)	3:51
9.	"Your Cage May Not Have Bars, But It's Still A Cage"	3:29
10.	"Nothing Ever Ends"	3:43
Total length:		34:17

== Personnel ==
To Speak Of Wolves

- Rick Jacobs - Vocals
- Corey Doran - Rhythm Guitar
- Aaron Kisling - Lead Guitar
- Will McCutcheon - Bass
- Phil Chamberlain - Drums
- additional music written by Aaron Shelton and Chris Shelton

Production

- Produced & engineered by Brooks Paschal & Tyson Shipman
- Mixed by Jason Suecof & Ronn Miller
- Mastered by Troy Glessner
- A&R by Brian Kroll
- Art direction by TSOW
