= Secret and Whisper =

Canadian post-hardcore band

Secret & Whisper
- Origin: Kelowna, British Columbia, Canada
- Genres: Post-hardcore, alternative rock
- Years active: 2007–2011, 2022–present
- Labels: Tooth and Nail Records
- Members: Charles Furney; Jason Ciolli; Ryan Loerke; Jordan Chase; David Ecker
- Past members: Bradyn Byron

Secret and Whisper (often typeset as Secret & Whisper) is a post-hardcore band from Kelowna, British Columbia, Canada. Secret and Whisper formed after the band Stutterfly replaced their departed vocalist and decided on a new name. Their first album, Great White Whale, was released on February 12, 2008. The band's first single was "XOXOXO" followed by "Warrior (Southern Arrowwood)". Their second album, Teenage Fantasy, was released on April 6, 2010.

== History ==
=== Formations and Great White Whale (2007–2010) ===
The band, consisting of five members, was called Stutterfly until a key member, singer Chris Stickney, decided to leave shortly after they were dropped from Maverick Records. Stickney soon moved to a band called Oceans Apart. The rest of the band, Bradyn Byron, Jason Ciolli, Jordan Chase, and Ryan Loerke, approached Charles Furney, a friend and former member of thebleedingalarm, who used to tour with them, to be their new lead singer. The new line-up became Secret and Whisper on February 24, 2007. They decided on a new band name because of the completely different sound that Charles' voice brought to the band.

Secret and Whisper's debut album, Great White Whale, preceded by the lead single and a music video "XOXOXO", was released on February 12, 2008, via Tooth & Nail Records, to positive reviews. To support the album, in 2008–2009 Secret and Whisper toured extensively and shared the stage with such bands as P.O.D., Dance Gavin Dance, Emery, A Static Lullaby, and Maylene and the Sons of Disaster, among others.

On September 15, 2009 in a MySpace blog, Charles announced the official departure of Bradyn Byron. The band has since recruited guitarist David Ecker (ex-Oceans Apart).

=== Teenage Fantasy and hiatus activities (2010–2022) ===
Secret and Whisper's sophomore album, Teenage Fantasy, was released on April 6, 2010 via Tooth & Nail. The album was preceded by a single, "Warrior (Southern Arrowwood)". On February 4, 2011, a B-Side track "Pixie" was released on the band's MySpace page.

On July 12, 2011, the band announced going on an indefinite hiatus via Facebook note citing difficulties balancing band and family. Secret and Whisper members Jordan Chase, Ryan Loerke, and David Ecker formed the band Shreddy Krueger with Chase taking over vocals duty.

In 2017–2018, Secret and Whisper posted a bunch photos on Facebook hinting reunion and some work in studio, but there were no reunion announcement and no news about their activity as a band later on. However, from 2020 to 2023, Secret and Whisper's frontman Charles Furney has been releasing solo singles under the moniker Skateboard Dinosaur. They resulted in an album titled Butterfly Bat (2023). The album was produced and engineered by Secret and Whisper's bassist Jordan Chase, with Chase also providing bass and backing vocals, while fellow S&W member Ryan Loerke recorded drums.

=== Reunion (2022–present) ===
On February 12, 2022, the 14-year anniversary of Great White Whale, Ryan Loerke stated on his Instagram post that Secret and Whisper started practicing together again with intentions to play shows and write new material.

On April 26, 2025, the band announced their first reunion show for Furnace Fest 2025.

== Band members ==
Current

- Charles Furney (aka Charles Finn) – lead vocals (2007–2011, 2022–present)
- Jordan Chase – bass, vocals (2007–2011, 2022–present)
- Jason Ciolli – lead guitar (2007–2011, 2022–present)
- David Ecker – rhythm guitar (2011, 2022–present)
- Ryan Loerke – drums, synths/drum loops (2007–2011, 2022–present)

Former

- Bradyn Byron – rhythm guitar (2007–2009)

== Discography ==
=== Studio albums ===
| Year | Album details | Peak | | Certifications (sales threshold) |
| Year | Album details | US Heat | US Christ | Certifications (sales threshold) |
|---|---|---|---|---|
| 2008 | Great White Whale: Released: February 12, 2008; Label: Tooth and Nail Records; Format: CD, digital download | 25 | 33 | US: 25,000 |
| 2010 | Teenage Fantasy: Released: April 6, 2010; Label: Tooth and Nail Records; Format: CD, digital download | 11 | 18 | US: TBA |

=== Singles ===
- "XOXOXO" (Great White Whale)
- "Vanishings" (Great White Whale)
- "Warrior (Southern Arrowwood)" (Teenage Fantasy)

=== Songs on compilations ===
- Canada Rocks, "XOXOXO" (CMC Distribution, 2008)
- Songs From The Penalty Box, Vol. 6, "XOXOXO" (Tooth & Nail Records, 2009)
