= The Day Hell Broke Loose at Sicard Hollow =

EP by Maylene and the Sons of Disaster
- Released: February 6, 2007
- Genre: Southern metal; Southern rock
- Length: 9:44
- Label: Ferret
- Producer: Jason Elgin

Maylene and the Sons of Disaster chronology
Maylene and the Sons of Disaster (2005)	The Day Hell Broke Loose at Sicard Hollow (2007)	II (2007)

Singles from The Day Hell Broke Loose at Sicard Hollow
- 1. "Is That a Threat, or a Promise?" Released: February 6, 2007

Professional ratings
Review scores
Source	Rating
Jesus Freak Hideout	4.5/5 stars

The Day Hell Broke Loose at Sicard Hollow is a digital EP by Maylene and the Sons of Disaster, being released on Ferret Records. It has three songs, two of which were later featured on their second album, II. Another is a song that did not make the cut for the first album.

== Track listing ==
No.	Title	Length
1.	"Dry the River"	3:44
2.	"Don't Ever Cross a Trowel"	2:58
3.	"Is That a Threat, or a Promise?"	3:02
Total length:		9:44

== Personnel ==
- Dallas Taylor – lead vocals
- Scott Collum – lead guitar
- Josh Williams – rhythm guitar
- Roman Haviland – bass, rhythm guitar
- Lee Turner – drums
