= III (Maylene and the Sons of Disaster album) =

Studio album by Maylene and the Sons of Disaster
- Released: June 23, 2009
- Genre: Heavy metal; Southern rock
- Length: 38:56
- Label: Ferret Music
- Producer: Jason Elgin

Maylene and the Sons of Disaster chronology
II (2007)	III (2009)	IV (2011)

Singles from III
- 1. "Just a Shock" Released: May 8, 2009; 2. "Step Up (I'm On It)" Released: August 11, 2009; 3. "Listen Close" Released: March 29, 2011

Professional ratings
Review scores
Source	Rating
Allmusic	4/5 stars
Alternative Press	1.5/5 stars

III is the third studio album by Maylene and the Sons of Disaster. It was released June 23, 2009, and all pre-orders shipped on June 18, 2009. The first single from the album is Just A Shock, which was uploaded to the band's MySpace as a promo for the album. About a week before the album's release another song was released to the public: Step Up (I'm On It). On June 19 the album was leaked in its entirety onto the internet. The song "Harvest Moon Hanging" is a reference to the Harvest Moon from the Bone series (most notably collection six, Old Man's Cave). The album debuted at number 71 on the Billboard 200 in its first week of release. It was announced that their song "Step Up (I'm on It)" was used as the official theme for the inaugural WWE Bragging Rights Pay-Per-View. In 2010, was released a Deluxe Edition of the album in iTunes, containing two new songs and the music video for "Step Up (I'm on It)". "Step Up (I'm on It)" also was on Season Two: Episode One of the critically acclaimed series "Sons Of Anarchy", when Bobby came back to the clubhouse after his jail time. "Step Up (I'm on It) is also in the video game EA Sports MMA.

== Track listing ==
All lyrics are written by Dallas Taylor; all music is composed by Maylene and the Sons of Disaster.

No.	Title	Length
1.	"Waiting on My Deathbed"	4:03
2.	"Settling Scores by Burning Bridges"	3:52
3.	"Just a Shock"	3:13
4.	"Last Train Coming"	2:31
5.	"Step Up (I'm on It)"	3:28
6.	"Listen Close"	3:40
7.	"The Old Iron Hills"	2:33
8.	"No Good Son"	2:49
9.	"Harvest Moon Hanging"	3:24
10.	"Oh Lonely Grave"	3:24
11.	"The End is Here... The End Is Beautiful"	5:11
Total length:		38:56

Deluxe edition bonus tracks
No.	Title	Length
12.	"Where the Saints Roam"	3:42
13.	"Cheap Thrills Cost the Most"	3:20

== Personnel ==
Maylene and the Sons of Disaster

- Dallas Taylor – lead vocals, banjo, acoustic guitar on "Where the Saints Roam"
- Chad Huff – lead guitar
- Jake Duncan – rhythm guitar, vocals
- Kelly Scott Nunn – rhythm guitar
- Roman Haviland – bass
- Matt Clark – drums, percussion

Additional personnel

- Bethany Borg – violin
- Jacob Bunton – banjo, mandolin, violin, additional vocals
- Tim Carroll – bowed bass
- Billy Grant – harmonica, additional vocals
- Chris Griffin – dobro, lap steel guitar
- Keith Harrison – additional vocals
- Michael Swann – slide guitar
- Barry Waldrep – banjo, lap steel guitar, dobro
- Adam Wright – piano, string arrangements
- Jason Elgin – engineer, production, mixing, percussion, additional vocals
- Roger Lian – mastering
