= Great White Whale =

Studio album by Secret and Whisper
- Released: February 12, 2008
- Recorded: ZMS Studios (Kelowna B.C. Canada); February, 2007
- Genre: Post-hardcore, alternative rock
- Length: 42:07
- Label: Tooth & Nail
- Producer: Travis Saunders; Danny McBride

Secret and Whisper chronology
Great White Whale (2008)	Teenage Fantasy (2010)

Singles from Great White Whale
- 1. "XOXOXO" Released: 2008

Professional ratings
Review scores
Source	Rating
AllMusic	3.5/5 stars
The Album Project	3/5 stars
Jesus Freak Hideout	4/5 stars
Ultimate Guitar	9/10 stars

Great White Whale is the debut album by the Canadian rock band, Secret and Whisper. The album was in the works for about a year and was released on February 12, 2008. A music video was shot in Pittsburgh for the album's first single, "XOXOXO." The album reached number 17 on iTunes's top 100 albums in its first week on sale.

== Track listing ==
All lyrics are written by Charles David Furney; all music is composed by Secret & Whisper

No.	Title	Length
1.	"Blonde Monster"	1:34
2.	"You Are Familiar"	2:59
3.	"Vanishings"	3:57
4.	"XOXOXO"	3:26
5.	"The Actress"	3:20
6.	"Spider Besider"	3:32
7.	"Looming Moon"	4:33
8.	"Attacker"	3:35
9.	"Anchors"	3:31
10.	"Werewolves"	3:32
11.	"Lovers"	3:43
12.	"Great White Whale"	4:32

Japanese bonus tracks
No.	Title	Length
13.	"Anchors (Acoustic)"	3:51
14.	"The Actress (Acoustic)"	2:53

Furney said the band might put both of the Japanese bonus tracks on iTunes if they receive enough public demand.

== Credits ==
- Produced by: Travis Saunders, Danny McBride, Secret & Whisper
- Mixed by: Jeff Schneweis at Old Sailor Studios
- Mastered by: Troy Glessner at Spectre South
- A&R: Jimmy Ryan
- Management: Mark Lafay at Middle Coast Management
- Legal: Shawna Hilleary at The Artist Law Group

All songs written and performed by Secret & Whisper
All lyrics by Charles David Furney
Seesaw Music Playground (SOCAN/ASCAP)

- Art Direction by: Invisible Creature, Inc.
- Illustration & Design by: Ryan Clark for Invisible Creature, Inc.
- Band photograph by: Christina Tomaras
