= El Shaddai Records =

- Founded: 2006
- Founder: Phil Kennedy
- Status: Active
- Country of origin: Australia
- Location: Melbourne, Australia
- Official website: Elshaddairecords.net

El Shaddai Records is an independent record label founded in late 2006 and based in Melbourne, Australia. Shortly after the label began, they announced that they had a signed post-hardcore band House Vs. Hurricane and rock/hardcore band Forgiven Rival, publishing numerous releases for both groups. In late 2009 El Shaddai Records continued on to sign deals with Antiskeptic, and US groups A Plea for Purging, and This Runs Through for the Australian releases of the bands' recordings. 2010 saw the Australian release of He Is Legend's It Hates You and To Speak of Wolves' Following Voices. In 2011 El Shaddai Records released the Blessed By A Broken Heart single Forever off their album Feel The Power which was released on the label 24 January 2012.

== Current artists ==
- Blessed By A Broken Heart
- Antiskeptic
- To Speak of Wolves
- He Is Legend

== Former artists ==
- A Plea for Purging (Disbanded)
- House Vs. Hurricane
- Forgiven Rival
- MxPx
- This Runs Through (Disbanded)

== El Shaddai Records releases ==
Cat. #	Artist	Title	Format
	House Vs. Hurricane	Comforting Our Thoughts in a Continuous Blue (Demo Single) (2007)	Digital Single
ESR001	House Vs. Hurricane	Comforting Our Thoughts in a Continuous Blue (Studio Single) (2008)	Digital Single
ESR002	Forgiven Rival	Life Behind The Lies (Single) (2008)	Digital Single
ESR003/AMP050	Forgiven Rival	This Is a War (2008)	CD/LP
ESR004	Forgiven Rival	The Request (Single) (2008)	Digital Single
ESR005/AMP033	House Vs. Hurricane	Forfeiture (2008)	CD/EP
ESR006	Forgiven Rival	Like the Effects of the Wind (Single) (2008)	CD single
	Forgiven Rival	The Grey (Single) (2009)	Digital Single
ESR008	He Is Legend	It Hates You (2010)	CD/LP
ESR010	To Speak of Wolves	Following Voices (2010)	CD/DVD
ESR012	Forgiven Rival	You Kiss Your Mumma With That Mouth (Single) (2010)	CD/LP
ESR009	Antiskeptic	Goodbye Goodnight (Live Recording) (2011)	CD/DVD
ESR013	Blessed By A Broken Heart	Forever (2011)	Digital Single
ESR014	Blessed By A Broken Heart	Feel The Power (2012)	CD/LP
ESR007	A Plea for Purging	Depravity (2012)	CD/LP
ESR011	This Runs Through	Until Forever Finds Me (2012)	CD/LP
