= Dallas Taylor (singer) =

American singer (born 1980)

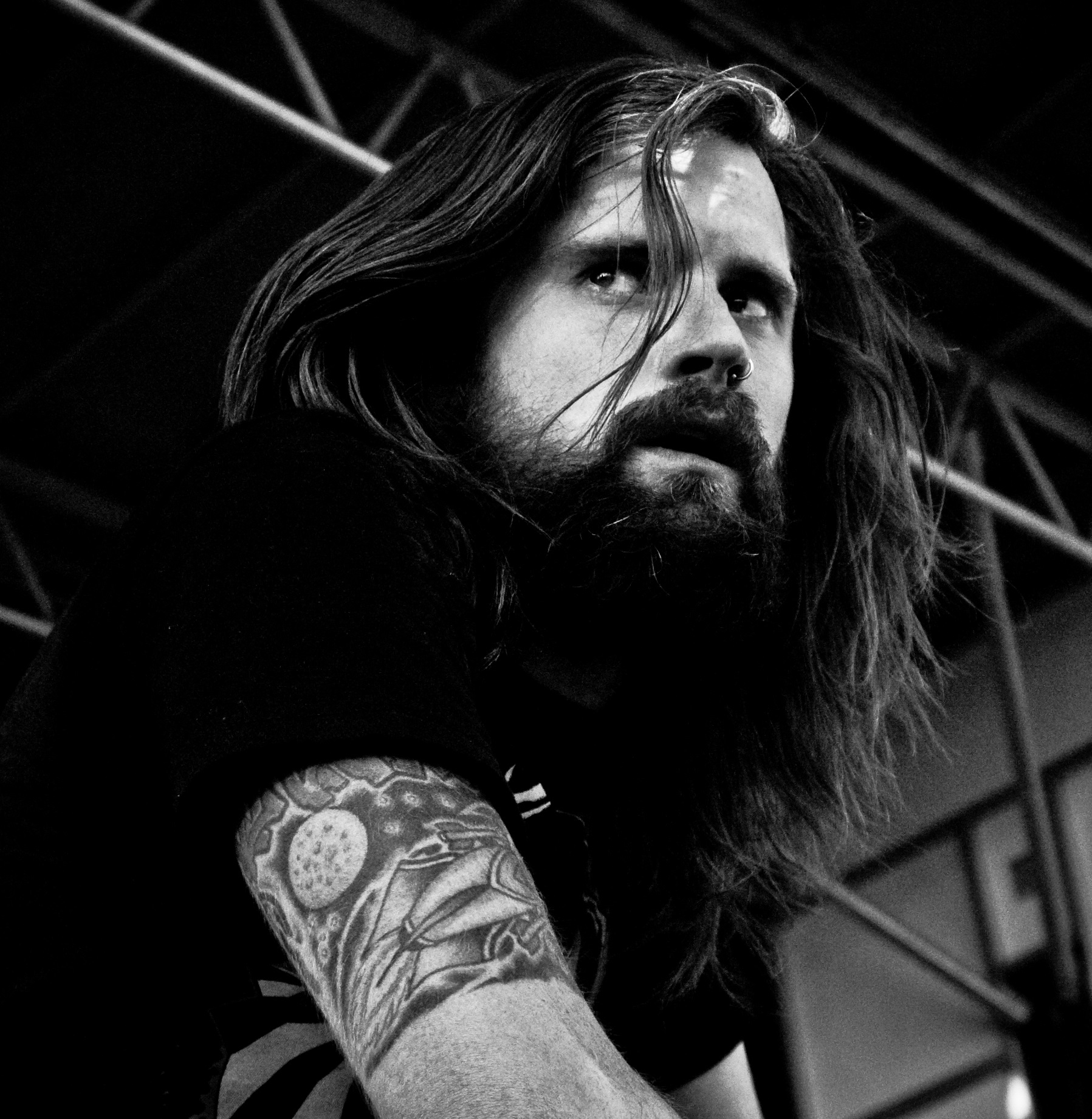
- Taylor in 2008

Background information
- Born: Dallas Taliaferro Taylor; May 17, 1980 (age 46); Ocala, Florida, U.S.
- Genres: Southern rock; southern metal; metalcore; post-hardcore; Christian metal (early)
- Occupations: Musician; actor
- Instruments: Vocals; bass
- Years active: 1997–present
- Member of: Maylene and the Sons of Disaster; Riot Head; Zeal
- Formerly of: Underoath; Everett; The New Tragic

Dallas Taliaferro Taylor (born May 17, 1980) is an American musician and occasional actor. He sings with the rock band Maylene and the Sons of Disaster, which he formed in 2004. He was the original vocalist and a founder of Underoath, performing on the albums Act of Depression, Cries of the Past, and The Changing of Times, before departing the band in 2003.

In 2016, Taylor suffered a severe brain injury stemming from an ATV accident. He has since made a partial recovery and returned to performing.

== Life and career ==
Dallas Taylor was born in Ocala, Florida, in 1980.

He formed the rock band Underoath in 1997 as lead vocalist, along with guitarist Luke Morton, contributing to their first three studio albums: Act of Depression (1999), Cries of the Past (2000), and The Changing of Times (2002). He left in 2003 and went on to form the rock band Maylene and the Sons of Disaster a year later. They released their debut, self-titled album in October 2005, under Mono Vs Stereo.

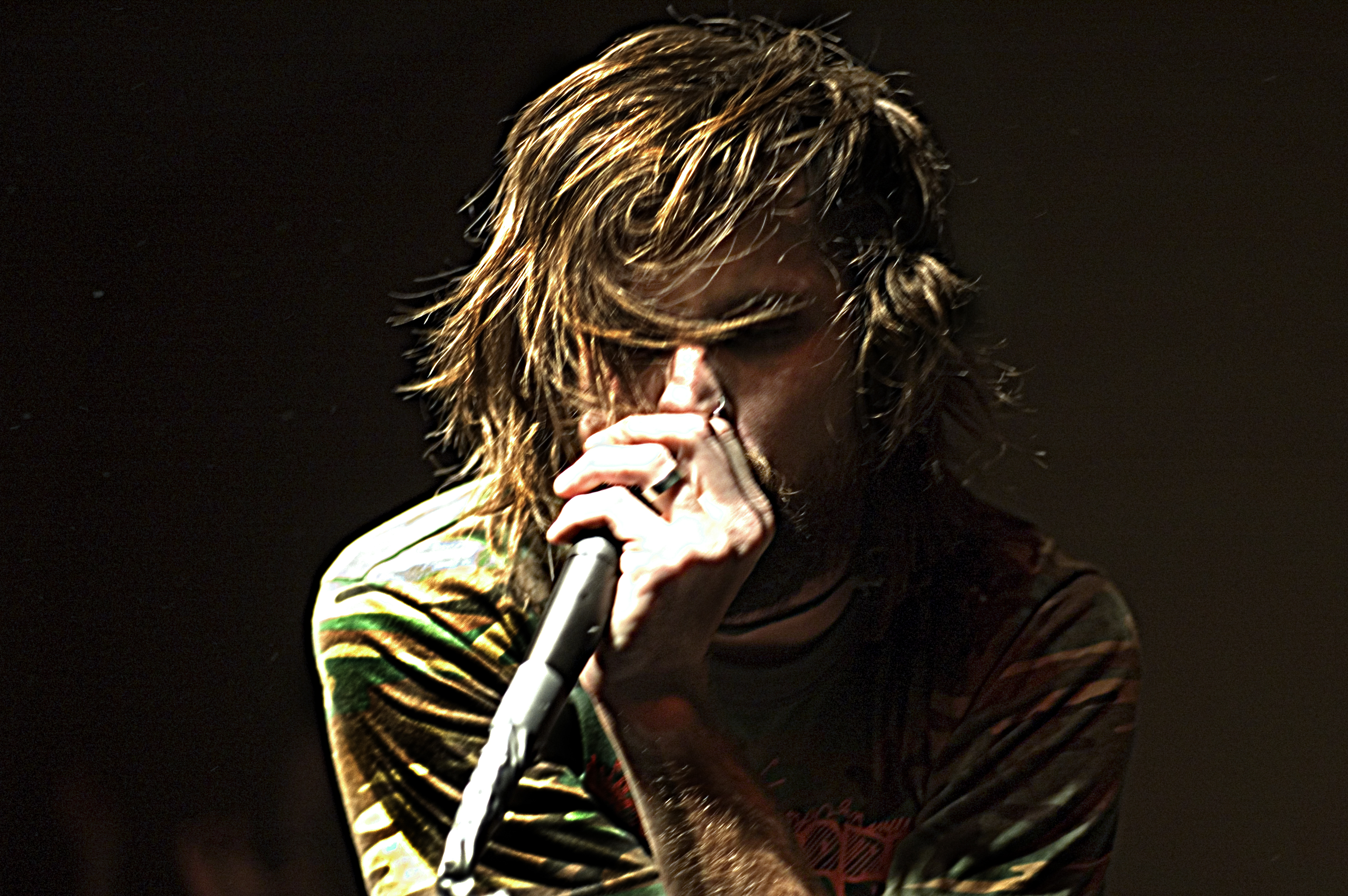
Taylor performing with Maylene and the Sons of Disaster in 2006

Taylor was part of the two-person, piano-based side-project Everett with his longtime friend Patrick Copeland from the Glorious Unseen. In 2013, he started a project with Matt Clark (ex-Underoath, Maylene, Sleeping by the Riverside), Adam Salaga (ex-xDisciplex A.D., Jesus Wept), and Sean Sundy (ex-xDisciplex A.D., Jesus Wept), called Riot Head. Since 2015, he has been playing bass with the Birmingham, Alabama-based punk band ZEAL.

Taylor has also taken on occasional acting roles, including in the 2015 comedy film Joe Dirt 2: Beautiful Loser.

In August 2016, Taylor was hospitalized for a serious ATV accident, in which he suffered a severe brain injury and trauma to the carotid artery. The accident caused him to lose the use of one eye, long-term jaw, dental, and ear canal damage, cognitive challenges, and chronic pain. He has since returned to performing, however.

== Discography ==
=== with Underoath ===
- Act of Depression (1999)
- Cries of the Past (2000)
- The Changing of Times (2002)

=== with Maylene and the Sons of Disaster ===
- Maylene and the Sons of Disaster (2005)
- II (2007)
- The Day Hell Broke Loose at Sicard Hollow (EP, 2007)
- III (2009)
- Where the Saints roam (EP, 2010)
- IV (2011)

== Selected filmography ==
List of film appearances, with year, title, and role shown
Year	Title	Role
2014	The Black Rider: Revelation Road	Rick
2015	Joe Dirt 2: Beautiful Loser	Lucky Louie
2016	The Possession Experiment	Officer Cahill
2018	Union	Thomas Carter
