= Aurora (Antiskeptic album) =

Studio album by Antiskeptic
- Released: 25 August 2003
- Genre: Rock
- Length: 32:11
- Label: 88 Records

Antiskeptic chronology
Memoirs of a Common Man (2002)	Aurora (2003)	Monuments (2006)

Singles from Aurora
- 1. "Nothing to Say"; 2. "Clear to Pass"; 3. "Beautiful in White"; 4. "More Than Kind"

Aurora is the second album by Melbourne-based band Antiskeptic. Prior to the album's recording, bassist Sean Daly departed the band, but returned to play on the band's recording sessions for the album after his replacement also quit. The album marked a slight stylistic change for the group, who developed a more hard-rock and melodic sound, in contrast to the fast-paced and pop-punk sound of its predecessor Memoirs of a Common Man. Lead single "Nothing to Say" featured in rotation on radio stations Triple M and Triple J, while the video was featured on national music video programs. Follow-up single "Clear to Pass" was released as a free, digital only single, and received radioplay on Triple J and FBI. Daly returned to the band in late 2003, and the band released a single and video for "Beautiful in White" and recorded a vinyl single, with new vocals by Daly for "More Than Kind".

== Track listing ==
1. "Dawn"
2. "Clear to Pass"
3. "Nothing to Say"
4. "More Than Kind"
5. "Goodybye, Goodnight"
6. "Road and Travel"
7. "Tried My Wings"
8. "Even/Sacrifice"
9. "Technology Dictates"
10. "Beautiful in White"
11. "Running Now"
12. "Breathe Into"
13. "Dusk"

== Release dates ==
Date	Country	Label
25 August 2003	Australia	88 Records
