= Maylene and the Sons of Disaster =

American rock band

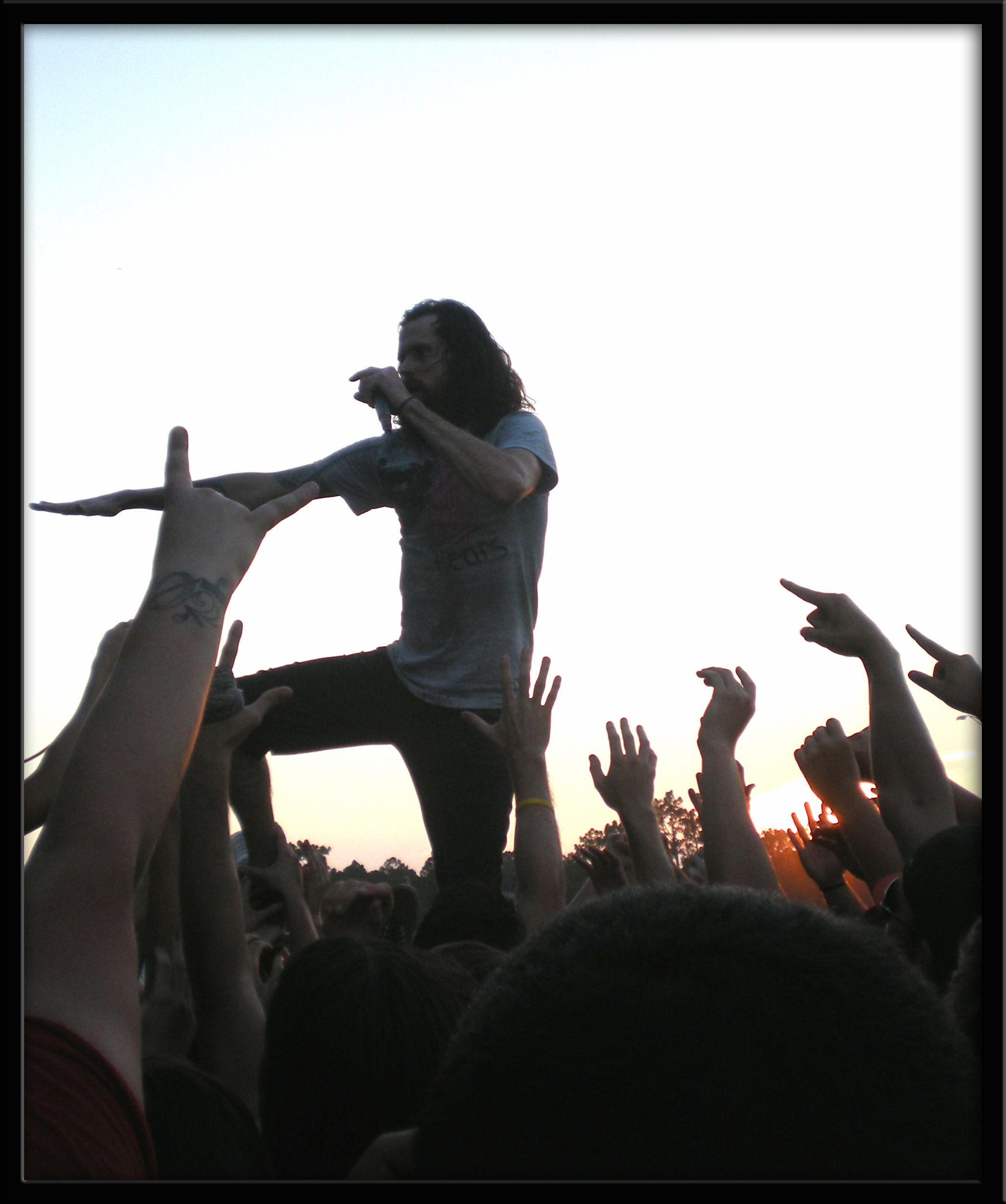
- Dallas Taylor, vocalist for Maylene and the Sons of Disaster

Background information
- Origin: Birmingham, Alabama, U.S.
- Genres: Southern metal; hard rock; southern rock; heavy metal; metalcore (early)
- Years active: 2004–2016; 2022–present
- Labels: Ferret; Mono vs Stereo
- Members: Dallas Taylor; Brad Lehmann; Josh Williams; Josh Cornutt; Jon Longley
- Past members: Lee Turner; Scott Collum; Kelly Scott Nunn; Roman Haviland; Sam Anderson; Matt Clark; Chad Huff; Josh Butler; Steve Savas; Jasin Todd
- Website: https://mayleneandthesonsofdisaster.net/

Maylene and the Sons of Disaster is an American heavy metal band from Birmingham, Alabama. The group was founded in 2004, shortly after vocalist Dallas Taylor's departure from Underoath in 2003. Maylene and the Sons of Disaster signed to Mono Vs Stereo and released their self-titled debut album.

The band name and concept are based on the legend of the criminal gang of Ma Barker and her sons, noting that "evil lifestyles will be met with divine justice".

Loudwire stated that the band's early material was "essential listening for all metalcore fans," comparing them to Underoath.

== History ==
=== Earlier years and II (2004–2009) ===
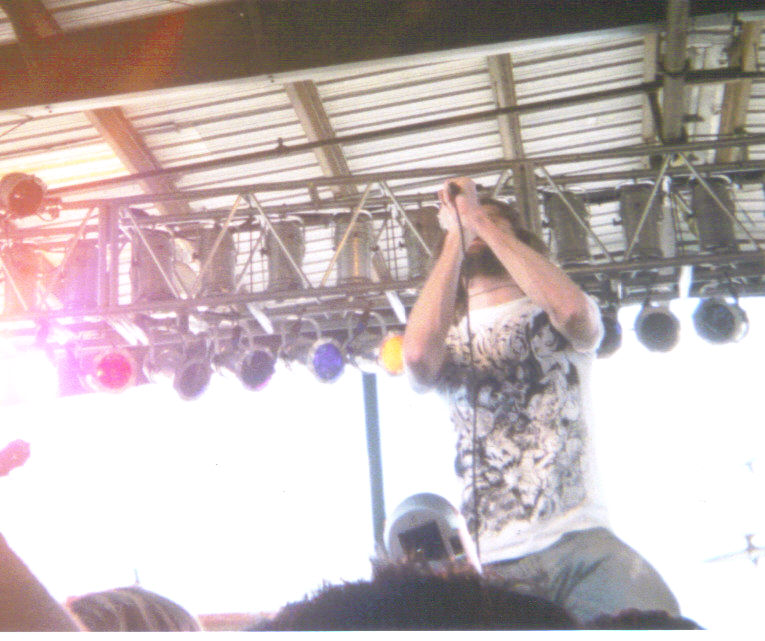
Dallas Taylor

In April 2006, it was announced that the band had signed to Ferret Music. In August of that year, the group hinted they would be working on their Ferret Records debut in October with an expected release date of early 2007. Vocalist Dallas Taylor (formerly of Underoath) updated fans once again in January 2007 and said they would be releasing an EP called The Day Hell Broke Loose at Sicard Hollow, followed by their full-length album, II.

Maylene and the Sons of Disaster's II was released on Ferret Records on March 20, 2007, nationwide. Maylene appeared on the cover of the March/April 2007 issue of HM Magazine.

Throughout April 2007, the band went on tour in support of their new album II with Christian metalcore band Haste the Day. Other bands on tour included From Autumn to Ashes, The Sleeping, and Alesana.

In May, the band was featured on the "Dirty South Tour" with Underoath, Norma Jean, and The Glass Ocean. Notably, this is the first time vocalist Dallas Taylor toured with his old band since he left in 2003. Other bands touring with them with similar southern music styles are He Is Legend and Hey You Party Animals.

In an interview, Dallas Taylor said: "What has always struck me about the Ma Barker story is how much it symbolizes the idea of 'what goes around, comes around.' Divine justice is unavoidable. When I was a kid, I would see re-enactments of the Barker shooting in Ocala every year with my Grandpa, and it was as if Ma Barker and her sons were still screaming their story to anyone who would listen. Maylene and the Sons of Disaster is made up of five dudes who play the role of the Barker sons, and in these songs we speak as though we were them, telling any who would listen that a life lived unjustly will meet divine justice on the other side. We also wanted to think of the most crazy backwoods theme possible for this band. Since Ma was backwoods, and we are backwoods, this is the way it had to be." When asked if they play Christian music, Taylor admits that "For us our faith is what makes us. We believe in showing our fans respect and kindness. I love it when bands minister, as long as their lifestyle off the stage lives up to their life on stage. Nowadays it is kinda cliche in some markets to be a Christian band but being that in itself is hard and sometimes can put a bull's eye on your back. It is not an easy thing sometimes, but no one is perfect. But living to the standards of what you preach and talk about is a big deal and something we chose to do everyday." Taylor has also been quoted as saying that he is tired of bands that try to play off their Christian background or message to sell records or to perpetuate their popularity and stated: "I want every kid to know I am not going to change who I really am to sell records. I mean, I absolutely hate shoving things down people's throats, but hiding who you are is just as bad."

=== III (2009–2011) ===
Roman Haviland

From September to November 2008, they headlined a full U.S. tour with support from A Static Lullaby, Showbread, Confide, and Attack Attack! before beginning to record their third album, III. Half of the members recording this album were in Underoath during their early days.

Their third album, entitled III was released on June 23, 2009. The song "Just a Shock" was released to the band's Myspace page on May 11, 2009. III debuted at No. 71 on the Billboard 200.

From September 2009 to February 2010, Dallas took some time off from touring to deal with some things in his personal life. With the band not wanting to miss any tour dates, they recruited their good friend Schuylar Croom, vocalist for He Is Legend, to fill in for Dallas. During these tours, no original members of the band were present onstage, as Roman had recently left the band and Dallas is the only original member remaining in the band's lineup.

On July 16, the band embarked on the Thee Summer Bailout Tour with Emery, Closure in Moscow, and Kiros on all dates, and Ivoryline and Secret & Whisper on select dates.

They performed the entrance theme for the former Unified WWE Tag Team Champions Chris Jericho and The Big Show, entitled "Crank the Walls Down". Their song "Step Up (I'm On It)" was also the theme for WWE Bragging Rights.

The band was also featured on the Taste of Chaos Tour in Europe at the end of 2009. On Monday, December 7, 2009, while en route to a show in Wiesbaden, Germany for the Taste of Chaos tour, Maylene was involved in an accident resulting in mild damage to the band's tour bus. According to guitarist Kelly Nunn's personal Facebook page, the bus collided with a car, a gas tanker and a guard rail. The band was not injured, but missed their performance time. The band did, however, appear at the merchandise booths later in the day. During the spring of 2010 they were a supporting act with Saosin, and later Story of the Year. That summer, they headlined Scream the Prayer, along with For Today.

=== IV (2011–2014) ===
Maylene released their fourth album on September 27, 2011. The band's first single "In Dead We Dream" was released online before the album release date. Maylene's official Twitter said on March 2 "There is no way to describe this record. Be ready to have your minds open to the best Maylene yet." The album is again on Ferret Records and was produced by Brian Virtue and Rob Graves. Dallas was quoted saying "We are so excited about this new record… it will be by far our best yet. We couldn't ask for a better group of people on board making this record happen."

=== Taylor's ATV accident and recovery, hiatus and reunion (2015–present) ===
In January 2015, Taylor mentioned on an episode of the podcast Killrock that the band would soon be headed to the studio to make their fifth album. On November 29, Taylor posted a photo on his Facebook fanpage showing the band in the studio.

On August 3, 2016, Underoath released a statement saying that Taylor had been hospitalized due to an ATV accident. Rhett Taylor, Dallas's brother, said that Dallas suffered multiple broken bones, internal bleeding, and head injuries.

Early in January 2022, a video leaked of Scott Hansen directing a new music video for the band, which was officially announced as the band's "comeback" single on January 7.

On Sept. 9th 2022 the band released "Burn the Witches". Their first studio release in almost 11 years. The song is a sonic bombardment showcasing the bands technical skill while maintaining the raw chaotic energy that carved out the bands sound.

On May 9th 2024 Maylene release their second single "Thrush" in the middle of their "Cheatin' On Death Tour". This time the band returned to its roots of riff driven swampy metal.

In the winter of 2025 original lineup guitarists Josh Williams and Josh Cornutt officially re-joined the band. The current lineup stated they plan on recording new music and have select tours and festivals booked the rest of the year.

== Members ==
Current members

- Dallas Taylor – lead vocals (2004–2016, 2022–present), acoustic guitar, banjo (2009–2016)
- Brad Lehmann – bass, backing vocals (2009–2016, 2022–present)
- Josh Williams – lead guitar (2005–2008,2024-present)
- Josh Cornutt – lead guitar (2004–2008, 2024-present)
- Jon Thatcher Longley – drums (2015–2016, 2022–present; touring 2011)

Former touring musicians

- Schuylar Croom – lead vocals (2009–2010)
- Sam Anderson – drums, backing vocals (2011, 2014)
- Josh Butler – drums (2011)
- Luis Mariani – rhythm guitar, backing vocals (2011)
- Matthew Hastings – lead vocals (2016)
- Keller Harbin – lead vocals (2016)

Former members

- Steve Savas – lead guitar, backing vocals (2015–2016, 2022–2024)
- Scott Collum – rhythm guitar (2004–2008)
- Matthew Hyatt – rhythm guitar (2007)
- Lee Turner – drums (2004–2008)
- Roman Haviland – bass, backing vocals (2004–2009)
- Jasin Todd – rhythm guitar (2015–2016,2022-2024)
- Kelly Scott Nunn – rhythm guitar, backing vocals (2008–2010)
- Matt Clark – drums, backing vocals (2008–2011)
- Chad Huff – lead guitar (2008–2015), rhythm guitar (2011–2013)
- Jake Duncan – rhythm guitar, backing vocals (2009–2011, 2013–2016)
- Miles McPherson – drums (2011–2014)

Timeline

== Discography ==
=== Studio albums ===
| Released | Title | Label | Chart peaks | | | | |
| Released | Title | Label | US | US Heatseekers | US Indie | US Hard Rock | US Rock |
|---|---|---|---|---|---|---|---|
| October 25, 2005 | Maylene and the Sons of Disaster | Mono vs Stereo | — | — | — | — | — |
| March 20, 2007 | II | Ferret Records | 156 | 3 | 17 | — | — |
| June 23, 2009 | III | Ferret Records | 71 | — | 7 | 9 | 26 |
| September 27, 2011 | IV | Ferret Records | — | — | 38 | 24 | — |

=== EPs ===
| Released | Title | Label |
|---|---|---|
| February 6, 2007 | The Day Hell Broke Loose at Sicard Hollow | Ferret Records |
| July 27, 2010 | Where the Saints Roam | Ferret Records |

=== Singles ===
| Year | Title | Album |
|---|---|---|
| 2005 | "Tough As John Jacobs" | Maylene and the Sons of Disaster |
| 2005 | "Caution: Dangerous Curves Ahead" | Maylene and the Sons of Disaster |
| 2007 | "Is That a Threat, or a Promise?" | The Day Hell Broke Loose at Sicard Hollow |
| 2007 | "Dry the River" | II |
| 2007 | "Memories of the Grove" | II |
| 2007 | "Darkest of Kin" | II |
| 2009 | "Just a Shock" | III |
| 2009 | "Step Up (I'm on It)" | III |
| 2010 | "Where the Saints Roam" / "Cheap Thrills Cost the Most" | Where the Saints Roam |
| 2011 | "Listen Close" | III |
| 2011 | "Open Your Eyes" | IV |
| 2022 | "Burn the Witches" | TBD |
| 2024 | "Thrush" | TBD |

== Videography ==
"Tough As John Jacobs" – Maylene and the Sons of Disaster (2005, Mono Vs Stereo)
"Dry the River" – II (2007, Ferret Records)
"Darkest of Kin" – II (2007, Ferret Records)
"The Day Hell Broke Loose at Sicard Hollow" – II (2007, Ferret Records)
"Raised by the Tide" – II (2009, Ferret Records)
"Step Up (I'm on It)" – III (2009, Ferret Records)
"Listen Close" – III (2011, Ferret Records)
"Open Your Eyes" – IV (2012, Ferret Records)
"Burn The Witches" – TBD (2022, Independent)
"Thrush" – TBD (2024, Independent)
