= Heavy Fruit =

Studio album by He Is Legend
- Released: August 19, 2014
- Recorded: August–September 2013
- Studio: The Fidelitorium (Winston-Salem, North Carolina); Warrior Sound (Chapel Hill, North Carolina); Los Angeles, California
- Genre: Hard rock
- Length: 55:42
- Label: Tragic Hero
- Producer: He Is Legend, Mitchell Marlow, Al Jacob

He Is Legend chronology
It Hates You (2009)	Heavy Fruit (2014)	few (2017)

Professional ratings
Review scores
Source	Rating
Absolutepunk	9/10
Alternative Press	3.5/5 stars
Heavy Blog Is Heavy	4.5/5 stars
Revolver	4.5/5 stars
Theprp	4/5 stars

Heavy Fruit is the fourth full-length studio album by American rock band He Is Legend and their first since coming back from hiatus in 2011. It was released on August 19, 2014, through Tragic Hero Records. It is the band's second album released on that label, after 2009's It Hates You.

== Track listing ==
No.	Title	Length
1.	"No Visitors"	5:21
2.	"This Will Never Work"	3:51
3.	"Miserable Company"	5:36
4.	"Something, Something, Something Witchy"	4:03
5.	"I Sleep Just Fine"	6:15
6.	"Beethozart"	5:26
7.	"Spout Mouth"	3:29
8.	"Be Easy"	4:05
9.	"Time to Stain"	4:00
10.	"ABRACADABRA" (featuring The Brothers Beast)	2:49
11.	"Smoker Scoff"	3:06
12.	"The Carpet"	3:36
13.	"Heavy Fruit"	4:05
Total length:		55:42

== Personnel ==
He Is Legend

- Schuylar Croom – vocals
- Adam Tanbouz – guitars
- Matty Williams – bass
- Sam Huff – drums, percussion

Additional musicians

- Bibis Ellison – vocals

Production

- He Is Legend – producer
- Mitchell Marlow – producer, engineer
- Al Jacob – producer, engineer
- Bob Marlette – mixing
- John Naclerio – mastering

Illustration and design

- Kate Sinclair – artwork
- Carlos Perez & Garrison Lee – design
