= And We Are Bled of Color =

Studio album by Stutterfly
- Released: 2005
- Length: 42:04
- Label: Maverick Records
- Producer: Ulrich Wild

Stutterfly chronology
Broken in Pieces (2002)	And We Are Bled of Color (2005)

Professional ratings
Review scores
Source	Rating
Allmusic	2/5 stars

And We Are Bled of Color was the first full-length album from the band Stutterfly. The single from the album, "Gun in Hand", was featured on the House of Wax soundtrack, and the Warped Tour 2004 Compilation Album.

== Track listing ==
1. "Dead Eyes" - 3:30
2. "Where Angels Fell" - 3:17
3. "Gun in Hand" - 3:29
4. "Fire Whispers" - 2:52
5. "Bury Me (The Scarlet Path)" - 3:04
6. "Silent Scream" - 3:20
7. "Burnt Memories" - 3:23
8. "The Breath" - 3:03
9. "Formula of Flesh" - 4:12
10. "The Sun Bleeds Red" - 2:53
11. "Shallow Reasons" - 3:02
12. "Life's Disease" - 3:24
13. "Flames Adorn the Silence" - 4:35

== Personnel ==
- Chris Stickney - lead vocals
- Bradyn Byron - rhythm guitar, backing vocals
- Jordan Chase - bass guitar, backing vocals
- Jason Ciolli - lead guitar
- Ryan Loerke - drums, percussion
