= To Speak of Wolves =

American metalcore band

- Origin: Greensboro, North Carolina, U.S.
- Genres: Metalcore; post-hardcore; Christian hardcore
- Years active: 2007–present
- Labels: Cardigan; Solid State; Tragic Hero; El Shaddai
- Members: Gage Speas; Seth Webster; Andrew Gaultier; Phil Chamberlain
- Past members: Rick Jacobs; Will McCutcheon; Aaron Shelton; Chris Shelton; Matthew Goldfarb; Corey Doran; Aaron Marsh; Drew Fulk; Aaron Kisling

To Speak of Wolves is an American metalcore band from Greensboro, North Carolina, formed in 2007. The band has released three full-length studio albums, Myself < Letting Go, Find Your Worth, Come Home, and Dead in the Shadow. The band was founded by Phil Chamberlain, the brother of Underoath frontman Spencer Chamberlain, Aaron Shelton and Chris Shelton formerly of the Human Flight Committee, Drew Fulk, and Matthew Goldfarb.

== History ==
To Speak of Wolves was founded in 2007 with ex-members of several touring bands, including Sullivan, This Runs Through and Human Flight Committee. They signed with Tragic Hero Records and released their first EP, Following Voices. Following this, the band went through a number of line-up changes, before settling on the current line-up and signing with Solid State Records.

In 2010, they released their first full-length album, Myself < Letting Go. In late 2010, the lead vocalist, Rick Jacobs, left the band, being replaced by the former Oh, Sleeper merchandise man, Gage Speas. The bass guitarist, Will McCutcheon, left the band and was replaced by Seth Webster.

The band's second album, Find Your Worth, Come Home, was released on May 22, 2012, on Solid State Records. This was the first To Speak of Wolves album with William "Gage" Speas as the lead vocalist.

In 2016, the band announced a comeback and a new EP entitled New Bones that was released September 16, 2016 on Cardigan Records.

== Members ==
Current members

- Phil Chamberlain - drums (2007–present)
- William "Gage" Speas - lead vocals (2011–present)
- Seth Webster - bass (2012–present) (ex-Upon A Burning Body)
- Andrew Gaultier - guitar, backing vocals (2016–present)

Former members

- Rick Jacobs - lead vocals (2009–2011)
- Will McCutcheon - bass, backing vocals (2009-2012)
- Corey Doran - rhythm guitar (2009-2016), lead guitar (2016)
- Aaron Shelton - lead vocals (2008-2009), rhythm guitar, backing vocals (2007-2008)
- Aaron Marsh - lead vocals (2007-2008)
- Chris Shelton - bass (2007-2009)
- Matthew "Goldie" Goldfarb - lead guitar (2007-2009)
- Drew Fulk - rhythm guitar (2007-2009), lead guitar (2007-2008)
- Aaron Kisling - lead guitar (2009-2016)

Timeline

== Discography ==
Studio albums

- Myself < Letting Go (2010, Solid State)
- Find Your Worth, Come Home (2012, Solid State)
- Dead in the Shadow (2017, Solid State)

EPs

- Following Voices (2009, Tragic Hero)
- New Bones (2016, Cardigan)
- Half King (2025, Cardigan)
