= House vs. Hurricane =

Australian post-hardcore band

House Vs. Hurricane
- Origin: Melbourne, Victoria, Australia
- Genres: Post-hardcore, metalcore, electronicore (early)
- Years active: 2006–2013, 2014, 2017
- Labels: El Shadai, Shock, UNFD
- Past members: Ryan McLerie; Chris Shaw; Sam Osborne; Dan Casey; Dylan Stark; Drew Allen; Chris Dicker; Liam Disher; Adam Meyers; Joey Fragione

House Vs. Hurricane were an Australian post-hardcore band from Melbourne, Victoria, Australia, formed in 2006. The band released their debut studio album, Perspectives in March 2010. The band's second studio album, Crooked Teeth was released in July 2012 and peaked at number 20 in the ARIA Charts.

== Biography ==
=== 2006–2009: Early years and Forfeiture ===
The band formed in the suburb of Bayswater in Eastern Melbourne, Victoria and were initially named Beyond Mine, aiming to meld their differing musical influences (post-hardcore acts such as Alexisonfire, Thrice, Saves the Day, Chiodos, alternative rock band Circa Survive, avant-garde such as Björk, and hardcore in the vein of As Cities Burn.

House vs. Hurricane gained national attention when they won the 2008 Battle of the Bands competition which featured 144 bands from all over Australia. They subsequently recorded and released their first extended play (EP) entitled Forfeiture through El Shaddai Records. A music video was made for its title track, directed by Ryan Chamley and shot in the decommissioned Old Geelong Gaol.

House Vs. Hurricane embarked on their first major tour in May 2008 supporting metalcore band The Devil Wears Prada on their Australian tour.

In mid-2008 drummer Liam Disher was kicked out, and bassist Adam Meyers also left after the Severed Ties tour with The Amity Affliction. In February 2009 Drew Allen and Sam Osborne joined the band as the new bassist and drummer, respectively.

House Vs. Hurricane announced via their Myspace page that they were currently writing new material for their upcoming full-length studio album, which was planned to be recorded by the end of 2009 and flew to United States in November 2009 to record their debut album with producer Brian McTernan. They spent six weeks recording at McTernan's Salad Days studio in Baltimore.

Two months after joining House Vs. Hurricane bass player Drew Allen decided to leave the band. He was replaced by Dylan Stark of the band A Fallen Theory. As seen in the "Salad Days Studio Diaries" series (posted on YouTube), the band continuously calls him "Dildo", as well as hazing him frequently. Drummer Sam Osbourne also commented that Stark is very quiet.

=== 2010–2013: Perspectives, Crooked Teeth and break up ===
In January, House Vs. Hurricane signed with Australia's Shock Records and released their debut studio album, Perspectives, on 5 March 2010.

In January 2011, the band posted Joey Fragione had left the band, and in October 2011, Chris Dicker had left the band.

In December 2011, it was announced that Mclerie would become a permanent member of the band Antiskeptic, however, Mclerie would still remain a full member of House Vs. Hurricane. Speaking on his addition to Antiskeptic, vocalist Andrew Kitchen stated that, "we wouldn't even think of asking them (Mclerie and new bassist Tavis Wardlaw) to break off from either of their homes so to speak... I told Ryan that it was much much less of a commitment than House Vs Hurricane. We're not looking at getting back to the days of fifty gigs in a year, we're just looking at bringing it back to maybe ten or fifteen depending on what opportunities come up."

In July 2012, the band's second studio album Crooked Teeth was released. The album peaked at number 20 on the ARIA Charts. At the AIR Awards of 2012, the album was nominated for Best Independent Hard Rock or Punk Album.

On 11 June 2013, House vs. Hurricane announced that they were breaking up, and played their last show on 1 December 2013 in Adelaide.

=== 2014: One off performances ===
On 16 July 2014, it was announced that House vs. Hurricane would be reuniting for a show at the BANG! club in their hometown of Melbourne, taking place on 30 August 2014. This was followed by other events throughout 2014.

=== 2017: Reunion and Filth ===
House vs. Hurricane performed at the Unify Festival in Gippsland in January 2017. It was their first performance in over two years.

On 8 January 2017, the band released "Give It Up", their first new song in almost five years. In June 2017, the band released their third studio album, Filth.

== Band members ==
=== Final Lineup ===
- Christopher Shaw – lead guitar (2006–2013, 2014, 2017)
- Ryan McLerie – clean vocals, rhythm guitar (2006–2013, 2014, 2017)
- Sam Osborne – drums, percussion (2008–2013, 2014, 2017)
- Dan Casey – unclean vocals (2011–2013, 2014, 2017)

=== Past members ===
- Liam Disher – drums (2006–2008)
- Adam Meyers – bass (2006–2008)
- Drew Allen – bass (2008–2009)
- Joey Fragione – keyboards, programming (2006–2011)
- Chris Dicker – lead vocals (2006–2011)
- Dylan Stark – bass (2009–2013)

== Discography ==
=== Studio albums ===
Title	Details	Peak chart positions
Title	Details	AUS
Perspectives	Released: 5 March 2010; Label: Shock Records (CTX551CD); Format: CD, digital download	69
Crooked Teeth	Released: 13 July 2012; Label: We Are Unified (UNFD016); Format: CD, LP, digital download	20
Filth	Released: 2 June 2017; Label: We Are Unified (UNFD090); Format: CD, LP, digital download	99

=== EPs ===
Title	Details
Forfeiture	Released: 2008; Label: El Shaddai Records (ESR005); Format: CD, digital download

== Awards and nominations ==
=== AIR Awards ===
The Australian Independent Record Awards (commonly known as AIR Awards) is an annual awards night to recognise, promote and celebrate the success of Australia's Independent Music sector.

Year	Nominee / work	Award	Result
2012	Crooked Teeth	Best Independent Hard Rock or Punk Album	Nominated

=== ARIA Music Awards ===
The ARIA Music Awards are a set of annual ceremonies presented by Australian Recording Industry Association (ARIA), which recognise excellence, innovation, and achievement across all genres of the music of Australia. They commenced in 1987.

Year	Nominee / work	Award	Result	Ref.
2012	Crooked Teeth	Best Hard Rock or Heavy Metal Album	Nominated	
