= Maylene and the Sons of Disaster (album) =

Studio album by Maylene and the Sons of Disaster
- Released: October 25, 2005
- Genre: Southern metal; metalcore
- Length: 35:30
- Label: Mono vs Stereo
- Producer: Jason Elgin

Maylene and the Sons of Disaster chronology
Maylene and the Sons of Disaster (2005)	The Day Hell Broke Loose at Sicard Hollow (2007)

Singles from Maylene and the Sons of Disaster
- 1. "Tough as John Jacobs" Released: July 19, 2006; 2. "Caution: Dangerous Curves Ahead" Released: December 19, 2006

Professional ratings
Review scores
Source	Rating
Allmusic	3/5 stars
Jesus Freak Hideout	4/5 stars

Maylene & The Sons of Disaster is the debut studio album by Maylene and the Sons of Disaster. The album was released on October 25, 2005 through Mono vs Stereo.

== Background ==
Vocalist Dallas Taylor was originally the vocalist for Underoath, releasing three albums with the band. Prior to recording the band's fourth album, They're Only Chasing Safety, Taylor left the band for various reasons. In early 2004 Taylor sang for the musical group The New Tragic, featuring Phillip Reardon of From First to Last. Taylor formed Maylene and the Sons of Disaster in late–2004 with Scott Collum, Josh Cornutt, Roman Haviland, and Lee Turner. The band signed with Mono vs Stereo and began recording their debut album.

== Track listing ==
All tracks are written by Dallas Taylor and Josh Cornutt.

No.	Title	Length
1.	"Caution: Dangerous Curves Ahead"	3:23
2.	"The Road Home to Panther Creek"	3:23
3.	"Bang! The Witch Is Dead"	3:33
4.	"Tough as John Jacobs"	4:01
5.	"Gusty Like the Wind"	4:00
6.	"The Mind of a Grimes"	2:33
7.	"Lady at the Gate"	3:00
8.	"Never Stop Haunting"	4:22
9.	"Hell on the Rise"	4:03
10.	"Just Wanted to Make Mother Proud"	3:13
Total length:		35:30

== Personnel ==
Maylene and the Sons of Disaster

- Dallas Taylor – lead vocals
- Scott Collum – lead guitar
- Josh Cornutt – rhythm guitar, bass
- Roman Haviland – bass, backing vocals
- Lee Turner – drums, percussion

Additional personnel

- Bradley Lehman – bass
- Brad Blackwell – fiddle
- Jacob Bunton – acoustic guitar, mandolin, additional vocals
- Chris Mosley – additional vocals
- Rodney Reaves – additional vocals
- Jesse Crowe – additional vocals
- Michael Swann – resonator guitar, slide guitar
- Matthew Lorne Clark – guitar, additional vocals
- Eric Chapman – engineer
- Jason Elgin – engineer, mixing, producer
- Roger Lian – mastering
- Brad Moist – A&R
