= II (Maylene and the Sons of Disaster album) =

Studio album by Maylene and the Sons of Disaster
- Released: March 20, 2007
- Genre: Groove metal; Southern rock
- Length: 40:31
- Label: Ferret
- Producer: Jason Elgin

Maylene and the Sons of Disaster chronology
The Day Hell Broke Loose at Sicard Hollow (2007)	II (2007)	III (2009)

Singles from II
- 1. "Dry the River" Released: June 14, 2007; 2. "The Day Hell Broke Loose at Sicard Hollow" Released: October 23, 2008; 3. "Darkest of Kin" Released: November 20, 2008; 4. "Raised by the Tide" Released: April 25, 2009

Professional ratings
Review scores
Source	Rating
Allmusic	3.5/5 stars
Jesus Freak Hideout	4/5 stars
AbsolutePunk.net	(8.9/10)

II is the second studio album by Maylene and the Sons of Disaster. It was released on March 20, 2007, on Ferret Records.

The album sold about 6,000 copies in the United States in its first week, earning them their first placement in the Billboard 200 at #156.

A music video was produced for "Dry the River" and found substantial airplay on MTV2's Headbangers Ball. It has the band performing in the shallow end of a creek and the surrounding forest at night. They are eventually subdued by apparent hunters and dragged through the woods, as depicted on the album cover. Contrary to popular belief, Underoath drummer Aaron Gillespie does not appear in the video. The song "Darkest of Kin" also had a music video.

The song "Memories of the Grove" is featured in the video games Tony Hawk's Proving Ground and a downloadable track on Guitar Hero II

== Track listing ==
All lyrics are written by Dallas Taylor; all music is composed by Maylene and the Sons of Disaster.

No.	Title	Length
1.	"Memories of the Grove"	4:10
2.	"Dry the River"	3:41
3.	"Plenty Strong and Plenty Wrong"	2:41
4.	"Darkest of Kin"	3:14
5.	"Raised by the Tide"	3:44
6.	"Wylie"	3:40
7.	"Death Is an Alcoholic"	3:22
8.	"Everyone Needs a Hasting"	3:22
9.	"Don't Ever Cross a Trowel"	3:03
10.	"Tale of the Runaways"	4:53
11.	"The Day Hell Broke Loose at Sicard Hollow"	4:43
Total length:		40:31

== Personnel ==
Maylene and the Sons of Disaster

- Dallas Taylor – lead vocals
- Scott Collum – lead guitar
- Josh Williams – rhythm guitar
- Roman Haviland – bass, backing vocals
- Lee Turner – drums

Additional personnel

- Jacob Bunton – additional guitar
- Tim Carroll – bowed bass
- Rodney Reaves – acoustic guitar, percussion, additional vocals
- Michael Swann – additional guitar, slide guitar
- Jason Elgin – engineer, mixing, producer, percussion
- Roger Lian – mastering
- Stephen Hutton – management
