= Shreddy Krueger =

Post-hardcore band founded in Canada

- Origin: Kelowna, British Columbia, Canada
- Genres: Post-hardcore; Alternative Rock; Experimental
- Years active: 2011–present
- Label: InVogue
- Members: Jordan Chase; David Ecker; Ryan Loerke; Jeffery David Bryan
- Past members: Tristan Rattink
- Website: Official Facebook page

Shreddy Krueger is a post-hardcore band formed in Kelowna, British Columbia in 2011.

The band released an EP Curses in 2012 and two albums, The Grieving in 2013, and Deeper Darker in 2015 through inVogue Records.

== History ==
=== Formation and Curses EP (2011–2012) ===
Shreddy Krueger was formed in 2011 by Jordan Chase, David Ecker, Ryan Loerke – three members of Secret and Whisper (which by that time went on hiatus) and a friend of theirs, Tristan Rattink.

In August 2011, the band released a demo sampler and full demo versions of songs "Solace", "The Lion and the Pariah", and "The Prophetess" through their SoundCloud page.

The first single titled "Curses" was released through band's official Facebook page on April 13, 2012.

On April 20, 2012, the band released a re-recorded version of "The Prophetess". On May 4, 2012, a new song "Marker" was uploaded to the band's Facebook page.

In July 2012, the band signed to inVogue Records and released a six-track EP titled Curses on August 21, 2012. It contained the title track, three re-recorded demo songs and two more songs ("Vices" and "Marker"). Alternative Press gave the EP 3 out of 5. RockFreaks.net gave it 8/10.

=== The Grieving (2013–2014) ===
On February 18, 2013, the band announced that they will be recording their debut full-length album in March at Old Sailor Studios in Chico, California with Jeff Schneeweis (who previously produced Secret and Whisper's Teenage Fantasy). On June 18, 2013, the band stated that the recording process was completed.

On July 10, 2013, Shreddy Krueger revealed the cover art, track listing of the album and the first single off it titled "Violence".

"Violence" was released as a single through iTunes on July 23, 2013. On July 31, 2013, a lyric video for another song off the album, "Rothenberg", was released. On August 12, 2013, Alternative Press premiered the third song off the album titled "Inamorata".

The Grieving, produced by Schneeweis (Anberlin, Hawthorne Heights) and mastered by Joey Sturgis (Asking Alexandria, The Devil Wears Prada, We Came as Romans, blessthefall) was released on September 3, 2013.

On December 22, 2013, a music video for "Hazel the Apparition" was released.

=== The Grieving reissue and Deeper Darker (2014–present) ===
In September 2014, the band released two studio covers, "This Could Be Anywhere in the World" (originally performed by Alexisonfire) and "My Hero" (originally performed by Foo Fighters).

On June 16, 2015, the band released the reissue of The Grieving with re-tracked guitars, fully re-mixed and re-mastered via InVogue records.

The second album Deeper Darker was released on October 23, 2015, via InVogue Records.

== Band members ==
Current line-up

- Jordan Chase – vocals (2011–present)
- David Ecker – guitar (2011–present)
- Ryan Loerke – drums (2011–present)
- Jeffery David Bryan – bass (2016–present)

Past members

- Tristan Rattink – bass (2011–2016)

== Discography ==
- 2012: Curses EP
- 2013: The Grieving (reissued in 2015)
- 2015: Deeper Darker
