= Eight Days Away =

Studio album by One Dollar Short
- Released: 13 May 2002
- Genre: Emo; pop punk; punk rock
- Label: Rapido / Festival Mushroom

One Dollar Short chronology
Press and Hold (2001)	Eight Days Away (2002)	Receiving Transmission (2004)

Singles from Eight Days Away
- 1. "Is This the Part?" Released: April 2002; 2. "10 Years" Released: July 2002

Eight Days Away is the debut studio album by Australian punk rock band One Dollar Short. It was released in May 2002 and peaked at number 7 on the ARIA Charts.

== Reception ==
Steve from Punk News gave the album 4 out of 5 saying "Eight Days Away is an album loaded with catchy pop punk with an emo edge but it's not quite emo-punk... The second track 'Is This the Part?' has been getting an enormous amount of airplay throughout Australia. This song is pure pop punk, with a backing of vocal harmonies and contains some catchy hooks. The subject matter, as you can guess, is mainly relationships but it is written in a thoughtful and mature way and the best of these songs is 'Satellite'. This is pretty fast, the intro is reminiscent of early Blink 182 and the song contains some delicious melodies." Steve concluded saying "One thing I did find with this album was that I wasn't sure which song I was listening to and the songs seem to suffer from a similar structure but it was an enjoyable disc and I recommend it to those who enjoy pop-punk but with a slight spin on it."

== Track listing ==
1. "Shots Were Fired (Bloodstains)"
2. "Is This the Part?"
3. "The Letter"
4. "Unsung Hero"
5. "Silence"
6. "Ten Years"
7. "Another Day Away"
8. "Satellite"
9. "Colour Red"
10. "Boardgame"
11. "A Theme for New Years..."
12. "Silver Spoons" (Japanese bonus track)
13. "Not Pretty Enough" (Japanese bonus track)

Deluxe Edition

1. Video 1 - Mixing in Studio
2. Video 2 - Producer Interview
3. Video 3 - Live Concert Footage
4. Video 4 - On the Road/Touring
5. Video 5 - "Is This the Part?"

== Charts ==
Chart (2002)	Peak position
Australian Albums (ARIA)	7

== Release history ==
Region	Date	Format	Edition(s)	Label	Catalogue
Australia	May 2002	CD	Standard	Rapido / Festival Mushroom	335092
Australia	May 2002	CD + CD-ROM	Limited Edition	Rapido / Festival Mushroom	335082
Japan	September 2002	CD	Standard + bonus track	BigMouth JPN	
