= Find Your Worth, Come Home =

Studio album by To Speak of Wolves
- Released: May 22, 2012
- Recorded: Glow In The Dark Studios in Atlanta, GA; Summer 2011 - Early 2012
- Genre: Metalcore, post-hardcore
- Length: 41:54
- Label: Solid State
- Producer: Matt McClellan

To Speak of Wolves chronology
Myself Is Less Than Letting Go (2010)	Find Your Worth, Come Home (2012)

Singles from Find Your Worth, Come Home
- 1. "Je Suis Fini" Released: May 14, 2012

Find Your Worth, Come Home is the second studio album by American metalcore band To Speak of Wolves. It was released on May 22, 2012 through Solid State. Produced by Matt McClellan, the record was recorded at Glow In The Dark Studios in Atlanta, Georgia from 2011−2012. The album is a follow-up to To Speak Of Wolves's 2010 album, Myself Is Less Than Letting Go. The album features a new band lineup with Seth Webster in substitution of Will McCutcheon in 2012 and William "Gage" Speas in substitution of Rick Jacobs. The album also features guest vocals from Levi The Poet as well as Micah Kinard from the band Oh, Sleeper. The official song for promote the album was "Hivemind", the lead single is the song called "Je Suis Fini" premiered on YouTube on May 14, 2012.

== Background ==
According to the drummer player Phil Chamberlain, "Most of the record was written on the piano. Aaron sat at his dad's baby grand and wrote for months. We were lodgers for the entire writing of Find Your Worth. We were listening to a lot of Tom Waits' The Heart of Saturday Night and Bowie's Heroes. It's weird to think about but we only listened to music that sounded nothing like To Speak Of Wolves. We didn't want the record to sound like all the bullshit that we'd been hearing for so long. Find Your Worth, Come Home sees the revitalized lineup reaching into darker, heavier and faster territory. It’s an album of rediscovery, and an album that freshly stamps what TO SPEAK OF WOLVES is about, from the title on down."

The title is about we’ve been doing – finding ourselves as a band, proving what are and doing what we do best,” explains drummer and founding member Phil Chamberlain. “This record is something that we’re incredibly proud of. We’ve gotten a lot of compliments about how intense we are live and I don’t think that came across on the first album. This time around we went into the recording process wanting to make sure to capture that intensity, and I think we did that.

— Phil Chamberlain

We couldn’t be more stoked and proud of what we’ve created with this album, We are excited and can’t wait to share it with everyone!

— Phil Chamberlain

== Track listing ==
All lyrics are written by William "Gage" Speas; all music is composed by To Speak Of Wolves.

No.	Title	Length
1.	"Hivemind"	2:42
2.	"Stand Alone Complex" (featuring Micah Kinard from Oh, Sleeper)	3:33
3.	"Vertigo"	2:59
4.	"Broken Birds"	3:21
5.	"A Simple Thought That Changed Everything"	4:05
6.	"Nostalgia Seeds"	4:02
7.	"Je Suis Fini"	3:23
8.	"Oregon"	3:29
9.	"Dialysis Dreams"	4:05
10.	"Voidwaker"	3:35
11.	"Rearview Memories" (featuring Levi the Poet and Bree Macallister)	6:42
Total length:		41:54

Samples

- "Review Memories" contains samples from "Sweet Dreams (Are Made of This)" from Marilyn Manson.

== Personnel ==
To Speak Of Wolves

- Phillip Chamberlain - drums
- Corey Doran - rhythm guitar
- Aaron Kisling - lead guitar
- William "Gage" Speas - vocals
- Seth Webster - bass

Production

- Produced by Matt McClellan
- Engineered by Matt McClellan and Jim Fogarty
- Mixed by Matt McClellan
- Mastered by Troy Glessner
- Management by Scott Lee and Leah Urbano
- Artwork by Ryan Clark
- A&R by Brandon Day
- Addicional vocals by Micah Kinard "Stand Alone Complex"
- Addicional vocals and lyrics by Levi Macallister and Bree Macallister "Review Memories"
