= Press and Hold =

EP by One Dollar Short
- Released: August 2001
- Studio: Powerhouse Studios
- Label: Rapido / Festival Mushroom
- Producer: One Dollar Short

One Dollar Short chronology
Board Game (2001)	Press and Hold (2001)	Eight Days Away (2002)

Press and Hold is the third extended play by Australian punk rock band One Dollar Short. It was released in August 2001 and peaked at number 23 on the ARIA Charts.

== Track listing ==
1. "Satellite" – 3:40
2. "Robot" – 3:23
3. "Fingerprints" – 3:17
4. "Here I Am" – 3:24
5. "Pinball Arcade" – 2:36

== Charts ==
Chart performance for Press and Hold
Chart (2001–2002)	Peak position
Australia (ARIA)	23

== Release history ==
Release history and formats for Press and Hold
Region	Date	Format	Label	Catalogue
Australia / New Zealand	August 2001	CD; DD	Rapido / Festival Mushroom	020482
