= IV (Maylene and the Sons of Disaster album) =

Studio album by Maylene and the Sons of Disaster
- Released: September 27, 2011
- Genre: Alternative metal; hard rock; Southern rock
- Length: 41:38
- Label: Ferret
- Producer: Brian Virtue; Rob Graves

Maylene and the Sons of Disaster chronology
III (2009)	IV (2011)

Singles from IV
- 1. "Open Your Eyes" Released: August 22, 2011

IV is the fourth studio album by Maylene and the Sons of Disaster. It was released September 27, 2011. The first single released from the album was 'In Dead We Dream', through the Revolver Magazine website, on August 4, 2011. On August 15, 2011, Alternative Press released a new single by Maylene and the Sons of Disaster entitled 'Open Your Eyes' through their website. Sept. 26, 2011, AOL began streaming the album via their website.

Professional ratings
Review scores
Source	Rating
Allmusic	3.5/5 stars
Alternative Press	(0.75/5)
Christian Music Zine	(4/5)
Decoy Music	4.5/5 stars
Exclaim!	(negative)
Jesus Freak Hideout	3/5 stars
PopMatters	6/10 stars
Rockfreaks.net	(7/10)
Tucson Weekly	(positive)
Under The Gun Review	9/10

== Track listing ==
1. "In Dead We Dream" – 3:16
2. "Save Me" – 4:00
3. "Faith Healer (Bring Me Down)" – 3:37
4. "Open Your Eyes" – 3:15
5. "Killing Me Slow" – 4:04
6. "Taking On Water" – 4:05
7. "Fate Games" – 2:16
8. "Come For You" – 3:59
9. "Never Enough" – 2:51
10. "Cat's Walk" – 2:37
11. "Drought of '85" – 4:11
12. "Off To The Laughing Place" – 3:27

== Deluxe and 'limited' editions ==
Deluxe Editions of IV are available through iTunes and Amazon MP3. The Deluxe Edition includes 1 new song and 1 remix:

13. "Carry Us Away" - 2:46
14. "Save Me (High Top Kicks Remix)" - 5:47

The "Limited" Edition is a signed copy of the non-Deluxe album. This was only available to the first 500 pre-orders through MerchNOW.

== Personnel ==
Maylene & The Sons of Disaster

- Dallas Taylor - vocals, acoustic guitar on "Off to the Laughing Place"
- Chad Huff - lead guitar
- Jake Duncan - rhythm guitar, vocals
- Brad Lehmann - bass
- Miles McPherson - drums, percussion

Production

- Brian Virtue - Producer
- Rob Graves - Co-Producer
- Forefathers Group - Artwork
