= One Dollar Short =

Australian musical group

- Origin: Central Coast, NSW, Australia
- Genres: Punk rock Pop punk Alternative rock
- Years active: 1998–2005, 2011
- Labels: Mushroom Distribution Services, Rapido
- Spinoffs: Through Being Cool
- Past members: Scotte Woods; Trent Crawford; Adam Check; Michael Smith; Daniel Daly; Michael Kemp; Tim Flaherty; Luke "Harry" Sainsbury; Mikey Sammut; Max Biaggi; Gary Oyster
- Website: https://www.trentcrawfordmusic.com/onedollarshort

One Dollar Short were an Australian punk rock band formed in 1998 in Terrigal, New South Wales. They are best known for their debut studio album Eight Days Away, which peaked at number 7 on the ARIA charts in 2002.

== History ==
One Dollar Short were formed by Michael Smith (drums), Trent Crawford (guitar), Tim Flaherty (guitar and backing vocals), Adam Check (bass) and Scott E. Woods (vocals) in 1998. In 1999, they released their debut EP From the Start on Mushroom Distribution Services.

In March 2001, the band released the EP Board Game, which peaked at number 37 on the ARIA Chart. This was followed by the EP Press and Hold in August 2001, which peaked at number 23 on the ARIA Chart. Flaherty then left to form another Central Coast-based pop-punk band, Best Kept Secret. He was replaced on guitar briefly by Michael Kemp, who departed the band in mid-2001.

In April 2002, the band released "Is This the Part?", the lead single from their debut album Eight Days Away which was released in May 2002. "10 Years" was released in July 2002 as the album's second single. All three released made the ARIA top 100.

In June 2003, the band released "Keep Sake", which peaked at number 52 on the ARIA Chart.

In July 2004, the band released their second studio album, Receiving Transmission, was released along with single, "Some Assembly Required" In early 2005, the band went on hiatus.

In 2011, the band reunited to play their first show in six years at Gosford's Coaster Festival on 17 September.

== Discography ==
=== Studio albums ===
List of albums, with selected chart positions
Title	Album details	Peak chart positions
Title	Album details	AUS
Eight Days Away	Released: 13 May 2002; Label: Rapido (335082); Format: CD, DD	7
Receiving Transmission	Released: 12 July 2004; Label: Rapido (338082); Format: CD, DD	55

=== Compilation albums ===
List of compilation, with selected details
Title	Album details
Unforgotten Songs	Released: March 2020; Label: People of Punk Rock Records (POPR-G001); Format: DD, streaming

=== Extended plays ===
List of extended plays, with selected chart positions
Title	EP details	Peak chart positions
Title	EP details	AUS
From the Start	Released: 16 October 1999; Label: Mushroom Distribution Services (ODS 001); Format: CD, DD	—
Board Game	Released: 26 March 2001; Label: Rapido / Festival Mushroom Records (020152); Format: CD, DD	39
Press and Hold	Released: 20 August 2001; Label: Rapido / Festival Mushroom Records (020482); Format: CD, DD	23
"—" denotes a recording that did not chart.

=== Singles ===
List of singles, with selected chart positions
Title	Year	Peak chart positions	Album
Title	Year	AUS	Album
"Is This the Part?"	2002	39	Eight Days Away
"10 Years"	2002	63	Eight Days Away
"Keepsake"	2003	52	Non-album single
"Some Assembly Required"	2004	—	Receiving Transmission
"—" denotes a recording that did not chart.

=== Other appearances ===
List of other appearances
Title	Year	Album
"Murder on the Dancefloor"	2002	Triple M Musical Challenge 3 – Third Time Lucky!
