= Board Game (EP) =

EP by One Dollar Short
- Released: March 2001
- Studio: Powerhouse Studios
- Label: Rapido / Festival Mushroom
- Producer: One Dollar Short

One Dollar Short chronology
From the Start (1999)	Board Game (2001)	Press and Hold (2001)

Board Game is the second extended play by Australian punk rock band One Dollar Short. It was released in March 2001 and peaked at number 39 on the ARIA Charts.

== Track listing ==
1. "Board Game" - 2:43
2. "Starry Night" - 3:03
3. "Perfect Day" - 3:16
4. "Tim's Brother" - 2:26

== Charts ==
Chart (2001)	Peak position
Australia (ARIA)	39

== Release history ==
Region	Date	Format	Label	Catalogue
Australia / New Zealand	March 2001	CD; DD	Rapido / Festival Mushroom	020152
