= Memoirs of a Common Man =

Studio album by Antiskeptic
- Released: 17 June 2002
- Genre: Rock
- Length: 34:36
- Label: Toupee Records

Antiskeptic chronology
Change My Ways (EP) (2001)	Memoirs of a Common Man (2002)	Aurora (2003)

Singles from Memoirs of a Common Man
- 1. "Called"; 2. "Four Seasons"

Memoirs of a Common Man is the debut album by Melbourne-based band Antiskeptic. Proceeded by two EPs, the recording is the band's first full-length album and captured the group's early pop-punk sound. In 2002, lead single Called featured on high rotation on national radio stations Triple J and Triple M, with the track and video clip also featuring on Triple J's famous Hottest 100 compilation (CD and DVD, Volume 10) after being voted number 92 in Triple J's Hottest 100 for 2002. The success of Called took the band to new heights, and saw them performing at the MOne and Homebake festivals in Sydney. Follow-up single Four Seasons received radio play on Triple J, and the video clip received rotation on music video show rage.

== Track listing ==
1. "As Yet Untitled"
2. "FYSC"
3. "60% Intentional"
4. "Change My Ways"
5. "Letting Go"
6. "Tears Simone"
7. "Called"
8. "Teach Him Well"
9. "Four Seasons"
10. "Prove Me Wrong"
11. "Reflections Perceptions"

== Release dates ==
Date	Country	Label
17 June 2002	Australia	Toupee
