= Antiskeptic =

Rock band

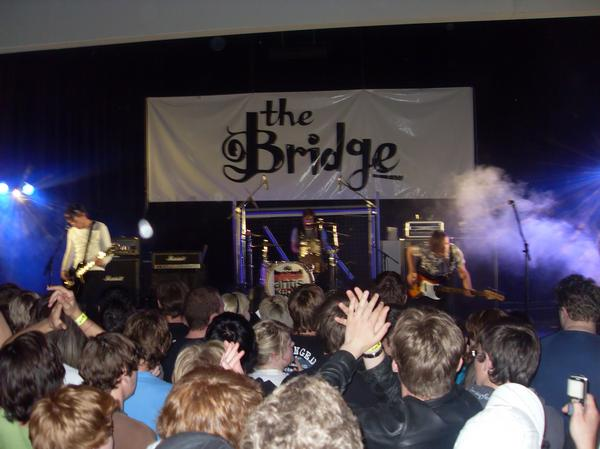
- Antiskeptic performing live in 2008

Background information
- Origin: Melbourne, Victoria, Australia
- Genre: Rock
- Years active: 1999–2008, 2011–present
- Labels: Toupee / 88 (2000–2004); El Shaddai Records (2009–present)
- Members: Andrew Kitchen; Nick Coppin; Sean Daly
- Past members: Shane O'Keeffe; Corey Sleap; Ryan Mclerie; Jarrod Salton; Tavis Wardlaw
- Website: antiskeptic.com.au

Antiskeptic are an Australian rock band based in Melbourne. The band has enjoyed over twenty years of successful touring nationally, releasing four full-length albums, three EPs, one live album and two DVDs. The band have toured with many successful groups, including Midnight Oil, Jimmy Eat World, Anberlin, The Get Up Kids, Unwritten Law, Millencolin, MxPx, Jebediah, Bodyjar and Dashboard Confessional. Antiskeptic are known for their energetic live shows and powerful performances as much as the uplifting and encouraging lyrical content of their songs.

== History ==
=== Early years & Memoirs of a Common Man (1999–2003) ===
Formed in Melbourne in 1999, the band was originally only a side project for guitarist/singer Andrew Kitchen and bassist/singer Sean Daly. At the time, the men were performing in another band named Dispersia which later broke up and gave way to Antiskeptic. Initially named TSP (an acronym for the Side Project), Andrew Kitchen came up with the band's name whilst treating an infected ear piercing; Kitchen misread the label on a bottle of antiseptic and suggested it to the other members. Shortly after, Nick Coppin became the band's drummer and the trio began to write material and play live shows. The band issued a self-titled EP in 2000 and complemented the release with a low-budget video clip for the track 60% Intentional, which was featured on Australian music video program Rage. The success of the EP and 60% Intentional saw the band begin touring outside of Melbourne for the first time, and scored festival slots at the Black Stump Music and Arts Festival in New South Wales and Forest Edge Music Festival in Victoria.

In 2001, the band released a second EP, Change My Ways which featured two forthcoming tracks from the debut album that was still being recorded by Producer David Carr. The EP also featured three previous unreleased songs and a short video clip of interviews and live performances. In June 2002, Antiskeptic released their debut album. Titled Memoirs of a Common Man, the album propelled the band to new heights. Lead single "Called" featured on high rotation on national radio stations Triple J and Triple M, with the track and video clip also featuring on Triple J's famous Hottest 100 compilation (CD and DVD, Volume 10) after being voted number 92 in Triple J's Hottest 100 for 2002. The success of "Called" also lent itself to more festival dates, including the M-One Rock Festival with Nickelback, Midnight Oil and the Goo Goo Dolls and the Homebake festival with Gerling, Jet, Pnau and others.

=== Aurora (2003–2005) ===
In 2003, Daly made the decision to leave the band and pursue other interests. He toured and recorded with his side project, sunsetsallday and also married his partner. He was replaced by Shane O'Keeffe, who contributed bass on "Nothing to Say", the lead single from the band's second album, Aurora. However, the then 18-year-old decided that the pressures of moving from Queensland to Melbourne were too great, and he made the decision to leave. This left the band without a bass player for the remainder of the Aurora recording sessions and the planned national tour to promote the new album. Daly and album producer David Carr recorded the remaining bass tracks and friend Corey Sleap was able to fill in for the tour while they continued to search for a full-time replacement. Despite the setbacks, lead single "Nothing to Say" featured on Australian radio, the music video also ran on national programs such as Rage and Channel V. As the band went on a national tour to support the album, "Clear to Pass" was issued as a free single available through the band's website, complete with artwork. The single achieved some modest radio play, being picked up by Triple M and Sydney independent station FBI.

At the beginning of 2004, it was announced that Daly had rejoined the band after temporarily filling in for the band in December 2003. On returning the band, Daly described the reunion as follows: "The band was in a position when they were trying out some bass players and they were in a spot with some shows. They contacted me and asked if I’d come back as a fill in, which I was thrilled to do because I’d had a break and was feeling great about it. After one show they said we’ve got these other shows booked, how would you feel about filling in for those. Then those three shows became five and it became a case of why don’t I just stay." The reunited trio released a single and music video for "Beautiful in White" and followed up with re-recorded version of the Aurora track "More Than Kind" on vinyl, complete with new vocals by Daly. While the band had reunited, Coppin moved to Brisbane, but remained a full member of Antiskeptic.

In March and April 2004, Antiskeptic headlined the Renegade Festival which toured Adelaide, Sydney, Brisbane and Melbourne. Others on the bill included I Killed the Prom Queen and After the Fall. The band also played the Gold Coast's Festival of Beers, Push Over Festival in Melbourne and the Cosmonautical Festival in Perth during the same period.

In September 2005, Antiskeptic played at Youth Alive 2005 in the Rod Laver Arena, Melbourne. The concert was filmed, and would later be released on the DVD accompanying Monuments.

=== Monuments and split (2006–2008) ===
Following the release and tours for the last of the Aurora singles, the band re-entered the studio to record the EP/DVD release Monuments. The recording was originally supposed to be an album, but the band became concerned that the new studio sessions were too similar to that of the previous album; "we had predominantly focused ourselves on writing another album...but we found that the more and more we tried, the more and more we came up with, it was just sounding like Aurora part two. So we put ourselves to the task of writing something really different and that takes time," stated Daly. The result was a four-track EP that was cut down from 13 demos which showcased a brand-new musical direction for the band, with the group exploring more hard rock and progressive territory. The band supported Dashboard Confessional on their Australian tour, before conducting their own national tour in support of the release.

The band appeared on Rove Live on 19 September 2006 as the show's house band.

In March 2008 at the Easterfest music festival, the band made a statement during their performance that the band was finishing up as of September 2008. Recalling the decision to call it quits, drummer Coppin elaborated that "when we finished up in 2008, priorities had shifted in the band and we were unable to continue doing it in a way that was respectful to all members."

Their 'Goodbye Goodnight tour' was to be their final tour, with only one Adelaide show, one Sydney show and two Melbourne shows, the last of which was on 20 September 2008 to a sold-out home crowd at the Hi-Fi Bar. In celebration of their career, they recorded one final single entitled "I'll Follow", which was available for free download on their MySpace, and released a DVD called Memoirs of a Common Band, which is essentially an overview of their career. The final live performance was recorded and filmed. The concert audio was made available to the audience immediately after the performance on the band's final CD release titled Goodbye Goodnight – Live at the Hi-Fi. A full-length CD/DVD of the performance with enhanced audio and features was released in 2011 through El Shaddai Records.

=== Reformation and Stare Down the Ocean (2011–2015) ===
In March 2011 it was announced via the band's Facebook page that its members would reunite for a special one-off performance at Melbourne's iconic punk/metal venue The Arthouse to commemorate its closing. Tickets for the show sold out in minutes and the band was joined by fellow Melbourne rock trio Horsell Common. The band played a brand new song titled "The Kids Aren’t Scared" and was also the first time people could purchase the full-length CD/DVD Goodbye Goodnight – Live at the Hi-Fi 2008. Following the show, Kitchen and Coppin decided they wished to continue on following the success of the Arthouse show. Following a series of discussions, Coppin and Kitchen decided to reform the band permanently, without Daly; "We got some feedback that Antiskeptic was the chemistry that we all had, but Nick and I were keen to proceed," recalled Kitchen in a 2012 interview. "We all talked about it. A few days after we made that decision, Nick and I walked in on a new frontier. We had gigs booked, and with only two active members. A day or two later, one Bodyjar show was confirmed and we knew we made the right decision from then on." Coppin also expanded on the reasons for the band's reunion and why they would reunite without Daly in a 2012 interview; "weʼd had discussions about doing Antiskeptic again after The Arthouse show, but it was clear that he (bassist Sean Daly) was not on the same page as Andrew and I. This was the reason why things had finished in the first place, so after having had three years to think about the dissolution of the band – there was no way I was going to allow myself to be put back into that position of limitation and constriction. With all due respect to Sean, I now feel that we can lift off the park brake in the car and move on and dream again."

In early November 2011 the band's complete reunion was formally announced, with the addition of new members Tavis Wardlaw of No Love For Lexi and Ryan Mclerie of House Vs. Hurricane. At this time, Antiskeptic announced a reunion tour of Australia; combining club shows with festivals, including headlining performances at Easterfest in Toowoomba (Queensland) with P.O.D., Rapture Ruckus and Mercyme in April 2012, and Victoria's Forest Edge Music Festival with Ivoryline in March 2012. The remainder of the dates will include shows at traditional live venues in Sydney, Melbourne and Adelaide. The band also played a one-off show with its contemporaries Bodyjar and One Dollar Short on 31 March in Melbourne, to celebrate the limited edition release of Bodyjar's landmark album No Touch Red on vinyl

When queried on the future of the band, Coppin stated in January 2012 that it was open-ended; "the plan for Antiskeptic is to have fun. We are now in a position where we are open to anything. We have four dudes in a band that are passionate about playing music and performing for people and that is feeling really exciting and invigorating. We want to continue to tour, we want to record and we want to have a blast doing it!"

In late March 2012 Kitchen announced via the band's Pozible webpage that the quartet would head into the studio to record an album which would be released in 2013. The band will be tracking the majority of the album in Kitchen's studio and are having it mixed and produced by Forrester Savell (Karnivool, Dead Letter Circus, Cog).

Antiskeptic performed at the Black Stump festival in September/October, and was part of Newcastle's two-day CityFest lineup in November with Evermore, New Empire and Stan Walker.

Antiskeptic announced in February 2013 that Ryan Mclerie had left the band due to commitments to House vs Hurricane. He was replaced by Jarrod Salton of City Escape. The band played with MxPx on the Adelaide leg of their national tour in early March, before making a second appearance in as many years at the Forest Edge Music Festival, also with MxPx. The band began recording the new album in May.

'Stare Down The Ocean', Antiskeptic's third full-length album was released in 2014 and was met with positive critical reviews Australia wide and became the Album of the Week on the national Triple M 'Homegrown' radio program.

In support of the album Antiskeptic undertook an extensive national tour with Queensland rock band Young Lions in support. Throughout 2015 the band hit the road for separate tours with American rock bands Switchfoot, Everclear and Lifehouse before calling it a day at the Lifehouse show at Melbourne's Forum Theatre.

=== Reunion Instincts (2019–current) ===
In May 2019, Antiskeptic performed a one-off show in Melbourne with their original lineup (Andrew, Nick and Sean), supporting Anberlin on their 2019 Australian tour at The Forum. The response was so positive from fans that the band made their return official and followed with a tour supporting The Get Up Kids in October that year. December 2019, Antiskeptic celebrated their 20th anniversary playing to a sold out show at the Evelyn Hotel, Fitzroy and announced further shows in 2020 and that writing had begun on new material.

In March 2020 the band performed alongside fellow rock/punk veterans For Amusement Only, Seraphs Coal and Wishful Thinking for a successful run of shows on the east coast which was cut short due to the COVID-19 pandemic.

In 2022 the band released a 20th Anniversary Remastered Vinyl edition of the 2002 debut album Memoirs of a Common Man and tolerated a hardcore/metal band called Dark Antiskeptic releasing heavy and twisted re-recordings of the bands back catalogue which coincided with the vinyl release.

In November 2022 Antiskeptic made a triumphant return to the stage with fellow Melbourne 3 piece Horsell Common for a sell-out hometown show where the band announced their new album Instincts was in development and performed new material live for the first time in 7 years. The band spent the majority of 2023 producing the album and released the first single and video clip for the track Young Hearts in September 2023.

== Members ==
=== Current ===
- Andrew Ridley Kitchen – vocals and guitar (1999–present)
- Nick Coppin – drums (1999–present)
- Sean Daly – bass guitar and vocals (1999–2003, 2003–2008, 2019-present)

=== Former ===
- Shane O'Keeffe – bass guitar (2003)
- Corey Sleap – bass guitar (2003)
- Ryan Mclerie – guitar and vocals (2011–2012)
- Jarrod Salton – guitar and vocals (2013–2019)
- Tavis Wardlaw – bass guitar and vocals (2011–2019)

== Discography ==
=== Studio albums ===
Year	Title
2002	Memoirs of a Common Man: Released: 2002; Label: Toupee/88 Records; Format: CD
2003	Aurora: Released: 2003; Label: Toupee/88 Records; Format: CD
2014	Stare Down the Ocean: Released: 19 September 2014; Format: CD
2024	Instincts: Released: 16 February 2024; Label: AntiVinylVinylClub; Format: Vinyl/CD/Digital

=== EPs ===
Year	Title
2000	Antiskeptic: Released: 2000; Label: Independent; Format: CD
2001	Change My Ways: Released: 2001; Label: Toupee/88 Records; Format: CD
2006	Monuments: Released: 2006; Label: Communique Records; Format: CD

=== Live albums ===
Year	Title
2005	Live EP: Released: 2005; Label: Independent; Format: CD
2008	Goodbye Goodnight – Live at the Hi-Fi: Released: 2008; Label: Hi-Fi Live/Salt Studios; Format: CD

=== DVDs ===
Late in their career, Antiskeptic released a number of DVDs. The first was packaged with the EP Monuments and contained studio footage, as well as a selection of videos from the band's performance at Rod Laver Arena. Memoirs of a Common Band was released prior to the beginning of the Goodbye, Goodnight tour and features extensive footage of the band throughout their first ten years, including interviews, performance videos, live clips and sundry. Goodbye, Goodnight – Live at the Hi Fi captures the band's 2008 performance in Melbourne, at the time believed to be the band's final show. Unlike earlier releases, this DVD features the entire concert. The special features of Goodbye, Goodnight include Memoirs of a Common Band in its entirety.

Year	Title
2006	Monuments: Released: 2006; Label: Communique; Content: Documentary/Live
2008	Memoirs of a Common Band: Released: 2008; Label: Pezwa Films; Content: Documentary/Live
2011	Goodbye, Goodnight – Live at the Hi-Fi 2008: Released: 2011; Label: Pezwa Films/El Shaddai Records; Content: Live

=== Singles ===
Year	Song	Album
2002	"Called"	Memoirs of a Common Man
2002	"Four Seasons"	Memoirs of a Common Man
2003	"Nothing to Say"	Aurora
2003	"Clear to Pass"	Aurora
2004	"Beautiful in White"	Aurora
2004	"More Than Kind"	Aurora
2008	"i'll Follow"	Goodbye, Goodnight – Live at the Hi-Fi
2014	"Hey Dissident"	Stare Down The Ocean
2014	"When The Night Comes In"	Stare Down The Ocean

=== Video clips ===
A number of video clips have been commissioned for Antiskeptic to promote singles/releases. The following is a list of official promotional videos.

Year	Title	Album	Notes
2000	"60% Intentional"	Antiskeptic (EP)	The '60% Intentional' clip was a school project for a film production student and friend of the band. Shot over two days, one half on the streets of Box Hill in Melbourne and the other half in-studio at Box Hill TAFE. The clip was submitted to the ABC for viewing on RAGE and received several screenings which very fortunately coincided with spotplay on triple J. The band quickly gained attention from indie labels, radio and industry professionals whilst touring on the back of this unplanned national exposure.
2002	"Called"	Memoirs of a Common Man	When Antiskeptic produced the clip for "Called" it was to coincide with generous national airplay which the song had picked up and due to favourable attention from Triple J, was included on the first Triple J Hottest 100 DVD. Filmed in an underground carpark in St Kilda, Melbourne between the hours of 9pm-3am one Friday night the clip was put together on a meager budget of only $3000. It was also available on the CD single "Four Seasons" as a CD-ROM component and on various give away/compilation CDs including Coke's M-One festival sampler.
2002	"Four Seasons"	Memoirs of a Common Man	"Four Seasons" was put together on an even smaller budget and shot in an upstairs graphic design/ photography suite in the Melbourne CBD. It featured images of Australian soldiers from the Vietnam War about whom the song is written. This clip also received a generous amount of screen time with support from 'Fly TV,' a music focused youth program on Saturday mornings on ABC.
2003	"Nothing to Say"	Aurora	Another performance clip set in a warehouse capturing the energy and attitude of the aggressive and anthemic track. This video of the band shows Antiskeptic's second bass player Shane O'Keefe who performed in the band at the time of the single's release. The clip received airplay on both Channel V and ABC programs during the two-month national tour that followed its release.
2004	"Beautiful in White"	Aurora	Written and directed by Andrew Kitchen, this very clever and entertaining clip was shot over several days and locations in Melbourne during the summer of 2005. None of the members actually saw each other on the day of their filming because the camera follows the accidental travels of a soccer ball as it encounters the band members in different places.
2006	"Dancing on the Inside"	Monuments	The clip was filmed over 36 hours of straight shooting, not including the digital post production and special effects. Initial production began at various locations across Brisbane for the story/narrative element while the after dusk/performance filming was done at an unused correctional facility in Wacol, Brisbane. The clip was aired on RAGE, Channel V and received generous attention through the bands MySpace and YouTube sites.
