= Suck Out the Poison =

Studio album by He Is Legend
- Released: October 3, 2006
- Studio: The Omen Room (Garden Grove, California); Sound City (Van Nuys, California)
- Genre: Southern metal; metalcore
- Length: 57:03
- Label: Solid State
- Producer: He Is Legend; Steve Evetts

He Is Legend chronology
I Am Hollywood (2004)	Suck Out the Poison (2006)	It Hates You (2009)

Professional ratings
Review scores
Source	Rating
Blabbermouth.net	8.5/10
HM Magazine	3/5 stars
ThePRP	4/5 stars

Suck Out the Poison is the second studio album by American rock band He Is Legend, released on October 3, 2006, by Solid State Records. It was produced, engineered and mixed by Steve Evetts.

== Track listing ==
No.	Title	Length
1.	"Dixie Wolf (The Seduction Of...)"	3:52
2.	"Attack of the Dungeon Witch"	4:30
3.	"Suck Out the Poison"	3:23
4.	"Mushroom River"	3:59
5.	"Opening"	1:21
6.	"China White II"	3:25
7.	"Serpent Sickness"	5:24
8.	"Electronic Throat"	3:21
9.	"Stampede"	3:27
10.	"The Widow of Magnolia"	5:08
11.	"The Pot Bellied Goddess"	3:40
12.	"Cannonball Hands (The Tomato Parade)"	1:57
13.	"Goldie's Torn Locks"	4:56
14.	"(((louds"	8:40
Total length:		57:03

== Personnel ==
He Is Legend

- Schuylar Croom – vocals
- Adam Tanbouz – lead guitar, piano
- Matty Williams – bass guitar
- Steve Bache – drums, percussion
- McKenzie Bell – rhythm guitar

Additional musicians

- Laura Sweeney – guest vocals on "(((louds"

Production

- He Is Legend – production
- Steve Evetts – production, engineering, mixing
- Alan Douches – mastering

Illustration and design

- Invisible Creature – art direction
- Ryan Clark – design
- Colin Patrick Day – cover photo
