= Teenage Fantasy =

Studio album by Secret and Whisper
- Released: April 6, 2010
- Genre: Post-hardcore, emo, experimental
- Label: Tooth & Nail
- Producer: Jeff Schneeweis

Secret and Whisper chronology
Great White Whale (2008)	Teenage Fantasy (2010)

Singles from Teenage Fantasy
- 1. "Warrior (Southern Arrowwood)" Released: 2010

Professional ratings
Review scores
Source	Rating
Christian Music Zine	(A)
Jesus Freak Hideout	4/5 stars
DecoyMusic	3.5/5 stars
Sputnik Music	4/5 stars
AbsolutePunk	(78%)

Teenage Fantasy is an album by Canadian rock band, Secret and Whisper. A rumor was spread across the internet that the album was going to hit stores on October 20, 2009. The band confirmed this information false. Originally scheduled for a February 9, 2010 release, the album was pushed back to April 6, 2010, supposedly so the band could release a music video for the album's single, "Warrior (Southern Arrowwood)". "Edge of Wilderness" was the second released track from their new album. The track was released online as of March 15, 2010. Edge of Wilderness and Whale Bones have been posted on the Band's Myspace page. On April 1, 2010, the entire track listing was available for listening on the band's PureVolume.

== Track listing ==
All lyrics written by Charles David Furney; all music composed by Secret and Whisper.

1. "Youth Cats" - (3:37)
2. "Warrior (Southern Arrowwood)" - (3:52)
3. "Bedroom Galaxy" - (3:59)
4. "Tiny Sparkle" - (3:05)
5. "Famous for a Century" - (3:33)
6. "Edge of Wilderness" - (3:31)
7. "Pretty Snarl" - (1:06)
8. "Star Blankets" - (3:59)
9. "Blush" - (3:49)
10. "Whale Bones" (featuring Jeff Schneeweis) - (4:09)
11. "Silver Mountain" (featuring Hailee (Coppage) Richards) - (4:21)
12. Untitled Track - (1:41)¹
13. "Upset Seventeen" (Hidden Track) - (4:33)

¹ The untitled track consists of only silence.

== History ==
Initially, many fans were uncertain about the seemingly lewd album title. Lead singer Charles Furney put down any and all accusations in a MySpace blog:

For all of you that have put a pervy twist on the name Teenage Fantasy, all i can say is gross. But what can you expect these days, arent we all kind of idiots?

— Charles Furney, Secret and Whisper, MySpace blog 9/14/09
