= I Am Hollywood =

Studio album by He Is Legend
- Released: November 2, 2004
- Recorded: July 2004
- Studios: Zing Studios, Westfield, Massachusetts
- Genres: Metalcore; screamo; emo; post-hardcore
- Length: 38:50
- Label: Solid State
- Producers: He Is Legend; Adam Dutkiewicz

He Is Legend chronology
91025 (2004)	I Am Hollywood (2004)	Suck Out the Poison (2006)

Professional ratings
Review scores
Source	Rating
AllMusic	3/5 stars
Jesus Freak Hideout	4/5 stars
PunkNews	3.5/5 stars

I Am Hollywood is the first full-length studio album by American rock band He Is Legend. It was released November 2, 2004 on Solid State Records.

The album is a commentary on the darker side of the famous district of Hollywood, California. According to lead vocalist Schuylar Croom, "I Am Hollywood just mainly harps on the creepy side of the city that is acclaimed for making your dreams come true."

== Track listing ==
Act 1
No.	Title	Length
1.	"The Seduction"	3:50
2.	"Eating a Book"	3:49
3.	"The Creature Walks"	3:34

Act 2
No.	Title	Length
4.	"The Greatest Actor Alive... (Enters Stage Right)"	3:19
5.	"China White"	4:28

Act 3
No.	Title	Length
6.	"...Best in Mexico"	3:20
7.	"The Walls Have Teeth"	3:56

Act 4
No.	Title	Length
8.	"Do You Think I'm Pretty?"	4:15
9.	"Dinner with a Gypsy"	5:38

Finale
No.	Title	Length
10.	"I Am Hollywood"	2:41
Total length:		38:50

== Personnel ==
He Is Legend

- Schuylar Croom – vocals
- Adam Tanbouz – lead guitar
- Matty Williams – bass guitar
- Steve Bache – drums, percussion
- McKenzie Bell – rhythm guitar

Production

- He Is Legend – producer
- Adam Dutkiewicz – producer, engineer, mixing
- Troy Glessner – mastering

Illustration and design

- Ryan Clark – illustration and design
- David Stuart – photography
