= Tooth & Nail Records discography =

This is a comprehensive discography of the record label, Tooth & Nail Records, and its imprints, BEC Recordings, Solid State Records, Gospel Song Records, and Uprok Records. Though noted for its stylistic diversity, the label predominantly focuses on indie rock, emo, ska, and punk; hardcore, metalcore, metal, and other heavier music through its Solid State imprint; and, through the Uprok imprint, hip hop. From 1998-2001, the electronic music label Plastiq Musiq was a subsidiary of Tooth & Nail. Considered a Christian music record label, Tooth & Nail pursued a "fringe crossover" strategy that emphasized a common subgenre or stylistic identity rather than the faith identity of the potential listeners. This enabled it to reach the entire metal music market rather than just Christian audiences. Considered the most successful "Christian-oriented" label, by the late 1990s, the label was releasing about 30 albums a year, nearly monopolizing the Christian alternative market. In the mid-2000s, the label's Christian hardcore was ubiquitous in the United States, appearing on MTV and radio and in stores such as Target. By the year 2000, it had released hundreds of albums for over 100 bands, selling millions of copies, sometimes 10,000 units at a time. By 2014, the label had put out 600 albums by 200 bands. Joel Heng Hartse in Christianity Today argues that it is hard to overstate how important the label's music was to developing an evangelical creative culture. The label in the mid-1990s was distributed through Diamante, then in 1997 signed a distribution deal with EMI with the launch of the BEC imprint. After the resulting break from Diamante, in 1999 the entire label and imprint roster moved over to EMI for distribution. In 2013, the label's founder, Brandon Ebel, sold the entire back catalog to Capitol Christian Music Group.

== 1990s ==
Artist	Album	Release date	Format	Imprint	Editions/notes
Wish for Eden	Pet the Fish	1993-11	Album	T&N	
Various	Noize, Vol. 1	1994	Compilation	T&N	Free with new subscription to "This Prophecy"
Various	The Winter of Our Discontent	1994	Compilation	T&N	
Focused	Bow	1994-02-23	Album	T&N	
Starflyer 59	Starflyer 59 (Silver)	1994-03-03	Album	T&N	Special edition
Upside Down Room	Upside Down Room EP	1994-03-03	EP	T&N	
The Crucified	The Crucified	1994-03-29	Album	T&N	Reissue
Plankeye	Spill	1994-04-15	Album	T&N	
Unashamed	Silence	1994-06-07	Album	T&N	
Sometime Sunday	Stone	1994-05-20	Album	T&N	
Various	Helpless Amongst Friends	1994-06-07	Compilation	T&N	
Chatterbox	Despite	1994-06-23	Album	T&N	
The Blamed	21	1994-07-04	Album	T&N	
Blenderhead	Prime Candidate For Burnout	1994-09-16	Album	T&N	
Driver Eight	Watermelon	1994-10-26	Album	T&N	
Havalina Rail Co.	Havalina Rail Co.	1994-10-26	Album	T&N	
MxPx	Pokinatcha	1994-10-26	Album	T&N	
Joy Electric	Melody	1994-11-18	Album	T&N	
Starflyer 59	She's the Queen	1994-11-04	EP	T&N	
Various	Tooth & Nail Video Compilation, Vol. 1	1995	VHS	T&N	
Various	Tooth & Nail Video Compilation, Vol. 2	1995	VHS	T&N	
The Blamed	Frail	1995-01-25	Album	T&N	
Luxury	Amazing & Thank You	1995-01-27	Album	T&N	
Plankeye	The Spark	1995-03-10	Album	T&N	
Sal Paradise	Furthur	1995-03-24	Album	T&N	
Value Pac	Value Pac	1995-03-24	Album	T&N	
Sometime Sunday	Drain	1995-04-21	Album	T&N	
Various	Tooth & Nail Sampler, Vol. 1	1995-05-29	Compilation	T&N	
Danielson	A Prayer for Every Hour	1995-06-07	Album	T&N	
Don't Know	Coodli P. Ramaswami Memorial Cheesecake	1995-06-07	EP	T&N	
Morella's Forest	Hang Out	1995-06-07	EP	T&N	
Morella's Forest	Super Deluxe	1995-06-07	Album	T&N	
Overcome	Blessed are the Persecuted	1995-06-07	Album	T&N	
Strongarm	Atonement	1995-06-07	Album	T&N	
Various	@rt©ore Volume One	1995-06-07	Compilation	T&N	
Various	Helpless Amongst Friends Vol. 2	1995-06-07	Compilation	T&N	
Blenderhead	Muchacho Vivo	1995-06-23	Album	T&N	
Focused	The Hope That Lies Within	1995-06-23	Album	T&N	
Joe Christmas	North to the Future	1995-06-23	Album	T&N	
Starflyer 59	Starflyer 59 (Gold)	1995-06-27	Album	T&N	
MxPx	Teenage Politics	1995-07-04	Album	T&N	
Puller	Sugarless	1995-07-12	Album	T&N	
Mike Knott	Strip Cycle	1995-07-24	Album	T&N	
MxPx	On the Cover	1995-08-08	EP	T&N	
Joe Christmas	Upstairs Overlooking	1995-08-25	Album	T&N	
Klank	Still Suffering	1995-08-25	Album	T&N	
Starflyer 59	Le Vainqueur	1995-09-13	EP	T&N	Reissued as part of Starflyer 59 (Gold) Extended Edition
Bloodshed	Bloodshed EP	1995-10-06	EP	T&N	
Crux	Failure To Yield	1995-10-06	Album	T&N	
Focal Point	Suffering of the Masses	1995-10-06	Album	T&N	
Joy Electric	5 Stars For Failure	1995-11-??	EP	T&N	
Everdown	Sicken	1995-12-28	Album	T&N	
Plankeye	Commonwealth	1996-04-13	Album	T&N	
The O.C. Supertones	Adventures of the O.C. Supertones	1996-04-24	Album	T&N	
Roadside Monument	Beside This Brief Hexagonal	1996-04-24	Album	T&N	
Joy Electric	We Are the Music Makers	1996-05-??	Album	T&N	
Unashamed	Reflection	1996-05-10	Album	T&N	
Various	Tooth & Nail Sampler, Vol. 2	1996-05-31	Compilation	T&N	
Ninety Pound Wuss	Ninety Pound Wuss	1996-06-07	Album	T&N	
Everdown	Straining	1996-06-07	Album	T&N	
Stavesacre	Friction	1996-06-07	Album	T&N	
Various	@rt©ore Volume Two	1996-06-07	Compilation	T&N	
Various	I'm Your Biggest Fan Vol. 1	1996-06-07	Compilation	T&N	
Luxury	The Latest & The Greatest	1996-06-23	Album	T&N	
Havalina Rail Co.	The Diamond in the Fish	1996-06-07	Album	T&N	
Bloodshed	The Soft Spoken Words of Fallbrook	1996-08-30	EP	T&N	
Ghoti Hook	Sumo Surprise	1996-08-30	Album	T&N	
Various	Tooth & Nail Sampler, Vol. 3	1996-08-30	Compilation	T&N	
MxPx	Move to Bremerton	1996-09-03	EP	T&N	
Velour 100	Fall Sounds	1996-09-16	Album	T&N	
Joy Electric	Old Wives Tales	1996-10-??	EP	T&N	
Morella's Forest	Ultraphonic Hiss	1996-10-08	Album	T&N	
Rob Walker	Strobe	1996-10-12	Album	T&N	
MxPx	Life in General	1996-11-19	Album	T&N	
MxPx	Small Town Minds	1997	EP	T&N	
Various	BEC Recordings Sampler Volume One	1997	Compilation	BEC	
Various	Tooth & Nail Video Compilation, Vol. 3	1997	VHS	T&N	
Klank	Downside	1997-01-21	Maxi-Single	T&N	
Slick Shoes	Slick Shoes EP	1997-01-21	EP	T&N	
Danielson	Tell Another Joke at the Ol' Choppin' Block	1997-01-30	Album	T&N	
Velour 100	Songs From The Rainwater	1997-02-25	EP	T&N	
Starflyer 59	Americana	1997-03-11	Album	T&N	Original, 12"
Roadside Monument/Frodus	Roadside Monument / Frodus	1997-03-16	Split EP	T&N	
Overcome	When Beauty Dies	1997-03-18	Album	SSR	
Strongarm	The Advent of a Miracle	1997-03-25	Album	SSR	Original, Reissue
Zao	The Splinter Shards the Birth of Separation	1997-04-01	Album	SSR	
Pedro the Lion	Whole EP	1997-04-08	EP	T&N	
Upside Down Room	Drag Baby Drag	1997-04-22	Album	T&N	
Delta Haymax	Delta Haymax	1997-06-03	EP	T&N	
Living Sacrifice	Reborn	1997-06-03	Album	SSR	
The O.C. Supertones	Supertones Strike Back	1997-06-03	Album	BEC	
Crux	Cakewalk	1997-06-17	Album	T&N	
Roadside Monument	Eight Hours Away from Being a Man	1997-06-24	Album	T&N	
Slick Shoes	Rusty	1997-06-24	Album	T&N	
Innermeans	Innermeans	1997-07-29	EP	SSR	
Value Pac	Jalapeño	1997-07-29	Album	BEC	
Training for Utopia	The Falling Cycle	1997-07-29	EP	SSR	
Various	Songs From the Penalty Box	1997-08-26	Compilation	T&N	
Velour 100	Of Color Bright	1997-10-07	Album	T&N	
Stavesacre	Absolutes	1997-11-04	Album	T&N	
Fold Zandura	Ultraforever	1997-10-21	Album	BEC	
The Cootees	Let's Play House	1997-10-21	Album	T&N	
Plankeye	The One & Only	1997-10-21	Album	T&N	
Various	Tooth & Nail Rock Sampler Volume 1	1997-10-21	Compilation	T&N	
Ghoti Hook	Banana Man	1997-11-04	Album	T&N	
Warlord	Warlord	1997-11-11	EP	SSR	
Joy Electric	Robot Rock	1997-11-18	Album	BEC	
Ninety Pound Wuss	Where Meager Die of Self Interest	1997-11-25	Album	T&N	
The Huntingtons	High School Rock	1997-12-??	Album	T&N	
Blindside	Blindside	1997-12-23	Album	SSR	Licensed from Day-Glo
Various	Tooth & Nail 4th Anniversary Box Set	1997-12-23	Compilation	T&N	
Various	Dominate '98	1998	VHS	T&N	
Various	The T&N Files: Tooth & Nail Video Compilation Vol. 4	1998	VHS	T&N	
Danielson Famile	Tri-Danielson!!! (Alpha)	1998-01-22	Album	T&N	
Pep Squad	No Doy!	1998-02-24	Album	BEC	
Training for Utopia	Plastic Soul Impalement	1998-03-03	Album	SSR	2 alternative covers
Frodus	Conglomerate International	1998-03-10	Album	T&N	
Bon Voyage	Bon Voyage	1998-03-24	Album	BEC	
The Dingees	Armageddon Massive	1998-03-24	Album	BEC	
Various	This is Solid State Vol. 1	1998-04-06	Compilation	SSR	
Outer Circle	Outer Circle	1998-04-13	Album	T&N	
Zao	Where Blood and Fire Bring Rest	1998-05-19	Album	SSR	
Craig's Brother	Homecoming	1998-05-19	Album	T&N	
Joy Electric	The Land of Misfits	1998-06-??	EP	BEC	
MxPx	Slowly Going the Way of the Buffalo	1998-06-16	Album	T&N	Licensed from A&M
Project 86	Project 86	1998-06-16	Album	BEC	
Various	Tooth & Nail Rock Sampler Volume 2	1998-06-17	Compilation	T&N	
Slick Shoes	Burn Out	1998-07-07	Album	T&N	
Embodyment	Embrace The Eternal	1998-07-14	Album	SSR	
Various	Songs From the Penalty Box Vol. 2	1998-07-28	Compilation	T&N	
Puller	Closer Than You Think	1998-07-30	Album	T&N	
Training for Utopia/Zao	Split EP	1998-08-18	EP	SSR	
Morella's Forest	From Dayton With Love	1998-09-08	Album	T&N	
Roadside Monument	I Am the Day of Current Taste	1998-09-08	Album	T&N	
Ghoti Hook	Songs We Didn't Write	1998-09-09	Album	T&N	
House of Wires	You Are Obsolete	1998-09-09	Album	T&N	
Starflyer 59	The Fashion Focus	1998-10-06	Album	T&N	
Various	Happy Christmas	1998-10-06	Compilation	BEC	
One Eighty	Crackerjack	1998-10-20	Album	BEC	
The O.C. Supertones	The Supertones at the Movies	1998-10-20	DVD	BEC	
MxPx	Let It Happen	1998-11-05	Compilation	T&N	
Royal	My Dear	1998-11-05	Album	T&N	Licensed from Soulscape Records
Selfmindead	Selfmindead	1998-11-17	Album	SSR	
Extol	Burial	1998-12-22	Album	SSR	
Various	Moms Like Us Too	1999-01-01	Compilation	BEC	
Danielson Famile	Tri-Danielson!!!	1999-01-14	Album	T&N	
The Huntingtons	Live: The Good, the Bad and the Ugly	1999-01-14	Live	T&N	
Pep Squad	Yreka Bakery	1999-01-14	Album	BEC, T&N	
The O.C. Supertones	Chase the Sun	1999-02-23	Album	BEC	
Starflyer 59	Fell in Love at 22	1999-02-23	EP	T&N	
Fanmail	Here Comes Fanmail EP	1999-02-25	EP	T&N	
Goodnight Star	Goodnight Star	1999-02-25	Album	T&N	
The Huntingtons	File Under Ramones	1999-02-25	Tribute album	T&N	
Joy Electric	Children of the Lord	1999-03-23	Single	BEC	
The Juliana Theory	Understand This Is a Dream	1999-03-23	Album	T&N	
Joy Electric	CHRISTIANsongs	1999-04-20	Album	BEC	
Spitfire	The Dead Next Door	1999-04-20	Album	SSR	
Stretch Arm Strong	Rituals of Life	1999-04-20	Album	SSR	
Various	Swing Praise	1999-04-20	Compilation	BEC	
Various	Swing Praise, Vol. II	1999-04-20	Compilation	BEC	
The Deluxtone Rockets	The Deluxtone Rockets	1999-04-22	Album	T&N	
Ninety Pound Wuss	Shorthand Operation	1999-04-22	Album	T&N	
P.O.D.	The Warriors EP	1999-05-04	EP	T&N	
MxPx	At the Show	1999-05-06	Live	T&N	
Dogwood	More Than Conquerors	1999-05-18	Album	T&N	
Living Sacrifice	Living Sacrifice	1999-05-27	Album	SSR	Reissue
Plankeye	Relocation	1999-06-08	Album	BEC	
Fanmail	The Latest Craze	1999-06-17	Album	T&N	
The Dingees	Sundown to Midnight	1999-06-29	Album	BEC	
Various	New Musiq Vol. 1	1999-07-??	Compilation	PM	
Twothirtyeight	Matter Has a Breaking Point	1999-07-04	EP	T&N	
Living Sacrifice	Nonexistent	1999-07-13	Album	SSR	Reissue
Warlord	Rock The Foe Hammer	1999-07-13	Album	SSR	
Various	Songs From the Penalty Box Vol. 3	1999-07-20	Compilation	T&N	
Living Sacrifice	Inhabit	1999-07-29	Album	SSR	Reissue
Zao	Liberate Te Ex Inferis	1999-08-10	Album	SSR	
The Huntingtons	Get Lost	1999-08-12	Album	T&N	
Norway	The Essence of Norway	1999-08-29	Album	T&N	
The Undecided	The Undecided	1999-08-30	Album	T&N	
Flight 180	Line Up	1999-09-14	Album	BEC	
For Love Not Lisa	The Lost Elephant	1999-09-16	Compilation	T&N	
Various	Happy Christmas Vol. 2	1999-10-19	Compilation	BEC	
House of Wires	Monogamy	1999-10-21	Album	T&N	
Various	Any Given Day	1999-10-26	Compilation	BEC	
Various	Tooth & Nail Television: Video Compilation Vol. 5	1999-10-26	VHS	T&N	
Extol	Mesmerized	1999-11-02	EP	SSR	
Training for Utopia	Throwing A Wrench into the American Music Machine	1999-11-02	Album	SSR	
Starflyer 59	Everybody Makes Mistakes	1999-11-04	Album	T&N	
Stavesacre	Speakeasy	1999-11-04	Album	T&N	
Hangnail	Hangnail	1999-11-16	Album	BEC	
Sarah Masen	The Holding	1999-11-16	Album	BEC	Reissue
Furthermore	Fluorescent Jellyfish	1999-11-18	Album	T&N	
Lost Dogs	Gift Horse	1999-11-30	Album	BEC	

== 2000s ==
Artist	Album	Release Date	Format	Imprint	Editions/Notes
3rd Root	A Sign of Things to Come	2000	Album	SSR	
3rd Root	Spirit of Life	2000	EP	SSR	
Born Blind	One For All	2000	Album	SSR	
Embodyment	The Narrow Scope of Things	2000	Album	SSR	
Lengsel	Solace	2000	Album	SSR	
Society's Finest	The Journey...So Far	2000	Album	SSR	
Various	Cheapskates: Harder Side	2000	Compilation	T&N	
Various	Cheapskates: Softer Side	2000	Compilation	BEC	
Various	Free·Bee	2000	Compilation	T&N	
Various	Solid State Records: 2001 Tour Sampler	2000	Compilation	SSR	
Various	Tooth and Nail Video Collection, Vol. 6	2000	VHS	T&N	
Selfmindead	At The Barricades We Fall	2000-01-11	Album	SSR	
The Huntingtons	Plastic Surgery	2000-01-20	Album	T&N	
Blindside	A Thought Crushed My Mind	2000-01-25	Album	SSR	
Sup the Chemist	Dust	2000-01-25	Album	UpR	
Ultrabeat	Trip to a Planet Called Heaven	2000-01-25	Album	BEC	
Project 86	Drawing Black Lines	2000-02-15	Album	BEC	
Element 101	Future Plans Undecided	2000-02-17	Album	T&N	
The Deadlines	The Death & Life of...	2000-03-20	Album	T&N	
Off the Record	Remember When...	2000-03-20	Album	T&N	
MG! The Visionary	Transparemcee	2000-03-28	Album	UpRok	
AP2	Suspension of Disbelief	2000-03-30	Album	T&N	
Slick Shoes	Wake Up Screaming	2000-05-11	Album	T&N	
MxPx	The Ever Passing Moment	2000-05-16	Album	T&N	
Shorthanded	Forever Yours	2000-06-08	Album	T&N	
Joy Electric	Unelectric	2000-06-20	Album	BEC	
Extol	Undeceived	2000-06-20	Album	SSR	Licensed from Century Media
Hangnail	Hangnail	2000-06-27	Album	T&N	
Ghoti Hook	Two Years to Never	2000-07-06	Album	T&N	
Fanmail	Fanmail 2000	2000-08-03	Album	T&N	
Extol	Synergy	2000-08-12	Album	SSR	Licensed from Century Media
Squad Five-O	Bombs Over Broadway	2000-08-15	Album	T&N	Cover was changed after 9/11
Various	Latin Praise	2000-08-15	Compilation	BEC	
Various	Tooth & Nail Videography (1993-1999)	2000-08-15	DVD	T&N	
The Company	The Company	2000-08-29	Album	BEC	
The Juliana Theory	Emotion is Dead	2000-08-29	Album	T&N	
Fine China	When the World Sings	2000-09-14	Album	T&N	
Ill Harmonics	An Octave Above the Original	2000-09-26	Album	Uprock	
Dogwood	Building a Better Me	2000-09-28	Album	T&N	
The O.C. Supertones	Loud and Clear	2000-10-10	Album	BEC	
Various	Songs From the Penalty Box Vol. 4	2000-10-10	Compilation	T&N	
Calibretto 13	Enter the Danger Brigade	2000-10-12	Album	T&N	
Ace Troubleshooter	Ace Troubleshooter	2000-10-24	Album	BEC	
Living Sacrifice	The Hammering Process	2000-10-26	Album	SSR	
Various	Sinner's Prayer	2000-11-07	Compilation	BEC	
Blenderhead	Figureheads on the Forefront of Pop Culture	2000-11-23	Album	T&N	
Embodyment	Hold Your Breath	2001	Album	SSR	
Eso-Charis	Eso-Charis	2001	Album	SSR	Reissue
Flight 180	Girls & Boys	2001	Album	BEC	
No Innocent Victim	Tipping the Scales	2001	Album	SSR	Licensed from Victory Records
Luti-Kriss	Throwing Myself	2001	Album	SSR	
Soapbox	A Divided Man	2001	Album	SSR	
Stretch Arm Strong	A Revolution Transmission	2001	Album	SSR	
Various	Safety First - 2001 Sampler	2001	Compilation	T&N	
Various	New Musiq Vol. 2	2001-01-02	Compilation	PM	
Soul Embraced	This Is My Blood	2002-01-08	Album	SSR	
The Dingees	The Crucial Conspiracy	2001-01-11	Album	T&N	
Ninety Pound Wuss	Hierarchy of Snakes (Live)	2001-01-11	Live	T&N	Not Sold in Stores
Puller	What's Mine at Twilight	2001-01-11	Album	T&N	
Starflyer 59	Easy Come Easy Go	2001-01-21	Compilation	T&N	
Ultrabeat	Beyond the Stars	2001-01-23	Album	BEC	
Element 101	Stereo Girl	2001-02-01	Album	T&N	
Various	This is Solid State Vol. 2	2001-02-13	Compilation	SSR	
Craig's Brother	Lost at Sea	2001-02-27	Album	T&N	Unpromoted and undistributed
Flight 180	Girls and Boys	2001-02-27	Album	BEC	
Zao	Self-Titled	2001-02-27	Album	SSR	
Beloved	The Running	2001-02-28	EP	SSR	Reissue
The Deluxtone Rockets	Green Room Blues	2001-03-15	Album	T&N	
Further Seems Forever	The Moon is Down	2001-03-15	Album	T&N	
Various	Any Given Day Vol. 2: Earth to Heaven	2001-03-27	Compilation	BEC	
Various	Cheapskates Vol. 2	2001-03-31	Compilation	BEC	
Plankeye	Strange Exchange	2001-04-10	Album	BEC	
Cadet	Cadet	2001-04-24	Album	BEC	
All Wound Up	Hero	2001-05-08	Album	T&N	
Various	Start Right Here: Remembering the Life of Keith Green	2001-05-08	Tribute album	BEC	
Hangnail	Facing Changes	2001-05-22	Album	BEC	
Mars Ill	Raw Material	2001-06-05	Album	UpRok	Reissue
Starflyer 59	Leave Here a Stranger	2001-06-05	Album	T&N	
Peace 586	586	2001-06-19	Album	BEC	
Hangnail	The Acoustic EP	2001-07-03	EP	BEC	
Calibretto 13	From the Secret Files of the Danger Brigade	2001-07-04	EP	T&N	Not sold in stores
Side Walk Slam	Past Remains	2001-07-05	Album	T&N	
The Undecided	More to See	2001-07-19	Album	T&N	
Hopesfall	No Wings to Speak of	2001-08-08	EP	T&N	Acquired from Takehold Records
Crash Rickshaw	Crash Rickshaw	2001-08-16	Album	T&N	
Joy Electric	The White Songbook	2001-08-28	Album	BEC	
Joy Electric	The White Songbook: Unmixed/ Unmastered songs from the full length album	2001-08-28	Single	T&N	
Dogwood	Matt Aragon	2001-09-13	Album	T&N	
Lost Dogs	Real Men Cry	2001-09-25	Album	BEC	
The Huntingtons	Songs in the Key of You	2001-10-11	Album	T&N	
The Juliana Theory	Music from Another Room	2001-10-23	EP	T&N	
Various	Happy Christmas Vol. 3	2001-10-23	Christmas Compilation	BEC	
Stavesacre	Collective	2001-10-25	Compilation	T&N	
.rod laver	In a Perfect World	2001-11-06	Album	BEC	
Tunnel Rats	Tunnel Vision	2001-11-06	Album	UpRok	
The Deadlines	Fashion Over Function	2001-11-08	Album	T&N	
Deepspace5	The Night We Called It a Day	2001-11-20	Album	UpRok	
Various	UpRok Sampler	2001-11-20	Compilation	UpRok	
Few Left Standing	Regeneration of Self	2002	Album	SSR	Acquired from Takehold Records
Few Left Standing	Wormwood	2002	Album	SSR	Acquired from Takehold Records
Still Breathing	September	2002	Album	SSR	
Various	I'm Your Biggest Fan Vol. 2	2002	Compilation	T&N	
Various	What on Earth?!	2002	Compilation	T&N	
Various	Any Given Day Vol. 3: Old Soul for New Voices	2002-01-29	Compilation	BEC	
Underoath	The Changing of Times	2002-02-26	Album	SSR, T&N	Acquired from Takehold Records
Various	Tooth & Nail Video Compilation, Vol. 7	2002-02-26	DVD	T&N	
Various	This is Solid State Vol. 3	2002-02-26	Compilation, DVD	SSR	
Calibretto 13	Adventures in Tokyo	2002-02-28	Album	T&N	
Two Thirty Eight	Regulate the Chemicals	2002-03-14	Album	T&N	Reissue, Acquired from Takehold Records
The O.C. Supertones	Live! Volume One	2002-03-26	Live	T&N	
Various	E-Praise	2002-03-26	Compilation	BEC	
Slick Shoes	Slick Shoes	2002-03-28	Album	T&N	
The Blamed	Give Us Barrabbas	2002-04-25	Album	T&N	
Side Walk Slam	Give Back	2002-05-03		T&N	
Havalina	Space, Love, & Bullfighting	2002-05-09	Album	T&N	
MxPx	Ten Years and Running	2002-05-09	Compilation	T&N	
Joy Electric	The Art and Craft of Popular Music	2002-06-??	Compilation	BEC	
Dead Poetic	Four Wall Blackmail	2002-06-04	Album	SSR, T&N	
Ace Troubleshooter	The Madness of the Crowds	2002-06-18	Album	T&N	
mewithoutYou	[A→B] Life	2002-06-18	Album	T&N	
Various	Cheapskates Vol. 3	2002-06-18	Compilation	BEC	
Starflyer 59	Can't Stop Eating	2002-06-26	EP	T&N	
Various	Songs From the Penalty Box Vol. 5	2002-07-02	Compilation	T&N	
Zao	Parade of Chaos	2002-07-10	Album	SSR	
Plankeye	Wings to Fly	2002-07-18	Album	BEC, T&N	
Norma Jean	Bless The Martyr & Kiss The Child	2002-08-13	Album	SSR	
Bleach	Again, for the First Time	2002-08-15	Album	T&N	
Element 101	More Than Motion	2002-08-29	Album	T&N	
Mortal	Nu-En-Jin	2002-09-12	Album	T&N	
Living Sacrifice	Conceived in Fire	2002-09-12	Album	SSR	
Project 86	Truthless Heroes	2002-09-12	Album	T&N	
Poor Old Lu	The Waiting Room	2002-09-24	Album	T&N	
Two Thirty Eight	You Should Be Living	2002-09-26	Album	T&N	
Bon Voyage	The Right Amount	2002-10-10	Album	T&N	
Demon Hunter	Demon Hunter	2002-10-22	Album	SSR	
Various	80's Tribute Volume One	2002-11-05	Compilation	T&N	
Halo Friendlies	Get Real	2002-11-07	Album	T&N	
The O.C. Supertones	Hi-Fi Revival	2002-11-07	Album	T&N	
Too Bad Eugene	Moonlighting	2002-11-19	Album	T&N	
Various	UpRok Mixtape Vol. 1	2002-11-19	Compilation	UpRok	
Norma Jean/mewithoutYou	Norma Jean / mewithoutyou	2002-12-14	Split EP	SSR	
Various	BEC Recordings/Uprok Records Summer Sampler 2003	2003	Compilation	BEC, UpRok	
Various	Here & Now	2003	Compilation	BEC	
Various	Solid State: Spring/Summer Sampler 2003	2003	Compilation	SSR	
Dogwood	Seismic	2003-01-16	Album	T&N	
Furthermore,	She and I	2003-01-16	Album	T&N	
Further Seems Forever	How to Start a Fire	2003-02-11	Album	T&N	
Holland	Photographs & Tidalwaves	2003-02-11	Album	T&N	
Zao	All Else Failed	2003-02-19	Album	SSR	Reissue, Re-recording
Mae	Destination: Beautiful	2003-02-25	Album	T&N	
Soul Embraced	Immune	2003-02-25	Album	SSR	
Ghoti Hook	Rest in Peace: Live	2003-02-27	Live	T&N	
Ghoti Hook	Retrospective	2003-02-27	Compilation	T&N	
Squad Five-O	Squad Five-O	2003-03-12	Album	T&N	
Brave Saint Saturn	The Light of Things Hoped For	2003-03-13	Album	T&N	
Joy Electric	The Tick Tock Treasury	2003-03-13	Album	T&N	
Fine China	You Make Me Hate Music	2003-03-14	Album	T&N	
Various	X-2003	2003-04-01	Compilation	BEC	
Slow Coming Day	Farewell to the Familiar	2003-04-22	Album	T&N	
Anberlin	Blueprints for the Black Market	2003-05-06	Album	T&N	
Lucerin Blue	Tales of the Knife	2003-05-08	Album	T&N	
Starflyer 59	Old	2003-05-08	Album	T&N	
The Agony Scene	The Agony Scene	2003-06-10	Album	SSR	
Beloved	Failure On	2003-06-24	Album	SSR	
Watashi Wa	The Love of Life	2003-06-24	Album	T&N	
Figure Four	Suffering the Loss	2003-07-08	Album	SSR	
Grand Incredible	G.I.gantic	2003-07-08	Album	T&N	
Hangnail	Transparent	2003-07-10	Album	T&N	
FM Static	What Are You Waiting For?	2003-07-22	Album	T&N	
Various	The Nail, Vol. 8	2003-07-22	DVD	T&N	
The Juliana Theory	Live 10.13.2001	2003-08-05	Live	T&N	
Stretch Arm Strong	Engage	2003-08-19	Album	SSR	
Various	Cheapskates Vol. 4	2003-08-19	Compilation	BEC	
Spoken	A Moment of Imperfect Clarity	2003-09-02	Album	T&N	
Side Walk Slam	...And We Drive	2003-09-16	Album	T&N	
Thousand Foot Krutch	Phenomenon	2003-09-18	Album	T&N	
Various	UpRok Mixtape Vol. 2	2003-09-30	Compilation	UpRok	
Joy Electric	The Magic of Christmas	2003-10-09	Album	T&N	
Bleach	Astronomy	2003-10-21	Album	T&N	
Fighting Jacks	The Dying Art of Life	2003-10-21	Album	T&N	
Various	Air One Sampler Vol. 3	2003-10-21	Compilation	BEC	
Various	This is Solid State Vol. 4	2003-10-21	Compilation, DVD	SSR	
Two Thirty Eight	[El Libro De Recuerdos	2003-11-06	Double Reprint	T&N	
Slick Shoes	The Biggest and the Best	2003-11-06	Compilation	T&N	
Various	The Nail, Vol. 1	2003-11-18	Compilation	T&N	
Various	10th Anniversary Box Set	2003-12-02	Compilation	T&N	
Zao	Legendary	2003-12-17	Compilation	SSR	
Various	BEC Music	2004	Compilation	BEC	
.rod laver	Rudolph Wayne Vs. The Man	2004-01-01	Album	UpRok	
Emery	The Weak's End	2004-01-15	Album	T&N	
Aaron Sprinkle	Lackluster	2004-02-10	Album	T&N	
Starflyer 59	I Am the Portuguese Blues	2004-02-24	Album	T&N	
Various	The Classics: Hard	2004-02-24	Compilation	T&N	
Various	The Classics: Rock	2004-02-24	Compilation	T&N	
Haste The Day	Burning Bridges	2004-03-09	Album	SSR	
Ace Troubleshooter	It's Never Enough	2004-03-23	Album	T&N	
Officer Negative	The Death Campaign Project	2004-03-23	Album	SSR	
Various	Empty Me, Volume One	2004-03-23	Compilation	BEC	
Dead Poetic	New Medicines	2004-04-06	Album	SSR	
Various	X 2004	2004-04-06	Compilation, DVD	BEC	
Dogwood	Reverse, Then Forward Again	2004-04-20	Compilation	T&N	
Training for Utopia	Technical Difficulties	2004-04-20	Compilation	SSR	
Demon Hunter	Summer of Darkness	2004-05-04	Album	SSR	
The River Bends	And Flows into the Sea	2004-05-18	Album	T&N	
Joy Electric	Hello, Mannequin	2004-06-01	Album	T&N	
Project 86	Songs to Burn Your Bridges By	2004-06-01	Album	T&N	Reissue
The O.C. Supertones	Revenge of The O.C. Supertones	2004-06-14	Album	T&N	
Underoath	They're Only Chasing Safety	2004-06-15	Album	SSR, T&N	Original
Hawk Nelson	Letters to the President	2004-07-13	Album	T&N	
Various	The Nail, Vol. 2	2004-07-13	Compilation	T&N	
Further Seems Forever	Hide Nothing	2004-08-24	Album	T&N	
Thousand Foot Krutch	Set It Off	2004-09-07	Album	T&N	Reissue
mewithoutYou	Catch for Us the Foxes	2004-10-05	Album	T&N	
Showbread	No Sir, Nihilism Is Not Practical	2004-10-19	Album	SSR	
Various	This is Solid State Vol. 5	2004-10-19	Compilation, DVD	SSR	
He Is Legend	I Am Hollywood	2004-11-02	Album	SSR	
The Chariot	Everything Is Alive, Everything Is Breathing, Nothing Is Dead, and Nothing Is Bleeding	2004-11-16	Album	SSR	
Far-Less	Turn to the Bright EP	2004-11-16	EP	T&N	
Mae	Destination: B-Sides	2004-11-16	B-Sides	T&N	
Beloved	Kiss It Goodbye: The Final Show	2005	DVD	SSR	
The Huntingtons	Growing Up Is No Fun: The Standards '95–'05	2005	Compilation	T&N	
Various	Tooth and Nail vs. Solid State	2005	Compilation	T&N, SSR	
Anberlin	Never Take Friendship Personal	2005-02-01	Album	T&N	
The O.C. Supertones	Unite	2005-02-01	Album	T&N	
Bleach	Farewell Old Friends	2005-03-01	Album	T&N	
Norma Jean	O God, the Aftermath	2005-03-01	Album	SSR	Original, Deluxe
The O.C. Supertones	Faith of a Child	2005-03-01	Album	T&N	
Living Sacrifice	In Memoriam	2005-03-29	Compilation	SSR	
Mae	The Everglow	2005-03-29	Album	T&N	
Starflyer 59	Talking Voice vs. Singing Voice	2005-04-12	Album	T&N	
Discover America	Psychology	2005-04-26	Album	T&N	
Extol	The Blueprint Dives	2005-05-03	Album	SSR	Licensed from Century Media
Waking Ashland	Composure)	2005-05-10	Album	T&N	
Various	The Nail: Tooth & Nail Video, Vol. 9	2005-06-07	DVD	T&N	
Various	This is Solid State: The DVD	2005-06-07	DVD	SSR	
Various	X 2005	2005-06-07	Compilation, DVD	BEC	
As Cities Burn	Son, I Loved You at Your Darkest	2005-06-21	Album	SSR	
Haste The Day	When Everything Falls	2005-06-28	Album	SSR	
Starflyer 59	Starflyer 59 (Gold)	2005-06-28	Album	T&N	Extended
Starflyer 59	Starflyer 59 (Silver)	2005-06-28	Album	T&N	Extended, remastered edition including the She's the Queen EP
Terminal	How the Lonely Keep	2005-06-28	Album	T&N	
Number One Gun	Promises for the Imperfect	2005-07-19	Album	T&N	
Thousand Foot Krutch	The Art of Breaking	2005-07-19	Album	T&N	
Emery	The Question	2005-08-02	Album	T&N	Original
Joy Electric	The Ministry of Archers	2005-08-29	Album	T&N	
Becoming the Archetype	Terminate Damnation	2005-08-30	Album	SSR	
Spoken	Last Chance to Breathe	2005-08-30	Album	T&N	
Project 86	...And the Rest Will Follow	2005-09-27	Album	T&N	
Project 86	Subject to Change: The Making of "...And The Rest Will Follow"	2005-09-27	DVD	T&N	
Hawk Nelson	Letters to the President	2005-10-04	Album	T&N	Deluxe
Underoath	They're Only Chasing Safety	2005-10-04	Album	T&N	Deluxe
Various	Tooth & Nail vs. Solid State: The Videos	2005-10-16	DVD	T&N	
Bleach	Audio/Visual	2005-10-25	Compilation, DVD	T&N	
Demon Hunter	The Triptych	2005-10-25	Album	SSR	Original, Deluxe
Various	Happy Christmas Vol. 4	2005-10-25	Compilation	BEC	
August Burns Red	Thrill Seeker	2005-11-08	Album	SSR	
Various	You Can't Handle the Tooth Vol. 1	2005-11-22	Compilation	T&N	
The Chariot	Unsung EP	2005-12-06	EP	SSR	
Various	One Dark Summer	2006	Compilation	SSR	
Various	The Nail, Vol. 3	2006	DVD	T&N	
Sullivan	Hey, I'm a Ghost	2006-01-24	Album	T&N	
Watashi Wa	Eager Seas	2006-01-24	Album	T&N	
Far-Less	Everyone is Out to Get Us	2006-02-07	Album	T&N	
The Juliana Theory	A Small Noise	2006-02-07	Compilation	T&N	
The Fold	This Too Shall Pass	2006-02-21	Album	T&N	
The Lonely Hearts	Paper Tapes	2006-03-07	Album	T&N	
Further Seems Forever	Hope This Finds You Well	2006-03-21	Compilation	T&N	
Hawk Nelson	Smile, It's the End of the World	2006-04-04	Album	T&N	
Various	X 2006	2006-04-04	Compilation	BEC	
Mae	The Everglow	2006-04-18	Album	T&N	Deluxe
Run Kid Run	This Is Who We Are	2006-05-16	Album	T&N	
The Classic Crime	Albatross	2006-05-23	Album	T&N	
Various	Livin' It	2006-06-01	DVD	T&N	
Fair	The Best Worst-Case Scenario	2006-06-06	Album	T&N	
Underoath	Define the Great Line	2006-06-20	Album	SSR, T&N	Original, Deluxe
FM Static	Critically Ashamed	2006-08-01	Album	T&N	
Showbread	Age of Reptiles	2006-08-01	Album	T&N	
Destroy the Runner	Saints	2006-09-12	Album	SSR	
Norma Jean	Redeemer	2006-09-12	Album	SSR	
Starflyer 59	My Island	2006-09-12	Album	T&N	
mewithoutYou	Brother, Sister	2006-09-26	Album	T&N	
He Is Legend	Suck Out the Poison	2006-10-03	Album	SSR	
Jonezetta	Popularity	2006-10-03	Album	T&N	
Twelve Gauge Valentine	Shock Value	2006-10-03	Album	SSR	
Various	X 2007	2006-10-03	Compilation	BEC	
Dead Poetic	Vices	2006-10-31	Album	T&N	
Various	Dominate Volume One	2006-11-20	DVD	T&N	
Emery	The Question	2006-11-21	Album	T&N	Deluxe
Inhale Exhale	The Lost. The Sick. The Sacred.	2006-11-21	Album	SSR	
MxPx	Let It Happen	2006-11-21	Album	T&N	Deluxe
Anberlin	Godspeed EP	2006-12-26	EP	T&N	
The Brothers Martin	The Brothers Martin	2007-01-23	Album	T&N	
Anberlin	Cities	2007-02-20	Album	T&N	Original, Deluxe
Life in Your Way	Waking Giants	2007-03-06	Album	SSR	
Haste The Day	Pressure the Hinges	2007-03-20	Album	SSR	
Joy Electric	The Otherly Opus	2007-03-20	Album	T&N	
Various	This is Solid State Vol. 6	2007-03-20	Compilation	SSR	
The Almost	Southern Weather	2007-04-03	Album	T&N	original, iTunes
The Chariot	The Fiancée	2007-04-03	Album	SSR	
The Fold	Secrets Keep You Sick	2007-05-02	Album	T&N	
Becoming the Archetype	The Physics of Fire	2007-05-08	Album	SSR	
Neon Horse	Neon Horse	2007-05-08	Album	T&N	
Sullivan	Cover Your Eyes	2007-06-05	Album	T&N	
August Burns Red	Messengers	2007-06-19	Album	SSR	
Project 86	Rival Factions	2007-06-19	Album	T&N	
Ruth	Secondhand Dreaming	2007-06-26	Album	T&N	
MxPx	Secret Weapon	2007-07-17	Album	T&N	Original, Deluxe
Underoath	777	2007-07-17	DVD	SSR, T&N	
Starflyer 59	Ghosts of the Future	2007-07-30	Box Set	T&N, BT	10x vinyl 7"
The Send	Cosmos	2007-07-31	Album	T&N	
Surrogate	Love is for the Rich	2007-08-08	Album	T&N	
As Cities Burn	Come Now, Sleep	2007-08-14	Album	T&N	
Cry of the Afflicted	The Unveiling	2007-08-14	Album	SSR	
Thousand Foot Krutch	The Flame in All of Us	2007-09-18	Album	T&N	Original, Deluxe
Spoken	Spoken	2007-09-25	Album	T&N	
Emery	I'm Only a Man	2007-10-02	Album	T&N	Original, Deluxe
Various	X 2008	2007-10-02	Compilation, DVD	BEC	
Far-Less	A Toast to Bad Taste	2007-10-23	Album	T&N	
Oh, Sleeper	When I Am God	2007-10-23	Album	SSR	
The Classic Crime	Acoustic EP: Seattle Sessions	2007-11-06	EP	T&N	
A Dream Too Late	Intermission to the Moon	2007-11-06	Album	T&N	
Anberlin	Lost Songs	2007-11-20	B-Sides	T&N	
Dead Poetic	The Finest	2007-11-20	Compilation	T&N	
Various	Buried Alive!: A Solid State Records DVD Sampler	2007-11-20	DVD	SSR	
Various	Tooth & Nail/Solid State Records 2008 Fuel Sampler	2008	Compilation	T&N	Free Digital Sampler
Number One Gun	The North Pole Project	2008-01-15	Album	T&N	
Various	Dominate Volume Two	2008-01-15	DVD	T&N	
Ivoryline	There Came a Lion	2008-02-05	Album	T&N	
Secret & Whisper	Great White Whale	2008-02-12	Album	T&N	
Children 18:3	Children 18:3	2008-02-26	Album	T&N	
The O.C. Supertones	The Ultimate Collection	2008-03-11	Compilation	T&N	
Various	Tooth & Nail Records: The Ultimate Collection	2008-03-11	Compilation	T&N	
Search the City	A Fire So Big the Heavens Can See It	2008-04-01	Album	T&N	
Run Kid Run	Love at the Core	2008-04-29	Album	T&N	
Soul Embraced	Dead Alive	2008-04-29	Album	SSR	
Showbread	Anorexia	2008-05-13	Album	T&N	
Showbread	Nervosa	2008-05-13	Album	T&N	
Since October	This Is My Heart	2008-05-27	Album	T&N	
Joy Electric	My Grandfather, The Cubist	2008-05-27	Album	T&N	
Underoath	Survive, Kaleidoscope	2008-05-27	Live	SSR, T&N	
Bon Voyage	Lies	2008-06-24	Album	T&N	
Capital Lights	This Is an Outrage!	2008-07-08	Album	T&N	
The Classic Crime	The Silver Cord	2008-07-22	Album	T&N	
Haste the Day	Dreamer	2008-8-14	Album	SSR	
Family Force 5	Dance or Die	2008-08-19	Album	T&N	
The Fold	Stargazer EP	2008-08-26	EP	T&N	
Underoath	Lost in the Sound of Separation	2008-09-02	Album	SSR, T&N	
Jonezetta	Cruel to Be Young	2008-09-16	Album	T&N	
Trenches	The Tide Will Swallow Us Whole	2008-09-16	Album	SSR	
The Becoming	Vol. 1	2008-09-30	Album	T&N	
Copeland	You Are My Sunshine	2008-10-14	Album	T&N	Original, Deluxe
Emery	While Broken Hearts Prevail	2008-10-28	EP	T&N	
Ruth	Anorak	2008-10-28	Album	T&N	
Starflyer 59	Dial M	2008-10-28	Album	T&N	
Various	X Christmas	2008-10-28	Compilation	BEC	
Corey Crowder	Gold and the Sand	2008-11-11	Album	T&N	
Becoming the Archetype	Dichotomy	2008-11-24	Album	SSR	
The Almost	No Gift to Bring	2008-11-25	EP	T&N	
Various	Tooth & Nail/Solid State Records 2009 Fuel Sampler	2009	Compilation	T&N	Free Digital Sampler
Copeland	You Are My Sunshine (LP Edition)	2009-01-27	Vinyl	T&N	
And Then There Were None	Who Speaks for Planet Earth?	2009-02-24	Album	T&N	
Copeland	The Grey Man EP	2009-02-24	EP	T&N	
The Drawing Room	The Drawing Room	2009-03-24	Album	T&N	
Mxpx	On the Cover II	2009-03-24	Album	T&N	
Various	Dominate, Vol. 3	2009-03-24	DVD	T&N	
FM static	Dear Diary	2009-04-07	Album	T&N	
Starflyer 59	Minor Keys EP	2009-04-07	EP	T&N	
Various	X 2009	2009-04-09	Compilation, DVD	BEC	
As Cities Burn	Hell or High Water	2009-04-21	Album	T&N	
Family Force 5	Dance or Die with a Vengeance	2009-05-19	Remixes	T&N	
mewithoutYou	It's All Crazy! It's All False! It's All a Dream! It's Alright	2009-05-19	Album	T&N	
Various	Songs From the Penalty Box Vol. 6	2009-05-19	Compilation	T&N	
Various	Songs From the Penalty Box Vol. 7	2009-05-19	Compilation	SSR	
Emery	...In Shallow Seas We Sail	2009-06-02	Album	T&N	
The Crucified	The Complete Collection	2009-06-30	Box Set, DVD	T&N	
Project 86	Picket Fence Cartel	2009-07-14	Album	T&N	
Surrogate	Popular Mechanics	2009-07-14	Album	T&N	
Neon Horse	Haunted Horse: Songs of Love, Defiance and Delusion	2009-07-28	Album	T&N	
Starflyer 59	Ghosts of the Past	2009-07-28	Compilation	T&N	
Showbread	The Fear of God	2009-08-11	Album	T&N	
Ruth	The Covers EP	2009-08-25	EP	T&N	
Oh, Sleeper	Son of the Morning	2009-8-25	Album	SSR	
Thousand Foot Krutch	Welcome to the Masquerade	2009-09-08	Album	T&N	
Queens Club	Nightmarer EP	2009-09-18	EP	T&N	
The Letter Black	Breaking the Silence	2009-09-22	EP	T&N	
Mae	(m)orning	2009-09-22	Album	T&N	
Hawk Nelson	Live Life Loud	2009-09-22	Album	T&N	
The Almost	Monster EP	2009-10-06	EP	T&N	
Family Force 5	Family Force 5 Christmas Pageant	2009-10-06	Album	T&N	
Gwen Stacy	A Dialogue	2009-10-20	Album	SSR	
Becoming the Archetype	Necrotizing Fasciitis	2009-10-23	Non-Album Digital Single	SSR	
The Almost	Monster Monster	2009-11-03	Album	T&N	
Joy Electric	Favorites at Play	2009-11-03	Album	T&N	
Anberlin	Blueprints for City Friendships: The Anberlin Anthology	2009-11-17	Box Set	T&N	Contains Anberlin's first three albums
The Crucified	The Pillars of Humanity	2009-11-17	Album	T&N	Reissue

== 2010s ==
Artist	Album	Release Date	Format	Imprint	Editions/Notes
Various	Tooth & Nail/Solid State Records 2010 Fuel Sampler	2010	Compilation	T&N	Free Digital Sampler
Living Sacrifice	The Infinite Order	2010-01-26	Album	SSR	
Number One Gun	To the Secrets and Knowledge	2010-01-26	Album	T&N	
Fair	Disappearing World	2010-02-09	Album	T&N	
Haste the Day	Dreamer	2010-03-02	Album	SSR	Digital Edition Re-Release
Adie	Just You and Me	2010-03-09	Album	BEC	
Demon Hunter	The World Is a Thorn	2010-03-09	Album	SSR	Regular, Deluxe
Poema	Sing It Now	2010-03-23	EP	T&N	
Queens Club	Young Giant	2010-03-23	EP	T&N	
Mae	(a)fternoon	2010-03-30	Album	T&N	
Manafest	The Chase	2010-03-30	Album	BEC	
Emery	Are You Listening?	2010-04-06	Box Set	T&N	contains Emery's first three albums
The Classic Crime	Vagabonds	2010-04-06	Album	T&N	
Secret & Whisper	Teenage Fantasy	2010-04-06	Album	T&N	
Various	X 2010	2010-04-06	Compilation	BEC	
Jaymes Reunion	Everything You've Been Looking For	2010-04-20	Album	BEC	
Sent By Ravens	Our Graceful Words	2010-04-20	Album	T&N	
Write This Down	Write This Down	2010-04-20	Album	T&N	
The Letter Black	Hanging on by a Thread	2010-05-04	Album	T&N	
The O.C. Supertones	ReUnite	2010-05-18	Compilation	BEC	
To Speak of Wolves	Myself < Letting Go	2010-05-18	Album	SSR	
Hawk Nelson	Hawkology	2010-06-08	Box Set	BEC	Contains Hawk Nelson's 1st three albums
MyChildren MyBride	Lost Boy	2010-06-08	Album	SSR	
Rapture Ruckus	Rapture Ruckus	2010-06-08	EP	BEC	
Since October	Life, Scars, Apologies	2010-06-08	Album	T&N	
Children 18:3	Rain's 'a Comin'	2010-06-29	Album	T&N	
Haste the Day	Attack of the Wolf King	2010-06-29	Album	SSR	Regular, Deluxe
Kutless	Kutless: The Beginning	2010-07-13	Box Set	BEC	Contains Kutless's 1st three albums
Ivoryline	Vessels	2010-07-27	Album	T&N	
The Museum	Let Love Win	2010-07-27	Album	BEC	
Starflyer 59	The Changing of the Guard	2010-08-10	Album	T&N	
Jeremy Camp	We Cry Out: The Worship Project	2010-08-24	Album	BEC	
The Showdown	Blood in the Gears	2010-08-24	Album	SSR	
Josh White	Achor	2010-09-22	Album	BEC	
August Burns Red	Home	2010-09-28	CD/DVD	SSR	
Bebo Norman	Ocean	2010-09-28	Album	BEC	
Various	Happy Christmas Vol. 5	2010-09-28	Compilation	T&N	
Various	O Come All Ye Faithful	2010-09-28	Compilation	BEC	
The Almost	Monster Monster [Deluxe Edition]	2010-10-25	Album	T&N	
The Almost	Monster Monster EP	2010-10-25	EP	T&N	
Various	Rock of Ages	2010-10-26	Album	BEC	
Underoath	Ø (Disambiguation)	2010-11-09	Album	T&N, SSR	
Poema	Once a Year: A Poema Christmas EP	2010-11-16	EP	T&N	
August Burns Red	Little Drummer Boy	2010-11-22	Single	SSR	
Haste the Day	Concerning the Way It Was	2010-11-22	Box Set	SSR	Contains Haste the Day's 1st three albums
Norma Jean	Birds and Microscopes and Bottles of Elixirs and Raw Steak and a Bunch of Songs	2010-11-22	Box Set	SSR	Contains Norma Jean's 1st three albums
As They Sleep	Dynasty	2010-11-23	Album	SSR	
Rocky Loves Emily	American Dream	2010-11-23	Album	T&N	
FM Static	3 Out of 4 Ain't Bad	2010-11-23	Box Set	T&N	Contains FM Static's 1st three albums
I Am Empire	Kings	2011-01-25	Album	T&N	
Hawk Nelson	Crazy Love	2011-02-08	Album	T&N, BEC	Packaged with The Light Sides
The Famine	The Architects of Guilt	2011-02-15	Album	SSR	
Aaron Gillespie	Anthem Song	2011-03-08	Album	T&N, BEC	
Demon Hunter	Death, A Destination	2011-03-08	Box Set	SSR	Contains Demon Hunter's 1st three albums
Mae	(e)vening	2011-03-08	CD/DVD	T&N	
Ryan Stevenson	Yesterday, Today, Forever	2011-03-22	Album	BEC	
The Letter Black	Hanging on by a Thread Sessions, Vol. 1	2011-03-22	EP	T&N	
Becoming the Archetype	Celestial Completion	2011-03-29	Album	SSR	
Emery	We Do What We Want	2011-03-29	Album	T&N, SSR	
FM Static	My Brain Says Stop, But My Heart Says Go!	2011-04-05	Album	T&N	
Various	X 2011	2011-04-05	Album	BEC	
Hyland	Weights & Measures	2011-05-03	Album	T&N	
August Burns Red	Leveler	2011-06-21	Album	SSR	
Sainthood Reps	Monoculture	2011-08-09	Album	T&N	
Icon for Hire	Scripted	2011-08-23	Album	T&N	
Oh, Sleeper	Children of Fire	2011-09-06	Album	SSR	
Family Force 5	III	2011-10-18	Album	T&N	
Run Kid Run	Patterns	2011-11-15	Album	T&N	
Blessed by a Broken Heart	Feel The Power	2012-01-24	Album	T&N	
Nine Lashes	World We View	2012-02-14	Album	T&N	
Sent by Ravens	Mean What You Say	2012-02-28	Album	T&N	
MyChildren MyBride	MyChildren MyBride	2012-03-13	Album	SSR	
Demon Hunter	True Defiance	2012-04-10	Album	SSR	
Demon Hunter	True Defiance	2012-04-10	Album	SSR	Deluxe Edition
Becoming the Archetype	Celestial Completion	2012-04-17	Album	SSR	
Rocky Loves Emily	Secrets Don't Make Friends	2012-04-24	Album	T&N	
Haste the Day	Best of the Best	2012-04-24	Compilation	SSR	
To Speak of Wolves	Find Your Worth, Come Home	2012-05-22	Album	SSR	
Write This Down	Lost Weekend	2012-06-05	Album	T&N	
Children 18:3	On The Run	2012-06-19	Album	T&N	
The Overseer	We Search, We Dig	2012-06-19	Album	SSR	
Wolves at the Gate	Captors	2012-07-03	Album	SSR	
Becoming the Archetype	I Am	2012-09-18	Album	SSR	
August Burns Red	August Burns Red Presents: Sleddin' Hill	2012-10-09	Album	SSR	
Underoath	Anthology: 1999-2013	2012-11-06	Compilation	SSR	
Wolves at the Gate	The King	2012-12-04	Single	SSR	
My Heart to Fear	Lost Between Brilliance and Insanity	2012-12-04	EP	SSR	
Fit For a King	Creation/Destruction	2013-03-12	Album		
The Almost	Fear Inside Our Bones	2013-06-11	Album	T&N	
August Burns Red	Rescue & Restore	2013-06-25	Album	SSR	
My Heart to Fear	Algorithm	2013-07-09	Album	SSR	
The Ongoing Concept	Saloon	2013-07-23	Album	SSR	
Underoath	Act of Depression	2013-08-20	Album	T&N, SSR	Re-Issue
Underoath	Cries of the Past	2013-08-20	Album	T&N, SSR	Re-Issue
Icon for Hire	Icon for Hire	2013-09-03	Album	T&N	
Love & Death	Between Here & Lost	2013-09-17	Album	T&N	Expanded Edition
Aaron Sprinkle	Water & Guns	2013-09-30	Album	BEC	
Wolves at the Gate	Back to School	2013-09-30	EP	SSR	
Thousand Foot Krutch	Made in Canada: The 1998-2010 Collection	2013-10-15	Compilation	T&N	Compilation featuring bast songs and one exclusive to the CD
The Letter Black	Rebuild	2013-11-11	Album	T&N	
Living Sacrifice	Ghost Thief	2013-11-11	Album	T&N	
Fit for a King	Descendants	2013-11-25	Album	SSR	
August Burns Red	Foreign & Familiar	2013-12-03	DVD	SSR	
Number One Gun	This is All We Know	2014-01-14	Album	T&N	
The Overseer	Rest and Let Go	2014-03-04	Album	SSR	
Demon Hunter	Extremist	2014-03-18	Album	SSR	
New Empire	In a Breath	2014-04-29	Album	T&N	
Midnight Alive	Forever	2014-05-06	Album	T&N	
Artifex Pereo	Time in Place	2014-05-27	Album	T&N	
Wolves at the Gate	VxV	2014-06-10	Album	SSR	
Forevermore	Telos	2014-07-22	Album	SSR	
Anberlin	Lowborn	2014-07-22	Album	T&N	
Various Artists	No New Kinda Story	2014-08-25	DVD	T&N	
Fit for a King	Slave to Nothing	2014-10-14	Album	SSR	
Kings Kaleidoscope	Becoming Who We Are	2014-10-28	Album	T&N	
Silent Planet	The Night God Slept	2014-11-10	Album	SSR	
Copeland	Ixora	2014-11-24	Album	T&N	
Various Artists	Midnight Clear	2014-11-24	Compilation	SSR	Holiday Compilation released on Solid State
Hearts Like Lions	These Hands	2014-12-02	EP	T&N	
We Are the City	Violent	2015-03-24	Album	T&N	
Various Artists	Killing Floor 2 Soundtrack	2015-04-21	Compilation	SSR	Compilation for the video game Killing Floor 2
Children 18:3	Come In	2015-04-21	Album	T&N	
Anberlin	Never Take Friendship Personal - Live in New York City	2015-05-05	Live Album	T&N	
Wolves at the Gate	Reprise	2015-05-12	EP	SSR	
XXI	Memories	2015-05-18	Single	T&N	
Haste the Day	Coward	2015-05-19	Album	SSR	
The Ongoing Concept	Handmade	2015-06-16	Album	SSR	
Kings Kaleidoscope	Live In Focus	2015-06-29	EP	T&N	
Anberlin	Cities - Live In New York	2015-07-24	Album	T&N	
XXI	Inside Out	2015-09-18	Album	T&N	
Demon Hunter	Extremist	2015-10-30	Album	SSR	Deluxe Edition
We are the City	Above Club	2015-11-13	Album	T&N	
Anchor & Braille	Songs for the Late Night Drive Home	2016-02-05	Album	T&N	
Tyson Motsenbocker	Letters to Lost Loves	2016-03-04	Album	T&N	
Starflyer 59	Slow	2016-06-17	Album	T&N	
Kings Kaleidoscope	Beyond Control	2016-07-01	Album	BEC, T&N, GSR	
Silent Planet	Everything Was Sound	2016-07-01	Album	SRR	
Forevermore	Integral	2016-07-22	Album	SRR	
Aaron Gillespie	Out of the Badlands	2016-08-19	Album	T&N	
Artifex Pereo	Passengers	2016-09-09	Album	T&N	
Norma Jean	Polar Similar	2016-09-09	Album	SRR	
Citizens & Saints	A Mirror Dimly	2016-09-16	Album	GSR	
Fit for a King	Deathgrip	2016-10-07	Album	SRR	
Disciple	Long Live the Rebels	2016-10-14	Album	T&N	
Civilian	You Wouldn't Believe What Privilege Cost	2016-10-21	Album	T&N	
Wolves at the Gate	Types & Shadows	2016-11-04	Album	SRR	
The Eagle And Child	O Christmas	2016-12-02	EP	GSR	
Heart Like Lions	Make Your Move	2016-12-09	Single	T&N	
Matty Mullins	Unstoppable	2017-01-13	Single	BEC	Featuring Jordan Feliz
Kutless	King of My Heart	2017-01-27	Single	BEC	
Heart Like Lions	If I Never Speak Again	2017-02-17	Album	T&N	
David Dunn	Yellow Balloons	2017-02-17	Album	BEC	
Death Therapy	The Storm Before the Calm	2017-02-24	Album	SSR	
Aaron Sprinkle	Real Life	2017-03-24	Album	T&N	
Demon Hunter	Outlive	2017-03-31	Album	SSR	
Matty Mullins	Unstoppable	2017-04-13	Album	BEC	
Earth Groans	Renovate	2017-05-12	EP	SSR	
The Eagle And Child	Let's Run	2017-06-02	EP	GSR	
To Speak of Wolves	Dead in the Shadow	2017-07-21	Album	SSR	
Stephen Christian	Wildfires	2017-07-28	Album	BEC	
The Sing Team	Sing On!	2017-09-16	Album	GSR	
The Ongoing Concept	Places	2017-10-06	Album	SSR	
Phinehas	Dark Flag	2017-11-17	Album	SSR	
The Eagle And Child	O Christmas Volume II	2017-12-01	EP	GSR	
Alexander Fairchild	Too Young for New York	2018-01-26	Album	T&N	
LOYALS	Loyals	2018-02-02	Album	T&N	
Off Road Minivan	Spiral Gaze	2018-02-16	EP	T&N	
Le Voyageur	Finally	2018-05-11	Album	T&N	
Earth Groans	Rahab	2018-08-03	EP	SSR	
Fit for a King	Dark Skies	2018-09-14	Album	SSR	
Silent Planet	When the End Began	2018-11-02	Album	SSR	
Azusa	Heavy Yoke	2018-11-16	Album	SSR	
Citizens	Fear	2016-01-25	Album	GSR	
The Drowned God	I'll Always Be The Same	2019-01-25	Album	SSR	
Copeland	Blushing	2019-02-14	Album	T&N	
Demon Hunter	War	2019-03-01	Album	SSR	
Demon Hunter	Peace	2019-03-01	Album	SSR	
London Gatch	New Stories	2019-02-22	Album	BEC	
7eventh Time Down	Brand New Day	2019-03-01	Album	BEC	
Mike Mains & The Branches	When We Were In Love	2019-04-05	Album	T&N	
Free Worship	Already Done	2019-04-19	Album	BEC	
Starflyer 59	Young In My Head	2019-04-26	Album	T&N	
Battledrums	Breakthrough	2019-05-03	Album	BEC	
Brian Ortize	Never Late	2019-05-24	Album	BEC	
The Sing Team	Live On!	2019-06-14	EP	GSR	
Tasha Layton	Love Running Wild	2019-06-28	EP	BEC	
Empty	From A Chemist's Point Of View	2019-07-09	EP	SSR	
Oh, Sleeper	Bloodied/Unbowed	2019-07-12	Album	SSR	
John Van Deusen	(I Am) Origami Pt. 3 - A Catacomb Hymn	2019-07-19	Album	T&N	
Wolves At The Gate	Eclipse	2019-07-26	Album	SSR	
RNW Music	When It Comes To You	2019-08-09	Album	BEC	
Ghost Ship	To The End	2019-08-09	Album	GSR	
Empty	Hope & The Loss Of It	2019-09-06	Album	SSR	
Disciple	Love Letter Kill Shot	2019-09-13	Album	T&N/BEC	
Paradise Now	Supernatural	2019-10-04	EP	T&N	
The Devil Wears Prada	The Act	2019-10-11	Album	SSR	
Norma Jean	All Hail	2019-10-25	Album	SSR	
The Sing Team	Kids Sing On!	2019-11-01	Album	GSR	
Mike Mains & The Branches	When We Were In Love (Deluxe Edition)	2019-11-15	Album	T&N	
Slick Shoes	Broadcasting Live	2019-11-22	Album	T&N	

== 2020s ==
Artist	Album	Release Date	Format	Imprint	Editions/Notes
We Are The City	RIP	2020-01-24	Album	T&N	
Silent Planet	The Night God Slept (Redux)	2020-01-24	Album	SSR	Re-recorded version of the 2014 album.
Tyson Motsenbocker	Someday I'll Make It All Up To You	2020-02-14	Album	T&N	
Earth Groans	Prettiest Of Things	2020-03-06	EP	SSR	
David Dunn	Perspectives	2020-03-27	Album	BEC	
Azusa	Loop Of Yesterdays	2020-04-10	Album	SSR	
Silent Planet	The Night God Slept (Instrumental)	2020-04-17	Album	SSR	Instrumental version.
The Devil Wears Prada	Live In London	2020-04-24	EP	SSR	
Silent Planet	Everything Was Sound (Instrumental)	2020-04-24	Album	SSR	Instrumental version.
Mantric	False Negative	2020-04-24	Album	SSR/T&N	
Silent Planet	When The End Began (Instrumental)	2020-05-01	Album	SSR	Instrumental version.
Tigerwine	Nothing Is For You	2020-05-01	Album	T&N	
River Valley Worship	ALTARS	2020-05-08	Album	BEC	
Off Road Minivan	Swan Dive	2020-05-15	Album	T&N	
Anchor & Braille	TENSION	2020-05-22	Album	T&N	
Lightworker	Fury By Failure	2020-06-12	Album	SSR	
FEARLESS BND	FEAR NOT	2020-06-26	Album	BEC	
Various Artists	Songs From The Penalty Box Vol. 8	2020-07-17	Compilation	T&N/SSR	
Lifelong	Above The Waves	2020-07-17	Album	SSR	
Acceptance	Wild	2020-07-24	EP	T&N	
KIDS	Lost Cities	2020-07-31	Album	T&N	
Tyson Motsenbocker	Summer Songs	2020-08-14	EP	T&N	Acoustic EP of select SDIMIAUTY songs.
Free Worship	En Vivo Desde Panama	2020-08-21	EP	BEC	
idle threat	Nothing Is Broken For Good	2020-08-21	EP	T&N	
I Am Empire	Another Man's Treasure	2020-08-28	EP	T&N	
Lion & Bear	Lion & Bear	2020-09-11	EP	BEC	
Tyson Motsenbocker	Fall Songs	2020-09-11	EP	T&N	Acoustic EP of select SDIMIAUTY songs.
Tasha Layton	Into The Sea	2020-09-18	EP	BEC	
A Jesus Church	Take Your Throne	2020-09-18	Album	BEC	
Fit For A King	The Path	2020-09-18	Album	SSR	
Slick Shoes	Rotation & Frequency	2020-09-25	Album	T&N	
Acceptance	Wild, Free	2020-10-02	Album	T&N	
Wolves At The Gate	Dawn	2020-10-09	EP	SSR	
Tyson Motsenbocker	Someday I'll Make It All Up To You (Acoustic)	2020-10-16	Album	T&N	
Earth Groans	Waste	2020-10-23	EP	SSR	
Paradise Now	Lockdown Mixtape	2020-10-30	EP	T&N	
London Gatch	Remember: Live At Seacoast	2020-11-20	Album	BEC	
Hangnail	Christmas Hymns	2020-12-04	EP	T&N	
Brian Ortize	Worship Collection	2020-12-04	Album	BEC	
River Valley Worship	The Ensemble Project	2021-02-12	EP	BEC	
Demon Hunter	Songs Of Death And Resurrection	2021-03-05	Album	SSR	
Jordan St. Cyr	Be My Defender	2021-03-12	EP	BEC	
Emilie Weiss	A Song Of Ascent	2021-03-12	EP	GSR	
Middle River Hymnal	Vol. I, Holy Week	2021-03-26	EP	GSR	
The Drowned God	Pale Home	2021-03-26	Album	SSR	
The Undertaking!	Funeral Psalms	2021-04-30	Album	SSR	
KingsPorch	Songs For The Simple Gathering: Volume 1	2021-05-07	EP	BEC	
Salt Creek	Our Own World	2021-05-14	EP	T&N	
The Devil Wears Prada	ZII	2021-05-21	EP	SSR	
Death Therapy	Melancholy Machines	2021-06-04	Album	T&N	
Tasha Layton	Look What You've Done	2021-06-11	EP	BEC	
Lion & Bear	Hollows	2021-06-25	Album	BEC	
Fit For A King & August Burns Red	Guardians Of The Path	2021-07-16	EP	SSR	
Paradise Now	We Never Die	2021-07-30	Album	T&N	
Mirours	dazzle.	2021-08-06	EP	T&N	
Spirit Breaker	Cura Nata	2021-08-06	Album	SSR	
Deep Al | Brindle	No Rush, No Curfew	2021-08-20	EP	T&N	
Phinehas	The Fire Itself	2021-08-27	Album	SSR	
Earth Groans	The Body	2021-09-03	EP	SSR	
Make Sure	Ninjutsu	2021-09-03	Album	T&N	
RNW Music	Hope (Live)	2021-09-17	Album	BEC	
Salt Creek	Out Of The Sky	2021-10-15	Album	T&N	
Lion Of Judah	Closer	2021-10-22	Album	BEC	
Empty	MADE OF FIRE	2021-10-22	Album	SSR	
Tasha Layton	This Is Christmas	2021-10-21	Album	BEC	
idle threat	Blurred Visions	2021-10-29	Album	T&N	
Mirours	Gilded Paradise	2021-11-05	Album	T&N	
Stephen Christian	Spirited	2021-11-05	Album	BEC	
Silent Planet	Iridescent	2021-11-12	Album	SSR	
Make Sure	Ninjutsu (Deluxe Edition)	2022-02-11	Album	T&N	
Jordan St. Cyr	Jordan St. Cyr	2022-03-04	Album	BEC	
River Valley AGES	AGES	2022-03-11	Album	BEC	
Wolves At The Gate	Eulogies	2022-03-11	Album	SSR	
Honor & Glory	Honor & Glory	2022-03-18	Album	BEC	
Tasha Layton	How Far	2022-05-13	Album	BEC	
Watashi Wa	People Like People	2022-05-20	Album	T&N	
orphantwin	Future Classic	2022-06-03	EP	SSR	
Valleyheart	Heal My Head	2022-06-03	Album	T&N	
River Valley Worship	Faith In Our Time	2022-06-10	Album	BEC	
Emery	Rub Some Dirt On It	2022-06-24	Album	T&N	
Free Worship	My Soul Sings	2022-07-08	Album	BEC	
Grace Union	Rising	2022-07-08	Album	BEC	
Opponent	Sentinel	2022-07-08	Album	SSR	
FEARLESS BND	Hope St. Revival	2022-08-05	Album	BEC	
Norma Jean	Deathrattle Sing For Me	2022-08-12	Album	SSR	
7eventh Time Down	By Faith	2022-08-19	Album	BEC	
Becoming The Archetype	Children Of The Great Extinction	2022-08-26	Album	SSR	
The Devil Wears Prada	Color Decay	2022-09-16	Album	SSR	
Wolves At The Gate	Eulogies Live Sessions	2022-09-23	EP	SSR	
Tyson Motsenbocker	Milk Teeth	2022-09-23	Album	T&N	
Acceptance	Wild, Free (Deluxe Edition)	2022-10-19	Album	T&N	
River Valley AGES	ALL AGES ADMITTED	2022-10-21	Album	BEC	
Zauntee	The Stonebrook Project	2022-10-28	Album	BEC	
Fit For A King	The Hell We Create	2022-10-28	Album	SSR	
Tasha Layton	This Is Christmas	2022-11-11	Album	BEC	
Wolves At The Gate	Lowborn EP	2022-11-18	EP	SSR	
Jordan St. Cyr	Jordan St. Cyr	2023-01-13	Album	BEC	
River Valley AGES	an ep of some songs u can read ur bible + journal to	2023-01-13	EP	BEC	
Deep AL Brindle	Late Night, Early Morning	2023-01-13	EP	T&N	
Earth Groans	Tongue Tied	2023-03-03	EP	SSR	
KingsPorch	God Is In This House	2023-03-10	EP	BEC	
The Ongoing Concept	Again	2023-03-31	Album	SSR	
Crossroads Music	I Will Remember	2023-03-31	Album	BEC	
Disciple	Skeleton Psalms	2023-04-28	Album	BEC	
David Dunn	Boys	2023-05-05	Album	BEC	
The Devil Wears Prada	Color Decay (Deluxe)	2023-05-05	Album	SSR	
Kevin Klein	Random Space	2023-05-12	EP	T&N	
Hunter Plake	Thunderbird 1	2023-05-12	EP	BEC	
Off Road Minivan	May This Keep You Safe From Harm	2023-06-23	Album	T&N	
Cory Asbury	Pioneer	2023-09-15	Album	BEC	
Mike Mains & The Branches	Memory Unfixed	2023-09-15	Album	T&N	
Wolves At The Gate	Lost In Translation	2023-09-22	Album	SSR	
Extol	Labyrinth of Ill / Exigency	2023-10-12	EP	SSR	
Hunter Plake	Thunderbird 2	2023-11-02	EP	BEC	
Silent Planet	SUPERBLOOM	2023-11-03	Album	SSR	
Starflyer 59 & The Rocky Valentines	Split EP	2023-12-08	EP	T&N	
Cory Asbury	My Inheritance	2023-12-15	EP	BEC	
River Valley AGES	Prayer Journal	2024-01-15	EP	BEC	
Zauntee	We Already Won	2024-02-23	Album	BEC	
