= Happy Christmas Vol. 2 =

Compilation album by Various
- Released: October 19, 1999
- Genre: Holiday
- Length: 49:40
- Label: BEC
- Producer: Brandon Ebel

Happy Christmas chronology
Happy Christmas (1998)	Happy Christmas Vol. 2 (1999)	Vol. 3 (2000)

Professional ratings
Review scores
Source	Rating
AllMusic	4/5 stars
Jesus Freak Hideout	3.5/5 stars

Happy Christmas Vol. 2 is a 1999 Christmas music compilation album, the second in a series released by BEC Records featuring artists from a variety of styles who were signed to BEC and its parent label, Tooth & Nail Records.

== Track listing ==
No.	Title	Artist	Length
1.	"Christmas Day"	MxPx	2:59
2.	"You're a Mean One, Mr. Grinch"	Sixpence None the Richer	3:05
3.	"I Wish It Could Be Christmas Everyday"	All Star United	4:23
4.	"Jesu Bambino (The Infant Child)"	Plankeye	3:57
5.	"O Little Town of Bethlehem"	Hangnail	1:37
6.	"Lollipop Parade (On Christmas Morn)"	Joy Electric	3:11
7.	"O Come All Ye Faithful"	Flight 180	3:09
8.	"Have Yourself a Merry Little Christmas"	Starflyer 59	3:11
9.	"God Rest Ye Merry, Gentlemen"	Viva Voce	2:08
10.	"Peace Child (O Come Emmanuel)"	The Normals	4:12
11.	"I Saw Mommy Kissing Santa Claus"	Fanmail	3:15
12.	"White Christmas"	Norway	2:53
13.	"Rockin' Around the Christmas Tree"	Element 101	1:43
14.	"Santa Claus Is Back in Town"	The Deluxtone Rockets	2:35
15.	"Caroling, Caroling"	House of Wires	2:20
16.	"The Chipmunk Song (Christmas Don't Be Late)"	Lost Dogs	4:52
Total length:			49:40
