= Ultrabeat (disambiguation) =

Ultrabeat is an English electronic music group. Ultrabeat may also refer to:

- Ultrabeat: The Album, the band's debut album
- Ultrabeat (Swedish band), a Christian electronic rock band
- Ultrabeat (netlabel), an early netlabel active in the 1990s
- Ultrabeat, a drumbeat program on Apple's Logic Pro
