= Happy Christmas Vol. 3 =

Compilation album by Various artists
- Released: 2001
- Genre: Holiday
- Length: 55:05
- Label: BEC

Happy Christmas series chronology
Vol. 2 (1999)	Vol. 3 (2001)	Vol. 4 (2005)

Professional ratings
Review scores
Source	Rating
Jesus Freak Hideout	3.5/5 stars

Happy Christmas Vol. 3 is a 2001 Christmas music compilation album, the third in a series released by BEC Records featuring artists from a variety of styles who were signed to BEC and its parent label, Tooth & Nail Records.

== Track listing ==
No.	Title	Artist	Length
1.	"Heaven's Got a Baby"	The O.C. Supertones
2.	"Santa Claus Is Thumbin to Town"	Relient K
3.	"The First Noel"	Cadet
4.	"What We Call Christmas"	Bleach
5.	"Wonderful Christmas Time"	Earthsuit
6.	"O Come, O Come Emmanuel"	Kendall Payne
7.	"Do You Hear What I Hear?"	Hangnail
8.	"What Child Is This?"	Poor Old Lu
9.	"Mrs Santa Claus"	Joy Electric
10.	"A Christmas Song"	Denison Witmer
11.	"Have It All"	Ace Troubleshooter
12.	"I'll Be Home for Christmas"	Starflyer 59
13.	"Rockin' Around the Christmas Tree"	Element 101
14.	"A Christmas Song for All Year Round"	Aaron Sprinkle
15.	"Christmas (Baby Please Come Home)"	Skyline Drive
16.	"I Hate Christmas Parties"	Matthew Thiessen and the Earthquakes
Total length:			55:05
