= Happy Christmas Vol. 4 =

Happy Christmas Volume 4

Compilation album by Various artists
- Released: October 25, 2005
- Genre: Holiday
- Length: 55:05
- Label: Tooth & Nail

Happy Christmas series chronology
Vol. 3 (2000)	Vol. 4 (2005)	Vol. 5 (2010)

Professional ratings
Review scores
Source	Rating
AllMusic	4/5 stars
Jesus Freak Hideout	4.5/5 stars

Happy Christmas Volume 4 is the fourth album in the Happy Christmas series started by BEC Records in 1998. It was released on October 25, 2005. This is the first one released by Tooth & Nail, BEC's mother label.

== Track listing ==
No.	Title	Artist(s)	Length
1.	"Evergreen"	Switchfoot	4:40
2.	"(Ho Ho Hey) A Way for Santa's Sleigh"	Emery	3:13
3.	"Christmas (Baby Please Come Home)"	Anberlin	2:49
4.	"The Winter Song"	Eisley	4:33
5.	"Christmas Time Is Here"	Starflyer 59	2:22
6.	"Yule Be Sorry"	Aaron Gillespie from Underoath and Kenny Vasoli from The Starting Line	4:18
7.	"Carol of the Bells"	Mae	3:51
8.	"Do You Hear What I Hear"	Copeland	3:31
9.	"I Celebrate the Day"	Relient K	3:09
10.	"Last Christmas"	Hawk Nelson	3:40
11.	"Mary Did You Know"	Spoken	3:27
12.	"O Holy Night"	The Fold	4:12
13.	"Of Two Bearded Men"	Number One Gun	5:24
14.	"God Is Alive (Jesus Is Real)"	John Davis	5:48

== Awards ==
In 2006, the album was nominated for a Dove Award for Special Event Album of the Year at the 37th GMA Dove Awards.
