= Start Right Here: Remembering the Life of Keith Green =

Studio album by Various artists
- Released: 2001
- Recorded: 2001
- Genre: Contemporary Christian music, Christian alternative rock
- Length: 71:54
- Label: BEC
- Producer: Derri Daugherty

Professional ratings
Review scores
| Source | Rating |
|---|---|
| Jesus Freak Hideout | 2.5/5 stars |
| The Phantom Tollbooth | Mixed |

Start Right Here: Remembering the Life of Keith Green is a compilation album by various artists paying tribute to deceased American contemporary Christian music musician Keith Green. It was released in 2000.

== Track listing ==
| No. | Title | performed by | Length |
|---|---|---|---|
| 1. | "Run to the End of the Highway" | Hangnail |
| 2. | "You Are the One" | Cadet |
| 3. | "Asleep in the Light" | Bleach |
| 4. | "Make My Life a Prayer to You" | Joy Electric |
| 5. | "You Put This Love in My Heart" | MxPx |
| 6. | "Lord I'm Gonna Love You" | Starflyer 59 |
| 7. | "Your Love Broke Through" | Ace Troubleshooter |
| 8. | "He'll Take Care of the Rest" | Flight 180 |
| 9. | "My Eyes Are Dry" | MG! The Visionary |
| 10. | "You!" | Element 101 |
| 11. | "40 Years" | Ill Harmonics |
| 12. | "Dear John Letter (to the Devil)" | The Dingees |
| Total length: | | | 71.54 |
