= Narcissus (band) =

American hardcore band

- Origin: Cleveland, Ohio, U.S.
- Genres: Metal; Hardcore punk; post hardcore
- Years active: 1998–2003, 2020–present
- Labels: Takehold, Century Media, Tooth & Nail
- Members: John LaRussa; John Pope; Josh King; Colin Simula
- Past members: Justin Carroll; Ray Taylor; Derek Carter; Bill Wensel; Stephen Cushman; Nick Brewer
- Website: Narcissus on Facebook

Narcissus was an American hardcore band formed by John LaRussa and John Pope in 1998 in Canton, Ohio. In addition to John Pope (vocals, keyboards) and John LaRussa (guitar), who were in the band from start to finish, members included, at various times, Justin Carroll (bass), Ray Taylor (rhythm guitar), Derek Carter (percussion), Bill Wensel (percussion), Stephen Cushman (percussion) and Josh King (bass). The band was on the now-defunct label Takehold Records before joining Century Media. A few albums were re-released through Tooth & Nail. Before breaking up the band were featured on The Vans Warped tour and were getting ready to hit Europe for their international release of Crave and Collapse, which was received well overseas. They announced that they have reunited and become a band again in 2020 after John Pope and John LaRussa were offered a spot on the famous Furnace Fest, performing on day 1, September 24, 2021, along with bands Converge, Glassjaw, Killswitch Engage, Everytime I Die and many others. They performed their first show on September 11, 2021.

The band has been considered highly influential for their progressive and inventive style of post hardcore, rock and metal. When the band broke up in 2003, John LaRussa went on to form Inhale Exhale with Brian Pittman, a former member of Relient K. John Pope joined Symphony In Peril briefly in 2003, and six months after he joined they disbanded. The band has toured with many bands including MewithoutYou, Silverstein, Underoath, Bayside, Further Seems Forever, Zao, Embodyment, Shelter, and , Few Left Standing, In 2020, the band reunited. In 2021 they headlined their first show back on September 11, 2021, and at the famous Furnace Fest on Day 1 on September 24, 2021. More shows are in works, along with new material that the band are working on.

== History ==
Narcissus began in 1998 with the lineup of John Pope on vocals, John LaRussa on guitars, Ray Taylor on guitars, Justin Carroll on bass, and Derek Carter on drums. Carroll and LaRussa had been a part of a band prior to Narcissus called Slow to Anger and Pope had also been in a band called Divine Division before, with both bands playing together which is how they met. Taylor and Carter joined on once the band was created. After being active for a brief time, Carter departed for a time with Bill Wensel taking over drums. With this lineup, the band recorded their debut EP, ...And Forthwith Came Out Blood and Water. The EP came out through Clenched Fist Records. After the EP was released, Carter rejoined the band on drums, with Wensel and Taylor both departing.

In 2000, the band signed with Takehold Records, a label operated out of Birmingham, Alabama by Chad Johnson, who sent the band up to Delaware, where they were set to record their debut album at Clay Creek Studios. With Nick Rotundo engineering the album, the band recorded and released their debut first full length album, Newwave Techno Homicide, which came out that year. After the album came out, the band embarked on the 40 Days of Disaster Tour alongside Tantrum of the Muse, Few Left Standing, and Underoath. Following the tour, Carter departed from the band. Carroll would also depart soon after Carter. Former Relient K drummer Stephen Cushman would take over the drum position and Josh King, former drummer of Vessel would take over bass duties. At the time of King's addition into the band, the band was finishing recording their sophomore album and EP, Becoming Leviathan on Take Hold Records.

After a long year of touring and performing for labels including a show at the legendary CBGBs in New York, The band decided to sign with Century Media Records and their subsidiary Abacus Records, which led to the band re-releasing Becoming Leviathan with three additional tracks. After the album's release the band would embark on a few brief tours with such bands as Further Seems Forever, Silverstein, Bayside, Me Without You, Shelter and playing shows alongside Converge, Brand New, Nora, Underoath and many more including numerous music festivals. In 2003, the band recorded and released their third album, Crave and Collapse, which came out through Century Media/Abacus and Sony Red World Wide. The band would then embark on a month long tour with Embodyment. They also Appeared on the 2003 Vans Warped Tour. After the album release, the band decided to disband do to differences and pursuing other endeavors in life.

After disbanding, each members went on to do their own thing with Pope joining Symphony in Peril and LaRussa going on to form Inhale Exhale. King would later start a new band called Not Beneath, with his best friend Danny Pelletier, formerly of Outcry and North Meadow Park, which released an album called Memento Mori.

== Members ==
Current

Members	Instruments	Years	Other projects
John Pope	vocals, keyboards	1998–2003, 2020–present	Divine Division, Symphony in Peril
John LaRussa	guitar	1998–2003, 2020–present	Oblivion, Slow to Anger, Inhale Exhale
Josh King	bass, (2001–2003, 2020–present) drums (2000-2001, 2003, 2020–2021)	2000-2001, 2001-2003, 2020-present	Vessel, Not Beneath
Colin Simula	drums	2023–present	Symphony in Peril, Maranatha

Former

- Ray Taylor – guitar (1998–1999)
- Justin Carroll – bass (1998–2000)
- Bill Wensel – drums (1998–1999)
- Derek Carter – drums (1998, 1999–2000)
- Stephen Cushman – drums (2000–2003)
- Nick Brewer – drums (2021-2023)

Timeline

== Discography ==
EPs

- ...And Forthwith Came Out Blood and Water (1999) (Clenched Fist Records)

Studio albums

- Newwave Techno Homicide (2000) (Take Hold Records/ Re-Released on Tooth and Nail)
- Becoming Leviathan (2001) (Take Hold Records);OCLC 50879339
- Crave and Collapse (2003) (Century Media)OCLC 240145430, 659123975

Compilations

- Narcissus (2002) (Becoming Leviathan + 3 added tracks) (Century Media)
