= Happy Christmas (compilation album) =

Compilation album by Various artists
- Released: October 20, 1998
- Genre: Holiday
- Length: 65:44
- Label: BEC

Happy Christmas series chronology
Happy Christmas (1998)	Vol. 2 (1999)

Happy Christmas is a 1998 Christmas music compilation album released by BEC Records featuring artists from a variety of styles who were signed to BEC and its parent label, Tooth & Nail Records, and its parent EMI Christian Music. While most songs are classic Christmas songs, some are original tunes. The album is the first in what would later become a series of releases.

Professional ratings
Review scores
Source	Rating
AllMusic	3/5 stars
HM Magazine	positive

== Track listing ==
No.	Title	Artist	Length
1.	"Joy to the World"	The O.C. Supertones	2:49
2.	"Winter Wonderland"	Joy Electric	2:22
3.	"O Come Emmanuel"	Chasing Furies	3:11
4.	"A Holiday Song"	Starflyer 59	2:08
5.	"You Gotta Get Up"	Five Iron Frenzy	2:29
6.	"Heaven's Got a Baby"	Sarah Masen	4:28
7.	"Away in a Manger"	Plankeye	3:16
8.	"God Rest Ye Merry Gentlemen"	Almonzo	2:30
9.	"Feliz Navidad"	Pep Squad	2:47
10.	"Holly Jolly Christmas"	Bon Voyage	2:37
11.	"O Holy Night"	Seven Day Jesus	5:28
12.	"Mele Kalikimaka"	Flight 180	2:36
13.	"Evergreen"	Switchfoot	4:44
14.	"Do You Hear What I Hear?"	House of Wires	4:16
15.	"Asia Minor"	Fold Zandura	4:06
16.	"It's Always Christmas at My House"	The Huntingtons	4:38
17.	"We Three Kings"	The Dingees	3:49
18.	"Savior of the Fools"	Puller	7:19
Total length:			65:33
