= Velour 100 =

American dream pop band

- Origin: Ypsilanti, Michigan, United States
- Genres: Dream pop Indie rock Shoegaze
- Years active: ca. 1995 - 2000
- Label: Tooth & Nail Records
- Members: Trey Many; Amon Krist; Jeremy Dybash; Matt Hudson; Rosie Thomas; Alicia Luma; Karin Oliver; Sydney Rentz; Tess Wiley

Velour 100 was a dream pop / ethereal rock band from Ypsilanti, Michigan, United States. The band existed from 1995 to 2000, with most of its music seeing release via Tooth & Nail Records in 1996 & 1997. The band was essentially masterminded by multi-instrumentalist Trey Many of His Name Is Alive and Liquorice. Warren Defever (also of His Name Is Alive) helped with production. The band's 4AD Records-influenced sound often led to comparisons to artists such as Cocteau Twins, Low, and Slowdive. AllMusic considered the style employed on later releases to be art rock. The band's lyrical aesthetic was rooted in Christianity.

Amon Krist was the vocalist on the group's 1995 cassette The Rainwater EP and their Tooth & Nail debut Fall Sounds. She also sang on Tooth & Nail's re-release of their debut cassette on CD, called Songs from the Rainwater EP, after which point she left the group. The second album Of Color Bright used three new vocalists: Tess Wiley of Sixpence None the Richer, Sydney Rentz of Morella's Forest and Karin Oliver, also of His Name Is Alive.

The band then went on hiatus. They self-released an EP in 1999 featuring Rosie Thomas and Trey Many on vocals. The band played a few more shows and short tours until their last appearance at The Blind Pig in Ann Arbor on October 16, 2000.

== Discography ==
=== Albums ===
- Fall Sounds (1996, Tooth & Nail)
- Of Color Bright (1997, Tooth & Nail)

=== EPs ===
- The Rainwater EP (1995, self-released cassette)
- Songs From The Rainwater EP (1997, Tooth & Nail)
- For An Open Sky (1999, self-released)
