= Few Left Standing =

American Christian metal band

- Also known as: Fewleftstanding
- Origin: Memphis, Tennessee, U.S.
- Genres: Christian hardcore, hardcore punk, Christian metal
- Years active: 1998–2002, 2019–present
- Labels: Tree of Woe, Takehold, Solid State
- Members: Chris Stafford; Aaron Winter; Jon Keegin; Jason Lancaster; Paul Doherty
- Past members: Jim Joblin

Few Left Standing is a Christian metal band that primarily played Christian hardcore and was signed to Takehold Records. The band's debut album was produced by Living Sacrifice frontman, Bruce Fitzhugh. The band has toured with Underoath, Narcissus, and Tantrum of the Muse. On December 3, 2019, it was announced that the band would be returning to perform at Furnace Fest 2020, alongside a recently reunited Beloved.

== History ==
Few Left Standing started in 1998 as a hardcore punk band. Previously, the members had formed a band called Broken with the lineup of Jim Joblin on rhythm guitars, Chris Stafford on bass, Jason Lancaster on lead guitars, Jon Keegin on drums, and a friend named Joey on vocals. However, the band did not last long, which led to their disbanding. Around a month later, Lancaster and Keegin spoke to Stafford and informed him that their friend Aaron Winters would play bass, which led to Stafford to try out vocals.

The band signed to Takehold Records in 1999. In 1999 the band recorded their debut album, Regeneration of Self. The album was produced by the famed Living Sacrifice vocalist and rhythm guitarist Bruce Fitzhugh.

The band released an EP in 2000 to an independent record label called Tree of Woe. In mid-2000, the band was booked for the "40 Days of Disaster" tour with Underoath, Narcissus and Tantrum of the Muse.

In 2001 the band recorded their second album, Wormwood, that was released on Takehold as well. In 2002 the band disbanded. In 2003, Takehold Records was bought out by Tooth & Nail Records and Takehold's catalog was added to the Tooth & Nail Records discography. The albums were reissued on Solid State Records, an imprint of Tooth & Nail.

On December 3, 2019, it was announced the band would reunite to play Furnace Fest over the weekend of September 18–20, 2020.

== Members ==
Current

- Chris Stafford – vocals (1998–2002, 2019–present)
- Aaron Winter – bass guitar (1998–2002, 2019–present)
- Jon Keegin – drums (1998–2002, 2019–present)
- Jason Lancaster – lead guitar (1998–2002, 2019–present)
- Jim Joblin – rhythm guitar (1998, 2021)

== Discography ==
Studio albums

- Regeneration of Self (1999; Takehold)
- Wormwood (2001; Takehold)

EPs

- The Exit Wound (2000; Tree of Woe)
