= Far-Less discography =

The band Far-Less has released three EPs and three full-length studio albums. They recorded a fourth EP "The Headache" in 2008 that was never officially released.

- Emerge (2001) – self-released
- Apossibility (2002) – self-released

== Broken Hearts Unite ==
Broken Hearts Unite

Studio album by Far-Less
- Released: July 15, 2003
- Recorded: The Basement; Winston Salem, NC
- Genre: Alternative rock
- Length: 40:16
- Label: Silent Uproar
- Producer: Jamie King

Far-Less chronology
Apossibility (2002)	Broken Hearts Unite (2003)	Turn to the Bright (2004)

=== Track listing ===
No.	Title	Length
1.	"A Virus On My Mind"	4:52
2.	"Ignorance Is Bliss"	3:58
3.	"Alibi"	4:08
4.	"Mike Lowrey"	3:26
5.	"Fallacy"	3:25
6.	"Interlude (Point Of Rebirth)"	2:15
7.	"Broken Hearts Unite"	4:26
8.	"Your Antidote"	4:10
9.	"Juliet"	4:52
10.	"Horomones And Peer Pressure"	4:44

=== Personnel ===
Brandon Welch – vocals
Jordan Powers –guitar
Mark Karsten – guitar
Joseph Powers – bass
Ray Felts – drums

Halo 13 – artwork
Jamie King – engineering, production
Jamie King – mixing

== Turn to the Bright (EP) ==
Turn to the Bright

EP by Far-Less
- Released: November 16, 2004
- Recorded: The Basement; Winston Salem, NC
- Genre: Post-hardcore
- Length: 20:47
- Label: Tooth & Nail
- Producer: Jamie King

Far-Less chronology
Broken Hearts Unite (2003)	Turn to the Bright (2004)	Everyone Is Out to Get Us (2006)

Professional ratings
Review scores
Source	Rating
AllMusic	3.5/5 stars

=== Track listing ===
No.	Title	Length
1.	"Intro"	2:05
2.	"Scorched Earth Policy"	4:09
3.	"Georgia"	4:37
4.	"The Mountain Song"	3:43
5.	"Out of Balance (Koyaanisqatsi)"	3:47
6.	"Outro"	2:26

=== Personnel ===
Brandon Welch – vocals
Jordan Powers – guitar
Mark Karsten – guitar
Joseph Powers – bass
Ray Felts – drums

Asterik Studio – artwork
Jamie King – engineering/production
Jamie King – mixing
Coiln Patrick Day – photography

== Everyone Is Out to Get Us ==
Everyone is Out to Get Us

Studio album by Far-Less
- Released: February 7, 2006
- Recorded: Dynasonic Studios; Atlanta, GA
- Genres: Alternative rock, post-hardcore
- Length: 42:22
- Label: Tooth & Nail
- Producer: Lee March

Far-Less chronology
Turn to the Bright (2004)	Everyone is Out to Get Us (2006)	A Toast to Bad Taste (2007)

Professional ratings
Review scores
Source	Rating
Allmusic	3.5/5 stars

=== Track listing ===
No.	Title	Length
1.	"You Knew What This Was"	3:27
2.	"Dialogue Supervisor (Rise of the Pop Icon)"	3:39
3.	"Jumping the Shark"	2:32
4.	"It Gets Complicated"	3:50
5.	"Garage Band Degree (Everyone Else Is Doing It, Why Aren't You?)"	3:49
6.	"Walk Between the Raindrops"	2:09
7.	"I Looked at the Trap, Ray"	4:04
8.	"Too Pretty (To Be a Zombie)"	3:49
9.	"Roswell That Ends Well"	4:00
10.	"Everyone Is Out to Get Us"	3:56
11.	"Semper"	7:07

=== Personnel ===
Brandon Welch – vocals
Jordan Powers – guitar
Mark Karsten – guitar/piano
Joseph Powers – bass
Ray Felts – drums

Asterik Studio – artwork
Mastin Simmons – assistant engineer
Andy Riley – engineer
Lee March, Andy Riley – mixing
Lee March – producer
Mastin Simmons – programming Jared Draughn (of Classic Case/Must Be The Holy Ghost) – guest vocals on "Roswell That Ends Well"

Inspired by [adult swim], Coast to Coast a.m, conspiracy documentaries, crop circles, and U.F.O sightings. Everyone is Out to Get Us is a concept album. The story of a young rock group on tour during the "Quickening" or the "Apocalypse". The album consists of two story lines that, at times exist within the same song. One story follows the band on tour and the insanity that they witness and the other follows a Govt. Whistleblower being hunted down by "The Powers That Be".

== A Toast to Bad Taste ==
A Toast to Bad Taste

Studio album by Far-Less
- Released: October 23, 2007
- Recorded: Los Angeles, CA
- Genre: Alternative rock
- Length: 50:37
- Label: Tooth & Nail
- Producer: Mike Green

Far-Less chronology
Everyone Is Out to Get Us (2006)	A Toast to Bad Taste (2007)

Professional ratings
Review scores
Source	Rating
Absolutepunk.net	(79%)
Allmusic	3.5/5 stars

=== Track listing ===
No.	Title	Length
1.	"Intro"	0:22
2.	"A Toast to Bad Taste"	3:50
3.	"I Hope We Swim (Oceans)"	4:27
4.	"A Thin Line"	3:27
5.	"Segue to Devil Without a Clue"	0:32
6.	"Devil Without a Clue"	4:15
7.	"It's Not Me, It's You"	3:31
8.	"Segue to Gentlemen (Go to Sleep)"	0:53
9.	"Gentlemen (Go to Sleep)"	4:18
10.	"Keep Keep"	3:25
11.	"Segue to So Glad"	1:22
12.	"So Glad"	3:57
13.	"Surprise Funeral (For the Charmed)"	5:03
14.	"To Live"	3:21
15.	"Forever and a Day"	3:05
16.	"I Gave In"	4:54

=== Personnel ===
Brandon Welch – vocals, guitar
Jordan Powers – guitar, vocals
Mark Karsten – guitar, vocals
Joseph Powers – bass, vocals
Todd Turner – drums, vocals
Elizabeth "Bitsy" Pina – piano, synthesizer

Mike Green – producer
Josh King (from House of Fools) – guest vocals on "Forever and a Day" & "I Gave In"
Asha Mevlana – violin on "Gentlemen (Go to Sleep)" & "Forever and a Day"

=== Music video ===
A music video was also produced for the song "A Toast to Bad Taste".

- The Headache EP Never released
