= Mike Mains & The Branches =

Rock indie band

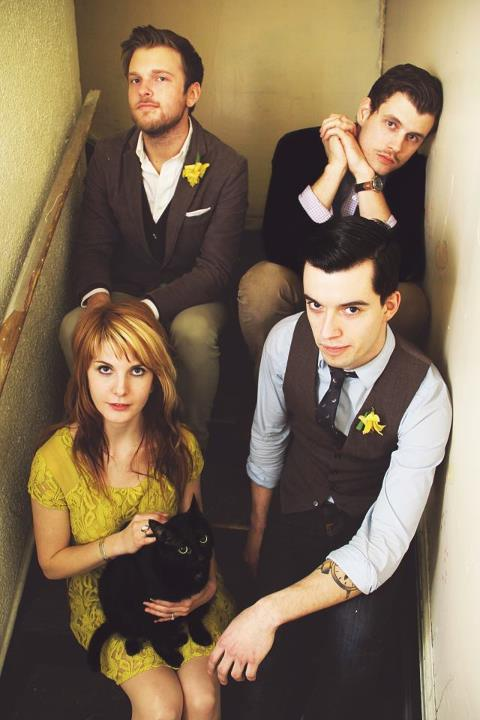
- Mike Mains & The Branches with a cat (David McGuire)

Background information
- Origin: Gainesville, Texas/Owosso, Michigan
- Genres: Indie rock
- Years active: 2009–present
- Labels: Tooth & Nail Records
- Members: Mike Mains; Shannon Mains; Alex Hirlinger; Robbie Barnett; Allison Barnett
- Past members: Jacob Burkhart; David Denison; Nate Wethy; David McGuire
- Website: http://mikemainsmusic.com/

Mike Mains & The Branches is an American indie rock band, based in Michigan. It consists mainly of Mike and Shannon Mains, with newest members Alex Hirlinger, Robbie Barnett, and Allison Barnett. They first made their way into the national spotlight after the release of their debut album, Home, in 2010. The band's music is most readily identified by their use of pop melodies in contrast with singer Mains' often aggressive vocal style.

== History ==
Mike Mains & The Branches formed in 2009 in Gainesville, Texas by Mike Mains and David Denison. The two were soon joined by Jacob Burkhart and Mains' future wife, Shannon Briggs. After determining to pursue music full-time, the band relocated to Mike and Shannon's home state of Michigan.

Their debut album, Home, was produced by Tyler Orr and mixed by Matt Malpass. The album was released independently on June 5, 2012. After touring consistently for over a year in support of their debut, Mike Mains & The Branches signed to Platinum Pop Music. After Platinum went under, the band remained independent as they worked on new material.

The band has become known for their energetic live performances. In 2012, they played the Main Stage at the final year of Cornerstone Music Festival, and post-event coverage named the band as the "Best Show" of the festival.

In the spring of 2013, the band launched a successful crowdfunding campaign through PledgeMusic and began recording new material for a follow-up album. The first of the new songs were released on the Everything EP, just before the start of a Fall Tour with The Orphan, The Poet & The American Opera. On February 18, 2014, the band released their finished sophomore album, Calm Down, Everything Is Fine, co-produced by Matt Hoopes of Relient K. The album also featured Zac Farro of Paramore on drums.

In August 2018, the band announced that they had signed with Tooth & Nail Records., and launched another successful crowdfunding campaign to help fund their third studio album, When We Were in Love. The album was produced by Nathan Horst and was released on April 5, 2019.

== Reception ==
Mike Mains & The Branches's debut album, Home, was initially released without notable critical response. However, the successful release of a music video for the song "Stereo" garnered some attention and a number of positive reviews. Most coverage of the album followed the rerelease in June 2012. TVU's music countdown show, Ten Most Wanted, named it the "Most Wanted" video of 2011.

Their sophomore album, Calm Down, Everything Is Fine release was met with much excitement. Many reviewers noted the unique style & "It" factor Mike Mains & the Branches portrayed in their new music. “Noises” attracted attention for its "gritty, rock edge", while "Slow Down" brought a whole different, "calm, folk-like" side of Mike Mains to the table. The entire album portrays many different styles of music, but are all done masterfully showing the true talent and skill of the band.

On Spotify, the band has grown quite popular. Currently, the band has over 100,000 monthly listeners Spotify. For their previous album, they did multiple interviews with magazines and websites. Almost all of the band's albums are on the site or app except for The Rustic EP, which came out in 2009.

== Personnel ==
While Mike Mains & The Branches' line-up initially consisted of frontman Mains playing guitar, David Denison on drums, Shannon Mains (Briggs) on keys, and Jacob Burkhart on bass; Burkhart would leave the group in April 2011, with Denison leaving a year later. Nate Wethy, who started as an interim touring bassist, would eventually come to fill the role of a full member for four years, leaving in 2015. Josh Smith, a music producer from Lansing, Michigan is credited with the production of the band's first EP, and is also listed as playing lead guitar on Home. The void of drummer, guitarist, and bassist is one that was filled by various touring members. However, Now there is a full-time drummer, bassist, and guitarist for the band in addition to a lead singer and keyboardist. Currently, the band members and their roles are:

- Mike Mains (guitar and lead vocals)
- Shannon Mains (vocals, guitar, keys, mandolin and saxophone)
- Alex Hirlinger (guitar and vocals)
- Robbie Barnett (drummer)
- Allison Barnett. (bass and vocals).

== Mike Mains solo project discography ==
The main singer and guitarist, Mike Mains, went solo for a year in 2017 and came out with a Christmas EP and a single called "My Way". The albums that were produced by him are independently produced.

Albums

- Christmas Magic

Singles

- "My Way"

Christmas Magic
No.	Title	Length
1	Merry Christmas, Baby	3.00
2	O Come, O Come, Emmanuel	3.00
3	Christmas Magic	4.23
4	Happy Holidays, My Dear	3.19
5	Jingle Bells	2.16

My Way
No.	title	Length
1	My Way	3.15

== Discography ==
Over the past ten years, the band has released three albums, two EPs and three singles. One album that can not be found for sale is The Rustic EP. However, three of the four songs on the album can be listened to on YouTube.

=== Studio albums ===
List of Studio Albums
Title	Details
Home	Released: June 5, 2012 Label: Mike Mains & the Branches Format: digital download
Calm Down, Everything is Fine	Released: February 18, 2014 Label: Mike Mains & the Branches Format: digital download
When We Were in Love	Released: April 5, 2019 Label: Tooth & Nail Records Formats: CD, digital download, LP
Memory Unfixed	Released: September 15, 2023 Label: Tooth & Nail Records Formats: CD, digital download, LP

=== EPs ===
- The Rustic - EP (2009)
- Everything - EP (2013)

=== Singles ===
List of Singles
Title	Year	Album
Endless Summer	2018	When We Were in Love
Breathing Underwater	2018	When We Were in Love
Live Forever	2019	When We Were in Love
Around the Corner	2019	When We Were in Love
Gonna Get Through This	2020	non-album single

The Rustic EP (2009)
No.	Title	Length
1	Stampede	
2	Something Beautiful	
3	Not By Power	
4	We're All The Same	

Home (2012)
No.	title	length
1	Miracle	3.34
2	Stereo	3.28
3	Lady Love	3.24
4	Rush you	3.53
5	Beneath Water	4.27
6	Emma Ruth	4.55
7	Life	3.50
8	Drifter	4.28
9	Love	2.50
10	Free	3.33
11	Stop The Car	3.17
12	Matches	4.49

Calm Down, Everything Is Fine (2014)
No.	Title	Length
1	Played It Safe	1.35
2	Everything Is Gonna Be Alright	2.41
3	By My Side	3.42
4	Noises	2.55
5	Slow Down	3.08
6	Take It All	3.30
7	In The Night	3.15
8	Where Love Dies	3.21
9	Burn	3.57
10	Stones	4.38
11	Calm Down, Everything Is Fine	5.15

When We Were In Love (2019)
No.	Title	Length
1	Pouring Rain	3.19
2	Live Forever	3.25
3	Endless Summer	3.38
4	Holy Ghost	3.27
5	Around The Corner	3.55
6	Breathing Underwater	3.30
7	Only Thing I Need	3.48
8	Fever	3.04
9	Renegades	4.33
10	Back To Your Heart	4.03
11	Swamp	4.10

== When We Were In Love ==
In October, 2018, Mike Mains And The Branches came out with a new single "Endless Summer". This song was going to be put on their new album When We Were In Love. In November 2018, they released another single from the upcoming album called "Breathing Underwater". These singles began to become popular and were spreading around on social media. They also came out with an EP of 4 songs from the album on March 22. One of those songs was "Around the Corner". The singer says that this song is about his struggle with depression. They proceeded to come out with new singles until April 5, 2019, when they released their new album. According to the band, the album is about the struggles in Mike and Shannon's marriage. The songs go through the two member's relationship throughout their marriage. The band interviewed with Talk Nerdy With Us and said that the album took close to three years to make from start to finish.

The album, When We Were In Love, was released five years after their previous album, Calm Down, Everything Is Fine, which was released in 2014. According to an interview with Vents magazine, the band stated the reason that they did not come out with new music between those five years was due to time and resources.
