= Sing It Now =

EP by Poema
- Released: March 23, 2010
- Recorded: 2009
- Genre: Pop, CCM, acoustic
- Length: 22:39
- Label: Tooth & Nail
- Producer: Aaron Sprinkle

Poema chronology
Sing It Now (2010)	Once a Year: A Poema Christmas EP (2010)

Professional ratings
Review scores
Source	Rating
Christian Music Zine	3.5/5 stars
Indie Vision Music	7/10 stars
Jesus Freak Hideout	3.5/5 stars
New Release Tuesday	4/5 stars

Sing It Now is an EP by the acoustic pop duo, Poema. It is the debut EP by the group to be released on Tooth & Nail Records.

== Track listing ==
No.	Title	Length
1.	"2 AM"	3:23
2.	"City Boy"	3:26
3.	"Feel the Same Way"	3:34
4.	"Echo off the Sky"	3:59
5.	"Safe to Say"	3:37
6.	"Blue Sweater"	4:43

== Music videos ==
- "2 AM"

== Personnel ==
- Elle Puckett - lead vocals, guitar
- Shealeen Puckett - backing vocals, keyboards
