= Happy Christmas Vol. 5 =

Happy Christmas Volume 5

Compilation album by Various artists
- Released: September 28, 2010
- Genre: Holiday
- Length: 47:25
- Label: Tooth & Nail

Happy Christmas series chronology
Vol. 4 (2005)	Vol. 5 (2010)

Professional ratings
Review scores
Source	Rating
AllMusic	2.5/5 stars
Jesus Freak Hideout	4/5 stars

Happy Christmas Vol. 5 is the fifth album in the Happy Christmas series started by BEC Records in 1998.

== Track listing ==
No.	Title	Artist	Length
1.	"The Chipmunk Song (Christmas Don't Be Late)"	Hawk Nelson	2:00
2.	"The Wind"	Demon Hunter	4:02
3.	"O, Holy Night"	Ivoryline	4:05
4.	"Heat Miser"	Thousand Foot Krutch	2:47
5.	"O Come, O Come Emmanuel"	August Burns Red	4:57
6.	"Jesus Gave Us Christmas"	Emery	3:12
7.	"It's Christmas Day" (from Family Force 5's Christmas Pageant)	Family Force 5	3:57
8.	"The Little Christmas Tree"	Bon Voyage	2:28
9.	"Happy Xmas (War Is Over)"	Sent by Ravens	4:29
10.	"You're a Mean One, Mr. Grinch"	Queens Club	3:35
11.	"Zat U Santa Claus"	Neon Horse	2:45
12.	"Snow Miser"	FM Static	1:51
13.	"Rockin' Around the Christmas Tree"	Surrogate	3:14
14.	"Have Yourself a Merry Little Christmas"	Copeland	4:03
Total length:			47:25
