= Poema (musical group) =

- Origin: Albuquerque, New Mexico, US
- Genres: Acoustic singer-songwriter
- Years active: 2008–present
- Labels: Tooth & Nail
- Members: Elle Puckett; Shealeen Puckett
- Website: poemamusic.com

Poema is an American acoustic singer-songwriter duo from Albuquerque, New Mexico. The group was formerly signed with Tooth & Nail Records and has released two EPs and a full-length album with them.

== History ==
Elle and Shealeen Puckett, sisters born and raised in the American Southwest, comprise the band Poema. The female duo has been playing music ever since they can remember. At ten and twelve, the equal and opposites would walk to the local gas station to play Elvis covers for anyone filling up that day until they made enough money to buy candy. They were surrounded by music their entire lives, starting with their parents being in bands to playing music since pre-adolescence. The sisters never planned to be professional musicians until an extremely positive reception following a benefit show in 2008 in their hometown of Albuquerque, New Mexico. After pondering shortly after the show, the sisters formed Poema, won a "Battle of the Bands" competition and recorded two demos.

In 2009, Poema signed to Tooth & Nail Records. At the time, Elle and Shealeen Puckett were 17 and 19, respectively. The record deal came as a result of a personal call from Brandon Ebel, founder and president of Tooth & Nail Records. The call followed a demo play from a representative whose attention had been caught by one of Poema's performances. Aaron Sprinkle worked with Poema on several projects. In 2014, they announced their separation from Tooth & Nail Records to become an independent band.

In 2010, Poema was featured on every date of the Warped Tour in the Girlz Garage.

== Members ==
- Elle Puckett – lead vocals, guitar
- Shealeen Puckett – backing vocals, keys

== Discography ==
=== Studio EPs ===
Released	Title	Label(s)
March 23, 2010	Sing It Now	Tooth & Nail Records
November 16, 2010	Once a Year: A Poema Christmas EP	Tooth & Nail Records
September 11, 2012	Remembering You	Tooth & Nail Records
July 10, 2015	Pretty Speeches	Independent release
