= Telos (Forevermore album) =

Studio album by Forevermore
- Released: July 22, 2014
- Genres: Christian hardcore, progressive metalcore, djent
- Length: 36:24
- Label: Solid State
- Producer: Jordan Furr

Telos is the third studio album from American metalcore band Forevermore. Solid State Records released the project on July 22, 2014. Forevermore worked with Jordan Furr on the production of this album.

== Reception ==
Professional ratings
Review scores
Source	Rating
CCM Magazine	3/5 stars
HM Magazine	3/5 stars
Indie Vision Music	4/5 stars
Jesus Freak Hideout	4/5 stars
Jesus Wired	7.5/10 stars

Specifying in a three star review by HM Magazine, Nate Lake regards, "Telos is mixed very well, providing a crisp sound that stands out in a scene of generic metalcore acts." Matt Conner, indicating in a three star review from CCM Magazine, recognizing, "Forevermore, Solid State’s newest signing, is going for 'interesting and enjoyable' on their new album, Telos." Signaling in a four star review from Jesus Freak Hideout, Michael Weaver responds, "Forevermore have a lot to offer metal fans in Telos. It's certainly not the greatest metal album I've heard and it's not even the greatest debut I've heard, but it is a really, really solid release... Forevermore have some stout competition by releasing their album the same day as metalcore stalwarts War of Ages' stellar release, Supreme Chaos, but Telos can definitely compete." Brody B., writes in a four star review from Indie Vision Music, replying, "Forevermore have crafted an enjoyable and incredibly solid debut record filled with tracks that show immense potential." Awarding the album seven and a half stars for Jesus Wired, Topher P. writes, "For the most part the flow is a good thing; however there are times when the continuity grows tiresome, and everything seems to be a little monotonous."

== Track listing ==
All tracks are written by Forevermore.

No.	Title	Length
1.	"Force Fed"	3:42
2.	"The Great Divine"	3:15
3.	"Wormtongue"	3:55
4.	"Transcendence"	3:18
5.	"Lackluster"	3:09
6.	"State of Gold"	3:48
7.	"Bitter Years"	3:47
8.	"Paper World"	4:02
9.	"The Wager"	3:41
10.	"Harbor Lights"	3:47
Total length:		36:24

== Charts ==
Chart (2014)	Peak position
US Top Christian Albums (Billboard)	43
US Heatseekers Albums (Billboard)	37
