= A Dream Too Late =

- Origin: Albany, Oregon, United States
- Genres: Alternative-rock, Emo, Experimental-rock,Christian Rock, Screamo, Post-hardcore
- Years active: 2005-2011, 2017–present
- Label: Tooth & Nail
- Members: Original Members: Reid MacKenzie (vocals); Garrett Pifer (keys/Bassist/Screamer); Kody Roth (guitar); Jordan Wood (drums) Chris Eddie (guitar) Past Members: Nate Smith (guitar/vocals); Brandon Queen (drums); Zach Valette Tyler Porter (bass)
- Website: adreamtoolatemusic.com

A Dream Too Late was an alternative rock band from Albany, Oregon, United States. The group was signed to Tooth & Nail Records.

They released their debut album, Intermission to the Moon on November 6, 2007. In 2007 they also toured with Falling Up, Run Kid Run, The Send, and Ruth. Reviewers compared the group's sound to Falling Up and Shiny Toy Guns.

In 2008 they were let go by Tooth & Nail Records. The band recently on their MySpace that they have broken up and that previous members have created a new band called "Philadelphia". The Philadelphia project was active up until February 2011 releasing only one song.

== Discography ==
Intermission to the Moon

1. 14th and Knott
2. Do You Believe? (In Ghosts)
3. Intermission to the Moon
4. Trendsetter
5. The Life
6. City Park
7. Be Honest
8. Can I Start A New
9. Daylight
10. Airsick
11. A Night Polaris

Archives 2005 Single 1 Motive 2 Bury it 3 Boo Radley
