= Forevermore (band) =

American metalcore band

- Origin: Indianapolis, Indiana, U.S.
- Genres: Metalcore; Christian hardcore; post-hardcore; djent; progressive metal
- Years active: 2009–2018
- Label: Solid State
- Members: Kramer Lowe; Jared Storm; Alex Smith; Michael Taylor; Sammy Vaughn
- Past members: Jordan Furr; Derek Belser

Forevermore is an American metalcore band from Indianapolis, Indiana, formed in 2009. They are signed to Solid State Records and Telos is their first work on the label.

== Members ==
Current

- Kramer Lowe – vocals (ex-Onward to Olympas, ex-Caught in Line of Fire) (2014–present)
- Jared Storm – guitar (ex-The Onset) (2009–present)
- Alex Smith – guitar (ex-The Onset) (2009–present)
- Michael Taylor – bass (ex-Wings of a Martyr) (2012-present)
- Sammy Vaughn – drums (2009–present)

Former

- Jordan Furr – vocals (2009 - 2013)
- Derek Belser – bass

== Discography ==
Studio albums

List of studio albums, with selected chart positions
Title	Album details	Peak chart positions	
Title	Album details	US Christ	US Heat
Moths and Rust	Released: June 3, 2010; Label: Independent; Format: CD, Digital download		
Sojourner	Released: December 15, 2012; Label: Independent; Format: CD, digital download		
Telos	Released: July 22, 2014; Label: Solid State Records; Format: CD, digital download	43	37
Integral	Released: July 22, 2016; Label: Solid State Records; Format: CD, digital download	12	8

EPs

- In the End (2010, Independent)
