= Earth Groans =

American metalcore band

- Origin: South Dakota
- Genres: Metalcore, hardcore punk
- Years active: 2015–present
- Label: Solid State
- Members: Jeremy Schaeffer
- Past members: Zachariah Mayfield; Kaden Burton; Brady Mueller
- Website: earthgroansmusic.com

Earth Groans is a metalcore band that formed in May 2015. The band is from South Dakota.

== History ==
The band formed in May 2015, in South Dakota. The band formed because of vocalist Jeremy Schaeffer, who felt called to ministry. A week after this feeling, he formed the band with guitarist Zachariah Mayfield, bassist Kaden Burton and drummer Brady Mueller. The band's name came from Romans 8:23. Two years after formation, they signed to Solid State Records. The band has been touring relentlessly, many times by themselves. Soon after signing, the band released Renovate on May 12. The band recently embarked on a tour with Convictions, with Darkness Divided taking the second half, replacing the band. In 2018, Rahab was released. In 2020, the band released their third EP, Prettiest of Things. On March 19, 2020, both Mayfield and Burton announced their departure from the band. On March 3, 2023, the band released their fourth EP, Tongue Tied.

== Style ==
The band has been stated to sound similar to many of the influential Christian hardcore and Christian metalcore acts such as Norma Jean and The Chariot.

== Members ==
Current

- Jeremy Schaeffer – vocals (2015–present), guitars (2020–present), bass (2020–2021)

Live

- Dakota Testa – guitar (2021–present)
- Nick Pocock – bass (2021–2022)
- Elijah Shoffner – bass (2022–present) (Deathbreaker)
- Blaise Turcato – drums (2021) (Sorry, No Sympathy)
- Isaiah Perez – drums (2021–2022) (ex-Spoken, Phinehas, Love and Death)
- Derek Ludgate – drums (2022–present)

Former

- Zachariah Mayfield – guitars (2015–2020)
- Kaden Burton – bass (2015–2020)
- Brady Mueller – drums (2015–2021)

Timeline

== Discography ==
EPs

- Renovate (2017; Solid State Records)
- Rahab (2018; Solid State Records)
- Prettiest of Things (2020; Solid State Records)
- Waste (2020; Solid State Records)
- The Body (2021; Solid State Records)
- Tongue Tied (2023; Solid State Records)

=== Singles ===
- Avarice (2018)
- Heathen Heart (2018)
- Reign (2018)
- Allure (2018)
- Springs (2020)
- Shatter (2020)
- Ghost (2020)
- My Own Summer (Shove It) (2021)
- Drink (2021)
- Wake The Dead (2022)
- Overgrown (2023)
- Chasm (2024)
- Deadbolt (2024)

Music videos

- "Driving Out" (2017)
- "The Estate" (2017)
- "Avarice" (2018)
- "Springs" (2020)
- "Silk" (2020)
- "Drink" (2021)
- "Overgrown" (2023)
