= Once a Year: A Poema Christmas EP =

Once A Year: A Poema Christmas EP

EP by Poema
- Released: November 16, 2010
- Recorded: 2010
- Genre: Christian, acoustic, pop
- Length: 18:57
- Label: Tooth & Nail

Poema chronology
Sing It Now EP (2010)	Once A Year: A Poema Christmas EP (2010)

Professional ratings
Review scores
Source	Rating
Jesus Freak Hideout	3/5 stars
New Release Tuesday	4/5 stars

Once a Year: A Poema Christmas EP is a holiday EP by American acoustic pop duo, Poema. It is the second EP released by the group on Tooth & Nail Records.

== Track listing ==
No.	Title	Length
1.	"Have Yourself a Merry Little Christmas"	3:43
2.	"Wool Coats"	4:31
3.	"Santa Will Find You"	3:21
4.	"So Much More"	3:56
5.	"Little Drummer Boy"	3:28

== Personnel ==
- Elle Puckett - lead vocals, guitar
- Shealeen Puckett - backing vocals, keyboards
