= I Am Empire =

American rock band

- Origin: San Jose, California, United States
- Genres: Alternative rock; post-hardcore; emo; pop punk
- Years active: 2008-present
- Labels: Tooth & Nail
- Members: Austin Lyons; Joshua Case
- Past members: Eric Martin; Dan Otis; Andrew Stanton
- Website: www.myspace.com/iamempire

I Am Empire is an American rock band from San Jose, California. Formed in 2008, the band currently consists of Austin Lyons (lead vocals) and Joshua Case (bass and vocals). The band's first label release, Kings, was released by Tooth & Nail Records on January 25, 2011 and has since made Billboard's Top Christian Albums and Top Heatseekers charts.

== History ==
The band originally went by the name Vespera, but after unsuccessful touring, two member departures, and legal threats from another band with the same name, they took the name I Am Empire in August 2008. Following the name change, the band independently released a self-titled album, I Am Empire, in April 2009. While the album itself did not chart, its two singles, "You're A Fake" and "The Elevator", peaked at No. 15 and No. 11 on Billboard/R&R's Christian Rock chart. They toured through the remainder of 2009 and toured in 2010 including an appearance at SXSW. Features on AOL.com, KingsofA&R, and Myspace Music, garnered the attention of Tooth & Nail Records.

The band was signed to Tooth & Nail Records in May 2010, on which they released their second album, Kings, on January 25, 2011. It went on to make Billboard's Top Christian Albums and Top Heatseekers charts, peaking at No. 35 and No. 40 respectively.

In support of Kings, I Am Empire has toured with Emery, Brian "Head" Welch, Project 86, The Letter Black, Icon for Hire and Children 18:3, as well as headlining the "Kings and Queens Tour" with support from Nine Lashes and Blood and Water. In December 2011, I Am Empire performed at Christmas Rock Night 2011 in Ennepetal, Germany.

On June 7, 2012, drummer Eric Martin officially announced via a blog post on Tooth & Nail's website that the band was recording their second album with producer Brian McTernan at his Salad Days Studio in Baltimore, Maryland. The new album, Anchors was released on March 26, 2013. Andrew Stanton, the lead guitarist, left I Am Empire to play with the band Disciple. Eric Martin, the band's drummer, left in 2013 to play with the band Talkie.

In 2020, I Am Empire released an EP, Another Man's Treasure, recorded during the Anchors sessions but never before released, featuring three new songs, "Airwaves", "Clever Nightmare", and "On a Rainy Sunday", as well as acoustic renditions of "You're a Fake" and "Foxhole".

== Band members ==
Current

- Austin Lyons (2008–present) - lead vocals
- Joshua Case (2008—present) - bass guitar, backing vocals

Former

- Eric Martin (Talkie)(2008–2013) - drums
- Dan Otis (2008–2011) - guitar
- Andrew Stanton (Disciple)(2008–2013) - guitar

== Discography ==
Albums

| Year | Title | Label | Chart positions | |
| Year | Title | Label | US Christ. | US Heat. |
|---|---|---|---|---|
| 2009 | I Am Empire | Independent | — | — |
| 2011 | Kings | Tooth & Nail Records | 35 | 40 |
| 2013 | Anchors | Tooth & Nail Records | — | — |

EPs

| Year | Title | Label |
|---|---|---|
| 2020 | Another Man's Treasure | Tooth & Nail Records |

Singles

| Year | Title | Chart Peak | Album |
| Year | Title | Christian Rock | Album |
|---|---|---|---|
| 2009 | "You're a Fake" | 15 | I Am Empire |
| 2009 | "The Elevator" | 11 | I Am Empire |
| 2010 | "Brain Damage" | 1 | Kings |
| 2011 | "Hammers & Anvils" | 8 | Kings |
| 2011 | "Saints & Sinners" | 1 | Kings |

Music Videos

| Year | Song | Director |
|---|---|---|
| 2009 | "You're a Fake" | Peter Lindsey |
| 2009 | "The Elevator" | Peter Lindsey |
| 2011 | "Brain Damage" | Peter Lindsey |
| 2011 | "Hammers & Anvils" | Peter Lindsey |
| 2011 | "Saints & Sinners" | I Am Empire |
| 2013 | "Remedy" | I Am Empire |
