= Morella's Forest =

American band (1992–2002)

- Promo photo, 2002

Background information
- Origin: Dayton, Ohio
- Genres: Noise pop, shoegazing
- Years active: 1992–2002
- Labels: Tooth & Nail

Morella's Forest was a band from Dayton, Ohio which formed in 1992. They released three albums on Tooth and Nail Records and one with an independent label. Their signature sound is noise pop or space music comparable to Starflyer 59 or the Breeders.

== Background ==
Before signing to Tooth and Nail, Morella's Forest produced two works: a demo called Bass, and an EP entitled Bozur. Their 1995 debut, Superdeluxe, was produced by Steve Hindalong (The Choir) and Chris Colbert (Fluffy). Its sound was characteristic of 1980s style new wave or 1990s shoegazing. Sonically it featured noisy, "dreamy, hypnotic" melodies, and featured Bill Campbell of the Throes as a guest. Morella's Forest appeared on the cover of 7ball magazine in September, 1996. Ultraphonic Hiss and From Dayton With Love were produced by Keith Cleversley. Ultraphonic features a sound which moves the band slightly away from the noise of their debut. Dayton features some electronic elements—keyboard and drum machine— and moves their sound to an even more sugary guitar based pop sound, which one reviewer referred to as "space age garage pop." Some found this sound to be lacking of "solid melodies," while others found the voice of Sydney Rentz layered over the background lively and fluid.

The band struggled with the Christian music marketplace, finding the struggle between artistic integrity and profitability hard to maintain. After a half-cancelled tour in 1996 the band reported that although they were still "100% about fashion" they would direct their efforts toward the general market and emphasize a radio friendly sound. They told 7ball magazine that the only way to make money was to be like dc Talk or Audio Adrenaline, and as for themselves "We don't want to be some innovative, cool band that's doing something really weird for the Christian market."

Following their 1998 release drummer Nate McCorkle left to join the Christian rock band Johnny Q. Public. The band went through several drummers and played Cornerstone sporadically, but did not generally tour. In 2002 they produced an album entitled Tiny Lights of Heaven. On this album the writing responsibilities were taken by Shawn Johnson instead of long-standing writer Sydney Rentz. With production help from Jesse Sprinkle and Kevin Jackson their music departs a bit from their signature sound, taking a lighter and more indie pop influenced, radio friendly tone.

== Discography ==
- 1995: Hang Out [EP] (Tooth & Nail)
- 1995: Superdeluxe (Reviews: AllMusic, CCM)
- 1996: Ultraphonic Hiss (Review: Allmusic)
- 1998: From Dayton With Love (Reviews: Youthworker, Phantom Tollbooth, 7ball, Cornerstone)
- 2002: Tiny Lights of Heaven (Big Beef (US) / Endearing (CAN), Reviews: Phantom Tollbooth (4), AllMusic)

== Members ==
- Shawn Johnson – guitar (1992–2002)
- Sydney Rentz – vocals (1992–2002)
- Jesse Sprinkle – drums (2001–2002)
- Joel Votaw – bass (2001–2002)
- Christopher McCorkle – bass (1992–1998)
- Nate McCorkle – drums (1992–1998)

== Bibliography ==
- "Morella's Forest". 7ball (2). September–October 1995. ISSN 1082-3980.
- "Morella's Forest". 7ball (24). May–June 1999. ISSN 1082-3980.
