= Ultrabeat (Swedish band) =

Swedish Christian electronic rock band

- Origin: Sweden
- Genres: Electronic music, contemporary Christian music
- Labels: BEC Recordings
- Members: Erik Augustsson

Ultrabeat are a Swedish electronic music group, fronted by Erik Augustsson. The group is classified as contemporary Christian music, with the motto "making phat beats for Jesus Christ".

== Discography ==
Ultrabeat has released three albums through BEC Recordings.

- Trip to a Planet Called Heaven (2000)
- Beyond the Stars (2001)
- E-Praise (2002)
- Shine Thru My Life (2003)
