= Far-Less =

American post-hardcore band

- Origin: Blacksburg/Marion/Pulaski, Virginia, US
- Genres: Post-hardcore
- Years active: 2001–2009 (indefinite hiatus)
- Labels: Tooth & Nail, Solid State, Silent Uproar Records
- Members: Brandon Welch; Jordan Powers; Brandon Hackler; Tyler Hill; Brian Freeman
- Past members: Jacob R. Murray; Ray Felts; Joseph Powers; Todd Turner; Elizabeth "Bitsy" Pina; Mark Karsten; Matt Hudson
- Website: http://www.far-less.net

Far-Less was a five-piece post-hardcore band originally from Marion, Virginia, with members from Marion and other surrounding areas, including Pulaski and Blacksburg. They were signed to Tooth & Nail Records. Far-less played their final show on August 14, 2009, at the Greene Street Club in Greensboro, North Carolina.

== Biography ==
Far-Less began in the summer of 2001 in Marion, Virginia. The original lineup included vocalist Jordan Powers, bassist Joseph Powers, drummer Ray Felts and guitarist Jacob Murray. The quartet quickly wrote and recorded the Emerge EP and played a handful of local shows before the exit of Murray near the end of the year, a change which prompted Jordan's shift to guitar and the inclusion of Brandon Welch as lead vocalist. The band's name is the hyphenated version of a friend's surname.

This lineup was stable for the following year, in which the band released the Apossibility EP and recorded their full-length debut Broken Hearts Unite for the Raleigh, North Carolina–based indie label Silent Uproar Records. Regional tours continued as the band started to receive more attention with Broken Hearts Unite, and eventually Mark Karsten was added as second guitarist.

In 2003 Far-Less started to draw attention from larger record companies, and in 2004 the band was invited to perform in a showcase for Seattle's Tooth and Nail Records. This performance ultimately resulted in a new record label for the band, and the Turn to the Bright EP followed later that year. Following a long period of touring the band returned to the studio to record a second full-length album, Everyone Is Out to Get Us. The record received many positive reviews, as well as a notable 4/5 rating in Alternative Press. More touring ensued, and in 2006 the band parted ways with drummer Ray Felts.

North Carolina native Todd Turner immediately stepped in as the band's new drummer, and with the shifting dynamic of the band came a renewed creative energy which came to fruition with the group's third album A Toast to Bad Taste. In the middle of the recording process the group added keyboardist Elizabeth “Bitsy” Pina to its ranks. Tours in the United States and Canada followed, with the record being released in 2007—again to critical acclaim—but with low sales. Shortly thereafter, bassist Joseph Powers left the band and returned to school. Karsten and Turner soon followed in his footsteps.

2008 proved to be a strenuous year for Far-Less, yet the band pushed on with the aid of long-time friends Brandon Hackler on guitar and Tyler Hill on drums. A national tour in the spring of 2008 resulted in the loss of Pina, but the band managed to finish the tour dates with help from Mike Schey (of The Format and The Honorary Title), Josh King (of House of Fools) and Robert Smith (of MAE and Tokyo). After a brief hiatus the band filled the empty bass slot with Brian Freeman, moved to Radford, Virginia and continued the writing process. The forthcoming Headache EP is the result, and was due to be released digitally by Tooth & Nail Records in the summer of 2009, but for unknown reasons the EP has yet to come out.

Far-Less played its final show at the Greene Street Club in Greensboro, North Carolina. The band ended its career with a twenty-song set including songs from all past albums and EPs. The band had many special guests at the show, including Josh King of House of Fools, and were able to reassemble many of the past members to create a Far-Less "super group" with performances by Ray Felts, Joseph Powers, Todd Turner, and Mark Karsten, along with the final line-up of the band (Brandon Welch, Jordan Powers, Brandon Hackler, Tyler Joel Hill, and Brian Freeman).

== Band members ==
=== Final line-up ===
- Brandon Welch - lead vocals, guitar
- Jordan Powers - Guitar & Vocals
- Brandon Hackler - Guitar
- Brian Freeman - Bass
- Tyler Hill - Drums

=== Former members ===
- Jacob R. Murray - guitar (2001–2002)
- Ray Felts - drums (2001–2006)
- Joseph "Joep" Powers - bass (2001–2007)
- Todd Turner - drums (2006–2008)
- Elizabeth "Bitsy" Pina - keyboard (2007–2008)
- Mark Karsten - guitar (2003–2008)
