= Poor Old Lu =

Christian alternative rock band

- Origin: Vashon Island, Washington, US
- Genres: Alternative, Christian rock, pop punk
- Years active: 1990–2002, 2011, 2013, 2014
- Labels: Alarma, KMG, Tooth & Nail
- Past members: Scott Hunter; Jesse Sprinkle; Aaron Sprinkle; Nick Barber
- Website: www.pooroldlu.com

Poor Old Lu was a pioneering Christian alternative rock band based in the American Northwest. The band experimented with a variety of sounds and genres, particularly grunge, funk and psychedelic rock. The band consisted of Scott Hunter (vocals), Jesse Sprinkle (drums), Aaron Sprinkle (guitar), and Nick Barber (bass). Hunter was the lyricist who wrote on philosophical, metaphorical, and spiritually oriented topics. Common themes in the lyrics include introspective struggles with identity and spirituality, struggles with a superficial, secular, and modern society, and hope for life abundant. The Encyclopedia of Contemporary Christian Music calls the band "One of the most accomplished and creative Christian bands of the '90s".

The name refers to The Lion, the Witch and the Wardrobe, in which Lucy ('Lu'), returns from Narnia and tells her brother, Peter. Peter doesn't believe her story, however, and responds patronizingly, "Poor old Lu, hiding and nobody noticed."

== History ==
The band began as "BellBangVilla", recording an album, 'In Love with the Greenery,' in 1990. The band changed its name to Poor Old Lu and recorded a three-song demo tape in 1991. In 1992, they recorded their first full-length album, Star-Studded-Super-Step, reworking some of the songs from 'In Love with the Greenery' for the album. Originally released on cassette, the album was re-released on CD by Alarma Records in 1995.

In 1993, they released Mindsize, produced by Terry Taylor and Derri Daugherty. It turned out to be their breakthrough. The following summer, the band recruited engineer/producer John Goodmanson, and Sin was recorded and released in 1994. In 1995, they released Straight Six, an EP which featured Jeremy Enigk of Sunny Day Real Estate on one track. In 1996 they released A Picture of the Eighth Wonder.

In late 1996, the band broke up, playing their farewell concert in Seattle, Washington in November 1996. The concert was recorded and released in 1998 as In Their Final Performance.

In 2002, the band reunited and recorded The Waiting Room for Tooth and Nail Records. In support of this release, the band reunited for a number of shows in 2002, playing at select venues in Seattle as well as a few select Christian music festivals that included Cornerstone, TomFest and Purple Door.

== After Poor Old Lu ==
After the group's initial break-up, band members moved on to independent projects. In 1997, Nick Barber joined with Aaron Sprinkle in the group Rose Blossom Punch. Nick Barber played in the bands Meekin Pop and Blue Collar Love. By the time Rose Blossom Punch split up, Aaron Sprinkle had started a solo career,. He has released seven albums since 1999. In 2005, Aaron Sprinkle formed the band Fair with Joey Sanchez, Nick Barber and Erik Newbill.

Jesse Sprinkle moved to New York. He ran the recording studio the Illuminata in Dansville, New York until early 2006, when the studio closed. He opened a new studio, Bluebrick Recordings, in 2007. He has played drums in a number of bands, including Morella's Forest, Demon Hunter and Dead Poetic. He has also recorded a number of solo albums.

In 2006, Hunter started a new band, This Diminishing West, which broke up after releasing an EP online.

In 2018, Aaron and Jesse released an EP of six songs under the moniker Blank Books.

== Post-2002 reunions ==
Poor Old Lu reunited in 2011 for an acoustic house show.

In 2013, the group gathered to record one song, "The Great Unwound". It was written and released in support of "Paradise Uganda", a ministry of Jesse Sprinkle. No statements about future releases were made.

In 2014, the group recorded a Christmas song with Vekora; it is entitled "The Brightest Star".

In 2025, Poor Old Lu played shows in Seattle and Nashville to celebrate the vinyl release of their 1995 EP Straight Six. The Seattle show was supported by Rose Blossom Punch and The Prayer Chain, and the Nashville show saw Poor Old Lu open for The Prayer Chain, who were celebrating the 30th anniversary of their album Mercury. The Seattle show was recorded and released in 2026 as At the Showbox, their second live album.

== Members ==
- Scott Hunter – lead vocals, lyrics
- Jesse Sprinkle – drums, percussion, vocals
- Aaron Sprinkle – guitar, keyboards, vocals
- Nick Barber – bass guitar, vocals

== Discography ==
- In Love with the Greenery [as BellBangVilla] (1990) cassette only
- Three Song Demo (1991) cassette only
- Star-Studded-Super-Step (1992) cassette only
- Mindsize (1993, Alarma Records, Review: Jesus Freak Hideout)
- Split 7-inch with Mortal (1993, Intense Records)
- Sin (1994, Alarma Records, Reviews: Jesus Freak Hideout, Cross Rhythms)
- Sin LP w/ bonus track (1994, Alarma Records)
- Straight Six (1995, Alarma Records, Review: Cross Rhythms)
- Star-Studded-Super-Step (1995, independent, Reviews: The Phantom Tollbooth)
- Sit and Stare VHS (1995, Alarma Records)
- A Picture of the Eighth Wonder (1996, Alarma Records, Reviews: Jesus Freak Hideout, Cross Rhythms)
- In Their Final Performance (1998, KMG Records, Reviews: HM Magazine)
- Chrono [1993-1998] (1998, KMG Records, Reviews: The Phantom Tollbooth, HM Magazine)
- Star-Studded-Super-Step CD re-release (1998, KMG Records)
- Mindsize/Sin [minus "Peapod", "Sickly", and "Come to Me"] ( 2000, KMG Records - "Classic Archives")
- Poor Old Lu & Serene (promo 2002, Tooth and Nail Records)
- The Waiting Room (2002, Tooth and Nail Records)
- "The Great Unwound" (song, 2013)
- At the Showbox (2026, independent, Reviews: Jesusfreakhideout)

=== Compilation appearances ===
- Browbeat: Unplugged Alternative – "Drenched Decent" (1995, Alarma Records)
- CHR Sampler 95 - Spring Tunes – "Ring True" (promo 1995, Frontline Records)
- Persuading You Near – "Thoughtless (Concept Version)" (1996, Working Man Records)
- Noises from the Top of the Alarma Hotel – "Receive", "Chance for the Chancers" (promo 1996, Alarma Records)
- Sparkler Vol. 1 – "It's Simple to Me" (1997, Spark Recordings)
- Happy Christmas Vol. 3 – "What Child Is This?" (2001, BEC Recordings)
- Here & Now – "Revolve" (2003, BEC Recordings)
