= Plankeye =

Christian alternative rock band

- Origin: Orange County, California, U.S.
- Genres: Christian rock; punk rock; alternative rock; grunge; post-grunge; pop rock; power pop; indie rock
- Years active: 1991–2002
- Labels: Tooth & Nail, BEC
- Past members: Scott A. Silletta; Luis F. Garcia; Adam Ferry; Eric Fielding Balmer; Ryan Dennee; Shane Valdez; Jeremiah Shackleford; Kevin Poush; Louie Ruiz

Plankeye (also spelled PlankEye and Plank Eye)^{1} was an American Christian rock band that formed in 1991 in Orange County, California. The band's name is derived from Matthew 7:3 in the New Testament:

"Why do you look at the speck of sawdust in your brother’s eye and pay no attention to the plank in your own eye?"

The text "Matthew 7:3" appears on the front cover and in the booklet of the original 1993 release of Plankeye's debut album, Spill, in reference to the biblical passage.

== History ==
Plankeye formed in November 1991 and consisted of Scott A. Silletta on vocals and lead guitar, Luis F. Garcia on bass guitar, and Adam Ferry on drums. Plankeye's first studio album, Spill, was released independently on Walk the Plank Records in autumn 1993, with the band being signed with Tooth & Nail Records soon after. In October 1993, Eric Fielding Balmer joined the band as an additional guitarist. Spill was reissued on Tooth & Nail with new artwork on April 15, 1994 and one song, "Scared", from the album was released as a single. Plankeye's second studio album, The Spark, was released on March 10, 1995; the album's song "Open House" was used for the band's first music video in 1995, which was directed by Michael Peleaux. On June 7, 1996, Plankeye released Commonwealth, their third studio album, which introduced a more polished and mature sound. Commonwealth is the Plankeye's only album with a title track, as well as the band's only album to have more than one music video, with one being made for "B.C." in 1996 and another for "Push Me Down" in 1997; both were directed by Darren Doane. Over the course of the next year, the group toured constantly, opening for the Newsboys.

On November 4, 1997, Plankeye released their best-selling album, The One and Only. To promote the album, Plankeye headlined "The One & Only Tour", featuring opening act the Insyderz. Ryan Dennee played rhythm guitar as a touring member. In 1998, a music video for the song "Someday" was released, being directed by Darren Doane and Ken Daurio. Lead singer Scott Silletta and drummer Adam Ferry later left Plankeye in July that year. Ferry left to become a youth pastor while Silletta formed a record label called Vanishing Point Records and also created his own recording studio called Orange Crush Studio, located in Orange, California. Shane Valdez became the Plankeye's drummer for live performances in 1998, while Jeremiah Shackleford played guitar at live shows for the band in 1999.

On June 8, 1999, Balmer and Garcia released Relocation, Plankeye's fifth studio album, on the record label BEC Recordings, an imprint of Tooth & Nail Records. In 1999, the song "Goodbye" was used for Plankeye's last music video; it was directed by Michael Peleaux. Some wondered if this song was subtly referencing Scott and Adam's departure from the band, something which Eric and Luis refuted. BEC Recordings later released two discs containing a total of six singles from Relocation. In 2001, Plankeye's song "When It Comes" was chosen by MP3.com to be included on their radio show The Download, successfully winning against 12,000 alternative bands on the website to get on the show.

On April 10, 2001, Plankeye's sixth studio album, Strange Exchange, was released. Kevin Poush and Louie Ruiz joined the band on guitar and drums, respectively, to assist in the recording of the album. Both Poush and Ruiz left Plankeye the following year. Plankeye's last release and only compilation album was announced on the band's official website on November 30, 2001. Wings to Fly, released on July 18, 2002, contains one song from Spill, The Spark, and Strange Exchange, three songs from Commonwealth, The One and Only, and Relocation, re-recorded versions of "Bicycle" and "Goodbye", and five new songs. The track "Down to the Altar" was Plankeye's last single. Former band member Adam Ferry contributed to the compilation, playing drums on the songs "Scared of Me" and "Down to the Altar", both of which included Beth Balmer, Eric Balmer's wife, contributing keys and background vocals. Plankeye disbanded in 2002.

== Side projects ==
Scott Silletta performed both vocals and guitar on the track "The Ballad of the Blamed" as a guest musician on American Christian hardcore punk band The Blamed's debut studio album, 21, in 1994. Following his departure from Plankeye in July 1998, Silletta formed the Christian pop-punk band Fanmail that year. In 1999, Fanmail released an extended play, Here Comes Fanmail EP, and their debut studio album, The Latest Craze, with the former containing a cover of The Police's 1983 single "Every Breath You Take." In the same year, the band's only music video, "Rock and Roll Star", was released; it was directed by Derek Dale. Fanmail's second studio album, Fanmail 2000, was released in 2000 and included a cover of the Backstreet Boys' 1999 single "I Want It That Way"; it was the band's last release before the group disbanded in 2002. The band's song "Superfan" was featured on the soundtrack to the 2001 movie Extreme Days as well as in the film. "Rock and Roll Star" and the band's cover of "I Want It That Way" appeared on the Tooth & Nail Tenth Anniversary compilation in 2003. Silletta formed another Christian punk rock band, The Franchise, which released one studio album, Original Inevitable, on his Vanishing Point Records label on August 12, 2003. Silletta later released a solo album, The Life and Times of..., on June 17, 2011.

Former Plankeye member Adam Ferry joined the band Other Desert Cities and played drums on their 2002 self-titled debut album, on which Beth Balmer performed vocals, accordion, hammond organ, and piano. Ferry also played drums on American Christian ska band The O.C. Supertones' first live album, Live! Volume One, in 2002.

After Plankeye broke up in 2002, Eric Balmer formed the indie folk rock band Fielding with his wife, Beth, in 2004. Fielding has released an extended play, Our Side Is An Ocean, on July 9, 2013, and three studio albums: a self-titled album on October 18, 2005, The Voice of Us on April 14, 2009, and Rags of Light on March 29, 2019.

== Musical style ==
Plankeye's sound changed throughout the band's eleven-year career. Plankeye's style could be defined as melodic post-grunge combined with alternative and indie elements. Their first few albums also incorporated a fair amount of punk rock elements, but this aspect faded when original singer Scott Silletta left the band. The band's first album consisted solely of punk rock, while their second and third albums saw significant incorporations of grunge and alternative rock styles, as well as post-grunge elements. The band changed genres on their fourth album, which had a focus on power pop and pop rock, the latter of which would be incorporated into the music on Plankeye's fifth release alongside the already prominent alternative rock from previous releases. Plankeye's last studio album and compilation album included songs with slower, more melodic compositions and indie rock influences.

== Legacy ==
Plankeye is considered to be one of Tooth & Nail Records' greatest successes of the 1990s and early 2000s. The band's albums Commonwealth, The One and Only, and The Spark were ranked at #74, #67, and #57, respectively, on Jesus Freak Hideout's "Top 100 Tooth & Nail Albums of All Time" in 2018.

== Members ==
- Scott A. Silletta – vocals, guitar (1991–1998)
- Luis F. Garcia – bass guitar (1991–2002), vocals (1999–2002), keyboards (2001)
- Adam Ferry – drums, percussion (1991–1998, 2002)
- Eric Fielding Balmer – guitar (1993–2002), vocals (1999–2002)
- Ryan Dennee – rhythm guitar (1998, live only)
- Shane Valdez – drums (1998, live only)
- Jeremiah Shackelford – guitar (1999, live only)
- Kevin Poush – guitar (2001–2002)
- Louie Ruiz – drums (2001–2002)

== Discography ==
Plankeye discography
- Studio albums: 6
- Compilation albums: 1
- Singles: 8
- Music videos: 5

Studio albums

- Spill (1993)
- The Spark (1995)
- Commonwealth (1996)
- The One and Only (1997)
- Relocation (1999)
- Strange Exchange (2001)

Compilation albums

- Wings to Fly (2002)

Music videos

- "Open House" (The Spark, 1995)
- "B.C." (Commonwealth, 1996)
- "Push Me Down" (Commonwealth, 1997)
- "Someday" (The One and Only, 1998)
- "Goodbye" (Relocation, 1999)

Singles

- "Scared" (1994)
- "Goodbye" (2000)
- "Say Now That You're Sorry" (2000)
- "Call Me Liar" (2000)
- "Break My Fall" (2000)
- "You Got It" (2000)
- "Honey and Oil" (2000)
- "Down to the Altar" (2002)

== Notes ==
^{1.} Official name spellings written in various booklets of the band's albums.
