= Flight 180 =

Christian ska band

- Also known as: 180 (One Eighty)
- Origin: Orange County, California
- Genres: Christian ska, ska punk, pop punk, swing revival
- Years active: 1998–2001
- Label: BEC
- Past members: Kim Tennberg; Madelyn Mendoza; Jerry Elekes; Chris Tennberg; Dave Des Armier; Chris Keller; Jamin Boggs; Josh Brisby; John Anderson
- Website: facebook.com/Flight180band

Flight 180 (first known as 180 or One Eighty) was an American Christian ska band, with punk and swing influences, from Orange County, California. Fronted by Kim Tennberg, singer and songwriter, they formed in 1998 and disbanded in 2001, releasing three albums with BEC Recordings: Crackerjack (1998), Lineup (1999) and Girls and Boys (2001).

== Background ==
The band formed in Orange County, California, in 1998. They released their first major label studio album, Crackerjack, by BEC Recordings, on November 3, 1998. Line Up was released on September 14, 1999, and Girls and Boys was released on February 27, 2001, by BEC Recordings. They disbanded as a group in 2001. Members Kim Tennberg, Chris Tennberg, Jamin Boggs and Josh Brisby continued to tour and record music independently after their third and final album was released.

== Members ==
- Kim Tennberg - lead vocals, songwriter, trumpet
- Madelyn Mendoza - vocals, percussion
- Jerry Elekes - lead guitar
- Chris Tennberg - rhythm guitar
- Dave Des Armier - bass
- Jamin Boggs - drums
- Josh Brisby - trombone
- John Anderson - tenor saxophone

== Discography ==
Studio albums

- Crackerjack (November 3, 1998, BEC)
- Lineup (September 14, 1999, BEC)
- Girls and Boys (February 27, 2001, BEC)

== See also ==
- The O.C. Supertones – a Christian, third-wave ska band also from Orange County, California
- Dance Hall Crashers – another former ska punk band with two leading female vocalists
