= Hangnail (band) =

American pop punk band

- Origin: Kenosha, Wisconsin, U.S.
- Genres: Pop punk, Melodic punk, punk
- Years active: 1993–2003 2020-
- Labels: BEC/Tooth & Nail, EMI CMG
- Past members: Matt Wendt; Nick Radovanovic; Mike Middleton; Jacob Dosemagen

Hangnail is a pop punk band from Kenosha, Wisconsin, formed in 1993.

== History ==
Hangnail consists of Mike Middleton (lead vocals and bass guitar), Nick Radovanovic (lead guitar and backing vocals), Matt Wendt (rhythm guitar and backing vocals), and Jacob Dosemagen (drums). The band has a diverse mix of musical influences which has helped to form their unique sound characterized by harmony laden pop melodies and prolific guitar work with an energetic feel. Their songs focus on life from a Christian perspective, which is the band's foundation.

The band formed as teenagers when Mike met Nick and Jacob, who were already making music together. Matt joined the band shortly thereafter, and this has been the lineup ever since. Hangnail produced its own music and played out regionally through high school. Shortly after graduation, the band started building a fan base and received the opportunity to play on the new band showcase stage at Cornerstone Music Festival in the summer of 1998. Hangnail received interest from a few different record labels and finally agreed to sign with BEC Recordings, an imprint of Tooth and Nail Records.

Hangnail independently recorded their self-titled album and BEC purchased and released that album in the fall of 1999. Beginning in 2000, the band began 3 years of an intense tour schedule. During that time the band wrote and recorded two other full-length albums: “Facing Changes” (2001) and “Transparent” (2003) which were released on Tooth and Nail Records. They also recorded an acoustic EP that was released in 2001 and a live album which was recorded in 2002, but was not released until 2016 when the band received permission to make it available independently.

Hangnail disbanded in 2003 but have played a few live shows since. The band began working on new material in 2020.

== Style ==
Hangnail's punk-pop style combined rhythms from heavy metal and melodic punk rock with pop music flourishes. According to Allmusic, this style was mixed with "praise-oriented lyrics to come up with a unique sound that rocks wildly with metal riffs and power chords." The band's musical influences varied. According to Mike Middleton, when Hangnail first started the members liked bands such as Green Day and Weezer. Other early influences include MxPx. According to Middleton, the band broadened its listening tastes to a wide variety of genres ranging from classical to rock and roll.

== Line up ==
- Jacob Dosemagen – drums
- Matt Wendt – guitar, vocals
- Mike Middleton – bass guitar, vocals
- Nick Radovanovic – guitar, vocals

== Discography ==
- Hangnail (1999)
- Facing Changes/Acoustic EP (2001)
- Transparent (2003)
- Hangnail: Live (2016) – recorded in 2002

Collaborative works

- Happy Christmas Vol. 2 (1999)
- Happy Christmas Vol. 3 (2001)
- Start Right Here: Remembering the Life of Keith Green (2008)
