= Steven Dail =

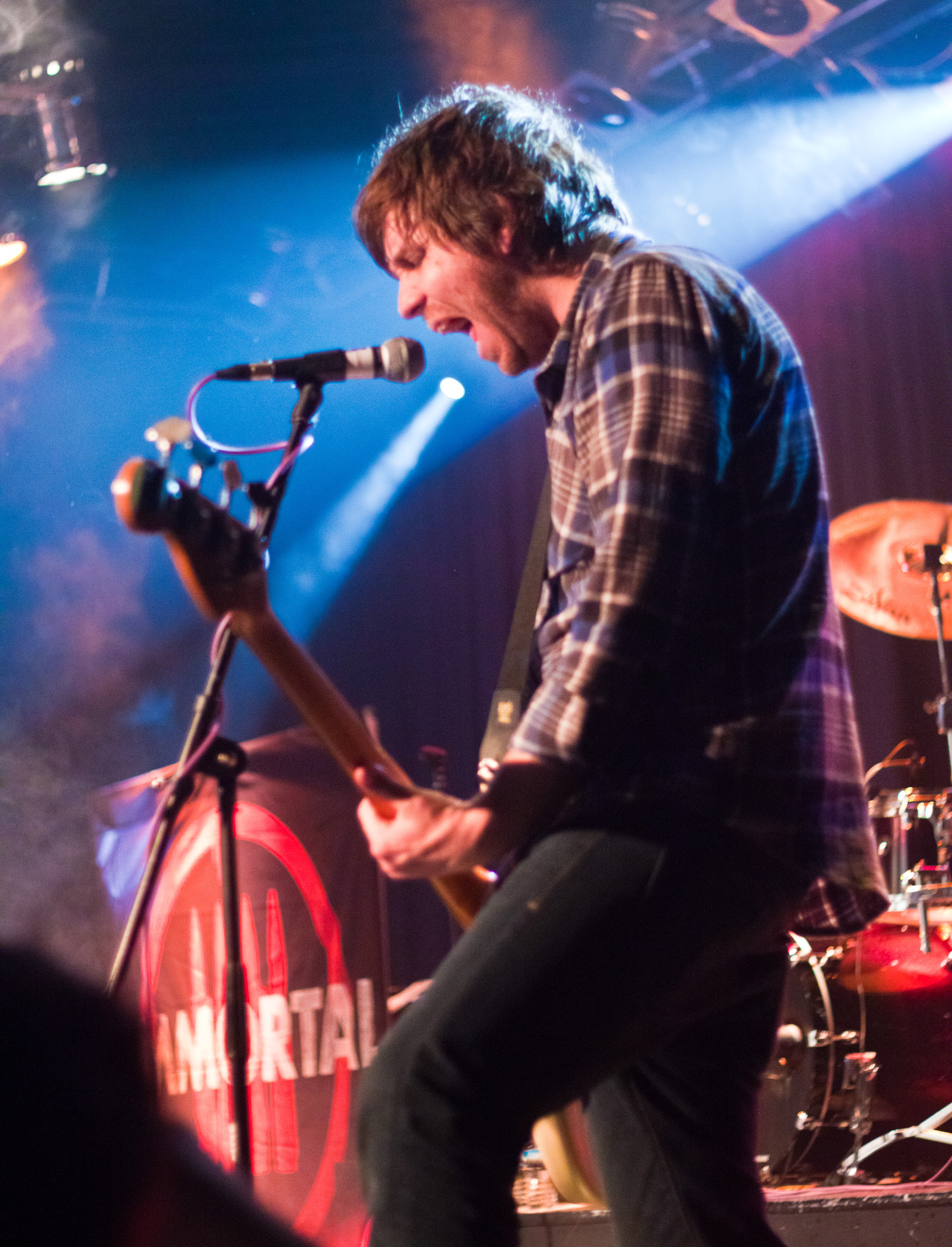
- Dail performing with Project 86 in 2010

Background information
- Born: Steven Dail
- Genres: Christian metal; post-hardcore; experimental rock; metalcore
- Occupations: Musician; songwriter; producer; assistant engineer
- Instruments: Bass guitar, backing vocals, guitar, keyboards
- Years active: 1996–present
- Website: Steven Dail on MySpace

Steven Dail is a musician who is known for playing bass guitar in several Christian metal bands including Project 86 and White Lighter, and Christian punk band Crash Rickshaw. Other bands he has played in are Starflyer 59, Low & Behold, Innermeans and Bloodshed.

Dail is best known for his career with the alternative metal band Project 86, but he has also been a part of several other notable projects. Though Dail continues actively with White Lighter and Starflyer 59, he mentioned recently that Neon Horse and Crash Rickshaw could potentially reunite.

== History ==
Dail began his musical career with the band Innermeans, a hardcore punk band out of California. In this band, he started off playing guitars. The band would record their debut EP, Innermeans, which was released in 1997. Afterward, the band disbanded, which according to Dail, was not a dramatic ordeal. With Innermeans disbanded, a majority of the members, including Dail, joined Bloodshed. However, Bloodshed did not continue under that name, instead going under the name Slingshot David, recording an EP.

By this point, Dail had gotten to know Andrew Schwab and Randy Torres very well. Project 86 had been an active band prior to Dail joining, with Ethan Luck being the active bassist. Dail replaced Luck after his departure, and helped record on the band's debut album, Project 86. Dail, throughout his career with the band, would be one of the band's most prolific songwriters, alongside Torres, with the pair writing a majority of the songs on Drawing Black Lines and a majority of the material following. In 2001, Dail and Alex Albert of Project 86, Innermeans formed Crash Rickshaw with Joby Harris, a longtime friend of Dail's. They released Crash Rickshaw in 2001.

Throughout the band's career, Project 86's core lineup would continue working together on the next three records, Truthless Heroes which Atlantic Records released, Songs to Burn Your Bridges By which the band self-released initially, and ...And the Rest Will Follow. At this time, Albert departed from the band. Though Albert remained bandmates with Torres and Dail in Crash Rickshaw, he was no longer involved in Project 86. At this time, Dail joined Starflyer 59, focusing a different genre of music. In his first year with Starflyer 59, he recorded two releases with the band – I Win and My Island.

The same year, Project 86 released their sixth album, Rival Factions. It saw a departure from the typical sound the band had portrayed, taking a much more alternative rock and gothic rock approach, as well as introducing new drummer Jason Gerken. After the album was finished, however, Torres would depart from the band in 2009. Around the same time, Crash Rickshaw releases their second album, which was their final release. Dail wrote and recorded a majority of the band's next album, Picket Fence Cartel, even playing guitar and bass on the album, as well taking demos from Torres. After the album came out, Dail would tour with the band on the Scream the Prayer Tour, which lasted about nine weeks.

Following the tour, Dail departed from the band, citing that he had been miserable and stressed for a long time and regretted not leaving when Torres left, who had been his best friend for years. By this time, Neon Horse and Crash Rickshaw had both ended, leaving Dail's only active venture being Starflyer 59.

== Discography ==
Project 86

- Project 86 (1998)
- Drawing Black Lines (2000)
- Truthless Heroes (2002)
- Songs to Burn Your Bridges By (2003)
- ...And the Rest Will Follow (2005)
- Rival Factions (2007)
- The Kane Mutiny EP (2007)
- this Time of Year EP (2008)
- Picket Fence Cartel (2009)

Crash Rickshaw

- Crash Rickshaw (2001)
- The Unknown Clarity (2007)

Starflyer 59

- I Win (2006)
- My Island (2006)
- Dial M (2008)
- Minor Keys (2009)
- The Changing of the Guard (2010)
- IAMACEO (2013)
- Slow (2016)
- Young in My Head (2019)
- Vanity (2021)
- Lust for Gold (2024)

Neon Horse

- Neon Horse (2007)
- Haunted Horse: Songs of Love, Defiance, and Delusion (2009)

Low & Behold

- Uppers (2015)

White Lighter

- White Lighter (2014)

Innermeans

- Innermeans (1997)

Slingshot David

- Demo (1997)

Other credits

- Lies by Bon Voyage (2008)
- Blair Witch 2 by Various (2000)
- Soul Survivors by Various (2001)
- Another Song...EP by The Dark Romantics (2006)
- The Brothers Martin by The Brothers Martin (2007)
- Love is For the Rich by Surrogate (2007)
- The Pillars of Humanity (Re-Release) by The Crucified (2009)

== Bands ==
Current

- Starflyer 59 – bass (2006–present)
- White Lighter – bass (2010–present)

Former

- Project 86 – bass, guitar, backing vocals (1997–2010)
- Neon Horse – bass (2007–2009)
- Bloodshed – bass (1996-1997)
- Innermeans – guitar (1997–1998)
- Low & Behold – bass (2008–2011)

On Hiatus

- Crash Rickshaw – bass (2001–?)
