= Dear Diary (FM Static album) =

Studio album by FM Static
- Released: April 7, 2009
- Recorded: 2008
- Genres: Rock opera, pop punk, Christian rock
- Length: 32:28
- Label: Tooth & Nail
- Producers: Aaron Sprinkle, Trevor McNevan

FM Static chronology
Critically Ashamed (2006)	Dear Diary (2009)	My Brain Says Stop, But My Heart Says Go! (2011)

Professional ratings
Review scores
Source	Rating
Cross Rhythms	9/10 squares
Indie Vision Music	4/5 stars
Jesusfreakhideout.com	4.5/5 stars 3.5/5 stars
Sputnik Music	2/5 stars

Dear Diary is a Christian rock opera, and the third studio album by the pop punk band FM Static. It was released on April 7, 2009, through Tooth & Nail Records.

According to Trevor McNevan "It's a concept record, the entire album will be one story from beginning to end. It's based on a boy (and occasionally a girl) and their diary entries about what's going on in their lives. It deals with faith, doubt, love, death, and the honest questions that surround living and growing up in modern day culture. We're very pumped about this record and are excited to share it with you." The cover art was drawn by Worth Dying For guitarist Nathan Parrish.

== Track listing ==
All tracks are written by FM Static.

Album release
No.	Title	Length
1.	"Boy Moves to a New Town With Optimistic Outlook"	3:42
2.	"The Unavoidable Battle of Feeling on the Outside"	3:37
3.	"Boy Meets Girl (and Vice Versa)"	3:05
4.	"Sometimes You Can Forget Who You Are"	3:16
5.	"Man Whatcha Doin'?"	2:10
6.	"The Voyage of Beliefs" (featuring Tricia Brock of Superchick)	3:16
7.	"Her Father's Song"	3:25
8.	"Take Me as I Am"	3:34
9.	"Dear God"	3:50
10.	"The Shindig (Off to College)"	2:55
Total length:		32:27

Prior to the album's release, the songs "Boy Moves to a New Town With Optimistic Outlook", "The Unavoidable Battle of Feeling on the Outside", and "Take Me As I Am" were released on the band's MySpace page.

== Personnel ==
- Trevor McNevan - vocals, guitars
- Steve Augustine - drums
- Randy Torres - guitars, bass
- Adam Smith - piano

== Charts ==
Chart (2009)	Peak position
US Billboard 200	199
US Christian Albums	16
US Heatseeker Albums	6
