= Randy Torres =

American rock musician

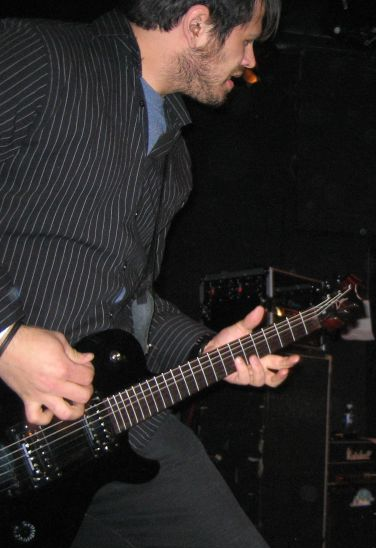
- Torres in 2006

Background information
- Born: Randy Torres
- Genres: Metal, Rock
- Occupations: Musician, songwriter, sound designer
- Instruments: Guitar, vocals, keyboards, percussion
- Years active: 1996–present
- Website: randytorres.com

Randy Torres is an American guitarist, percussionist, keyboardist and background vocalist from Seattle. He has previously played for the bands Project 86 and Crash Rickshaw. He has filled in as rhythm guitarist for the band Demon Hunter and as keyboardist, guitarist, percussionist and background vocalist for Anberlin on a recent tour. He has worked as a producer/engineer for Aaron Sprinkle, and for the A&R division of Tooth & Nail Records. He is now a composer for film and TV. He currently is working on a project with Ryan Clark called NYVES (pronounced "knives"), funded through Kickstarter.

== History ==
Randy Torres began his musical career in 1996, when he formed Project 86, alongside vocalist Andrew Schwab, drummer Ethan Luck, and bassist Matt "Bean" Hernandez. However, Torres and Schwab quickly became the only original members, as Hernandez departed to play for Unashamed, while Luck went to play for The Dingees. The band would begin to take off after hiring Torres' longtime best friend Steven Dail and drummer Alex Albert, who had previously both been a part of Innermeans. The four recorded their debut album, which was self-titled, and released it through BEC Recordings. After that album, the band signed to Atlantic Records and re-released their sophomore album, Drawing Black Lines, which saw high commercial success. Around this time, Torres, Dail, Schwab, and Albert would be joined by a fifth member for a brief time, with Corey Edelmann of No Innocent Victim joining the band. The band would go on a tour titled Kings of the Game tour, alongside P.O.D., hed PE, and Linkin Park.

Torres was one of the band's key songwriters, during his tenure, alongside Dail. Between the two, a majority of the song structures were created for the next several records, including Truthless Heroes, Songs to Burn Your Bridges By, ...And the Rest Will Follow, and Rival Factions. During this time, he would also work with Aaron Sprinkle, as an additional producer and engineer. However, in 2009, Torres would depart from the band, as it was no longer enjoyable. Despite this, he was credited on the band's next record, Picket Fence Cartel, even though he did not record on it. Dail, however, did use material from Torres' demos, hence why he was credited. Following his tenure with the band, he continued to work with Sprinkle for a few years, as well as tour with Demon Hunter, until he became A&R at Tooth & Nail Records. During his time at the label, he signed bands such as I Am Empire and The Letter Black. He would then leave his position to tour with Anberlin in 2010. Once the tours finished, he reached out to a contact he had during his time with Sprinkle, who worked at Microsoft. Torres would then be hired by Microsoft and began working with them on video games as a composer.

After he worked with Microsoft, he would eventually leave to get into the film industry, working on sound, with the contact who helped him at Microsoft helping him once more. While involved in the industry, he worked on films such Suicide Squad, Dunkirk, and a plethora of others. As a side project to his main career, Torres formed the project known as NYVES, which featured him and Ryan Clark, a longtime friend of Torres' and the lead vocalist of Demon Hunter and Training for Utopia. The project, an extreme departure from anything the two had done previously, aside from Clark's project Low & Behold. NYVES released the album, Anxiety, came out in June 2015. The project also released an EP, Pressure EP.

== Bands ==
Current

- NYVES (2014–present)
- The Celebrated Heroes (solo)

Former

- Project 86 (1996-2009)
- Monstruos del mar
- Electric Legs
- Crash Rickshaw (2001–2008)

Touring

- Demon Hunter - guitar (2009)
- Anberlin - rhythm guitar, percussion, keyboards, backing vocals (2010)

Session

- FM Static - guitars on Critically Ashamed (2006)
- Falling Up - engineering, guitars and bass on Captiva (2007)
- Capital Lights - engineering on This is an Outrage! (2008)
- Thousand Foot Krutch - guitars on Welcome to the Masquerade (2009)

== Selected discography ==
Project 86

- Project 86 (1998)
- Drawing Black Lines (2000)
- Truthless Heroes (2002)
- Songs to Burn Your Bridges By (2004)
- ...And the Rest Will Follow (2006)
- Rival Factions (2007)
- The Kane Mutiny EP (2007)
- This Time of Year EP (2008)
- Picket Fence Cartel (2009; only writing)

Crash Rickshaw

- Crash Rickshaw (2001)
- The Unknown Clarity (2008)

NYVES

- Anxiety (2015)
- Pressure EP (2016)

Additional musician

- Stavesacre - How to Live With a Curse (2006; Keyboards)
- Falling Up - Captiva (2007; Bass and Guitars)
- Ruth - Secondhand Dreaming (2007; Guitars)
- Ruth - Anorak (2008; Guitars)
- Showbread - Nervosa (2008; Guitars and Keyboards)
- KJ-52 - Five-Two Television (2009; Drum Programming)
- Demon Hunter - The World Is a Thorn (2010; Backing Vocals)
- Fair - Disappearing World (2010; Guitars)

Production

- Critically Ashamed by FM Static (2006)
- Captiva by Falling Up (2007)
- Anorexia by Showbread (2008)
- Welcome to the Masquerade by Thousand Foot Krutch (2009)
- Dark Dungeons (2014, soundtrack)
- Exile by Demon Hunter (2022, soundtrack design for deluxe version)
