= Wait for the Siren =

Studio album by Project 86
- Released: August 21, 2012
- Genre: Alternative metal, Christian metal, post-hardcore
- Length: 47:50
- Label: Independent
- Producer: Andrew Schwab, Steve Wilson

Project 86 chronology
Picket Fence Cartel (2009)	Wait for the Siren (2012)	Knives to the Future (2014)

Wait for the Siren marks the eighth album from Project 86. The band released the project independently on August 21, 2012. Project 86 worked with Andrew Schwab and Steve Wilson on the production of this album.

== Reception ==
Professional ratings
Review scores
Source	Rating
HM Magazine	4/5 stars
Indie Vision Music	5/5 stars
Jesus Freak Hideout	5/5 stars
New Release Tuesday	5/5 stars

Specifying in a four star review by HM Magazine, Dan MacIntosh responds, "Inspiration is an intangible: either a band sounds inspired or it doesn't and Project 86 most certainly comes off born anew with Wait for the Siren... Don't wait for any siren; make Project 86's new album the very next sound you hear." Michael Weaver, indicating in a five star review from Jesus Freak Hideout, recognizes, "From the musical to the lyrical, this is the most well-rounded Project 86 album to date." New Release Tuesday's Mary Nikkel delivering a five star review, replying, "This release promises to stand the test of time as a monument in the hardcore field." Specifying in a five star review by Indie Vision Music, Lee Brown reports, "Wait for the Siren continues to bring a new and diverse sound while still being distinctly Project 86."

== Track listing ==
No.	Title	Length
1.	"Fall Goliath Fall"	4:16
2.	"SOTS" (featuring Bruce Fitzhugh of Living Sacrifice)	3:16
3.	"Omerta's Sons"	3:34
4.	"Off the Grid"	2:58
5.	"New Transmission"	3:08
6.	"Defector"	3:40
7.	"The Crossfire Gambit" (featuring Brian "Head" Welch of Korn and Love and Death)	3:15
8.	"Blood Moon"	4:10
9.	"Above the Desert Sea"	4:14
10.	"Ghosts of Easter Rising"	3:45
11.	"Avalantia"	4:15
12.	"Take the Hill"	5:08
13.	"Wait for the Siren"	2:11
Total length:		47:50

== Personnel ==
- Andrew Schwab – vocals, production
- Dustin Lowery – guitar, backing vocals
- Scott Davis – layout design, percussion

Additional musicians

- Bruce Fitzhugh (Living Sacrifice) – guest vocals on track 2
- Brian "Head" Welch (Love & Death, Korn) – guest vocals on track 7
- Andrew Welch (Disciple) – guitar
- Blake Martin (A Plea for Purging) – guitar
- Cody Driggers (The Wedding) – bass
- Rocky Gray (Soul Embraced, Living Sacrifice) – drums
- The Wedding – gang vocals
- Caleb Cox – uilleann pipes
- Tim Garrison – mandolin
- Garrett Viggers – hammer dulcimer

Production

- Steve Blackmon – Digital Editing, Engineer, Mixing
- Jordan Butcher – Layout Design
- Jeremiah Scott – Digital Editing
- Steve Wilson – Digital Editing, Engineer, Mastering, Producer, Vocals (Background)

== Charts ==
Chart (2012)	Peak position
US Billboard 200	127
US Christian Albums (Billboard)	4
US Top Hard Rock Albums (Billboard)	7
US Independent Albums (Billboard)	18
US Top Rock Albums (Billboard)	38
