= Omni, Pt. 1 =

Studio album by Project 86
- Released: March 24, 2023
- Genres: Metalcore, industrial metal, nu metalcore
- Length: 51:04
- Label: Spaceuntravel
- Producers: Beau Burchell; Matt Putman; Michael Palmquist

Project 86 chronology
Sheep Among Wolves (2017)	Omni, Pt. 1 (2023)	Omni, Pt. 2 (2024)

Singles from Omni, Pt. 1
- 1. "Metatropolis" Released: December 15, 2022; 2. "0 > 1" Released: January 20, 2023; 3. "Virtual Signal" Released: February 24, 2023

Omni, Pt. 1 is the eleventh studio album by Christian rock band Project 86, intended as the first part of a double album. It was released on March 24, 2023, and was produced by Beau Burchell (Saosin), Matt Putman and Michael Palmquist. Palmquist, Matt Marquez, Grayson Stewart and Cory Brandan, all from Norma Jean, helped write and perform on the album. The album is a radical departure from the band's established sound, with the style being that of modern metalcore and Andrew Schwab employing death growls as opposed to his usual talk-yelling.

== Background ==
In 2021, the band announced that their next album would be their final album, along with a Crowdfunding campaign with a goal of $60,000. More than a year later, when their goal was met, they released the first single, "Metatropolis", on December 15, 2022., and then the second single "0 > 1" with the tracklist and announcement that the album would be two parts. After the third single ("Virtual Signal") was dropped, the first part released on March 24, 2023.

"The writing process involved quite a bit of travel and collaboration," said Andrew Schwab in an interview with Sound In The Signals, "as I definitely wanted to craft a specific sound for this release. To be honest, I had a hankering to take the sound of the band in a heavier direction for a very long time, really, since Drawing Black Lines was released. This time, I had to pull out every stop to assemble the right team to make that happen. All in all, I made seven or eight trips to everywhere from Nashville to Springfield to Ft. Smith to Temecula to bring it all together."

== Premise ==
Omni is a concept album, drawn from multiple sources such as Blade Runner, 1984, and Atlas Shrugged. "The lyrics are visual and narrative in nature," Schwab explains, "exploring a fictitious world in the not-so-distant future that projects forward our current reality, especially as it relates to technology. It explores the idea of transhumanism in a world where a singular “Big Tech” power dictates most of reality. What would happen if mankind invented a way to cheat death? That’s the question we try to wrestle with on this release."

== Synopsis ==
In the year 2041, humanity has reached a point where technology is now so advanced it can eliminate even death. A massively powerful corporation called Omni—led by an influential businessman/dictator named Alexander Ophis—has asserted dominance over the whole world via three life-altering innovations: The Pulse: An mRNA genetic implant which has the power to regulate human emotion through algorithms; The Optic: an ocular/neural interface which supplants smartphones, allowing users to see virtual artifacts in their natural field of vision, introducing augmented and virtual reality into the physical world; and Organic Fission: a 100% sustainable energy source which gains its said energy from “organic sources” (humans in stasis who are disintegrated via atomic properties). The corporation boasts of the obsoleteness of religion and God in its technological pioneering. Ophis announces the launch event for The Augment, which is the technology which will finally allow mankind to merge with AI and render themselves immortal. The event is slated to take place at Omni City (formerly Ankara, Turkey) at Omni Tower: a massive, 3 km spire which is humanity’s greatest architectural achievement.

Unbeknownst to the public, Omni Corporation has engineered the singularity, and all its innovations, with the help of extraterrestrial entities. The announcement of the Augment and its accompanying festival is met with high praise and elegant celebration. But, as the event proceeds, the extraterrestrials influence everyone's minds, instigating violent emotions. Without the fear of death, the true, dark nature of man emerges in the event; violence and anarchy eventually erupts in the formerly stately party, with the attendees and elite slaughtering one another. The climax culminates with Ophis (whose intentions are to not only eliminate death but God as well) inviting the malicious AI (extraterrestrial) who has been helping him, named Tartarus, into his body, setting off a chain-reaction of the extraterrestrials' emergence, with the tower becoming sentient and killing the remaining attendees. After having supposedly been silenced, God intervenes and summons a massive meteor shower upon the tower, destroying it, the populace and the entirety of Omni City.

== Critical reception ==
Professional ratings
Review scores
Source	Rating
Front Row Report	9/10
Jesus Freak Hideout	4.5/5 stars

The album received positive reviews from critics and fans, with praise for the change in genre and the album concept, and with many claiming it to be their best album. Michael Weaver for Jesus Freak Hideout said, "Omni (Part 1) is undoubtedly the heaviest collection of songs that Schwab and Project 86 have ever released. Sure, the band has had some heavy moments like 'Sincerely, Ichabod' or 'SOTS', but a large portion of Omni boarders on metalcore (and even djent), more than standard hard rock—the album is a bit of a grower as you adjust to the stylistic changes (there are times you don't even recognize Schwab's vocals as he is using a more metal sounding growl over his typical scream-singing) and the concept/story itself, but after a few listens, the album really starts clicking—I can't say where Omni will fit in with the ten other P86 albums, but it certainly stands out in a lot of ways. This one has the potential to bring some older fans back into the fray and even make some newer fans with this much heavier approach. Project 86 will be missed, but this is a fitting [start to their] farewell."

Metal Injection didn't post an official rating for Omni, but praised the album, comparing the band's genre shift to that of Code Orange. New Release Today said of the album, "The musicianship is tight and as pounding as it's always been, but the signature post-hardcore influence is nearly gone, with metalcore taking over. The new style features chuggy guitars, new vocal styles, and double-bass at times. It's not relentless, though, as there are some transition tracks which are less songs and more of concept album supplements. Overall, it sounds apocalyptic, as the concept is meant to be. Omni will be the most unique and metalcore-influenced record of Project 86's career. This double record will go down in heavy music scene history as one of the best final albums for a band. It is a difficult task to create something different yet familiar that will intrigue and impress fans, and Project 86 have nailed it."

Front Row Report said of the album, "Project 86 has always loved to push musical boundaries, but on Omni, Pt. 1, they take that to new extremes. On songs like 'Skinjob', and 'Metatropolis', the band deals with very familiar metalcore/post-hardcore/djent territory. The Sikth-esque pre-chorus and dive-bombing guitars in “Skinjob” and the growling guitars during 'Metatropolis' show that this band still knows how to push boundaries in the heavier end of their sound—There is no doubt that Project 86 still have a lot to say before they call it a career. Omni, Pt. 1 is a fantastic opening to their final chapter as a band."

== Track listing ==
All lyrics are written by Andrew Schwab, Cory Brandan and Grayson Stewart; all music is composed by Andrew Schwab, Matt Putman and Grayson Stewart.

Omni, Pt. 1 track listing
No.	Title	Length
1.	"Apotheosis"	4:19
2.	"Virtual Signal"	3:23
3.	"0 > 1"	5:25
4.	"User Agreement" (interlude)	2:31
5.	"When the Belfry Speaks"	4:59
6.	"Metatropolis"	4:58
7.	"Trust the Science" (interlude)	3:18
8.	"Tartarus Kiss"	2:44
9.	"Skinjob" (featuring Cory Brandan of Norma Jean)	4:51
10.	"Icarus/Prometheus" (interlude)	3:08
11.	"Spoon Walker"	6:41
12.	"Tears in Reign"	4:59
Total length:		51:04

== Personnel ==
Project 86

- Andrew Schwab – vocals
- Matt Marquez – drums
- Darren King – rhythm guitar, production, engineering
- Michael Palmquist – lead guitar, production, engineering
- Grayson Stewart – bass

Additional personnel

- Cory Brandan – guest vocals on track 9, additional production
- Beau Burchell – production, mixing, mastering
- Matt Putman – production, engineering
- Don Phüry – album artwork, design
