= Bloodshed (band) =

American Christian hardcore band

- Also known as: Slingshot David
- Origin: Southern California
- Genres: Christian hardcore, hardcore punk, post-hardcore, emo
- Years active: 1992–1997, 2018–present
- Labels: Solid State, Tooth & Nail
- Past members: Jason Fleetwood; Sean Stopnik; Jonathan Caro; Justice Gulmatico; John Kittrell; Timothy Clark; Kevin Chen; Steven Dail

Bloodshed is a Christian hardcore band established in the early 1990s. The band released a demo in 1993 and two EPs through Solid State Records. It was established in 1992 with the original lineup of Jason Fleetwood, Sean Stopnik, Jonathan Caro, Justice Gulmatico, and John Kittrell. In 1997, the band changed their name to Slingshot David, but disbanded six months later.

== History ==
Bloodshed began in 1992 with the lineup of Jason Fleetwood, Jonathan Caro, Sean Stopnik, John Kittrell, and Justice Gulmatico. In 1993, the band released a demo which caught the attention of local bands such as Unashamed and Outnumbered, who relayed it to Tooth & Nail Records. In 1995, the band released their debut EP, Bloodshed through Tooth & Nail. Following its release, however, John Kittrell departed from the band, which also affected their relationship with the label.

After Kittrell's departure, Kevin Chen joined the band as a guitarist. With Chen in the band, they recorded their second EP, The Soft Spoken Words of Fallbrook, which came out via Tooth & Nail. Around 1996 and 1997, the band switched names to Slingshot David, attempting to channel music more along the lines of Fugazi. Chen and Fleetwood departed from the band, with their spots being filled by Steven Dail and Timothy Clark, both of Innermeans.

In 2019, Caro stated that the band was going to record the full-length they had planned with the tentative lineup of Caro, Fleetwood, and Gulmatico. A new band, Clean Fortress, has been started as a continuation of Bloodshed.

== Members ==
Current lineup

- Jason Fleetwood - vocals (1992–1997, 2018–present)
- Johnathan Caro - bass, backing vocals (1992–1997, 2018–present) (ex-Stairwell, B is Bridgie, My Compatriots)
- Justice Gulmatico - drums (1992–1997, 2018–present)) (My Compatriots)

Former

- Timothy Clark - vocals (1997) (ex-Innermeans)
- Sean Stopnik - guitar (1992–1997) (ex-Innermeans, ex-Stairwell, ex-Rock Kills Kid)
- John Kittrell - guitar (1992–1996)
- Kevin Chen - guitar (1996–1997) (ex-The OC Supertones, ex-Impact)
- Steven Dail - guitar (1997) (ex-Project 86, ex-Innermeans, White Lighter)

Timeline

== Discography ==
Demos

- Demo 1993 (1993)

EPs

- Bloodshed (1995)
- The Soft Spoken Words of Fallbrook (1996)
