= The Overseer =

American Christian metal band

- Origin: Bentonville, Arkansas, U.S.
- Genres: Christian metal, Christian rock, experimental rock, hard rock, metalcore
- Years active: 2007–present
- Labels: Solid State
- Members: Anthony Rivera; Darren King; Bradley Riggs; Abishai Collingsworth
- Website: facebook.com/theoverseerband

The Overseer is a Christian metal band from Bentonville, Arkansas started in 2007. They released an independent EP in 2010 entitled The Overseer, and two successive studio albums with their label Solid State Records entitled We Search, We Dig (2012) and Rest and Let Go (2014).

== Background ==
The band started in 2007, is from Bentonville, Arkansas.

== Music ==
In January 2012, the band signed to their label Solid State Records.

=== Independent albums ===
The band released their eponymously titled independent album in 2010 The Overseer.

=== Studio albums ===
The band released their debut studio album We Search, We Dig on June 19, 2012, with Solid State. Their second studio LP entitled Rest and Let Go came out on March 4, 2014 again through Solid State. The album charted at Nos. 44 and 47 on the Billboard Christian Albums and Heatseeker Albums charts, for the week of March 22, 2014. The song entitled "Fragile Wings" peaked at No. 14 on the Christian Rock chart for the week of April 19, 2014.

=== Side Projects ===
Darren King was playing guitar in the new album of the Christian alternative metal band, Project 86, Knives to the Future and became an official member soon after.

Abishai Collingsworth played live for a Christian death metal band, Becoming the Archetype, and is currently playing with the Christian post-hardcore band, Wolves at the Gate.

Bradley Riggs also performed live with Becoming the Archetype with Abishai Collingsworth.

Anthony Rivera used to perform Vocals for the Christian Hardcore band, Here I Come Falling and drums for Letlive and The Ghost Inside.

== Members ==
=== Current members ===
- Anthony Rivera – lead vocals (formerly of Here I Come Falling, The Ghost Inside, and Letlive)
- Darren King – guitar, backing vocals (currently in Project 86)
- Bradley Riggs – bass guitar (formerly a live musician with Becoming the Archetype)
- Abishai Collingsworth - drums (formerly a live musician with Becoming the Archetype, currently in Wolves at the Gate)

=== Former members ===
- Billiam - guitar
- Taylor Yokem - vocals

== Discography ==
=== Studio albums ===
List of studio albums, with selected chart positions
Title	Album details	Peak chart positions	
Title	Album details	US CHR	US HEAT
We Search, We Dig	Released: June 19, 2012; Label: Solid State; CD, digital download	—	—
Rest and Let Go	Released: March 4, 2014; Label: Solid State; CD, digital download	44	47
