= Rival Factions =

Studio album by Project 86
- Released: June 19, 2007
- Studio: Eric Kretz's Bomb Shelter Studios, Los Angeles
- Length: 34:55
- Label: Tooth & Nail
- Producer: Ulrich Wild

Project 86 chronology
| ...And the Rest Will Follow (2005) | Rival Factions (2007) | The Kane Mutiny EP (2007) |

Professional ratings
Review scores
| Source | Rating |
|---|---|
| AllMusic | 4/5 stars |
| Alternative Press | 3.5/5 stars |
| CCM Magazine | (positive) |
| Christianity Today | 4/5 stars |
| Cross Rhythms | 7/10 stars |
| HM | (positive) |
| Jesus Freak Hideout | 4.5/5 stars |

Rival Factions is the sixth studio album by Project 86. The album peaked at No. 124 on the Billboard 200 and at No. 5 on Billboard's Top Christian Albums. This album is their first without previous drummer Alex Albert, with Jason Gerken from Shiner and Open Hand playing drums. Although originally scheduled for release on June 5, 2007, the release was pushed back to June 19.

"The Kane Mutiny", a track that was mentioned in some early track listings for the album, was announced to be part of the iTunes download, as a bonus. Shortly thereafter, Project 86 announced that they were investigating ways to make the track available to all those who had pre-ordered the album, and in a few weeks had made it available on their MySpace page. It was later announced on August 23, 2007 that it was to be the title track of The Kane Mutiny EP, released on November 27.

== Accolades ==
In 2008, the album was nominated for a Dove Award for Recorded Music Packaging of the Year at the 39th GMA Dove Awards.

== Track listing ==
1. "Evil (A Chorus of Resistance)" – 3:03
2. "Put Your Lips to the TV" – 2:49
3. "The Forces of Radio Have Dropped a Viper into the Rhythm Section" – 2:51
4. "Molotov" – 3:12
5. "Slaves to Liberty" – 3:02
6. "Pull Me Closer, Violent Dancer" – 3:56
7. "Illuminate" – 2:40
8. "The Sanctuary Hum" – 5:01
9. "Caveman Jam" – 3:18
10. "Normandy" – 5:03

=== iTunes bonus track ===
1. "The Kane Mutiny" – 3:26

== Personnel ==
- Andrew Schwab – vocals
- Randy Torres – guitar, keyboards, background vocals, percussion
- Steven Dail – bass, keyboards, background vocals
- Jason Gerken – drums

Production

- Ulrich Wild – producer, engineering, mixing
- Troy Gelssner – mastering
- Don Clark (musician) – design
- Jerad Kundson – photography
- Shane McCauley – photography
- Jeff Carver – A&R
- Brandon Ebel – executive producer
