= Project 86 (album) =

Studio album by Project 86
- Released: June 16, 1998
- Recorded: 1998
- Studio: Eldorado Studios (Burbank, California)
- Genre: Nu metal
- Length: 48:33
- Label: BEC
- Producer: Bryan Carlstrom, Project 86

Project 86 chronology
Project 86 (1998)	Drawing Black Lines (2000)

Singles from Project 86
- 1. "Pipe Dream" Released: 1998

Professional ratings
Review scores
Source	Rating
AllMusic	link
HM Magazine	1998
7ball	
YouthWorker	
CBA Marketplace	
Jesus Freak Hideout	3.5/5 stars

Project 86 is the debut album of the American band Project 86. It was released on June 16, 1998 on BEC Recordings, the Christian imprint of Tooth & Nail Records. This album established Project 86 as one of the more promising hardcore/metal groups in the Christian music scene. According to one critic, Project 86 became "one of the few Christian acts to gain exposure to the general market" by the turn of the millennium. The album sold over 30,000 copies before the release of the band's second album in the year 2000.

== Style and content ==
Project 86 features a rap styled vocal delivery over hard-edged, downtuned guitars. While the music itself was not heavily influenced by hip hop, vocalist Andrew Schwab was a fan of the East Coast hip hop scene. Partly due to this influence, and the popularity of rapcore at the time of this album's release, many reviewers classified the album with that genre. Others saw the prominent influence of other hard music genres such as hardcore, metal, and speed punk.

Their music, which was said to "take passion and intensity to a unique level," was matched with a "gloomy lyrical perspective." The closing cut, "When Darkness Reigns," exemplifies the form, which one reviewer called a "climate of pitch black darkness." Christian reviewers noted that this was introspection, one stating that the lyrics deal with "wrestling with the inner man and life core issues." Themes of apathy, guilt, and oppression appear on the album; one reviewer described these as the vocalist as wearing his "wounded heart on his ragged sleeve." For his part, Schwab states, "there were a lot of things that I was going through, personal struggles, life issues." The same reviewer went on to state that the album wasn't really dark, but "merely honest."

The music video for their song "Pipe Dream" received rotation on The Box and later MTV2. The album features Sonny Sandoval of P.O.D. on "Six Sirens". Frontman Andrew Schwab stated that P.O.D. was an influence and of all Christian bands the one he most respected. "The Warriors Tour" later featured P.O.D., Project 86, and Blindside.

As for rapcore, the band maintains that it was never their intention to become associated with the genre. "You wouldn't call Beck a rapper, even though he raps," Schwab once told an interviewer. Guitarist Randy Torres echoed the sentiment, stating, "I feel the new wave of rapcore is both predictable and boring" in a year 2000 interview. Their follow up effort, Drawing Black Lines, followed and expanded upon the style of "Pipe Dream" most closely.

Originally released for a generic Christian compilation titled Moms Like Us Too Vol. 1 (Tooth & Nail, 1999), there is a separate track titled "Numb" that is sometimes cited as the 11th track on the B-side of this album. Due to album production dates and its musical similarity to the debut disc, "Numb" was most likely recorded at the same time, but not included in the main release. In Drawing Black Lines, the final song titled "Twenty-Three" is most likely named because, with the inclusion of "Numb", it is the 23rd track released by the band.

Project 86 eschewed the label of being a Christian band from the beginning, hoping to avoid stereotyping associated with the genre. In an interview for HM magazine the band stated that many "Christian bands" bill themselves as such because it is easier to make a successful start in that market. Andrew Schwab continued, "One thing we want to do is to be ourselves... were coming at it with more of a creative outlet lyrically. I don't always say specifically what I'm talking about." Even so, the band considers their work to be a ministry. Project 86 seeks to "put out the best art possible" in the hopes of reaching out to the secular world. "If we're playing at Ozzfest or on Family Values...," the band told 7ball after the release of their second album, "there is a greater level of tact necessary in order to reach that sort of audience."

== Track listing ==
All songs were written by Project 86.

1. "Spill Me" – 5:25
2. "Rebuttal" – 4:47
3. "Pipe Dream" – 4:35
4. "Stalemate" – 6:16
5. "Run" – 3:37
6. "Independence?" – 4:27
7. "Six Sirens (ft. Sonny Sandoval of P.O.D.)" – 3:35
8. "Bleed Season" – 5:16
9. "1 X 7" – 3:55
10. "When Darkness Reigns" – 6:40

Separate Release Track: "Numb" – 5:40

== Personnel ==
- Andrew Schwab – vocals
- Randy Torres – guitar
- Steven Dail – bass
- Alex Albert – drums
- Sonny Sandoval – guest vocals
- Bryan Carlstrom – producer, engineer
- Brian Gardner – mastering
- Project 86 – producer, art direction
- Jason Parker – art direction, layout
- Suzy Splab – artwork
- Tim Owen – photography
