= Picket Fence Cartel =

Studio album by Project 86
- Released: July 14, 2009
- Studio: Sound Dub Asylum, Orange County, California
- Genre: Post-hardcore, alternative metal
- Length: 39:56
- Label: Tooth & Nail
- Producer: Project 86, Ulrich Wild

Project 86 chronology
This Time of Year EP (2008)	Picket Fence Cartel (2009)	Wait for the Siren (2012)

Professional ratings
Review scores
Source	Rating
allmusic	4/5 stars
Christianity Today	4/5 stars
Jesus Freak Hideout	4.5/5 stars

Picket Fence Cartel is the seventh studio album by Project 86. It was released on July 14, 2009 through Tooth & Nail Records.

The sound for the album has been described as "heavier", as Andrew Schwab mentioned on a MySpace blog that fans who favor the "heavy" sound will be pleased. The album was also released on 12" vinyl through Tooth & Nail Records. Only 500 copies of the LP were pressed and released. The "Picket Fence Cartel" LP is considered a major collector's item and was the first of the band's albums to be released on vinyl.

The album allegedly featured Randy Torres on guitars and piano, however Torres stated that he did not play on the record. The drummer of the album is also uncredited on the release.

== Track listing ==
All tracks are written by Project 86.

No.	Title	Length
1.	"Destroyer"	4:49
2.	"The Butcher"	3:02
3.	"The Spectacle of Fearsome Acts"	3:12
4.	"Dark Angel Dragnet"	3:23
5.	"Cold and Calculated"	3:38
6.	"Cement Shoes"	3:56
7.	"A John Hancock with the Safety Off"	3:16
8.	"Two Glass Eyes"	3:28
9.	"Cyclonus"	3:46
10.	"The Black Brigade"	2:54
11.	"To Sand We Return"	4:35
Total length:		39:56

== Personnel ==
- Andrew Schwab – vocals
- Steven Dail – guitars, bass
- Jason Gerken – drums, percussion

Production

- Ulrich Wild – producer, mixing, engineering, mastering
