= ...And the Rest Will Follow =

2005 studio album by Project 86

Studio album by Project 86
- Released: September 27, 2005
- Recorded: 2005
- Studios: "The Armory, The Farm, and The Warehouse" (Vancouver, British Columbia)
- Length: 48:53
- Label: Tooth & Nail
- Producers: Ben Kaplan, GGGarth

Project 86 chronology
Songs to Burn Your Bridges By (2003)	...And the Rest Will Follow (2005)	Rival Factions (2007)

Professional ratings
Review scores
Source	Rating
AllMusic	4/5 stars
CCM	positive
Christianity Today	4/5 stars
Cross Rhythms	8/10 stars
Jesus Freak Hideout	4.5/5 stars

...And the Rest Will Follow is the fifth studio album by Project 86, released on September 27, 2005 by Tooth & Nail Records.

== Track listing ==
All tracks are written by Project 86.

No.	Title	Length
1.	"Sincerely, Ichabod"	4:22
2.	"All of Me"	3:59
3.	"Doomsday Stomp"	3:52
4.	"Something We Can't Be"	4:16
5.	"Subject to Change"	4:31
6.	"Necktie Remedy"	5:13
7.	"My Will Be a Dead Man"	4:35
8.	"From December"	4:48
9.	"The Hand, the Furnace, the Straight Face"	3:15
10.	"...And the Rest Will Follow"	2:17
11.	"Cavity King"	3:30
12.	"Wordsmith Legacy"	4:10

== Personnel ==
- Alex Albert – drums
- Ben Kaplan – programming, producer, engineer, mastering
- Kelly Kerr – photography
- Dean Maher – engineer
- Project 86 – producer
- Andrew Schwab – vocals
- Randy Torres – guitar, keyboards, programming, vocals
- Steven Dail – bass
- Josh Wilbur – mixing
