= My Brain Says Stop, But My Heart Says Go! =

Studio album by FM Static
- Released: April 5, 2011
- Recorded: 2010
- Genre: Pop punk, Christian rock
- Length: 33:59
- Label: Tooth & Nail
- Producer: Aaron Sprinkle, Trevor McNevan

FM Static chronology
| Dear Diary (2009) | My Brain Says Stop, But My Heart Says Go! (2011) |

Professional ratings
Review scores
| Source | Rating |
|---|---|
| Christian Music Zine | 4/5 stars |
| Jesusfreakhideout.com | 4/5 stars |

My Brain Says Stop, But My Heart Says Go!, is the fourth and final studio album by Canadian pop punk band FM Static. The album was released on April 5, 2011, through Tooth & Nail Records. The first two singles from the record are "F.M.S.T.A.T.I.C." and "Last Train Home".

== Track listing ==
All tracks are written by FM Static.

Album release
| No. | Title | Length |
|---|---|---|
| 1. | "My Brain Says Stop, But My Heart Says Go" | 3:02 |
| 2. | "F.M.S.T.A.T.I.C." | 3:52 |
| 3. | "(Hey) I Want It" | 3:07 |
| 4. | "Lost In You" | 3:42 |
| 5. | "U Don't Know Me Like That" | 2:42 |
| 6. | "Cinnamon & Lipstick" | 3:24 |
| 7. | "Black Tattoo" | 3:29 |
| 8. | "Last Train Home" | 3:34 |
| 9. | "Breaking Me Again" | 3:37 |
| 10. | "Inside Out" | 3:29 |
| Total length: | | 33:59 |

== Credits ==
Source - AllMusic

- Trevor McNevan - vocals, guitars, programming
- Steve Augustine - drums, percussion

Additional musicians

- Matt Carter - bass
- Aaron Sprinkle - additional guitars, keyboards, additional programming

Production

- Aaron Sprinkle - producer, engineering
- Brad Gillderman - mixing
- Troy Gelssner - mastering
- Brandon Ebel - executive producer
- Jeff Carver - A&R
- Ryan Clark - design
