= This Time of Year EP =

EP by Project 86
- Released: November 25, 2008
- Length: 16:26
- Label: Team Black

Project 86 chronology
The Kane Mutiny EP (2007)	This Time of Year EP (2008)	Picket Fence Cartel (2009)

Professional ratings
Review scores
Source	Rating
Jesus Freak Hideout	link

This Time of Year EP is the second EP by American Christian rock band Project 86. The release was first announced on September 23, 2008 through the band's official MySpace blog. Nine days later, the band released a further update naming the new release as This Time of Year, and specifying the release date as November 18, 2008. The release date was then changed to November 25, 2008. The EP contains four new songs, as well as a cover of the song, This Time of The Year, which was created for the Christmas season of 2007. The instrumental song "What Child?" uses elements from the traditional English folk song Greensleeves.

== Track listing ==
Album release
No.	Title	Length
1.	"This Time of the Year"	2:46
2.	"Wrought on This Holiday's Eve"	3:14
3.	"Shiny Skin"	3:46
4.	"Misfit Toys"	3:26
5.	"What Child?"	3:54
Total length:		16:26

== Credits ==
- Andrew Schwab - Vocals
- Randy Torres - Lead Guitar, Keyboards, Backing Vocals
- Steven Dail - Bass, Rhythm Guitar, Backing Vocals
- Jason Gerken - Drums
