= Sheep Among Wolves =

Studio album by Project 86
- Released: December 5, 2017
- Studio: DK Studios, Nashville, TN
- Genre: Christian rock, alternative rock, post-hardcore
- Label: Team Black Recordings
- Producer: Andrew Schwab, Darren King

Project 86 chronology
Knives to the Future (2014)	Sheep Among Wolves (2017)	OMNI, Pt. 1 (2023)

Singles from Sheep Among Wolves
- 1. "MHS" Released: November 10, 2017; 2. "By Constantine" Released: December 4, 2017

Sheep Among Wolves is the tenth studio album by Christian rock band Project 86. It features Abashai Collingsworth on drums and was self-produced by Andrew Schwab and Darren King. The album was issued in celebration of the band's 20-year anniversary.

== Critical reception ==
Professional ratings
Review scores
Source	Rating
Jesus Freak Hideout	4/5 stars
HM Magazine	4/5 stars
Indie Vision Music	4/5 stars
V13.net	(mixed)
Sputnikmusic	`

In their review for the album, Mark Rice of Jesus Freak Hideout said, "Personally, the biggest flaw I could find with Sheep is just how much songs like "Dead Man's Switch," "Imaginary Me," "Freebooter," and a few others reminded me of Knives to the Future, instead of being able to totally stand on its own. That's a relatively minor quibble, however. And there are certainly moments (most notably the title track, which to me was the album's biggest highlight) where we do get to hear them expand and experiment with their sound—this is certainly a project any Project 86 fan would want, and for those who aren't already fans, this 20th Anniversary celebration will make it easy to become one." HM Magazine said of the album, "Despite two decades releasing rock music, Project 86 hasn’t grown complacent, releasing albums for the sake of releasing albums. The band still has a purpose behind their art, and Sheep Among Wolves proves to be a heavier, deeper, and significant release." Indie Vision also praised the album, stating that "Sheep Among Wolves is a powerful album with poignant imagery that seeps into your soul through beautifully written lyrics which require multiple listens to fully grasp, yet the songs are sung in such a way that even a casual listen will bring the blood to your veins." V13.net was less enthusiastic, stating that "this latest release very much follows in the footsteps of their 2014 offering Knives to the Future. While this may be a good thing for long-time fans of the band, it’s doubtful there will be anything for anyone here from outside of the hard rock community. The hard-rock-offset-by-lighter melodies style of songwriting that has permeated the band’s discography is still in full effect, producing an album that doesn’t go past heated and wander into full on blazing intensity—However, if this level of engagement is what you are after, then this may be the album for you.". Sputnikmusic highly favored the album, calling it a "thoroughly-satisfying album from front-to-back. With excellent musicianship across the board from these extremely-talented gentlemen, Sheep Among Wolves stands out as one of the band's greatest accomplishments. A magnificently underappreciated record."

== Track listing ==
All lyrics are written by Project 86; all music is composed by Project 86.

No.	Title	Length
1.	"MHS"	2:49
2.	"Dead Man's Switch"	3:24
3.	"Imaginary Me"	2:50
4.	"Freebooter"	3:53
5.	"By Constantine"	3:44
6.	"Copper Wish"	4:12
7.	"Sheep Among Wolves"	3:57
8.	"Into Another"	2:33
9.	"The Great Escape"	3:47
10.	"Metempsychosis"	4:03
Total length:		35:12

== Personnel ==
Project 86

- Andrew Schwab – vocals, production, gang vocals
- Darren King – guitars, keyboards, bass, production, engineering, gang vocals
- Abashai Collingsworth – drums

Additional Personnel

- Jeremy Griffith – mixing
- Adam Thron – gang vocals
- Cody Driggers – gang vocals
