= Reflection (Unashamed album) =

Studio album by Unashamed
- Released: 1996
- Recorded: 1995–1996
- Genre: Christian hardcore, hardcore punk, metalcore
- Label: Tooth & Nail
- Producer: Bob Moon

Unashamed chronology
Silence (1994)	Reflection (1996)

Reflection is the second album by the Christian hardcore band, Unashamed and the first album to feature Drummer Jason Carson.

== Critical reception ==
The album received several reviews, including magazines, Heaven's Metal, now known as HM Magazine, Garlic Press, and Campus Life.

== Track listing ==
No.	Title	Length
1.	"Meet Us Here"	3:24
2.	"Strength Within"	3:13
3.	"This Dividing Wall"	1:53
4.	"What Will Become"	4:29
5.	"Reflection"	4:13
6.	"The Agony of Deceit"	4:56
7.	"Separated"	3:37
8.	"Turn"	3:53
9.	"Sustained"	4:37
10.	"Gateway"	4:11
11.	"Everlasting Father"	3:04
12.	"Awesome God"	9:23

== Personnel ==
Unashamed

- Jeff Jaquay - vocals
- Dan McManigal - guitar
- Bobby Canaday - guitar
- Matt Hernandez - bass
- Jason Carson - drums

Production

- Bob Moon - producer, engineer
- Brandon Ebel - executive producer
- Joe Foster - artwork
- Brian Gardner - mastering
- Aaron Warner - mixing assistant
- Brian White - sampling
- Matt Wignal - artwork
