= What Are You Waiting For? (FM Static album) =

Studio album by FM Static
- Released: July 22, 2003
- Genre: Pop punk
- Length: 39:52
- Label: Tooth & Nail
- Producer: Aaron Sprinkle

FM Static chronology
What Are You Waiting For? (2003)	Critically Ashamed (2006)

Professional ratings
Review scores
Source	Rating
AllMusic	3/5 stars
Jesusfreakhideout.com	4/5 stars
Cross Rhythms	9/10 squares

What Are You Waiting For? is the first studio album by the pop punk band FM Static, released July 22, 2003.

== Track listing ==
All tracks are written by FM Static except where noted.

Album release
No.	Title	Writer(s)	Length
1.	"Three Days Later"		2:23
2.	"Crazy Mary"	Steven Augustine	2:47
3.	"Something to Believe In"		2:49
4.	"Definitely Maybe"		2:50
5.	"Donna"		2:16
6.	"All the Days"		2:26
7.	"Hold Me Twice"		2:39
8.	"The Notion"		2:10
9.	"October"		2:50
10.	"My First Stereo"		6:32
11.	"Hey Now"		10:10
Total length:			39:52

== Personnel ==
- Trevor McNevan - vocals
- Steve Augustine - drums
- Justin Smith - bass
- John Bunner - guitars

Additional musicians

- Aaron Sprinkle - additional guitars

Production

- Aaron Sprinkle - producer, engineering, mastering
- Jr McNeely - mixing
