= Joby Harris =

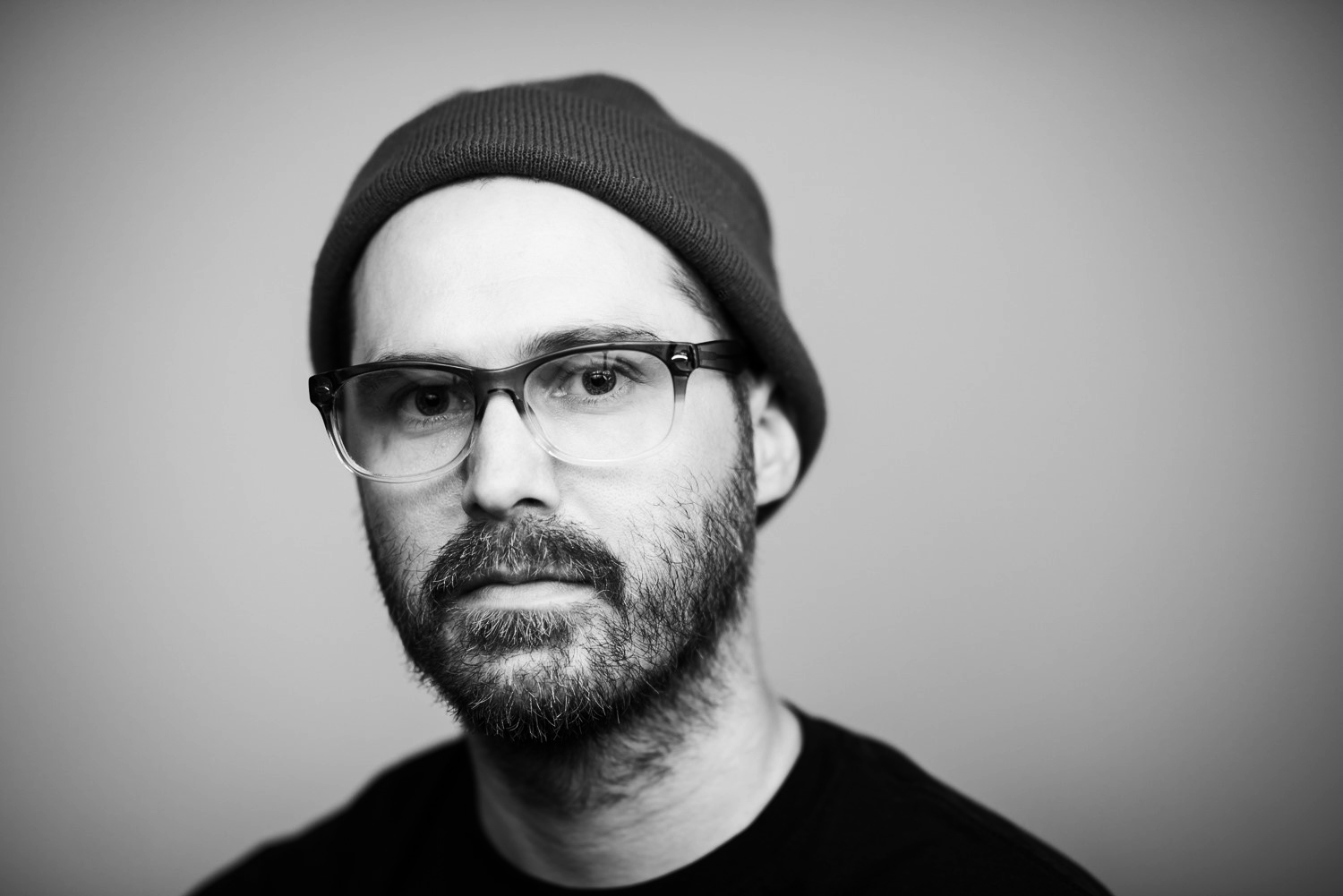

Background information
- Born: February 21, 1975 (age 51)
- Origin: Saxonburg, Pennsylvania
- Occupations: Creative director, artist, filmmaker, musician
- Website: jobyharris.com

Joby Harris (born February 21, 1975) is a designer and director in Los Angeles, California. He is also the lead singer and guitar player for the American post-hardcore band Crash Rickshaw.

== Music ==
According to a March 16, 2025, Spin magazine article, Harris first performed in a local Pittsburgh, Pennsylvania punk band called PHATSO while attending art school. The band submitted a demo to Seattle-based Tooth & Nail Records, which included one of their songs on a punk compilation album, providing the group with its first national exposure. Harris left the band after accepting a position at Walt Disney Imagineering in California. After relocating to Southern California, Harris became active in the Orange County punk, hardcore, emo and ska music scene. He later joined and performed with the bands Rainy Days and The Moodswingers, opening for acts including At the Drive In. In 2000, Project 86 members Stephen Dale, Alex Albert and Randy Torres invited Harris to form a side project inspired by their mutual interests in bands such as Fugazi and Drive Like Jehu. The group, Crash Rickshaw signed with Tooth & Nail Records after label owner Brandon Ebel heard their two-song demo on a cassette. The band subsequently recorded its debut album at Eldorado Recording Studios in Burbank, California with producer Bryan Jerden.

Crash Rickshaw have two albums to date: A self-titled album on Tooth & Nail Records in late 2001 and a second album entitled Big Sir released on August 1, 2025 by Huntington Beach, California indie label Velvet Blue Music.

== Directing ==
In December 2011, Harris became a finalist in the Doritos Crash the Super Bowl commercial contest. His commercial "Bird of Prey" airs on television in the United States and Canada.

Harris co-directed the 2013 short film Turnipseed: Second Chances, and Directed the 3rd installment Turnipseed: Legacy produced by Five Stone Media. The films star Lawrence Gilliard Jr. of The Wire as John Turnipseed, a former Minneapolis gang leader whose life was transformed following years of violence and incarceration. Based on Turnipseed's life, the film was developed as part of Five Stone Media's educational curriculum and has been used in prison rehabilitation programs throughout the United States.

== JPL and NASA Visual Strategist ==
For 13 years, Harris worked as a visual strategist, illustrator, graphic designer and video creator for JPL and NASA supporting programs and missions such as Mars Perseverance, Mars Insight, Europa Clipper, Voyager 1 & 2, Cassini (Saturn), Juno (Jupiter), NASA Universe Exoplanet programs as well as Earth and Lunar Mission programs.

In 2015, Harris illustrated several vintage-style travel posters showing terrestrial getaways to other planets, moons and exoplanets such as Kepler-186f, HD 40307 g and Kepler-16b entitled "Visions of the Future". The posters received international attention in major news outlets, television shows such as The Big Bang Theory, and Marvel's Runaways.

In 2020, he served as an Art Director for NASA's Mars 2020 Perseverance Rover and Ingenuity Helicopter missions, leading the creation of graphics, illustrations, data visualizations, branding, and digital media supporting news, public engagement, mission milestones, launch, and landing.

In December 2024, Harris created a video of his cat "Taters" chasing a laser beam amidst technical graphics pertaining to light communication. The video was uploaded to an instrument aboard the Psyche spacecraft and launched into space where it was beamed back to Earth as part of a technological test called the Deep Space Optical Communications. The demo transmitted the 15-second test video via a cutting-edge instrument called a flight laser transceiver. The video signal took 101 seconds to reach Earth, sent at the system’s maximum bit rate of 267 megabits per second (Mbps). The video was a nod to the first television test broadcast in 1928 starring Felix the Cat.

== Discography ==
With Crash Rickshaw

- Big Sir (2025)
- Crash Rickshaw (2001)
