= Critically Ashamed =

Studio album by FM Static
- Released: August 1, 2006
- Genre: Pop punk, Christian rock
- Length: 33:52
- Label: Tooth & Nail
- Producer: Trevor McNevan, Steve Augustine

FM Static chronology
What Are You Waiting For? (2003)	Critically Ashamed (2006)	Dear Diary (2009)

Professional ratings
Review scores
Source	Rating
Cross Rhythms	8/10 squares
Jesusfreakhideout.com	3.5/5 stars
Ultimate-Guitar	9/10 stars

Critically Ashamed is the second studio album by the Christian pop punk band FM Static, released August 1, 2006.

== Track listing ==
All tracks are written by FM Static.

Album release
No.	Title	Length
1.	"Hope the Rock Show Goes Good"	0:08
2.	"Flop Culture"	3:41
3.	"Six Candles"	4:15
4.	"The Next Big Thing"	3:33
5.	"America's Next Freak"	3:31
6.	"Tonight"	3:38
7.	"The Video Store"	3:20
8.	"Girl of the Year"	3:04
9.	"Nice Piece of Art"	3:33
10.	"What It Feels Like"	2:48
11.	"Waste of Time"	2:51
12.	"Moment of Truth"	3:46
Total length:		33:52

== Personnel ==
- Trevor McNevan – vocals, guitar, guitar recording, art direction
- Steve Augustine – drums
- FM Static – producer, additional engineering
- Mike Noack at Swordfish Digital Audio – engineering
- Zack Hodges at Electrokitty – engineering
- JR McNeely – mixing
- Brian Gardner at Bernie Grundman Mastering – mastering
- Aaron Powell – guitar recording
- Randy Torres – guitar recording
- Emmanuel Brown – bass guitar recording
- Mike Noack – keyboards
- Jamie K – additional guitars and engineering on "Six Candles"
- Brandon Ebel – A&R
- Jeff Carver – A&R
- Jason Powers – design
- Dave Hill – photography

== Charts ==
Chart (2006)	Peak position
US Christian Albums	38
US Heatseeker Albums	16
