= We Search, We Dig =

Studio album by The Overseer
- Released: June 19, 2012
- Genre: Christian metal, experimental rock, metalcore
- Length: 30:17
- Label: Solid State
- Producer: Matt McClellan

The Overseer chronology
The Overseer (2010)	We Search, We Dig (2012)	Rest and Let Go (2014)

We Search, We Dig is the debut studio album from Christian metal band The Overseer, and it was released on June 19, 2012 by Solid State Records. The album received positive criticism.

== Critical reception ==
Professional ratings
Review scores
Source	Rating
Christian Music Zine	4.75/5
Cross Rhythms	5/10 squares
HM	4/5 stars
Indie Vision Music	4/5 stars
Jesus Freak Hideout	4.5/5 stars
Mind Equal Blown	8.5/10

We Search, We Dig garnered positive reception from six music critics ratings and review. At Jesus Freak Hideout, Wayne Reimer rated it four-and-a-half stars, stating that the bands "musicality is especially impressive". At HM, Charlie Steffens rated it four stars, writing that it is "Good Stuff" with "No Fluff." At Indie Vision Music, Brody B rated it four stars, saying it is an "incredibly solid debut." Jake Lipman of Christian Music Zine rated it 4.75-out-of-five, stating that "If anyone enjoys a mix of heavy and atmospheric music then this is the album for you." At Mind Equals Blow, Tim Dodderidge rated it 8.5-out-of-ten, writing that the release "definitely makes a good impression". At Cross Rhythms, Graeme Crawford rated it five out of ten squares, saying that "Unfortunately, they are nowhere near the levels of those bands and in truth end up falling into the same pool of mediocrity of many other metalcore wannabes" because "Their songwriting is too simple and lacking in imagination."

== Track listing ==
All tracks are written by The Overseer.

Tracklist
No.	Title	Length
1.	"Secrets"	2:58
2.	"Dredge"	2:37
3.	"Amend"	4:47
4.	"Dreamer"	2:41
5.	"Mendacious"	2:05
6.	"Traitor"	2:41
7.	"Vulture"	2:52
8.	"Lost"	2:42
9.	"Estrange"	3:16
10.	"Absolve"	3:38
Total length:		30:17

== Credits ==
- Anthony Rivera - vocals
- Darren King - guitar, backing vocals
- Bradley Riggs - bass
- Abishai Collinngsworth - drums

Production

- Matt McClellan - producer, mixing
- Jerrod Naff - engineering
- Brandon Ebel - exucutive producer
- Ryan Clark - design
- Invisible Creatures - art direction
- Adam Skatuala - A&R
