= Truthless Heroes =

Studio album by Project 86
- Released: September 24, 2002
- Studio: Cello Studios and Grandmaster Recording, Hollywood, California
- Genre: Hard rock,nu metal
- Length: 55:33
- Label: Tooth & Nail, Atlantic
- Producer: Matt Hyde

Project 86 chronology
Drawing Black Lines (2000)	Truthless Heroes (2002)	Songs to Burn Your Bridges By (2003)

Singles from Truthless Heroes
- 1. "Hollow Again" Released: December 3, 2002

Professional ratings
Review scores
Source	Rating
AllMusic	4/5 stars
CCM Magazine	(positive)
Christianity Today	3.5/5 stars
Cross Rhythms	7/10 stars
Jesus Freak Hideout	4/5 stars

Truthless Heroes is the third studio album released by the American metal band Project 86. It was released on September 24, 2002 on Tooth & Nail Records and Atlantic Records, and debuted at number 146 on the Billboard Top 200, with over 7,000 copies sold.

Truthless Heroes is a concept album that frontman Andrew Schwab states "takes you through the protagonist's attempts to gratify himself and fill his deepest needs as a person through fame, fortune, lust, whatever."

== Track list ==
1. "Little Green Men" – 3:25
2. "Caught in the Middle" – 3:33
3. "Know What It Means" – 4:16
4. "Salem's Suburbs" – 3:38
5. "...A Word from Our Sponsors" – 0:44
6. "S.M.C." – 2:49
7. "Team Black" – 3:26
8. "Your Heroes Are Dead" – 3:55
9. "...To Brighten Your Day" – 1:12
10. "Another Boredom Movement" – 3:56
11. "Bottom Feeder" (featuring Holland Greco of The Peak Show) – 5:13
12. "Shelter Me Mercury" – 3:09
13. "...And Help You Sleep" – 1:44
14. "Last Meal" (featuring Mark Salomon of Stavesacre and The Crucified) – 3:51
15. "Soma" – 4:12
16. "Hollow Again" – 4:31
17. "...With Regards, T.H." – 1:59

== Personnel ==
Project 86

- Andrew Schwab - vocals
- Randy Torres - guitar, keyboards, backing vocals, co lead vocals
- Steven Dail - bass, backing vocals
- Alex Albert - drums

Additional musicians

- Holland Greco - guest vocals on "Bottom Feeder"
- Mark Salomon - guest vocals on "Last Meal"

== Chart performance ==
=== Weekly charts ===
Chart (2002/2003)	Peak position
US Billboard 200	146
US Heatseekers	4
US Christian Albums	9

=== Singles ===
Single	Peak Positions
Single	US Main.
"Hollow Again"	35
