= Omni, Pt. 2 =

Studio album by Project 86
- Released: January 12, 2024
- Genres: Metalcore, industrial metal, nu metalcore
- Length: 45:09
- Label: Spaceuntravel
- Producers: Matt Putman; Michael Palmquist; Darren King

Project 86 chronology
Omni, Pt. 1 (2023)	Omni, Pt. 2 (2024)

Singles from Omni, Pt. 2
- 1. "Ultraviolent" Released: December 1, 2023; 2. "Pariah" Released: January 12, 2024

Omni, Pt. 2 is the twelfth studio album by Christian rock band Project 86. It was released on January 12, 2024, and was produced by Matt Putman and Michael Palmquist. It is the second part to 2023's Omni, and as such continues the new metalcore approach begun on that album.

== Background ==
In 2021, the band announced that their next album would be their final album, along with a crowdfunding campaign with a goal of $60,000. More than a year later, when their goal was met, they released the first single for Omni, "Metatropolis", on December 15, 2022. The second single, "0 > 1", was accompanied by the track list and announcement that the album would be two parts.

Pt. 2 was initially announced for the fall of 2023, but the first single for the album, "Ultraviolent", did not release until December 1 of that year. The album was then announced to be released on March 1, 2024, but was moved earlier to January 12, 2024. In conjunction with the album's release, the second single "Pariah" was released with its music video.

Despite Omni being originally intended as the finale of Project 86, Andrew Schwab in an interview with Heaven's Metal magazine suggested that that would not quite be the case. Explaining the initial announcement of the band's retirement, Schwab said:

"With each successive record it had become increasingly difficult for us to come up with new ideas, while being chased by the high bar of our early history. It just no longer felt free, fun, or exciting. I knew it had to be destroyed in some form, I just didn't know what that would look like when I announced it. I had no plan, but I knew I had a passion to set fire to the name. What I realized through making OMNI was that the last Project 86 record was Sheep Among Wolves, our 2017 release, the 10th Project 86 album. The new record is the start of something wholly new – P86:OMNI. Maybe that statement sounds like semantics, but for me it represents a fresh start. For lack of a better way to put it, Project 86 made post-hardcore/rock, and P86:OMNI makes cyberpunk metal set in the Omniverse."

== Premise ==
Narratively, Omni, Pt. 2 is a prequel to Pt. 1, detailing the rise of Omni Corporation and its hold on the world. "The story is told through the eyes of a high-level employee of Omni," said Schwab, "the big-tech company which becomes a technocracy in 2041. It's a bit of a projection of what-if scenarios, based upon the current trajectory of AI. What would happen if the transhumanism dream became reality? What would the world look like if the virtual and physical realms completely merged? And, most importantly, what would happen if a big tech company could engineer perpetual life for all through creating a new iteration of our species?"

== Critical reception ==
Professional ratings
Review scores
Source	Rating
MetalSucks	4.5/5 stars

MetalSucks said of the album, "As the band devolves into synth drones and brown-note oblivion, they've simultaneously set listeners up to circle back and enjoy Pt. 1 all over again and ended their career on an impossibly high note. Where many of their contemporaries have either called it quits or begun to sputter, Project 86 has proven once and for all their legacy as one of the scene's most underrated artists. Fans will certainly get the brand finally they never knew they needed, and fans of smartly written metalcore will find plenty to chew on."

New Release Today did not post an official rating but praised the album nonetheless, stating that "Omni is a magnum opus of Project 86 and Andrew Schwab. It is a package for long-term fans and plenty for newer fans to love. With Parts 1 and 2, Omni will be a musical project that will echo in the minds of many fans for years to come, a showcase of musical expertise in balancing narrative, musical, and lyrical talent."

== Track listing ==
All lyrics are written by Andrew Schwab, Cory Brandan, Grayson Stewart and Philip Farris; all music is composed by Andrew Schwab, Matt Putman and Grayson Stewart.

Omni, Pt. 2 track listing
No.	Title	Length
1.	"Never Let a Crisis Go to Waste"	3:39
2.	"Ultraviolent"	3:49
3.	"Complete the Circle"	3:21
4.	"The Ex and the Why"	3:30
5.	"Taser5.0"	3:54
6.	"Trench Ejector"	4:00
7.	"Pariah"	4:54
8.	"Boiling the Ocean"	4:02
9.	"Shambolic"	4:15
10.	"Lonely Code"	4:17
11.	"Medusa" (featuring Johannes Persson of Cult of Luna)	5:28
Total length:		45:09

== Personnel ==
Project 86

- Andrew Schwab – vocals
- Matt Marquez – drums
- Darren King – rhythm guitar, production, engineering
- Michael Palmquist – lead guitar, production, engineering
- Grayson Stewart – bass

Additional personnel

- George Lever – mixing
- Matt Putman – production, engineering
- Don Phüry – album artwork, design
- Johannes Persson – guest vocals and guitar on track 11
