= Rest and Let Go =

Studio album by the Overseer
- Released: March 4, 2014
- Genre: Christian rock, experimental rock, screamo
- Length: 34:43
- Label: Solid State
- Producer: Matt McClellan

The Overseer chronology
We Search, We Dig (2012)	Rest and Let Go (2014)

Rest and Let Go is the second studio album for Christian metal band the Overseer, and was released on March 4, 2014 by Solid State Records. The album saw commercial success and received a positive critical reception.

== Critical reception ==
Professional ratings
Review scores
Source	Rating
About.com	3.5/5 stars
CCM Magazine	4/5 stars
ChristCore	4/5 stars
The Christian Music Review Blog	4/5 stars
Christian Music Zine	4/5 stars
HM Magazine	2.5/5 stars
Indie Vision Music	4/5 stars
Jesus Freak Hideout	4/5 stars
Outburn	8/10
Substream Magazine	4/5 stars

Rest and Let Go garnered generally positive reception from the ratings and reviews of music critics. Matt Conner of CCM Magazine rated it four stars, writing that the release is "a slightly decelerated set of songs from their debut that still makes a mark on the hard rock market", and he calls this a "Strong second effort." At Jesus Freak Hideout, Michael Weaver rated it four stars, stating that "While it's arguable that the highs of Rest & Let Go are higher than the highs of We Search, We Dig, it could also be said that the lows are a bit lower": however, "the musicality is top notch, the vocals are spot on, and the lyrics are taut." Tim Dodderidge of Substream Magazine rated it four stars, writing that "While the group’s first record was a solid first step, this new set of songs is carving a bright and auspicious path for the quartet." At Outburn, Nathaniel Lay rated the album an eight out of ten, stating "Rest and Let Go opens strong and ends strong, all without skipping a beat along the way." Chad Bowar of About.com rated the album three and a half stars, calling "The Overseer are more than a paint by numbers band."

At Indie Vision Music, Brody B rated the album four stars, saying the band were "able to refine the sound" from the first release on this one. Anthony Ibarra of ChristCore rated it four stars, stating that "This record is full of ambiance, power, and truth, which elevates this record to excellence" on which it "is sure to push the band skywards." At Christian Music Zine, Graeme Jones rated it four stars, writing that the band have "Room for improvement", yet they "hit a sweet spot that hardcore fans would not want to miss out on." The Christian Music Review Blog's Brad Johnson rated the album four stars, calling the songs "solid" because "each member has tweaked their style and leveled up their instrumental capabilities a touch, and it shows on this album." Collin Simula of HM Magazine rated it two-and-a-half stars, saying that "The Overseer have written a decent album that had the potential to be great, but was held back by being almost completely unoriginal."

== Commercial performance ==
For the Billboard charting week of March 22, 2014, Rest and Let Go was the No. 47 most sold album in the breaking and entry chart of the United States known as the Top Heatseekers, and it was the No. 44 Top Christian Album.

== Track listing ==
Tracklist
No.	Title	Length
1.	"Fragile Wings"	3:50
2.	"Paper Thin Houses"	3:43
3.	"The Structure/The Foundation"	4:07
4.	"Finer Friend"	3:32
5.	"Deluded"	2:06
6.	"Scarlet Wool"	3:35
7.	"Death March"	2:40
8.	"The Ferryman, Charon"	1:17
9.	"Uproot"	2:46
10.	"Give Light to My Eyes"	3:27
11.	"Depraved"	3:40
Total length:		34:43

== Credits ==
- Tony Rivera - vocals
- Darren King - guitar, backing vocals
- Bradley Riggs - bass
- Abishai Collinngsworth - drums

Production

- Matt McClellan - producer, mixing
- Jerrod Naff - engineering
- Troy Gelssner - mastering
- Brandon Ebel - executive producer
- Jordan Butcher - art direction, design

== Chart performance ==
Chart (2014)	Peak position
US Christian Albums (Billboard)	44
US Top Heatseekers Albums (Billboard)	47
