= Project 86 =

American rock band

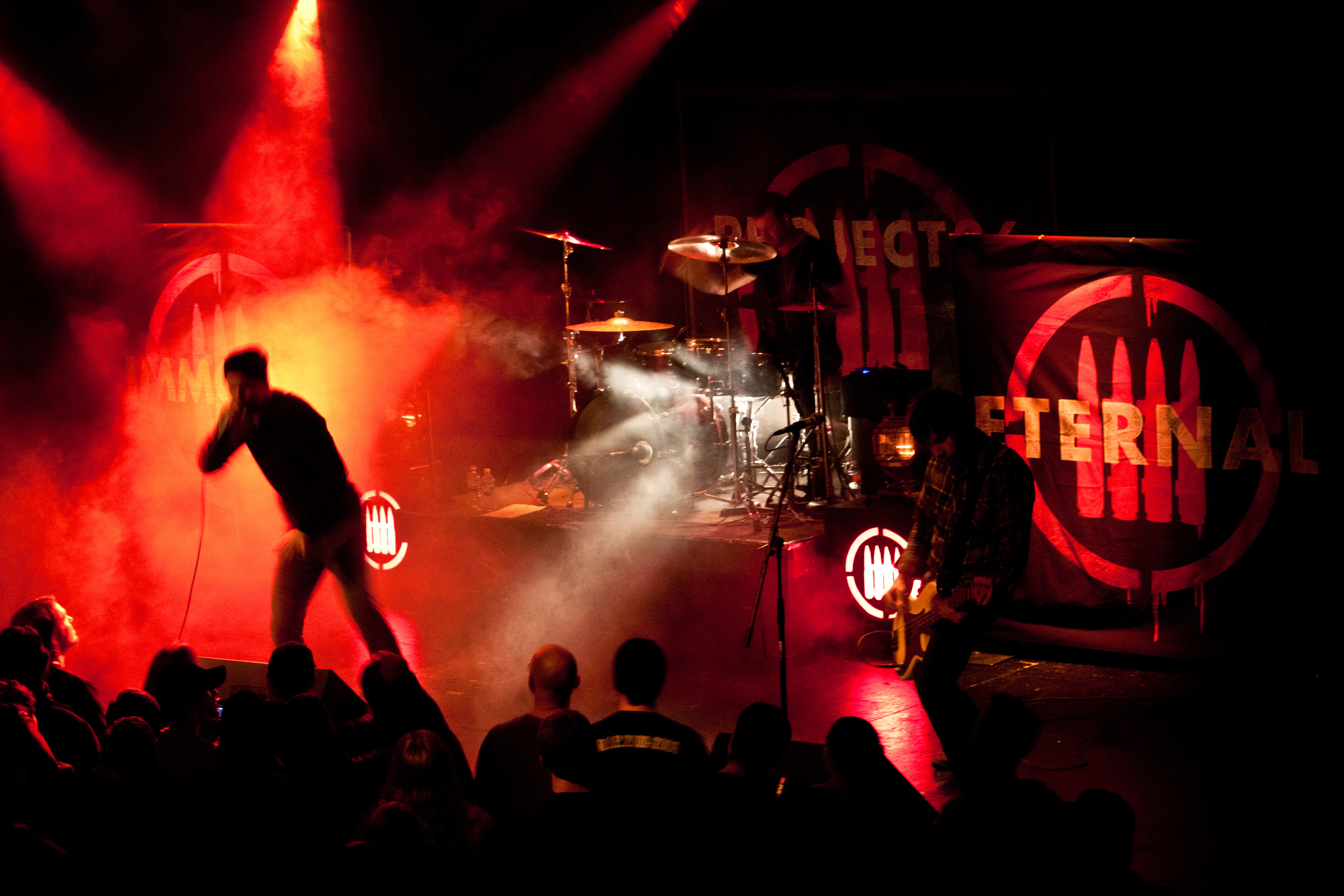
- Project 86 performing in 2012

Background information
- Origin: Orange County, California, U.S.
- Genres: Christian rock; Christian metal; alternative metal; nu metal; post-hardcore
- Years active: 1996–present
- Labels: Atlantic, BEC, Tooth & Nail
- Members: Andrew Schwab; Darren King; Abishai Collingsworth; Cody Driggers; Blake Martin
- Past members: Mike "Norman" Williams; Scott Davis; Alex Albert; Corey Edelmann; Steven Dail; Randy Torres; Ethan Luck; Matt Hernandez; Jason Gerken; Dustin Lowery; Ryan Wood; Matt Schilthuis
- Website: project86.com

Project 86 is an American rock band from Orange County, California, formed in 1996. The band has released twelve albums, which have collectively sold nearly 500,000 units worldwide, two EPs, two DVDs, and two live albums.

In 1998, BEC Recordings released a self-titled debut album that was well received by critics and consumers. Their second release, Drawing Black Lines, garnered attention from mainstream record labels; Atlantic licensed the album from Tooth & Nail Records, the parent company of BEC. The band's third release, Truthless Heroes, was released exclusively by Atlantic, after the band was bought-out of their original deal with Tooth & Nail. The band parted ways with Atlantic shortly after their third release, upon which they had a short stint as an independent. The band then negotiated a new contract with Tooth & Nail, and subsequently released three more albums, the last one being Picket Fence Cartel in summer 2009. After fulfilling their last agreement with T&N, in December 2011 the band announced a Kickstarter campaign via their official website and Facebook page, stating that "the fans are now our record label." Their eighth studio release, Wait for the Siren, was released in 2012. Their ninth album, Knives to the Future, was independently released by Team Black Recordings in 2014.

== History ==
=== 1996–1999: Formation and self-titled debut ===
According to the official Project 86 documentary "XV," Project 86 formed in mid 1996 by vocalist Andrew Schwab in Orange County, California. Guitarist Randy Torres, who was a sophomore in high school, was the first member recruited. The original lineup included Schwab, Torres, Ethan Luck (Demon Hunter, Relient K), and bassist Matt Hernandez (Unashamed, The Dingees). Drummer Alex Albert was added when Hernandez left the band after a few rehearsals, then Luck moved to bass from drums. Luck left the band to join The Dingees in Summer 1997, after which high school senior Steven Dail joined in late 1997.

Schwab comments in a 2004 interview regarding the number 86 in the band name: "The generation before us used that phrase to describe when they would reject or remove something...Project 86 is like the whole idea of being rejected, or separate, or not going along with the current." The group did not travel much initially; they decided to hone their sound and live performances before embarking on tours. In 1997, Project 86 was voted one of the top independent acts of the year by HM magazine readers. At Tomfest the same year, their performance was a big hit and Tooth & Nail Records, became interested and subsequently signed them.

Bryan Carlstrom produced their self-titled debut. He had engineered albums by multi-platinum outfits The Offspring and Alice in Chains as well as producing labelmates Stavesacre . Schwab drew upon personal struggles he was experiencing at the time to write meaningful lyrics. Sonny Sandoval, lead singer of nu metal group P.O.D., appeared as a guest performer. The album was released in June 1998 and was well received. It sold over 50,000 copies to date and gained mainstream exposure on MTV shows Road Rules and The Real World. Project 86 was observed by Allmusic to be the "most daring album at the time for its genre". The success of their debut made Project 86 a top seller for BEC/Tooth and Nail. The band embarked on a pioneering tour called "The Warriors Come Out and Play Tour" in May 1999 with friends P.O.D. and Blindside as the middle slot, which drew crowds of 600-1000 across the nation.

=== 2000–2003: Drawing Black Lines and Truthless Heroes ===
The group worked on their sophomore record with producer Garth "GGGarth" Richardson. in Vancouver, BC. Schwab wrote lyrics about a wider variety of issues, rather than just focusing on personal expression with their sophomore release: "The new album deals a lot less with me, and more with the world around us; Issues in people, society, culture". The sound was heavier and more progressive, with more hints of melody as well. As soon as the album was finished it garnered interest from several major labels, and Atlantic records licensed the album for co-release with Tooth and Nail/BEC in March 2000. Drawing Black Lines peaked at No. 37 on Heatseekers, and was well received by critics. By this time, listeners in the band had begun to amass a sizable fanbase. Despite heavy reliance on tour dates and word of mouth to inform people of its release, the album experienced some commercial success when it eventually sold nearly 120,000 copies. The band added Cory Edelmann, previously of No Innocent Victim, after the album was finished. Project 86 traveled nationwide with P.O.D., Hed PE, and Linkin Park on the "Kings of the Game" tour in October 2000. They also played a string of shows with Queensrÿche.

In 2002, Project 86 teamed with Slayer producer Matt Hyde to record their next album. The record was envisioned as a critique of post-9/11 America and the music industry. Formatted as a concept album, it told the story of a character attempting to find fulfillment in modern culture. "Songs were written and assembled with a certain ebb and flow in mind," said Schwab, "I approached the album like writing chapters in a book." The group spent over 14 months recording demos for Atlantic, which invested nearly $1,000,000 in the project when it was all said and done. Because of the pressure to produce radio singles, the sound of the album was quite different from its previous releases, as was Schwab's cryptic lyrics, which represented the frustrations of being stifled creatively and feeling powerless in the process.

"Little Green Men"
Some Christians were concerned with the lyrics in Truthless Heroes; in the first track, Little Green Men, Schwab yells "I don't need anybody, I don't need anyone, I don't need your guidance home!". On the other hand, Allmusic writer Bradley Torreano declared it "one of the most topical metal albums of the turn of the century."

Truthless Heroes was released in September 2002 and peaked at No. 146 on the Billboard 200. Their first and only single, "Hollow Again", peaked at No. 35 on Mainstream Rock Tracks. Atlantic refused to release the second single because they claimed the lyrics conflicted with the Iraq War effort. While lauded by critics for its pounding criticism of the media and entertainment industry, the album proved to be controversial, particularly the promotional website. The group performed with Taproot on their self-titled tour in fall 2002. In addition, they played shows with Thirty Seconds to Mars, Trapt, Blindside, Trust Company, Sevendust, and Finger Eleven.

=== 2003–2006: Songs to Burn Your Bridges By and ...And the Rest Will Follow ===
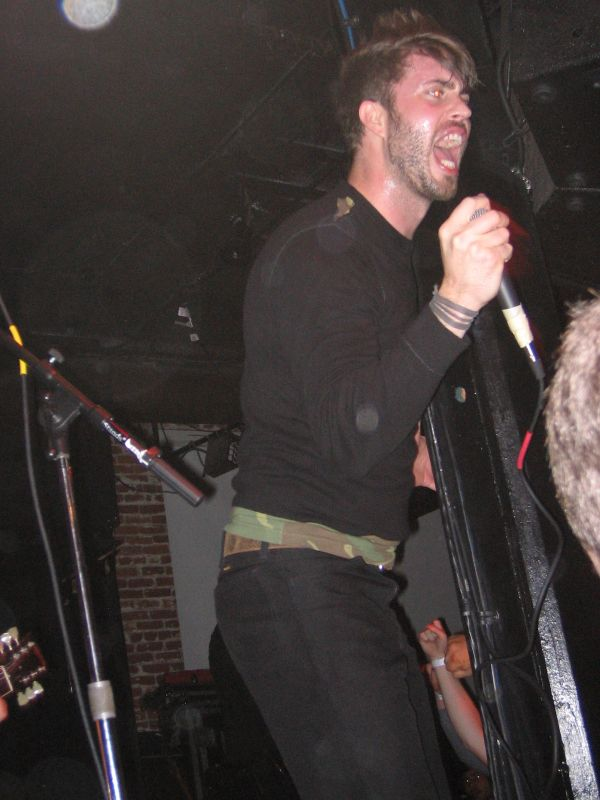
Andrew Schwab in 2006

In mid-2003 the band parted ways with Atlantic and their management team. The departure from Atlantic, in particular, was a big disappointment for the band. "All of the hype about our future successes turned out to be just that – hype, " said Schwab in an interview, "We did not go platinum [...] the record fell short of expectations and did not come close to the impact of our previous effort." Project 86 then started an independent label called "Team Black Recordings". Work began on a new album after Hyde was convinced to produce again. Their fourth album, Songs to Burn Your Bridges By, was made available exclusively on their website in Fall 2003.

The following year, Project 86 re-signed with their previous label, Tooth and Nail. Songs to Burn Your Bridges By was re-released in June 2004. The new version included 3 new tracks produced by Aaron Sprinkle and mixed by J.R. McNeely, several new mixes, and featured new artwork. The release peaked at No. 36 on Heatseekers, and was met with positive reviews by critics. According to Schwab, the album was a return to the bands heavier roots, and a means to express the frustrations the band went through during Truthless Heroes. The group performed at Purple Door, a Christian music festival, later that year. When Project 86 played their set, moshers threw mud everywhere and covered the stage and musical equipment. Thousands of dollars' worth of musical equipment was damaged.

In Spring 2005, Project 86 reunited with Drawing Black Lines producer Garth Richardson to record their fifth album, ...And the Rest Will Follow. After spending several days recording demos, the band flew to Vancouver, British Columbia, to record at The Farm Studios Compound. The band filmed the entire production and later released a DVD documentary entitled Subject to Change: The Making of ...And the Rest Will Follow. The album marked a spiritual change for the group who felt humbled by their past experiences. "The record is about growing up and becoming a man and taking responsibility for your past mistakes," said Schwab, "[We are] refocusing our goals back to what they were when we started, reaching kids and inspiring them to live lives with hope and purpose."

To promote the album, Project 86 released a new song on PureVolume every Monday until the release date. ...And the Rest Will Follow was released in September 2005 and debuted at No. 131 on the Billboard 200. Critics were positive about the release. The band began a fall release tour and traveled with Spoken, Number One Gun, The Fold, and Mourning September. In January 2006, a live performance of the single "My Will Be A Dead Man" was broadcast on Attack of the Show!.

=== 2007–2008: Rival Factions, The Kane Mutiny EP, and This Time of Year EP ===
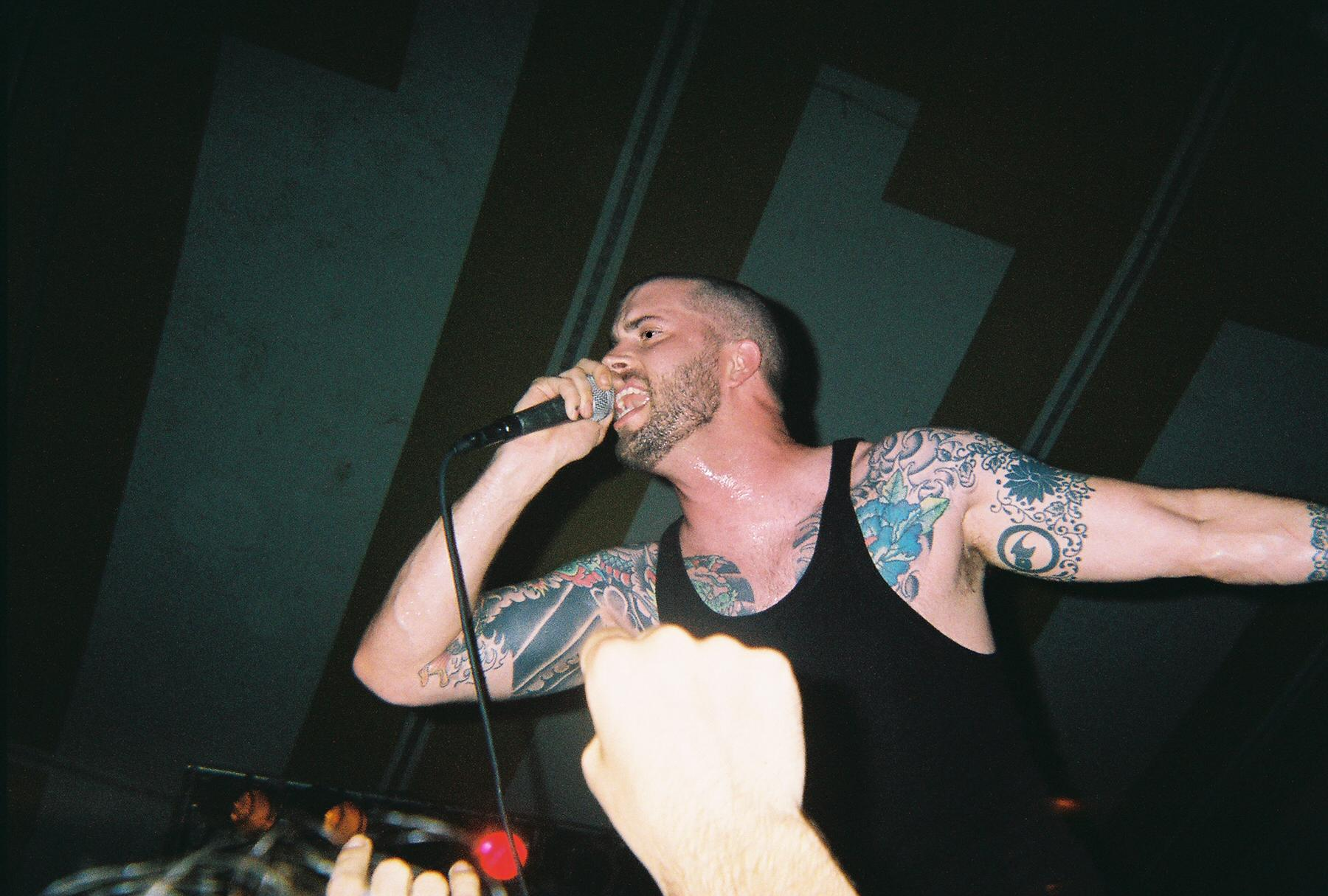
Vocalist Andrew Schwab performing at Cornerstone Festival 2007.

In March 2007, Project 86 announced that Alex Albert had parted with the band on friendly terms to pursue other interests. Instead of searching for a full-time replacement, the band recruited Jason Gerken, formerly of Shiner, to play drums on the record. Production of their sixth album, entitled Rival Factions, followed suit with Deftones engineer Ulrich Wild. The album proved to be a large departure from their edgier material by sporting a distinct 1980s sound influenced by goth rock.

In the end, 40 songs were amassed for the new record, but only ten were used. According to Schwab, the album's title was chosen to represent "the tension that exists in everybody [...] the flesh and the spirit." It was also representative of their new musical direction, an attempt to polarize themselves from other heavy rock acts. Similarly to their last record, a documentary was filmed that detailed the recording process, entitled I Want Something You Have: Rival Factions The DVD.

Rival Factions was released in June 2007 and peaked at No. 124 on the Billboard 200, the band's highest debut to date. The record sold 6,000 copies in the first week and was well received by critics, who made favorable comparisons to Duran Duran, Billy Idol, and the Killers. The band proceeded to tour with labelmates MXPX, Showbread, and Sullivan on the summer Tooth & Nail Tour. A performance also took place at the annual Christmas Rock Night event in Ennepetal, Germany, that December.

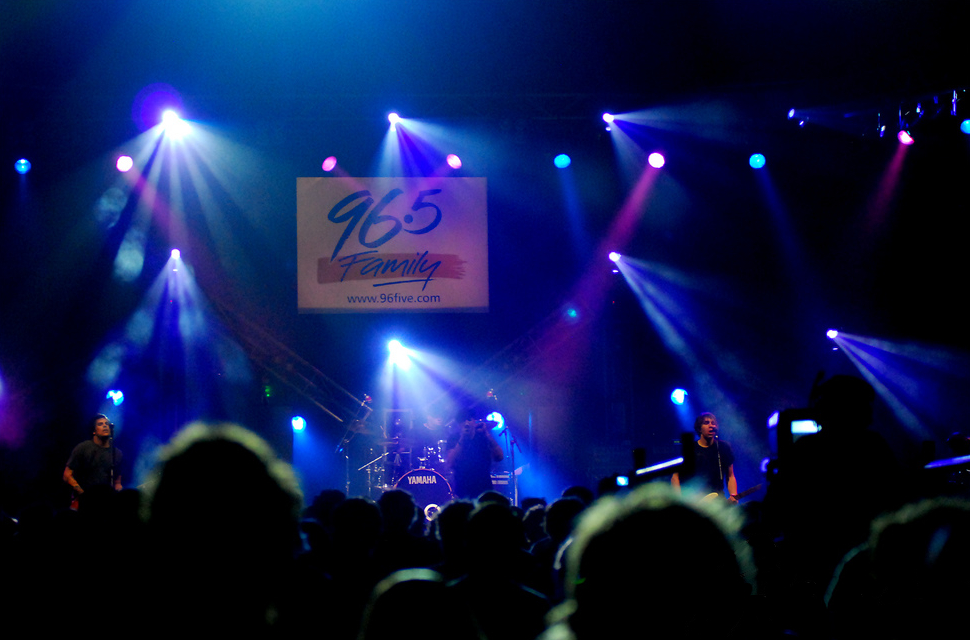
Project 86 performing at Easterfest 2008 in Australia.

Several tracks were recorded and mixed that were not included on Rival Factions. These songs were compiled with their previous remixes to form an EP. A cover of "Lucretia, My Reflection" by the Sisters of Mercy was also included. The Kane Mutiny EP was released exclusively on iTunes in November 2007. Shortly after its release, the band uploaded a cover of "This Time of the Year" by Brenda Lee on iTunes. "Our version was a little bit more like A Nightmare Before Christmas [sic]," declared Schwab. The single was well received and led Project 86 to build an entire EP around the Christmas concept. This Time of Year EP was released in November 2008. Unlike the previous EP, This Time of Year was made available in digital and physical formats. Jason Martin of indie rock outfit Starflyer 59 helped record both albums.

=== 2009–2012: Picket Fence Cartel and XV Live ===
In early 2009, the band returned to the studio with Martin and Ulrich Wild to record their seventh album, Picket Fence Cartel. Time was spent leisurely crafting the album; previous endeavors had been limited by deadlines. "This time around, we said, 'Look, let's not just put out another record,'" said Schwab, "'Let's make sure we get the record to a place that we're happy with it.'" The band focused on a heavy metal sound. However, they did not entirely jettison their 1980s influences as synthesizers percolated several songs. Schwab's lyrics focused on his belief that power and corruption often "run hand-in-hand when it comes to human souls." "The world is teaching us that fame is to be sought after; that recognition will equal success, fortune and, ultimately, peace," he said, "But the search for and attainment of fame and wealth usually destroy us in the end."

The record was released in July 2009 and peaked at No. 137 on the Billboard 200. Critics praised the title for its barrage of heavy rock and spiritually minded lyrics. Later that summer, Project 86 traveled nationwide on the Scream the Prayer Tour with metalcore outfits The Chariot, Haste the Day, and Gwen Stacy. Coming mid-October, Project 86 started the Picket Fence Cartel Tour with Children 18:3, Showbread, The Wedding, and Yearling, and added a second part in spring 2010 with Flatfoot 56 and Wavorly. The band released their first live album, entitled XV Live, in December 2010 to commemorate their 15th anniversary. The album's songs spanned every studio album with the exception of the first.

Randy Torres, who had been gradually becoming less involved in the band over the previous several albums, decided to leave the band in late 2008 to work for Tooth and Nail records, and later, Microsoft. Steven Dail followed suit approximately one year later, citing the need to stop touring and be home with his family.

=== 2012–2013: Wait for the Siren ===
In December 2011, Project 86 launched a Kickstarter campaign to help fund their next album, with plans to enter the studio the following month and to release the record independently.

The band's eighth studio album, Wait for the Siren, was recorded and released independently with that fan funding. In May 2012, the band named "Fall, Goliath, Fall" as the album's lead single, and the album was released on August 21, 2012.

=== 2014–2016: Knives to the Future ===
In February 2014, the band launched an Indiegogo campaign to independently fund their ninth studio album, an accompanying acoustic EP, and a solo release from Schwab. The campaign's US$50,000 goal was exceeded, raising nearly US$90,000.

Recording took place at Steelman Studios in Van Nuys, California, in June 2014, with the album produced by the band and Matt McClellan and mixed by Steve Evetts. The band spent the middle of the year in Los Angeles recording 18 new tracks including an acoustic EP. Joining Schwab in the studio is Darren King (The Overseer) on guitar, Cody Driggers (The Wedding) on bass, and Ryan Wood (7 Horns 7 Eyes) on drums.

In September 2014, the band announced the album's title as Knives to the Future and released its first song, "Spirit of Shiloh", for streaming. The album was released on November 11, 2014.

In 2016, the band started a celebration for their 20th anniversary. They announced that they would release a new record and when supporting their PledgeMusic campaign, they sent an EP to all pledgers, titled Influence EP, which consists of cover songs of bands that all influenced them. On September 13, 2016, the band announced their 20th anniversary tour with support from Death Therapy.

=== 2017–2024: Sheep Among Wolves and Omni ===
From October 2016 to October 2017, while the band was writing and recording new music, they released eight new songs total for pledgers who pre-ordered new album on PledgeMusic. On October 9, 2017, it was announced that a new album, Sheep Among Wolves, was to be officially released on December 5, 2017, in celebration of their 20th anniversary as a band. The album featured a three-piece lineup of Schwab, King, and Wolves at the Gate and The Overseer drummer Abishai Collingsworth.

In 2021, the band announced that their upcoming 11th studio album would be their last. On December 15, 2022, the first single for the album, "Metatropolis", was released, along with the album's name, Omni, as well as the announcement that it would be a double album, with Pt. 1 a full length and Pt. 2 two EPs. On January 20, 2023, the band released a second single for the album, "0 > 1". After a third single, "Virtual Signal", was released, Project 86 released Omni, Pt. 1 on March 24, 2023. Pt. 2 was slated for release on March 1, 2024, with the first single, "Ultraviolent", dropping on December 1, 2023. However, the album's release was moved early to January 12, 2024.

Despite the promotion of Omni as the band's last, in an interview with Heaven's Metal magazine, Andrew Schwab divulged that Project 86 would be rebranded P86:Omni with the new shift in genre, ending the former incarnation of the band and beginning the new one.

== Musical style ==
For most of their career, Project 86's music was characterized by heavy rock and Schwab's "loud, eerie, and atmospheric" vocal style. Their sound has been likened to rock groups Helmet, Rage Against the Machine, and Tool. The adjective "intense" has frequently been used as a description. Rick Anderson of Allmusic called the music "dense and crunchy", while Albuquerque Journal writer Ron Gonzales declared it a "blisteringly heavy sound." Commenting on their musical style, Schwab said, "Our goal as a band has been to never make the same record twice. The only rule is that there are no rules. If there is a rule, it's that we try not to over-think things, that the music that comes out is honest and real, spontaneous and from our heart."

When Project 86 released their self-titled record, they were generally acknowledged to be a rapcore band. Schwab has maintained it was never intentional, "I think we got lumped in with that music because we [had] toured with P.O.D. and Linkin Park." According to writer Mark Allan Powell, the music featured "cryptic, down-tuned guitars" and "half-spoken, half-rapped" vocals. Drawing Black Lines saw their style adopt elements of traditional metal, groove metal, and hard rock. The band used their song "Pipedream" as a blueprint to build the album: "We knew that was one of the brightest spots on the album," said Schwab, "I just wanted to take what we did in 'Pipedream' and go further with it". Experimentation with noise occurred in track "Twenty-Three", and would be revisited on their fourth album with "Circuitry".

Truthless Heroes and Songs To Burn Your Bridges By generally focused on a "dark, rock musical direction". The group strayed from the style for their fifth album ...And The Rest Will Follow, opting to flirt with melodies and harmonies. Rival Factions marked a great departure when they embraced 1980s music and utilized keyboards. Their signature hardcore sound was reinstated for Picket Fence Cartel. "We have had a great time adding more melody along the way," insisted Schwab, "but in our hearts, we still really enjoy playing aggressive songs". Even so, some songs retained synthesizers while others boasted folk influences.

"Illuminate"
"Illuminate" is the seventh track on Rival Factions. Allmusic writer Jo-Anne Greene called it "a hook-riven, keyboard driven number that sounds to be ripped right out of [a] Duran Duran songbook..."

"To Sand We Return"
The last track on Picket Fence Cartel, "To Sand We Return", contains a folk interlude that Schwab compared to "Stairway to Heaven" by Led Zeppelin. The lyrics speak about "unapologetically" surrendering to God.

The band's 2023 album Omni, Pt. 1 saw the band transition from their alternative hard rock to metalcore with heavy industrial and djent elements; Schwab's vocal style for this genre change transformed from expressive yelling into a vicious gritty roar. Talking about the dramatic shift in genre with Sound In the Signals, Schwab said, "To be honest, I had a hankering to take the sound of the band in a heavier direction for a very long time, really, since Drawing Black Lines was released—we knew that people who were familiar with the band would be excited, and I personally couldn’t wait to see the reactions. The most common comment [I get] is, 'Who is the guest vocalist?' Many people said this because I took a heavier approach with the vocals this time around; instead of my typical shout, I went more death metal. Many were surprised by this, but I actually have sung this way live for about a decade." Another reason for Schwab shifting the band's genre was professional throat care he underwent during the COVID-19 pandemic, to get rid of a nodule he had developed as far back as Truthless Heroes. This allowed him to experiment with vocal styles, which led to the genre shift.

=== Influences ===
Rock bands have largely influenced the band like the Deftones, Sepultura, Sick of It All, and Snapcase. At an early age, Schwab listened to Slayer, S.O.D., and Metallica. He later discovered East Coast hip hop. During the recording of Rival Factions, the band took heavy influence from post-punk groups like Depeche Mode, Joy Division, Psychedelic Furs, and The Sisters of Mercy. Some of their favorite bands are The Cure, Portishead, Quicksand, Shiner, and Sunny Day Real Estate.

=== Lyrics ===
Vocalist Andrew Schwab is the band's lead lyricist. Schwab has said most lyrics are based on his emotions. He also tries to incorporate social commentary from literature. Prominent influences include comic book artist Chris Ware and writers Chris Bachelder, Don DeLillo, Aldous Huxley, George Orwell, and T. S. Eliot. He has written lyrics on a variety of topics, including alcohol abuse ("One-Armed Man"), conformity ("S.M.C."), emptiness ("Evil (A Chorus of Resistance)"), greed ("Cold and Calculated"), nightlife ("Molotov"), spirituality ("Chapter 2"), pornography ("P.S."), and child molestation ("Sioux Lane Spirits"). He delved into conceptual writing for 2023 and 2024's Omni, detailing a story of an oppressive dystopian society led by a corporation that seeks to merge man with AI technology in order to eradicate God.

== Members ==
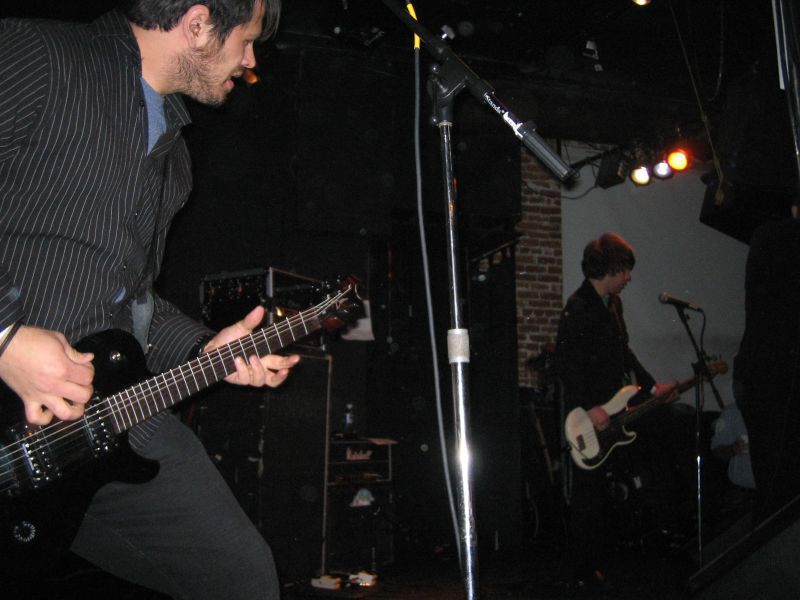
Guitarist Randy Torres and Bassist Steven Dail

Current lineup
Name	Instrument	Years	Other groups
Andrew Schwab	lead vocals	1996–present	London SiX Echo
Darren King	guitars, keyboards, backing vocals	2014–present	The Overseer
Cody Driggers	bass, backing vocals	2013–present	The Wedding
Blake Martin	guitars	2012 (Session), 2020–present	A Plea for Purging, Haste the Day
Abishai Collingsworth	drums	2016–present	The Overseer, Wolves at the Gate, TRAMPS

Former members
Name	Instrument	Years	Other projects
Ryan Wood	drums	2013–2016	7 Horns 7 Eyes
Dustinn Lowry	guitars, backing vocals	2012–2014	The Becoming
Mike "Norman" Williams	bass	2012–2013	The Agony Scene
Scott Davis	drums	2012–2013	The Myriad
Alex Albert	drums	1996–2007	Crash Rickshaw, Focused
Corey Edelmann	guitars, backing vocals	2000-2002	No Innocent Victim
Matt "Bean" Hernandez	bass	1996	Unashamed, The Dingees
Steven Dail	bass, guitars, backing vocals	1997–2010	Crash Rickshaw, Neon Horse, White Lighter, Bloodshed, Starflyer 59
Randy Torres	guitars, Keyboards, backing vocals	1996–2009	Crash Rickshaw, NYVES
Ethan Luck	drums, bass	1996–1997	The O.C. Supertones, Demon Hunter, Relient K, Kings of Leon
Jason Gerken	drums	2007–2012	Open Hand, Shiner, Hum

Studio and session musicians
Name	Instrument	Years	Other projects
Andrew Welch	guitar	2012	Disciple, TFK
Rocky Gray	drums	2012	Living Sacrifice, Soul Embraced, Evanescence, Solus Deus, Machina, Shredded Corpse
Grayson Stewart	bass	2023–2024	Great American Ghost, Norma Jean
Matt Marquez	drums	2023–2024	Haste The Day, Heartist, Nevea Tears, Norma Jean
Michael Palmquist	guitar	2023–2024	Norma Jean

Touring musicians
Name	Instrument	Years	Other projects
Alex	bass	2009	
Jack Huston	bass		Maranatha, White Wolves
Jason Wisdom	bass	2018	Becoming the Archetype, Solamors, Death Therapy
Josh Hagquist	guitar, backing vocals	2011, 2017–2019	The Beautiful Mistake, Stranger Kings
Jon Berndtson	bass, backing vocals	2019	The Beautiful Mistake, Years Spent, Get Young, Cue the Doves
Rein Blomquist	bass	2018	Kitfai
Arne Steinar Myrvang	drums	2018	Kitfai
Joey West	drums	2019	Disciple

== Discography ==
=== Studio albums ===
Title	Album details	Peak chart positions					
Title	Album details	US	US Christ.	US Rock	US Hard Rock	US Indie	US Heat.
Project 86	Released: June 16, 1998; Label: BEC; Formats: CD, cassette	—	—	—	—	—	—
Drawing Black Lines	Released: March 21, 2000; Label: BEC, Atlantic; Formats: CD, cassette	—	14	—	—	—	—
Truthless Heroes	Released: September 24, 2002; Label: Atlantic; Formats: CD, cassette	146	9	—	—	—	4
Songs to Burn Your Bridges By	Released: November 14, 2003; Label: Team Black Recordings; Formats: CD	—	14	—	—	—	36
...And the Rest Will Follow	Released: September 27, 2005; Label: Tooth & Nail; Formats: CD	131	7	—	—	—	3
Rival Factions	Released: June 19, 2007; Label: Tooth & Nail; Formats: CD	124	5	—	—	—	—
Picket Fence Cartel	Released: July 14, 2009; Label: Tooth & Nail; Formats: CD, LP	137	7	—	—	—	—
Wait for the Siren	Released: August 21, 2012; Label: Team Black Recordings; Formats: CD, LP, digital download	127	4	38	7	18	—
Knives to the Future	Released: November 11, 2014; Label: Team Black Recordings; Formats: CD, LP, digital download	—	38	—	—	—	—
Sheep Among Wolves	Released: December 5, 2017; Label: Team Black Recordings; Formats: CD, LP, digital download	— (Note: Sheep Among Wolves did not enter the Billboard 200, but peaked at No. 90 on the Top Current Albums chart.)	19	—	—	15	—
Omni, Pt. 1	Released: March 24, 2023; Label: Spaceuntravel; Formats: CD, LP, digital download	—	—	—	—	—	—
Omni, Pt. 2	Released: January 12, 2024; Label: Spaceuntravel; Formats: CD, LP, digital download	—	—	—	—	—	—

=== Live albums ===
- 2010: 15. Live.

=== EPs ===
- 2007: The Kane Mutiny EP (digital only)
- 2008: This Time of Year EP (Christmas)
- 2012: The Midnight Clear Single (Christmas)
- 2016: Influence EP (Cover EP)

=== Singles ===
Title	Year	Peak chart positions	Album
Title	Year	US Main.	Album
"Pipe Dream"	1998	—	Project 86
"One-Armed Man (Play On)"	2000	—	Drawing Black Lines
"Hollow Again"	2003	35	Truthless Heroes
"The Spy Hunter"	2003	—	Songs to Burn Your Bridges By
"My Will Be a Dead Man"	2005	—	...And the Rest Will Follow
"All of Me"	2005	—	...And the Rest Will Follow
"Evil (A Chorus of Resistance)"	2007	—	Rival Factions
"This Time of Year"	2008	—	This Time of Year EP
"Dark Angel Dragnet"	2009	—	Picket Fence Cartel
"The Butcher"	2010	—	Picket Fence Cartel
"Destroyer"	2010	—	Picket Fence Cartel
"The Spy Hunter (Live)"	2011	—	15. Live.
"Fall, Goliath, Fall"	2012	—	Wait for the Siren
"Omerta's Sons"	2013	—	Wait for the Siren
"Off The Grid"	2013	—	Wait for the Siren
"New Transmission"	2013	—	Wait for the Siren
"Pale Rider"	2014	—	Knives to the Future
"Ambigram"	2015	—	Knives to the Future
"By Constantine"	2016	—	Sheep Among Wolves
"MHS"	2017	—	Sheep Among Wolves
"Metatropolis"	2022	—	Omni, Pt. 1
"0 > 1"	2023	—	Omni, Pt. 1
"Virtual Signal"	2023	—	Omni, Pt. 1
"Ultraviolent"	2023	—	Omni, Pt. 2
"Pariah"	2024	—	Omni, Pt. 2

== Filmography ==
Documentaries

- 2004: Subject to Change: The Making of ...And the Rest Will Follow
- 2007: I Want Something You Have: Rival Factions the DVD
- 2012: XV the DVD

Music videos

- "Pipe Dream"
- "One-Armed Man (Play On)"
- "Spy Hunter"
- "My Will Be a Dead Man"
- "Evil (A Chorus of Resistance)"
- "Destroyer"
- "Fall, Goliath, Fall"
- "Knives to the Future"
- "Metatropolis"
- "0 > 1"
- "Virtual Signal"
- "When the Belfry Speaks"
- "Ultraviolent"
- "Pariah"
- "Complete the Circle"
