= Songs to Burn Your Bridges By =

Studio album by Project 86
- Released: November 14, 2003
- Studio: The Square (Orange County, California); Studio B (West Hollywood, California)
- Length: 40:09
- Label: Team Black, Tooth & Nail
- Producer: Aaron Sprinkle, Matt Hyde

Project 86 chronology
Truthless Heroes (2002)	Songs to Burn Your Bridges By (2003)	...And the Rest Will Follow (2005)

Professional ratings
Review scores
Source	Rating
AllMusic	3/5 stars
CCM Magazine	Positive
Christianity Today	3.5/5 stars
Cross Rhythms	8/10 stars
HM	Positive
Jesus Freak Hideout	4/5 stars

Songs to Burn Your Bridges By is the fourth album by the American Christian rock band Project 86. Originally released independently in November 14, 2003, on the band's own label Team Black, the album was re-released on Tooth & Nail Records on June 1, 2004. In addition to a slightly re-ordered track listing, the re-release featured new artwork, three previously unreleased songs, and higher production quality.

Only 5,000 copies of the Team Black edition were pressed.

== Track listing ==
2003 Team Black release

No.	Title	Length
1.	"The Spy Hunter"	3:37
2.	"Oblivion"	4:05
3.	"Safe Haven"	3:29
4.	"Circuitry"	4:02
5.	"The Great Golden Gate Disaster"	3:42
6.	"Say Goodnight to the Bad Guy"	3:54
7.	"Breakneck Speed"	3:42
8.	"Sioux Lane Spirits"	4:43
9.	"A Fruitless End Ever"	2:58
10.	"A Text-Message to the So-Called Emperor"	1:02
11.	"Solace"	5:02

2004 Tooth & Nail release

No.	Title	Length
1.	"The Spy Hunter"	3:37
2.	"Oblivion"	4:05
3.	"A Shadow on Me"	3:30
4.	"Safe Haven"	3:29
5.	"Say Goodnight to the Bad Guy..."	3:54
6.	"Breakdown in 3/4"	4:58
7.	"The Great Golden Gate Disaster"	3:42
8.	"Breakneck Speed"	3:42
9.	"Sioux Lane Spirits"	4:43
10.	"Circuitry"	4:02
11.	"3 Card"	2:18
12.	"A Fruitless End Ever"	2:58
13.	"A Text-Message to the So-Called Emperor"	1:02
14.	"Solace"	5:02

== Personnel ==
Project 86

- Andrew Schwab – vocals
- Steven Dail – bass
- Randy Torres – guitar, keyboards, vocals
- Alex Albert – drums

Production

- Aaron Sprinkle – producer
- Matt Hyde – producer
