= The Wedding (The Wedding album) =

Studio album by The Wedding
- Released: February 15, 2005
- Recorded: 2004/2005
- Genre: Alternative rock, pop punk, emo
- Label: Rambler, Brave New World
- Producer: Mark Lee Townsend

The Wedding chronology
The Wedding (2005)	Rumble in the South EP (2005)

Professional ratings
Review scores
Source	Rating
AllMusic	3/5 stars
Christian Music Today	4/5 stars
Cross Rhythms	6/10 stars
Jesus Freak Hideout	3.5/5 stars

The Wedding is the first self-titled release from the American punk rock band, The Wedding. It was released February 15, 2005 on Rambler Records, and is the only album put out by the band to have four members. Two singles have been released from this album, "Move this City" and "Song for the Broken". No music videos have been released for this cd, single or otherwise. The album received mostly positive reviews and the band soon released a follow-up EP, Rumble in the South, with bonus songs and later a second album, Polarity. This album includes guest vocals from Matt Thiessen of Relient K in the song "But A Breath".

== Sound ==
The Wedding's debut release is lighter than other albums; this is because of the band only having four members at the time of this release. The music relies on Kevin Kiehn's high vocals and piano and pushes the bass into the background. The band's then current drummer, Clint Robinson, plays lightly with more simple beats rather than "Polarity" which features fast drumming.

== Track listing ==
1. "Morning Air"
2. "Move This City"
3. "This Time I'm Leaving"
4. "Wake the Regiment"
5. "One Eye Open"
6. "Price for Love"
7. "Death by Xanga"
8. "479HxC (Through the Night)"
9. "Joyride"
10. "But a Breath"
11. "Water Under the Bridge"
12. "Song for the Broken"

== Credits ==
- Kevin Keihn — lead vocals, piano, synthesizer
- Trevor Sarver — guitars
- Cody Driggers — bass, backing vocals
- Clint Robinson — drums, piano
- Mark Townsend — producer, engineer
