= Crash Rickshaw =

American musical project

- Origin: Orange County, California, United States
- Genres: Rock, alternative rock, indie
- Years active: 2001–present
- Label: Tooth & Nail
- Spinoff of: Project 86
- Members: Joby Harris; Randy Torres; Steven Dail; Alex Albert

Crash Rickshaw is a post-hardcore band from Southern, California. It was founded as a side project by Alex Albert, Steven Dail and Randy Torres of the band Project 86 along with punk vocalist Joby Harris. Crash Rickshaw released their first self-titled album on September 11, 2001, on Tooth & Nail Records. Their second EP album, Big Sir, was released August 1st, 2025 on Velvet Blue Music.

== Members ==
- Joby Harris - vocals, guitar
- Randy Torres - guitar, background vocals
- Steven Dail - bass, background vocals
- Alex Albert - drums

== Discography ==
- Crash Rickshaw (2001, Tooth & Nail Records)
- The Unknown Clarity (2008, independent release)
- Big Sir (2025, Velvet Blue Music)
