= Take Me as I Am (FM Static song) =

"Take Me As I Am"

Single by FM Static

from the album Dear Diary
- Released: 2009
- Genre: Christian rock
- Length: 3:33
- Label: Tooth & Nail
- Songwriters: Trevor McNevan, Steve Augustine

FM Static singles chronology
"The Unavoidable Battle of Feeling on the Outside" (2009)	"Take Me As I Am" (2009)	"Her Father's Song" (2009)

"Take Me As I Am" is the third single released by Canadian band FM Static, from their third album, Dear Diary. It is the first song to chart for the band. The song was originally released for listening before the release of the album, along with "Boy Moves to a New Town With Optimistic Outlook" and "The Unavoidable Battle of Feeling on the Outside".

== Charts ==
Chart (2009)	Peak position
U.S. Christian Songs	28
