= FM Static =

Canadian Christian rock band

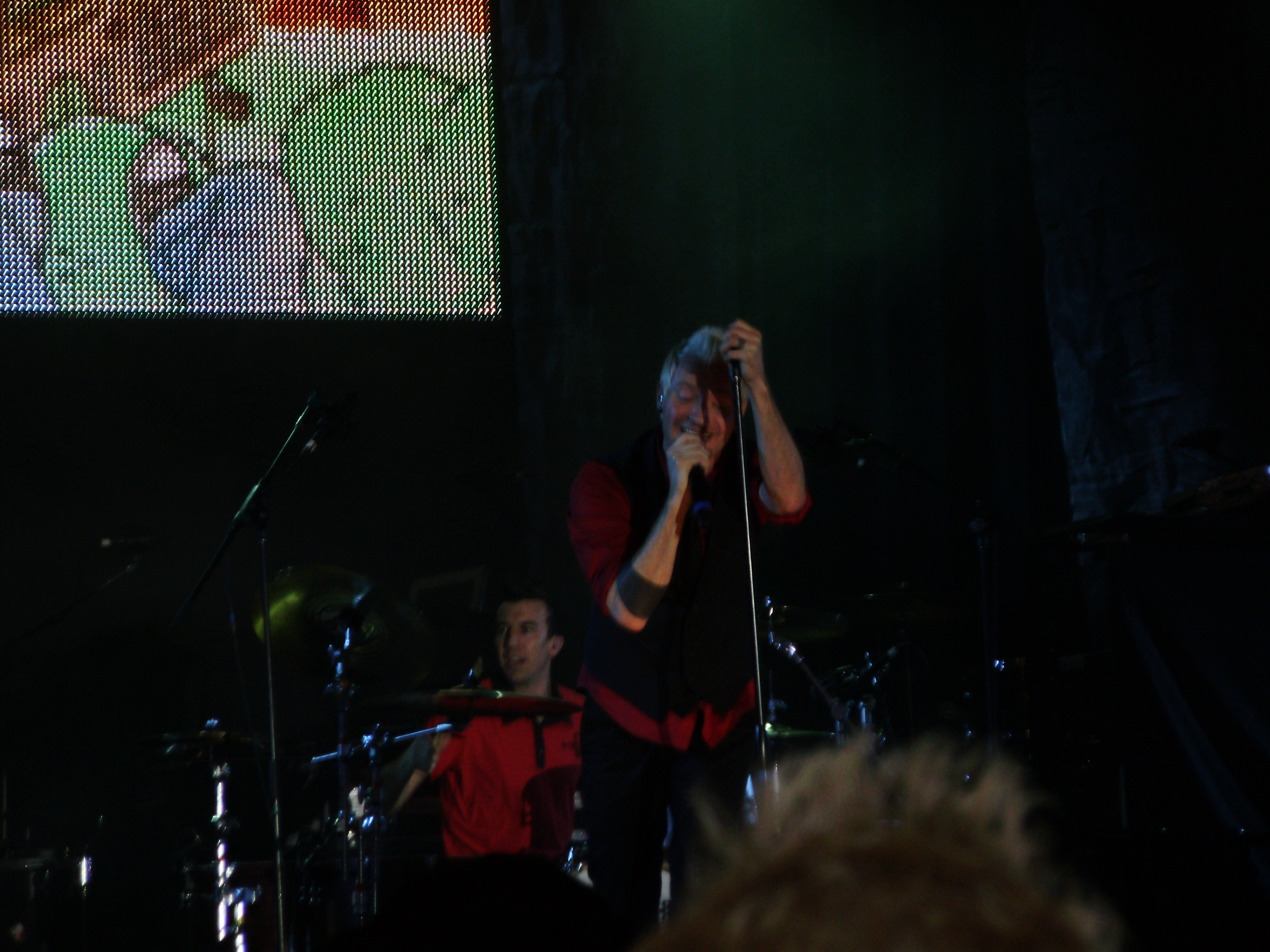
- FM Static performing in Rochester NY in 2009

Background information
- Origin: Toronto, Ontario, Canada
- Genres: Christian rock; pop-punk; emo
- Years active: 2003–2011
- Label: Tooth & Nail
- Spinoff of: Thousand Foot Krutch
- Past members: Trevor McNevan; Justin Smith; Jeremy Smith; John Bunner; Steve Augustine

FM Static was a Canadian Christian rock/pop-punk band based in Toronto, Ontario. The band was formed in 2003 as a side project for Thousand Foot Krutch, and consisted of Trevor McNevan and Steve Augustine. The original lineup also included John Bunner on guitar and Justin Smith on bass. The band released four studio albums, most recently My Brain Says Stop, But My Heart Says Go! (2011).

== Career ==
Their first album What Are You Waiting For? was produced by Aaron Sprinkle, who also produced Thousand Foot Krutch's album Phenomenon. The album featured the hit singles "Definitely Maybe", "Something to Believe In", and "Crazy Mary". FM Static toured through 2003 to 2005; John Bunner quickly retired after playing a few shows and so Justin asked his brother Jeremy to fill in for them.

On August 1, 2006, FM Static released their second album titled Critically Ashamed, which featured the single "Waste of Time". Originally, a cover of Vanilla Ice's "Ice Ice Baby" was to be included on this album, but it was removed later in the production process. The band did not tour in support of their second album because the Smith brothers had stopped playing for them. So FM Static became a two-piece band with studio musicians filling in for the other parts. While their second album featured only the single "Waste of Time", the songs "Tonight" and "Moment of Truth" went on to become huge unadvertised Internet hits, as well as hits on some radio stations. The song "Tonight" had accumulated over seventy million hits on YouTube as of November 2011, while "Moment of Truth" had more than fifty million.

On April 7, 2009, FM Static released their third studio album Dear Diary. Written as a concept album, it details the fictional story of a boy facing the difficulties of life, love and faith, as told through his diary entries. The entries themselves were released in a blog prior to the album's release, and are included in the CD booklet, accompanied by illustrations drawn by Worth Dying For guitarist Nathan Parrish. This album featured the singles "Boy Moves to a New Town With An Optimistic Outlook", "The Unavoidable Battle of Feeling On the Outside", and "Take Me As I Am". Trevor announced in a TFK broadcast that FM Static planned to tour again in 2009 to promote the album. This was confirmed when FM Static was added to setlist of the Creation Festival tour alongside TFK as well as Jars of Clay, AA Talks, B.Reith and This Beautiful Republic. Due to the fact the Trevor and Steve could not play all instrumentals, Nick Baumhardt from TFK filled in on the tour, as well as Tom Beaupre on bass and keyboards.

McNevan also posted on his Twitter account on February 5, 2010, that he is in the process of finishing new songs for FM Static, which will appear on a new record. He stated originally that the album's title would be 4, but he later mentioned on his personal Facebook page that the title had been changed to My Brain Says Stop, But My Heart Says Go. At Lifest 2010, FM Static debuted a song from this album called "Cinnamon & Lipstick". On November 23, FM Static released a triple pack, 3 Out of 4 Ain't Bad.

On April 5, 2011, FM Static released their fourth studio album My Brain Says Stop, But My Heart Says Go!. Two singles from the album have been released; "My Brain Says Stop, but My Heart Says Go!" and "Last Train Home". Another single from this album, "F.M.S.T.A.T.I.C.", can be heard in episode 12 of the CW show Hellcats.

== Members ==
=== Final lineup ===
- Trevor McNevan – vocals, guitars (2003–2011)
- Steve Augustine - drums (2003–2011)

=== Former members ===
- John Bunner – guitar (2003)
- Justin Smith – bass (2003–2005)
- Jeremy Smith – guitar (2004–2005)

=== Touring musicians ===
- Tom Beaupre – bass, keyboards, backing vocals (2009–2011)
- Nick Baumhardt – guitar (2006–2009)

== Discography ==
=== Studio albums ===
Year	Title	Label	Chart peaks		
Year	Title	Label	US	US Heat	US Christ
2003	What Are You Waiting For?	Tooth & Nail Records	—	—	—
2006	Critically Ashamed	Tooth & Nail Records	—	16	38
2009	Dear Diary	Tooth & Nail Records	199	6	16
2011	My Brain Says Stop, But My Heart Says Go!	Tooth & Nail Records	—	5	13

=== Singles ===
Year	Title	Peak		Album
Year	Title	United States Christian songs	Air 1	Album
2003	"Definitely Maybe"	–	–	What Are You Waiting For?
2004	"Crazy Mary"	–	–	What Are You Waiting For?
2005	"Something to Believe In"	–	–	What Are You Waiting For?
2006	"Waste of Time"	–	–	Critically Ashamed
2006	"Tonight"	–	–	Critically Ashamed
2006	"Moment of Truth"	–	–	Critically Ashamed
	"Nice Piece of Art"			
2009	"Boy Moves to a New Town with Optimistic Outlook"	–	–	Dear Diary
2009	"The Unavoidable Battle of Feeling on the Outside"	–	–	Dear Diary
2009	"Take Me as I Am"	28	1	Dear Diary
2010	"Her Father's Song"	–	–	Dear Diary
2011	"My Brain Says Stop, But My Heart Says Go!"	–	–	My Brain Says Stop, But My Heart Says Go!
2011	"Last Train Home"	–	–	My Brain Says Stop, But My Heart Says Go!
*Note: All chart positions above "Waste of Time" in the Canadian Hot 100 section are from the Canadian Singles Chart.

=== Compilation appearances ===
- Canada Rocks - "Moment of Truth" (CMC, 2008)
- GMA Canada presents 30th Anniversary Collection - "Crazy Mary" (CMC, 2008)
- X Christmas - "Christmas Shoes" (BEC, 2008)
- Songs from the Penalty Box, Vol. 6 - "Boy Moves to a New Town with Optimistic Outlook" (Tooth & Nail Records, 2009)
- Boomin' - "Tonight" (Starsong/EMD, 2010)
- Rock What You Got - "Definitely Maybe" (Starsong/EMD, 2010)
- Happy Christmas Vol. 5 - "Snow Miser" (Tooth & Nail Records, 2010)

=== Videos ===
- "Definitely Maybe
- "Boy Moves to a New Town with Optimistic Outlook"
- "Take Me as I Am"
- "Her Father's Song"

== Awards and recognition ==
GMA Canada Covenant Awards

- 2009 nominee, Modern Rock/Alternative Album of the Year: Dear Diary
- 2009 nominee, Pop/Contemporary Song of the Year: "Take Me as I Am"

Juno Awards

- 2010 nominee, Best Contemporary Christian/Gospel Album: Dear Diary
