= Knives to the Future =

Studio album by Project 86
- Released: November 11, 2014
- Genre: Alternative rock, Christian rock, post-hardcore
- Length: 40:47
- Label: Team Black
- Producer: Matt McClellan, Andrew Schwab

Project 86 chronology
Wait for the Siren (2012)	Knives to the Future (2014)	Sheep Among Wolves (2017)

Knives to the Future marks the ninth album from Project 86. Team Black Recordings released the project on November 11, 2014. Project 86 worked with Matt McClellan and Andrew Schwab on the production of this album.

== Reception ==
Professional ratings
Review scores
Source	Rating
Christ Core	8.5/10
CM Addict	4/5 stars
HM Magazine	4.5/5 stars
Indie Vision Music	5/5 stars
Jesus Freak Hideout	4.5/5 stars 3.5/5 stars 4/5 stars
Jesus Wired	8/10 stars
New Release Tuesday	4/5 stars

Signaling in a four and a half star review by HM Magazine, Sean Huncherick replies, "Knives to the Future not only carries the hype, but vaults it over." Michael Weaver, indicating in a four and a half star review from Jesus Freak Hideout, recognizes, "Project's latest is musically hard-hitting and lyrically challenging and on point." Shaving a half star off her review is New Release Tuesday's Mary Nikkel, responding, "This is a project likely to further solidify the loyalty of their dedicated following." Specifying in a five star review by Indie Vision Music, Lee Brown reports, "Knives to the Future is poetry that is formatted for the pleasure of your auditory canals." Andrew Funderburk, awarding the album four stars at Christian Music Review, writes, "Although Knives to the Future is lyrically sound and has stand-out tracks, like any album should, the overall general feel does lack somewhat in the energy that rock usually gives." Rating the album an eight star release for Jesus Wired, Topher P. says, "Although there are, like practically any other release, a few low points on the record, that tally stays at only a few." Jacob Neff, awarding the album an eight and a half out of ten at Christ Core, writes, "Project 86 has created a beautiful, powerful, and complex album that has further stretched the band’s creative muscles."

== Track listing ==
No.	Title	Length
1.	"Intro"	1:10
2.	"Spirit of Shiloh"	3:47
3.	"Acolyte March"	3:12
4.	"Knives to the Future"	3:17
5.	"Son of Flame"	3:38
6.	"Captive Bolt Pistol"	2:32
7.	"Ambigram"	2:36
8.	"Genosha"	3:38
9.	"Pale Rider"	3:47
10.	"Valley of Cannons"	2:55
11.	"White Capstone"	3:40
12.	"Oculus"	6:43
Total length:		40:47

Special Edition Bonus Digital Acoustic EP
No.	Title	Length
13.	"Nocturnal Gaze"	3:05
14.	"Firefly Without a Night"	3:16
15.	"Transposeur"	3:05
16.	"In Trenches"	3:03
Total length:		53:12

== Personnel ==
Adapted from AllMusic.

Project 86

- Andrew Schwab – vocals
- Darren King – guitar, keyboards
- Cody Driggers – bass, backing vocals
- Ryan Wood – drums

Addition musicians

- Joshua Clifton (Ravenhill) – gang vocals
- Jeff Gingrich – cello, violin
- Allison Schwab – piano

Production

- Alan Douches – mastering
- Steve Evetts – mixing
- Matt McClellan – engineer, keyboards, producer
- Dan Mumford – packaging

== Charts ==
Chart (2014)	Peak position
US Top Christian Albums (Billboard)	38
