= The Wedding (band) =

American alternative rock band

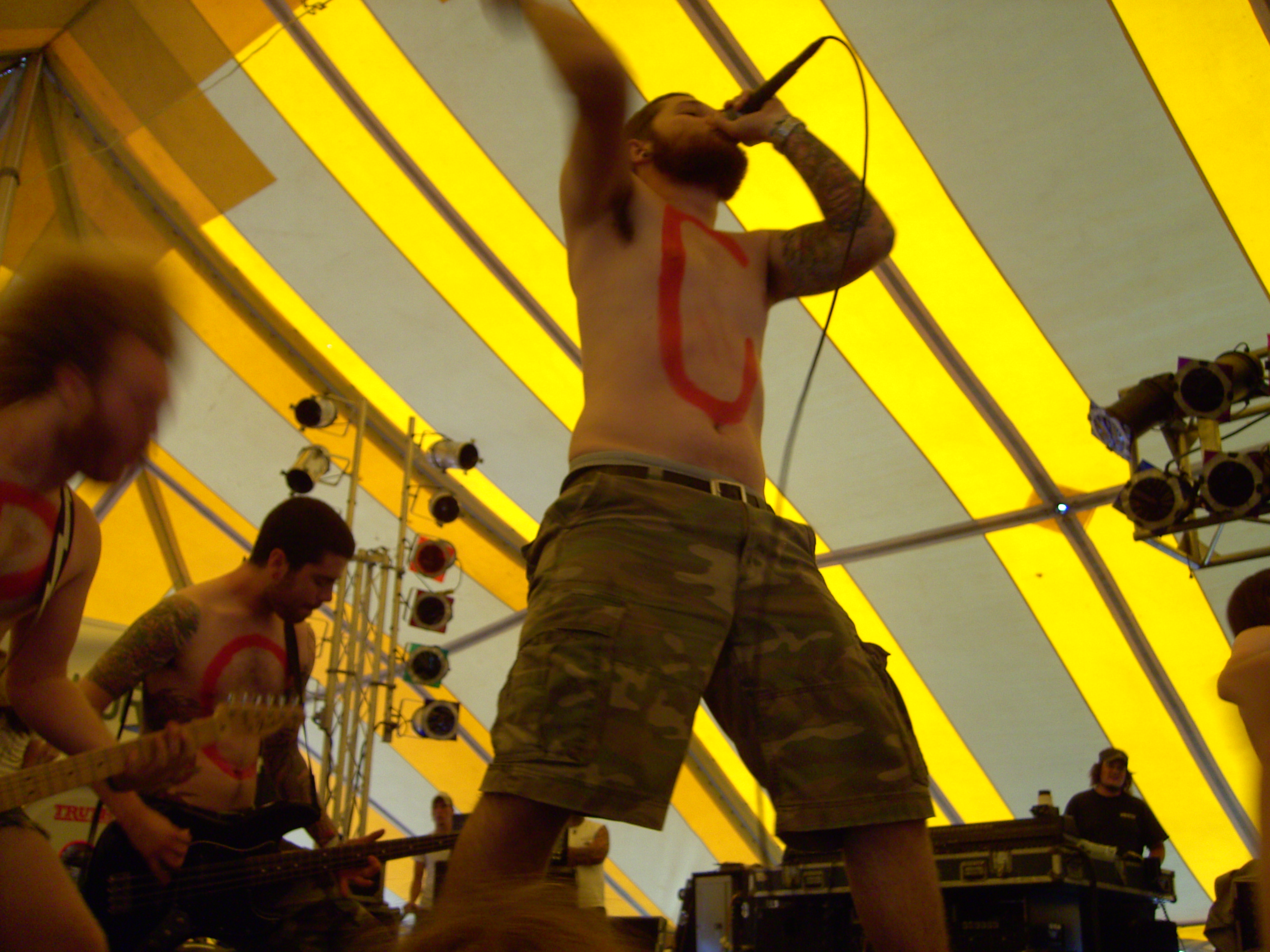
- The Wedding plays at Cornerstone Festival 2007.

Background information
- Origin: Fayetteville, Arkansas, United States
- Genres: Alternative rock, post-hardcore, punk rock
- Years active: 2003–2015
- Labels: Brave New World/originally Rambler Records (2004-2009); Independent (2009-2012); Tooth & Nail Records (2012–2015)
- Past members: Matt Shelton; Trevor Sarver; Adam Thron; Matt Jameson; Cody Driggers; Andy Heck; Clint Robinson; Joe Rickard; Kevin Kiehn; Jeremy Ervin

The Wedding (formerly known as Easier Said) were an American alternative rock band from Fayetteville, Arkansas, United States. Musically, The Wedding fuses elements of Alternative rock, pop punk, ska, piano rock, and post-hardcore with their pop rock base. The band was signed to independent Brave New World Records, but the label was closed in 2009; leaving the band with no label.

The band has toured with the likes of Thousand Foot Krutch, Love and Death, Bachman–Turner Overdrive, Bleach, John Reuben, The Goodnight Fight, Last Tuesday, Number One Gun, Anberlin, Spoken, Disciple, The O.C. Supertones, Superchic[k], The Fold, House of Heroes and Falling Up. Their debut album, The Wedding was produced by Mark Lee Townsend and featured several of their songs which became Christian radio hits, including "Move This City" and "Song for the Broken". Their second release, Polarity, peaked at No. 41 on the Billboard Christian Albums chart and No. 26 on the Heatseekers chart.

After former singer Kevin Kiehn got married, he departed the band. Landon Ginnings filled in for him on vocals until their current singer, Matt Shelton, formerly of Letter Kills, joined.

== Hiatus ==
On August 27, 2015, The Wedding posted on their official Facebook page that they are confirming a hiatus the following message was posted:

"Hey y'all. Been a minute! It's time to reconnect and break the silence. It's no secret that we fell off the map without a trace a couple years ago. We've gotten a lot of questions about the status of the band, what happened, and what's next. The truth is, we haven't made a statement thus far because there hasn't been anything to state. We never intended for the last tour we did to have been our last tour. We wrapped it up, headed on home as usual, and settled in until the next one. But between then and now I guess "life" just happened. Members got married, members had babies, members got cool job opportunities and started businesses, members began the adoption process, members filled in for other bands, members moved to new cities; and before we knew it two years had gone by and we still hadn't booked that next tour. That brings us to today.

No, we didn't break up. We just went on an unplanned indefinite hiatus (to put it in "band" terms). For those that followed the band since the beginning you know we were road dogs. 200+ shows a year for nearly a decade. We were almost never home. And we liked it that way. We've all learned to love being home, too. It's been more of a struggle to adjust for some than others but all in all this is a good season. Will we play shows again? Maybe. Will we make another record? Maybe. What are the chances? To be honest, I don't think any of us have any idea. Touring and records cost a lot of money, more than we have. But I do know this: we talk about it often. Yes, talk is cheap, but talk keeps it in the realm of possibility. I tell you this not to give you false hope if you are into our band, but to let you know that if you are reading this then we care about you and we care that you care if we make music again. Whether it happens or not, please know that while we were a full-time band, you guys handed us the time of our lives on a silver platter. Yeah, we roughed it hard in a van driving through the night and playing smokey bars and sleeping on floors for a decade yada yada yada, but we really had the time of our lives. And the ONLY reason we could stay on the road is because you cared about our music and spent your hard earned money on show tickets and merchandise and records. That will never be unappreciated. More importantly, you showed up and connected with us, and gave us the opportunity to have a real connection with you, as we all connected with the bigger picture. We were definitely a live band. If you never got to see it, I don't know whether you are lucky or I should feel sorry for you because it was always messy. A loud messy chaotic rock n roll hurricane, every night, whether for 100 people that were into it or 1,000 people that hated it, we went hard and loved every minute. We are all still close, even in different states, as this is much more than a band to us. This is a brotherhood. And brotherhoods don't just fade out. So to answer your question, once and for all, no matter what: The Wedding will never die. Rock n Roll Forever.

— Cody, Matt, Adam, Trevor, Matt. Collectively: The Wedding"

They have since gotten back together for a final reunion show.

== Members ==
- Kevin Kiehn - lead vocals, piano, synthesizer (2003–2007)
- Trevor Sarver - guitars, backing vocals (2003–2015)
- Cody Driggers - bass, backing vocals (2003–2006, 2007–2015); guitars, backing vocals (2006–2007) (Currently playing with Project 86)
- Clint Robinson - drums, piano (2003–2006) (now with Adoleo)
- Jeremy Ervin - bass (2006–2007)
- Joe Rickard - drums (2006–2007) (also played with In Flames)
- Adam Thron - guitars, backing vocals (2007–2015) (formerly of The Gentleman Homicide)
- Matt Jameson - drums, backing vocals (2007–2015) (formerly of The Gentleman Homicide & Upperroom)
- Matt Shelton - lead vocals, guitars (2008–2015) (formerly of Letter Kills)
- Andy Heck - drums (2012-2013)

== Discography ==
=== Studio albums ===
Released	Title	Label(s)
February 15, 2005	The Wedding	Rambler Records
April 17, 2007	Polarity	Brave New World Records
October 9, 2012	No Direction	Tooth & Nail Records

=== Studio EPs ===
Released	Title	Label(s)
2006	Rumble in the South EP	Rambler Records
June 17, 2008	The Sound, The Steel EP	Brave New World Records
November 16, 2010	Distance EP	(independent)
