= Drawing Black Lines =

2000 studio album by Project 86

Studio album by Project 86
- Released: March 21, 2000
- Recorded: 2000
- Studio: The Factory Studios (Vancouver, Canada)
- Genre: Nu metal, alternative metal
- Length: 56:40
- Label: BEC, Atlantic
- Producer: Garth Richardson

Project 86 chronology
Project 86 (1998)	Drawing Black Lines (2000)	Truthless Heroes (2002)

Alternative Cover
- Artwork for Atlantic Records re-issue

Drawing Black Lines is the second studio album by the American band Project 86. The success of their debut, especially the song "Pipe Dream", attracted the attention of several major record labels. Originally released on BEC Recordings on March 21, 2000, the album was reissued with Atlantic Records branding after the major label signed the band.

== Reception ==
Professional ratings
Review scores
Source	Rating
AllMusic	4/5 stars
College Music Journal	(Positive)
Cross Rhythms	9/10 stars
Jesus Freak Hideout	5/5 stars

AllMusic has described the album as "a testimony to Christendom while musically driving a fist through traditional Christian thinking." Lyrically, the album takes a different thread from its predecessor, turning the mirror of introspection into a window viewing society at large. The music also shows significant gains in maturity as well, advancing from a rapcore sound to one classified as metalcore or alternative metal.

One reviewer comments that "Moral lines are drawn beginning to end on this disc." Lyricist Andrew Schwab states that "Drawing Black Lines is not just a catch phrase or an album title... When I am faced with challenges, my true character is revealed. And only by drawing a definite line, which separates me from every wrong choice, will I be able to be all I am meant to be."

The BEC and Atlantic pressings are virtually the same. The original BEC version has a full-color booklet with a fold out on both ends of band photos. The Atlantic version is condensed into regular pages and for some reason is only in black and white. There are also minor alterations in the album artwork, as well as the CD itself.

== Track list ==
All lyrics are written by Andrew Schwab; all music is composed by Project 86

No.	Title	Length
1.	"Stein's Theme"	3:55
2.	"One-Armed Man (Play On)"	3:44
3.	"Me Against Me"	3:38
4.	"PS"	5:54
5.	"Set Me Up"	3:07
6.	"Chimes"	4:58
7.	"A Toast to My Former Self"	3:23
8.	"Sad Machines"	4:16
9.	"Star (*)"	4:53
10.	"Chapter 2"	3:16
11.	"Open Hand"	2:39
12.	"Twenty-Three"	12:57
Total length:		56:40

== Personnel ==
- Andrew Schwab – vocals
- Randy Torres – guitar, vocals, piano
- Steven Dail – bass, guitar
- Alex Albert – drums
- GGGarth – producer, additional engineer
- Brandon Ebel – executive producer
- Andre Wahl – engineer, mixing
- Chris Vaughn Jones – additional engineer
- Scott Ternan – recording assistant
- Roger Swan – mixing assistant
- Sleepy J – digital editing
- Alex (the Amazing Condor) Aligizakis – assisted with digital editing
- FU – programmer
- Richard Leighton – guitar technician
- Chris Crippin – drum technician
- Brian "Big Bass" Gardener – mastering
- Shuji – band photography
- Happenstance – sleeve design
