= Unashamed (band) =

American Christian hardcore punk band

- Origin: California, U.S.
- Genres: Hardcore punk; Christian punk; Christian metal; metalcore; Christian hardcore
- Years active: 1993–1998, 2009–2011, 2023–present
- Label: Tooth & Nail
- Past members: Jeff Jacquay; Bobby Canaday; Dom Macaluso; Matt Mentley; Randy Baranosky; Dave Bhanson; Dave Lauridsen; Dan McManigal; Christopher Bertoni; Shane Sowers; Jason Carson; Matt Hernandez
- Website: Unashamed on Facebook

Unashamed is a Christian hardcore punk band that became one of the founding bands in the Spirit-Filled HardCore movement. Their bold faith-based lyrics center around ideas directly lifted from the Bible and conservative morality. They released two albums on Tooth & Nail Records. After signing with Tooth & Nail, the band toured until their "final" show at Cornerstone Festival in 1998. In 2009, the band announced that they were reforming with many of their original line-up, and would begin touring hard into 2010.

== Members ==
Last known lineup

- Jeff Jacquay – vocals (1993–1996, 2009–2011)
- Bobby Canaday – guitar (1993–1998, 2009–2011)
- Dom Macaluso – bass guitar (2009–2011)
- Matt Mentley – guitar (2009–2011)
- Randy Baranosky – drums (2009–2011)

Former members

- Dave Bhanson – vocals (1993)
- Dave Lauridsen – vocals (1993)
- Dan "Danno" McManigal – guitar (1993–1998)
- Chris Bertoni – drums (1993–1995)
- Shane Sowers – bass guitar (1993–1995)
- Jason Carson – drums (1995–1998)
- Matt Hernandez – bass guitar (1995–1998)

Timeline

== Discography ==
'Studio albums

- Silence (1994)
- Reflection (1996)

Compilation appearances

- Helpless Amongst Friends Vol. 1 (1995)
