= Déjame Dormir =

Studio album by Starflyer 59
- Released: January 2, 2025
- Genres: Lullaby; indie rock
- Length: 33:16
- Label: Velvet Blue Music
- Producer: Frank Lenz

Starflyer 59 chronology
Lust for Gold (2024)	Déjame Dormir (2025)	Disappointed (2026)

Déjame Dormir is the first re-recording album by American alternative rock band Starflyer 59. It was released on January 2, 2025 by independent label Velvet Blue Music. The album features lullaby versions of past Starflyer 59 songs.

== Track listing ==
All songs written by Jason Martin.

Déjame Dormir track listing
No.	Title	Original album	Length
1.	"Major Awards" (Dormir Version)	Old	3:06
2.	"I Was 17" (Dormir Version)	Easy Come, Easy Go	3:17
3.	"New Guitar" (Dormir Version)	Vanity	2:13
4.	"All My Friends Who Play Guitar" (Dormir Version)	Leave Here a Stranger	5:18
5.	"When I Learn To Sing" (Dormir Version)	Leave Here a Stranger	3:27
6.	"This Recliner" (Dormir Version)	Miami	3:53
7.	"YZ80" (Dormir Version)	Lust for Gold	4:37
8.	"One Shot Juanita" (Dormir Version)	Starflyer 59 (Gold)	4:26
9.	"Hazelwould" (Dormir Version)	Starflyer 59 (Silver)	2:59
Total length:			33:16

== Personnel ==
Credits are adapted from the album's cover notes.

Production

- Frank Lenz – production

Artwork

- Jason71 (Jason Pickersgill) – design

Management

- Jeff Cloud – executive producer
