= The Brothers Martin (album) =

Studio album by The Brothers Martin
- Released: January 23, 2007
- Genres: Indie rock; synth-pop; new wave
- Length: 34:54
- Label: Tooth & Nail
- Producer: The Brothers Martin

The Brothers Martin chronology
Jesus (Note: Released as Dance House Children.) (1992)	The Brothers Martin (2007)

The Brothers Martin is the debut and sole album by indie rock band The Brothers Martin. It was released on January 23, 2007, by Tooth & Nail Records. Consisting of Joy Electric frontman Ronnie Martin and Starflyer 59 frontman Jason Martin, The Brothers Martin is a spiritual successor to the work of their early 1990s music group Dance House Children. The album explores themes such as time and regret.

Ronnie and Jason Martin are joined by Project 86 members Alex Albert and Steven Dail on studio drums and audio editing respectively. The sound of the album has been said to resemble that of Morrissey and The Cure.

== Background and recording ==
In the CD liner notes for the Starflyer 59 Easy Come, Easy Go compilation album released in 2000, band biographer J. Edward Keyes records that fledgling Christian musicians Ronnie and Jason Martin formed Dance House Children in 1991 as a Californian synth-pop music group. The Martins had signed to Blonde Vinyl, a new record label started by Lifesavers Underground frontman Michael Knott. Around the time of the collapse of Blonde Vinyl in late 1992, Jason Martin had been seeking to make heavier, guitar-oriented music, working on demos at home. With Jason intending to release his own music on Knott's follow-up label, the Martins ended up meeting Tooth & Nail Records founder Brandon Ebel at a local music festival. After impressing Ebel with a copy of Jason's demos, Ebel signed Jason's Starflyer 59 to Tooth & Nail as his third band. Starflyer 59 released Silver as its first studio album, featuring a heavy alternative rock sound strongly influenced by British shoegaze bands of the early 1990s. In the late 1990s, Jason began to veer toward indie rock, starting with The Fashion Focus in 1998. Ronnie Martin would continue to release synth-pop music under the name Joy Electric, where he also signed with Tooth & Nail (and later its BEC Recordings imprint).

Some time after splitting into their own music endeavors, the idea of a new collaborative album had been considered casually for years. During a discussion in 2005, Ronnie Martin and Brandon Ebel resurfaced the idea:

I was talking to Brandon [in 2005] and we were talking about something else and the idea of [The Brothers Martin] just kind of popped out there. Instead of sloughing it off like I've done, I said, "Let me talk to Jason and let's get the ball rolling and see if we can finally do this and quit leaving it as something that's sort of dangling in the background." So I talked to [Jason] and we worked out a deal with Brandon to release it.

Due to the growing album libraries of Joy Electric and Starflyer 59, Ronnie states that he "didn't want [the collaborative album] to be a B-sides thing." To avoid this, The Brothers Martin was developed as "a collection of brand new songs composed by Ronnie or Jason and then each providing their idiosyncratic take on the songs." With regard to composing songs, Jason explains, "I think me and my brother were used to just doing our own thing. But [on this record] when he was putting his keyboards on my songs, I was just letting him doing his thing. And the other way around, it was pretty much him letting me do my thing, coming up with parts that we both liked." Ronnie expands on this in stating, "We've never really written with anybody [else] before in our lives. I didn't think it was something where we'd be able to get together and sort of democratically push everything out."

Considering the unique nature of the album, Ronnie states, "If we're going to do it, let's [make it] good. Everybody is going to have their own opinions anyway, there's nothing you can do about that. For the most part it had to be, Hey, we know how to write these catchy jingles, let's make sure the jingles are as catchy as our other jingles." Jason adds to this by stating, "I like the idea just hearing what somebody else has to offer because I think it's a way of turning your same old tricks into some new tricks."

== Release ==
The Brothers Martin was released on January 23, 2007, by Tooth & Nail Records. On May 1, 2007, Clerestory AV, in collaboration with Tooth & Nail, released a 180-gram LP vinyl edition of The Brothers Martin, limited to 500 copies.

=== Artwork ===
Designed by Ryan Clark (Invisible Creature, Seattle, WA), the cover art features a stylized schematic of the Earth's magnetic properties. Drawn with white on a dark slate background, Earth is represented by a centered circle, bisected by a horizontal equatorial line and accompanied by a long, dashed vertical axis. Tracing magnetic field lines, a long diagonal line intersects the equatorial line, where two curved lines radiate along the diagonal. Beginning at the center of the diagonal line are two circular arcs on opposite sides, each overlapped by a larger arc. Two small arrows next to the left radiating curve and right larger arc indicate the direction of the magnetic field along the illustrated lines.

The CD liner notes contain two additional sets of illustrations. The first depicts magnetic fields around a magnet, and the second depicts magnetic fields generated by the current of charged particles.

== Critical reception ==
Professional ratings
Review scores
Source	Rating
HM Magazine	3/5
Jesusfreakhideout.com	4/5 stars
Cross Rhythms	6/10 squares
Indie Vision Music	8/10
The Phantom Tollbooth	4/5 stars

The Brothers Martin received generally positive reviews from critics upon its release. Writing for Indie Vision Music, Josh Murphy states, "Many people assumed this would simply be a 'B-sides' type of release and not really a cohesive effort. However, upon listening you should put that thought to rest. ... the whole album has a nice flow throughout and is a perfect mix of the brothers' respective styles." Writing for Jesusfreakhideout.com, Josh Taylor states, "The resulting ten tracks on their self-titled debut, not very surprisingly, sound a whole lot like what would happen if you joined Joy Electric and Starflyer 59 together. It's got the catchy synth and keyboards of Joy Electric, but runs it behind some indie sensibility on drums and guitar." Taylor also states that his "only complaint ... would be the somewhat irritating chorus repetitions on songs like 'Deaf Will Hear.' Thankfully, those moments are few and far between, and are outweighed by the good found on this record." Writing for Cross Rhythms, John Hebden felt that "Ronnie's keyboards are fighting for supremacy over Jason's guitars. ... both Ronnie and Jason write strong, quirky hook lines, which lift the songs out of some of the lyrical darkness. However, both rely a lot on repetition to fill out the total of just 35 minutes for the whole album."

== In popular culture ==
The song "The Plot That Weaves" was featured in "The Rusty Nail," the third episode of the first season of the ABC Family television series Greek. The episode was broadcast on July 23, 2007. In addition, the song "The Missionary" was featured in "Chuck Versus the Intersect," the pilot episode of the NBC television series Chuck. The episode was broadcast on September 24, 2007.

== Track listing ==
Album release
No.	Title	Writer(s)	Length
1.	"Communication"	The Brothers Martin	2:29
2.	"The Harsh Effects of Time"	Ronnie Martin	3:55
3.	"The Missionary"	Jason Martin	2:03
4.	"The Deaf, They Will Hear"	Ronnie Martin	3:21
5.	"The Plot That Weaves"	Jason Martin	3:32
6.	"Fears to Remember"	Ronnie Martin	3:54
7.	"Opportunities"	Jason Martin	4:09
8.	"The Behaviour Explains"	Ronnie Martin	3:49
9.	"Get the Money"	Jason Martin	3:45
10.	"Life on Strings"	Ronnie Martin	3:57
Total length:			34:54

== Personnel ==
Credits are adapted from the album's liner notes.

The Brothers Martin

- Jason Martin – vocals, guitar, bass guitar
- Ronnie Martin – vocals, synthesizer, drum machine and bass programming

Additional musicians

- Alex Albert – drums

Production

- The Brothers Martin – production, recording, mixing
- Steven Dail – editing
- Troy Glessner (Spectre Studios, Renton, WA) – mastering

Artwork

- Invisible Creature (Seattle, WA) – art direction
- Ryan Clark (Invisible Creature) – design and illistration

Management

- Brandon Ebel – executive producer
- Jeff Carver – A&R
