= Never Play Covers =

Live album by Starflyer 59
- Released: June 2005
- Recorded: February 2004 (Atlanta, GA)
- Genre: Alternative rock; indie rock
- Length: 36:26
- Label: Badout

Starflyer 59 chronology
| Talking Voice vs. Singing Voice (2005) | Never Play Covers (2005) | My Island (2006) |

Never Play Covers is the third live album by American alternative rock band Starflyer 59. It was released by the independent label Badout in June 2005.

== Track listing ==
All songs written by Jason Martin.

| No. | Title | Original album | Length |
|---|---|---|---|
| 1. | "Wake Up Early" | I Am the Portuguese Blues | 2:56 |
| 2. | "New Wife, New Life" | Old | 3:40 |
| 3. | "Unlucky" | I Am the Portuguese Blues | 3:18 |
| 4. | "The Big Idea" | I Am the Portuguese Blues | 3:55 |
| 5. | "Not Funny" | I Am the Portuguese Blues | 3:47 |
| 6. | "Unbelievers" | Old | 5:27 |
| 7. | "Birthrite (Note: The title of this track differs from the studio version by omitting the initial article "The.")" | The Fashion Focus | 3:23 |
| 8. | "Teens in Love" | I Am the Portuguese Blues | 2:55 |
| 9. | "Worth of Labor" | I Am the Portuguese Blues | 2:54 |
| 10. | "Play the C Chord" | Everybody Makes Mistakes | 4:11 |
| Total length: | | | 36:26 |

== Personnel ==
Credits are adapted from the album's cover notes.

Starflyer 59

- Jason Martin – guitar, vocals
- Frank Lenz – drums

Additional musicians

- Dean Lorenz – guitar
- Eric Collins – bass guitar

Artwork

- Hifashn – photography and design
