= I Am the Portuguese Blues =

Studio album by Starflyer 59
- Released: February 24, 2004
- Studio: The Black Hand
- Genre: Alternative rock; indie rock; shoegaze
- Length: 27:25
- Label: Tooth & Nail
- Producer: Starflyer 59

Starflyer 59 chronology
Old (2003)	I Am the Portuguese Blues (2004)	Talking Voice vs. Singing Voice (2005)

Starflyer 59 studio albums chronology
Old (2003)	I Am the Portuguese Blues (2004)	Talking Voice vs. Singing Voice (2005)

Professional ratings
Review scores
Source	Rating
AllMusic	2.5/5 stars
Christianity Today	4.5/5 stars
Cross Rhythms	8/10 squares
Jesusfreakhideout.com	4/5 stars
Punknews.org	0.5/5 stars

I Am the Portuguese Blues is the eighth studio album by alternative rock band Starflyer 59. It was released on February 24, 2004 by Tooth & Nail Records.

With this album, the band returned to its past in multiple ways. The band's earlier albums had been characterized by loud guitars, but later albums saw the band progress to a softer sound, incorporating keyboards. I Am the Portuguese Blues saw the return of the sound from earlier albums, as the band was stripped just to Jeff Cloud on bass, Frank Lenz on drums, and Jason Martin, the only person to perform on all of Starflyer 59's albums, handling guitar and vocal duties. In addition, the album has a monochromatic cover, similar to those of Starflyer 59's first three albums (Silver, Gold, and Americana).

All songs except "Wake Up Early" and "Worth of Labor" were originally developed as demos intended for a follow-up to Americana. The post-Americana demos were eventually shelved, as the band decided to take a different musical direction for The Fashion Focus. The demos were refined and combined with the two new songs for I Am the Portuguese Blues. With regard to the album title, band frontman Jason Martin mentioned,

I thought the title was odd. There are a couple of proper blues riffs‚ on there, but mainly it is just a rock and roll album – no tricks no gimmicks.... And, oh yeah, I'm Portuguese.

== Track listing ==
All songs written by Jason Martin.

I Am the Portuguese Blues track listing
No.	Title	Length
1.	"Wake Up Early"	2:53
2.	"Unlucky"	2:11
3.	"Teens in Love"	2:53
4.	"The Big Idea"	2:53
5.	"Worth of Labor"	2:48
6.	"Not Funny"	2:34
7.	"Sound on Sound"	2:34
8.	"Destiny"	2:24
9.	"No Revolution"	3:33
10.	"I Need Some Help"	2:42
Total length:		27:25

== Personnel ==
Credits are adapted from the album's liner notes.

Starflyer 59

- Jason Martin – guitar, vocals
- Jeff Cloud – bass guitar
- Frank Lenz – drums

Production

- Jason Martin – recording (at The Black Hand)
- Aaron Sprinkle (Compound Recording, Seattle, WA) – mixing
- Troy Glessner (Spectre Studio, Seattle, WA) – mastering

Artwork

- Jason Martin – art direction
- Kris McCaddon – art direction, design

Management

- Brandon Ebel – executive producer
- Roy Culver – A&R
