= Lust for Gold (album) =

Studio album by Starflyer 59
- Released: August 16, 2024
- Studios: Room (Huntington Beach, CA)
- Genres: Shoegaze; indie rock; Christian rock
- Length: 37:30
- Label: Velvet Blue Music
- Producer: Jason Martin

Starflyer 59 chronology
Vanity (2021)	Lust for Gold (2024)	Déjame Dormir (2025)

Starflyer 59 studio albums chronology
Vanity (2021)	Lust for Gold (2024)

Singles from Lust for Gold
- 1. "909" Released: July 9, 2024

Physical cover

Lust for Gold is the seventeenth studio album by American alternative rock band Starflyer 59. It was released on August 16, 2024 by independent label Velvet Blue Music. The album returns to the shoegaze sound of Starflyer 59's first three studio albums, where the title is a play on words with Gold, their second studio album. Lust for Gold examines themes of melancholy and nostalgia, where each song covers "a thought of a moment or a memory in [band frontman Jason Martin's] life."

Vinyl and CD editions of Lust for Gold feature monochromatic cover art, where the digital cover is used on the rear side.

== Track listing ==
All songs written by Jason Martin.

Lust for Gold track listing
No.	Title	Length
1.	"909"	4:04
2.	"Lust for Gold"	4:50
3.	"My Lungs"	3:51
4.	"YZ80"	4:53
5.	"No Sweat"	6:47
6.	"1995"	4:42
7.	"Everyone Seems Strange"	4:16
8.	"The Breaks"	4:07
Total length:		37:30

== Personnel ==
Credits are adapted from the album's liner notes.

Starflyer 59

- Jason Martin – guitar, vocals
- Steven Dail – bass guitar
- Charlie Martin – drums, backing vocals
- Rob Withem – guitar, keyboards, backing vocals
- Frank Lenz – percussion, strings

Additional musicians

- Lydia Withem – piano

Production

- Bob Hoag – mixing
- Troy Glessner – mastering

Artwork

- Jason71 (Jason Pickersgill) – artwork and layout
- Lydia Withem – sketches

Management

- Jeff Cloud – executive producer

== Reception ==
Professional ratings
Review scores
Source	Rating
Jesusfreakhideout.com	5/5 stars 4.5/5 stars

Lust for Gold was listed as an honorable mention in The Gospel Coalition's Best Christian Music of 2024 list by Brett McCracken.
