= Ghosts of the Past (box set) =

Box set by Starflyer 59
- Released: July 28, 2009
- Genres: Indie rock; Christian rock
- Length: 99:08
- Label: Tooth & Nail
- Producer: Jason Martin

Starflyer 59 chronology
Dial M (2008)	Ghosts of the Past (2009)	The Changing of the Guard (2010)

Professional ratings
Review scores
Source	Rating
AllMusic	3.5/5 stars
CCM Magazine	3/5 stars
Cross Rhythms	6/10 squares

Ghosts of the Past is the third box set by alternative rock band Starflyer 59. It was released on July 28, 2009 by Tooth & Nail Records. Released on CD and digital download, it features second box set Ghosts of the Future (2007), (Note: Ghosts of the Future was recorded between February–August 2007. It is dedicated to the memory of band frontman Jason Martin's late father, John F. Martin, who had died that year.) a 10 record 7-inch vinyl series. Ghosts of the Future consists of demo and alternative versions of tracks found on eleventh studio album Dial M (2008), covers, and a remix of a track from tenth studio album My Island. Ghosts of the Past also features the sixth, seventh, and eight Starflyer 59 extended plays: The Last Laurel (2004), I Win (2006), and Minor Keys (2008). (Note: In addition, the Dial M vinyl and digital bonus track "Magic" is also included. "Softness, Goodness" (Rough Mix) from The Last Laurel and "I Win" from I Win are excluded—the former is found on ninth studio album Talking Voice vs. Singing Voice (as its final studio version), and the latter is found on tenth studio album My Island.)

== Track listing ==
All songs written by Jason Martin (except as noted).

Disc 1 (Ghosts of the Future)
No.	Title	Writer(s)	Length
1.	"Automatic"		3:53
2.	"Compulsion"	Joe Crow	3:46
3.	"Concentrate"		3:10
4.	"Pearl of Great Price" (Daniel Brigham Remix)		4:21
5.	"Minor Keys"		3:27
6.	"Please, Please, Please, Let Me Get What I Want"	Morrissey; Johnny Marr	1:48
7.	"Easy"		2:29
8.	"Spooky"		3:40
9.	"Mr. Martin"		3:24
10.	"Mr. Martin" (Acoustic Version)		3:10
11.	"I Love You Like the Little Bird"		3:47
12.	"Mall Monarchy"	Josephmary Barry; Sid Rainey; Jan-Willem Alkema; Garret Lee	2:55
13.	"m23"		3:22
14.	"Guitar Man"	David Ashworth Gates	3:46
15.	"Black Jacket"		4:03
16.	"Broken Arm"	David Bazan (Note: Bazan appears courtesy of Barsuk Records.); Jason Martin	2:34
17.	"Taxi"		2:41
18.	"Gangs of Riverside"		2:09
19.	"The Brightest of the Head"		3:34
20.	"Altercation"		3:15

Disc 2 (EPs and bonus track)
No.	Title	Writer(s)	Original album	Length
1.	"The Man Who Will Lead"		The Last Laurel	3:05
2.	"Thin As a Needle"		The Last Laurel	2:42
3.	"The Lucky Ones"		The Last Laurel	2:12
4.	"For Us"		The Last Laurel	1:36
5.	"White Fog"		I Win	2:21
6.	"Family Line"		I Win	2:42
7.	"W.S. 2005"		I Win	2:55
8.	"The Brightest of the Head" (Acoustic Version)		Minor Keys	3:34
9.	"I Love You Like the Little Bird" (Acoustic Version)		Minor Keys	4:20
10.	"Under the Milky Way"	Karin Gunilla Jansdotter Jansson; Steven John Kilbey	Minor Keys	4:32
11.	"Magic"		Dial M (vinyl and digital bonus track)	3:55
Total length:				99:08

== Personnel ==
Credits are adapted from the album's liner notes.

=== Disc 1 (Ghosts of the Future) ===
Starflyer 59

- Jason Martin
- Steven Dail
- Trey Many
- Trevor Monks
- Josh Dooley

Additional musicians

- Alex Albert
- David Bazan

Production

- Scott Hatch (Burnt Toast Vinyl, Philadelphia, PA) – executive producer

=== Disc 2 (EPs and bonus track) ===
Starflyer 59

- Jason Martin
- Frank Lenz
- Richard Swift
- Josh Dooley
- Steven Dail
- Trey Many

=== Ghosts of the Past general credits ===
Production

- Jason Martin – recording
- Troy Glessner (Spectre Studios, Seattle, WA) – mastering

Artwork

- Invisible Creature (Seattle, WA) – art direction
- Ryan Clark (Invisible Creature) – paper landscape, design
- Jerad Knudson – photography

Management

- Brandon Ebel – executive producer
- Jeff Carver – A&R
