= Fell in Love at 22 =

EP by Starflyer 59
- Released: February 23, 1999
- Genres: Shoegaze; pop rock; Christian rock
- Length: 26:33
- Label: Tooth & Nail
- Producer: Gene Eugene

Starflyer 59 chronology
The Fashion Focus (1998)	Fell in Love at 22 (1999)	Everybody Makes Mistakes (1999)

Professional ratings
Review scores
Source	Rating
AllMusic	2.5/5 stars
Pitchfork Media	8.5

Fell in Love at 22 is the third extended play by American alternative rock band Starflyer 59. It was released on February 23, 1999 by Tooth & Nail Records. It features the track "Fell in Love at 22" from fourth studio album The Fashion Focus, along with one new song from the sessions of third studio album Americana (being "Samson"), and three new songs from the sessions of The Fashion Focus.

== Track listing ==
All songs written by Jason Martin.

Fell in Love at 22 track listing
No.	Title	Length
1.	"Fell in Love at 22"	2:34
2.	"We Want It Bad"	4:06
3.	"E.P. Nights"	3:13
4.	"Traffic Jam"	14:12
5.	"Samson"	2:28
Total length:		26:33

== Personnel ==
Credits are adapted from the album's tray card notes.

Production

- Gene Eugene – production

Artwork

- Jason Parker – design and layout
