= Calico Sunset =

American electropop band

- Origin: Bakersfield, California
- Genres: Electropop
- Years active: 2003–2008
- Label: Velvet Blue Music
- Spinoffs: Fawns Of Love
- Members: Joseph Andreotti; Jenny Alvis
- Website: http://www.thecalicosunset.com

Calico Sunset is a Bakersfield, California-based electropop band, comprising Joseph Andreotti and Jenny Alvis. Calico Sunset is signed to Jeff Cloud's (Starflyer 59 and Joy Electric) Velvet Blue Music. Calico Sunset's debut album on VBM, "Deep Deep Paranoia," was produced by and featured Frank Lenz (Starflyer 59, Pedro the Lion, headphones) and featured Josh Dooley (MAP, Starflyer 59) on guitar. Shortly after the release of "Deep Deep Paranoia," Calico Sunset joined Joy Electric on a national tour. Calico Sunset has also shared the stage with such bands as Moving Units, The Fever, Starflyer 59, Freezepop, Broken Spindles (Joel from The Faint's solo project).

== Biography ==
Calico Sunset is a result of the union between Joseph and Jenny. Since joining, they have managed to create an eclectic breed of electropop. Not long after their formation, Calico Sunset found themselves playing a series of shows that resulted in their being signed to Jeff Cloud's (Starflyer 59 and Joy Electric) Velvet Blue Music label. Calico Sunset's debut album on VBM titled "Deep Deep Paranoia," was produced by Frank Lenz (Starflyer 59). "Deep Deep Paranoia" not only featured Lenz's producing and playing talents, but also featured Map's Josh Dooley on guitar. Shortly after the release of "Deep Deep Paranoia," Calico Sunset was asked to join Tooth and Nail veteran Joy Electric on a nationwide tour. After their last release title "If You Got It" (a self-released 7 inch) The Andreottis have been playing fewer shows, and as of January 1, 2008, their Myspace page has been deactivated, assuming they have broken up Calico Sunset. In 2013, They formed a new band called Fawns of Love. In 2019, They released an LP album called Permanent. As of 2025, They currently still play and active in Fawns of Love.

== Discography ==
=== Full Length albums ===
- Deep, Deep Paranoia (2004, Velvet Blue Music)

=== EPs ===
- Blue Balloon EP (2006, Velvet Blue Music)
- If You Got It EP (2007, Self-Released)

== Band members ==
- Jenny: Vocals
- Joseph : Synthesizer/backing vocals

== Guest Players ==
- Josh Dooley: Guitars/Vocals
