= Can't Stop Eating (EP) =

EP by Starflyer 59
- Released: October 8, 2002
- Genres: Pop rock; Christian rock
- Length: 18:10
- Label: Tooth & Nail
- Producers: Starflyer 59; Andy Prickett

Starflyer 59 chronology
Leave Here a Stranger (2001)	Can't Stop Eating (2002)	Old (2003)

Professional ratings
Review scores
Source	Rating
AllMusic	3/5 stars
Cross Rhythms	8/10 squares
Jesusfreakhideout.com	4/5 stars

Can't Stop Eating is the fourth extended play by American alternative rock band Starflyer 59. It was released on October 8, 2002 by Tooth & Nail Records. The album features three new songs, along with a stereo version of "Give Up the War" from sixth studio album Leave Here a Stranger, and a new version of "West Coast Friendship" from the first studio album of band frontman Jason Martin's side project Bon Voyage.

== Track listing ==
All songs written by Jason Martin (except for "Happy Birthday John," written by Damien Jurado).

Album release
No.	Title	Length
1.	"Compeating"	3:07
2.	"West Coast Friendship"	3:55
3.	"Happy Birthday John"	3:13
4.	"Give Up the War" (Stereo Mix)	4:50
5.	"Theme from Dronedary"	3:05
Total length:		18:10

== Personnel ==
Credits are adapted from the album's liner notes.

Starflyer 59

- Jason Martin – guitar, vocals
- Jeff Cloud – bass guitar
- Joey Esquibel – drums

Additional musicians

- Richard Swift – keyboards
- Andy Prickett – slide guitar (track 3)

Production

- Andy Prickett – recording, mixing, production
- Starflyer 59 – production

Artwork

- Asterik Studio (Seattle, WA) – design

Management

- Brandon Ebel – executive producer
