= Disappointed (EP) =

EP by Starflyer 59
- Released: July 31, 2026
- Recorded: Room (Huntington Beach, CA)
- Genres: Punk rock; noise rock; shoegaze
- Length: 7:46
- Label: Velvet Blue Music

Starflyer 59 chronology
Déjame Dormir (2025)	Disappointed (2026)

Singles from Disappointed
- 1. "I'm Disappointed" Released: May 9, 2026

Professional ratings
Review scores
Source	Rating
Jesusfreakhideout.com	4/5 stars
Saint Marie Records	7/10

Disappointed is the tenth extended play by American alternative rock band Starflyer 59. It was released on July 31, 2026 by Velvet Blue Music. Inspired by early punk rock bands like the Ramones, the album is single-length, featuring three new songs.

== Track listing ==
All songs written by Jason Martin.

Disappointed track listing
No.	Title	Length
1.	"I'm Disappointed"	2:18
2.	"I Wanna Disappear"	2:08
3.	"Trash"	3:20
Total length:		07:46

== Personnel ==
Credits are adapted from the album's cover notes.

Starflyer 59

- Jason Martin – guitar, vocals, keyboards
- Steven Dail – bass guitar
- Charlie Martin – drums

Artwork

- Jason71 (Jason Pickersgill) – artwork

Management

- Jeff Cloud – executive producer
