= Dial M (album) =

Studio album by Starflyer 59
- Released: October 28, 2008
- Genre: Indie rock; alternative rock; synth-pop; Christian rock
- Length: 34:32
- Label: Tooth & Nail
- Producer: Jason Martin

Starflyer 59 chronology
| My Island (2006) | Dial M (2008) | Ghosts of the Past (2009) |

Starflyer 59 studio albums chronology
| My Island (2006) | Dial M (2008) | The Changing of the Guard (2010) |

Dial M is the eleventh studio album by alternative rock band Starflyer 59. It was released on October 28, 2008 by Tooth & Nail Records. Dedicated to the memory of band frontman Jason Martin's late father, the album explores themes such as melancholy and Christian faith. Dial M features reworked versions of songs from second box set Ghosts of the Future.

Professional ratings
Review scores
| Source | Rating |
|---|---|
| Alternative Press | 3/5 |
| American Songwriter | 3/5 stars |
| Christianity Today | 4/5 stars |
| Cross Rhythms | 8/10 squares |
| Indie Vision Music | 7/10 |
| Jesusfreakhideout.com | 4/5 stars |

== Track listing ==
All songs written by Jason Martin.

Dial M track listing
| No. | Title | Length |
|---|---|---|
| 1. | "Minor Keys" | 3:24 |
| 2. | "The Brightest of the Head" | 3:32 |
| 3. | "Concentrate" | 3:10 |
| 4. | "Who Said It's Easy?" | 3:40 |
| 5. | "M23" | 3:25 |
| 6. | "Taxi" | 2:37 |
| 7. | "Automatic" | 3:53 |
| 8. | "Altercation" | 3:09 |
| 9. | "Mr. Martin" | 3:15 |
| 10. | "I Love You Like the Little Bird" | 4:27 |
| Total length: | | 34:32 |

Vinyl and digital bonus track
| No. | Title | Length |
|---|---|---|
| 11. | "Magic" | 3:55 |
| Total length: | | 38:27 |

== Personnel ==
Credits are adapted from the album's liner notes.

Starflyer 59

- Jason Martin – guitar, vocals, keyboards
- Steven Dail – bass guitar
- Trey Many – drums

Production

- Jason Martin – production, recording
- Steven Dail – recording
- J. R. McNeely – mixing
- Troy Glessner – mastering

Artwork

- Invisible Creature, Inc. (Seattle, WA) – art direction
- Don Clark (Invisible Creature, Inc.) – design

Management

- Jeff Carver – A&R
- Brandon Ebel – executive producer
