= IAMACEO =

Studio album by Starflyer 59
- Released: January 8, 2013
- Genre: Indie rock; Christian rock
- Length: 33:10
- Label: SouthCo (Note: Released independently, band frontman Jason Martin used the name and logo of his late father's trucking business (SouthCo Trucking) for the label. The trucking business was inherited by Martin and his brother Ronnie Martin of Joy Electric.)
- Producer: Starflyer 59

Starflyer 59 chronology
The Changing of the Guard (2010)	IAMACEO (2013)	Slow (2016)

Starflyer 59 studio albums chronology
The Changing of the Guard (2010)	IAMACEO (2013)	Slow (2016)

Professional ratings
Review scores
Source	Rating
Jesusfreakhideout.com	4/5 stars
The Fire Note	4.5/5 stars

IAMACEO is the thirteenth studio album by American alternative rock band Starflyer 59. It was released independently by band frontman Jason Martin through SouthCo Records on January 8, 2013.

== Track listing ==
All songs written by Jason Martin (except for "Red Tide", written by Jason Martin and Andrew Prickett).

IAMACEO track listing
No.	Title	Length
1.	"IAMACEO"	3:01
2.	"Bicycle Rider"	3:18
3.	"Is This All There Is?"	3:09
4.	"Open Hands"	3:09
5.	"Father John"	4:45
6.	"Red Tide"	3:32
7.	"Through My Door"	3:08
8.	"Pot of Gold"	2:41
9.	"I Feel Black"	3:33
10.	"My Light"	2:54
Total length:		33:10

== Personnel ==
Credits are adapted from the album's liner notes.

Starflyer 59

- Jason Martin – guitar, vocals, keyboards
- Steven Dail – bass guitar
- Trey Many – drums

Additional musicians

- Andy Prickett – guitar
- TW Walsh – guitar

Production

- Starflyer 59 – production
- Jason Martin – recording
- J. Rich – drum recording (Northern Studios)
- J. R. McNeely – mixing
- TW Walsh – mastering

Artwork

- Ryan Clark – artwork (Invisible Creature Inc., Seattle, WA)
- Jerad Knudson – photography
