= My Island =

Studio album by Starflyer 59
- Released: September 12, 2006
- Studio: El Mirage Studios
- Genres: Alternative rock; post-punk revival; Christian rock
- Length: 33:37
- Label: Tooth & Nail
- Producer: Jason Martin

Starflyer 59 chronology
| Never Play Covers (2005) | My Island (2006) | Dial M (2008) |

Starflyer 59 studio albums chronology
| Talking Voice vs. Singing Voice (2005) | My Island (2006) | Dial M (2008) |

Professional ratings
Review scores
| Source | Rating |
|---|---|
| AllMusic | 4/5 stars |
| Alternative Press | 5/5 |
| Christianity Today | 3.5/5 stars |
| Cross Rhythms | 8/10 squares |
| Jesusfreakhideout.com | 4.5/5 stars |
| PopMatters | 6 |

My Island is the tenth studio album by alternative rock band Starflyer 59. It was released on September 12, 2006 by Tooth & Nail Records.

A music video for "I Win" was released online to coincide with the album's release. This was the first video the band released since the video for "I Like Your Photographs", from the 2001 album Leave Here a Stranger.

== Track listing ==
All songs written by Jason Martin.

My Island track listing
| No. | Title | Length |
|---|---|---|
| 1. | "The Frontman" | 2:43 |
| 2. | "Nice Guy" | 5:12 |
| 3. | "I Win" | 3:05 |
| 4. | "Division" | 3:07 |
| 5. | "Mic the Mic" | 3:09 |
| 6. | "It's Alright Blondie" | 2:36 |
| 7. | "My Island" | 2:59 |
| 8. | "Pearl of Great Price" | 3:42 |
| 9. | "Lifeguard" | 3:46 |
| 10. | "Ideas for the Talented" | 3:19 |
| Total length: | | 33:37 |

== Personnel ==
Credits are adapted from the album's liner notes.

Starflyer 59

- Jason Martin – guitar, vocals
- Josh Dooley – guitar, keyboards
- Steven Dail – bass guitar
- Trevor Monks – drums
- Trey Many – drums

Production

- Jason Martin – recording, production
- Steven Dail – recording assistance
- Ken Andrews – mixing
- Troy Glessner (Spectre Studios, Seattle, WA) – mastering

Artwork

- Asterik Studio (Seattle, WA) – art direction and design

Management

- Brandon Ebel – executive producer
- Jeff Carver – A&R
