= Slow (Starflyer 59 album) =

Studio album by Starflyer 59
- Released: June 17, 2016
- Genre: Indie rock; shoegaze; lo-fi
- Length: 32:07
- Label: Tooth & Nail
- Producer: Jason Martin

Starflyer 59 chronology
IAMACEO (2013)	Slow (2016)	Young in My Head (2019)

Starflyer 59 studio albums chronology
IAMACEO (2013)	Slow (2016)	Young in My Head (2019)

Slow (stylized as SLOW) is the fourteenth studio album by American alternative rock band Starflyer 59. It was released on June 17, 2016 by Tooth & Nail Records.

== Track listing ==
All songs written by Jason Martin.

Slow track listing
No.	Title	Length
1.	"Slow"	5:13
2.	"Told Me So"	3:30
3.	"Cherokee"	3:48
4.	"Hi Low"	4:42
5.	"Wrongtime"	4:30
6.	"Retired"	3:20
7.	"Runaround"	2:23
8.	"Numb"	4:41
Total length:		32:07

== Personnel ==
Credits are adapted from the album's cover notes.

Starflyer 59

- Jason Martin – guitar, vocals, piano
- Steven Dail – bass guitar
- Trey Many – drums

Additional musicians

- Amanda Cook – acoustic guitar on "Wrong Time"

Production

- Jason Martin – production
- J. R. McNeely – mixing
- Troy Glessner – mastering

Artwork

- Ryan Clark (Invisible Creature) – artwork

Management

- Brandon Ebel – executive producer

== Critical reception ==
Professional ratings
Review scores
Source	Rating
AllMusic	3/5 stars
CCM Magazine	5/5 stars
Jesusfreakhideout.com	4/5 stars
New Release Today	3.5/5 stars

Tim Sendra writes, "Since the album is so short, and since he does try to be something else, it makes for one of the least satisfying of Starflyer 59's many albums." Andy Argyrakis describes, "the Jason Martin-led act not only returns to Tooth & Nail Records, but also turns in another textbook batch of its lo-fi atmospheres and melodic textures that could fit right in alongside any current band on Pitchfork’s tastemaking playlists. Lyrically speaking, the guys sound older, wiser and at their most reflective, sure to be another sticking point for their extremely dedicated fan base and also a thought-provoking entry point for the hipster kids coming up." Jonathan J. Francesco states, "The songs probe deep themes of love and nostalgia, of regret and the past. The vocals are subdued and relaxed, and the music is a laid-back rock that has just enough energy to propel things along. The two make for a haunting mix that is definitely something I am curious to explore more on repeat listens, and also to take a second look at the band's past albums."

Bersain Beristain says, "Slow makes no fault at all. It's not solely dependent on one side of Starflyer 59's many colorful faces, but rather, it allows us to see them all with balance. Sure, it doesn't reinvent the band to catapult them into the glory days of their metallic albums, but it does well what it sought out to do. In a time where [sic] indie rock is stagnating compared to the growth it saw in the first decade of the millennium, Martin reminds me that not only is there hope for the genre, but more importantly, for Starflyer 59 itself." Michael Weaver responds, "he most certainly has 'so much left to give.'" Mark Rice calls, "it a highly refreshing, highly enjoyable (and even thoughtful) listen." Scott Fryberger mentions, "Slow is a solid way to return from a short break."

== Charts ==
Chart (2016)	Peak position
US Top Christian Albums (Billboard)	24
US Heatseekers Albums (Billboard)	17
