= Vanity (Starflyer 59 album) =

Studio album by Starflyer 59
- Released: October 14, 2021
- Genre: Indie rock
- Length: 35:52
- Label: Velvet Blue Music
- Producer: TW Walsh

Starflyer 59 chronology
Miami (2020)	Vanity (2021)	Lust for Gold (2024)

Starflyer 59 studio albums chronology
Young in My Head (2019)	Vanity (2021)	Lust for Gold (2024)

Singles from Vanity
- 1. "Life in Bed" Released: June 11, 2021; 2. "Like to Lose" Released: July 9, 2021; 3. "Sunrise" Released: August 20, 2021

Physical cover
- In Search of Vanity

Professional ratings
Review scores
Source	Rating
Jesusfreakhideout.com	4.5/5 stars

Vanity (also called In Search of Vanity) is the sixteenth studio album by American alternative rock band Starflyer 59. It was released on October 14, 2021 by independent label Velvet Blue Music. Physical editions of Vanity use the title In Search of Vanity for the cover art, and Vanity on the media itself.

== Track listing ==
All songs written by Jason Martin (except for "Ya Right," written by Jason Martin and Charlie Martin).

Vanity track listing
No.	Title	Length
1.	"Asunder"	1:46
2.	"Life in Bed"	4:57
3.	"Crossroads"	5:31
4.	"Ya Right"	3:41
5.	"Respect"	3:27
6.	"Like to Lose"	5:12
7.	"Sunrise"	4:16
8.	"New Guitar"	2:13
9.	"Hey, John"	4:49
Total length:		35:52

== Personnel ==
Credits are adapted from the album's cover notes.

Starflyer 59

- Jason Martin – guitar, keyboards, vocals, piano
- Steven Dail – bass guitar
- Charlie Martin – drums
- TW Walsh – bass guitar, percussion, synthesizer, organ, guitar

Additional musicians

- R. Merrit – trumpet
- N. Walsh – saxophone

Production

- TW Walsh – production, mixing

Artwork

- Bruce Licher (Independent Project Press, Bishop, CA) – design

Management

- Jeff Cloud – executive producer
