= Bon Voyage (band) =

- Origin: Aliso Viejo, California
- Genres: Synthpop, Shoegazing
- Years active: 1995-present
- Labels: Velvet Blue, BEC, Tooth & Nail
- Members: Julie Martin; Jason Martin

Bon Voyage is a musical duo consisting of Jason Martin of Starflyer 59 and his wife, Julie.

== History ==
The duo first appeared in 1995 when they released Issue 1, a 7" recording on Jeff Cloud's record label Velvet Blue Music. They appeared again in 1996 when they released a follow-up 7", Issue 2.

By 1998, Bon Voyage had signed on to BEC Records to release their first CD, entitled Bon Voyage.

The group dropped off until 2002 when Tooth & Nail Records released The Right Amount. The group worked with Tooth & Nail again to release their 2008 album Lies.

== Members ==
Core members

- Julie Martin - vocals
- Jason Martin - guitar

Additional members

- Steve Dail – bass
- Mike Perez - synthesizer, drum programming

Former members

- Ronnie Martin - synthesizers (2002)
- Richard Swift - keys (2002)
- Gene Eugene – keys (1998)
- Matt McCartie – drums (1998)
- Travis Zimmerman – bass (1998)
- Carlos Colon - synthesizers (live) (1998)
- Joey Esquibel - drums (live) (1998)

== Discography ==
=== Studio albums ===
- Bon Voyage (1998)
- The Right Amount (2002)
- Lies (2008)

=== Singles ===
- Issue 1 (7") (1995)
- Issue II (7") (1996)

=== Compilations ===
- Caribbean Sea (Demo) Velvet Blue Music - 12 Song Sampler (1997)
- Holly Jolly Christmas Happy Christmas (1998)
- The Little Christmas Tree Happy Christmas Vol. 5 (2010)
