= Can't Stop Eating =

Can't Stop Eating may refer to:

- Can't Stop Eating (EP), a 2002 EP by Starflyer 59
- Can't Stop Eating (film), a 2006 documentary film
