= Allalom Music =

American independent record label

- Founded: 2001
- Founder: Samuel Aaron Thomas
- Defunct: 2010
- Genre: Pop, alternative rock
- Country of origin: U.S.
- Location: Portland, Oregon

Allalom Music was an American independent record label founded in 2001. It mainly released indie pop and alternative music. Founded in Redmond, Oregon, it had its headquarters in South Texas before moving back to Portland, Oregon in the fall of 2005. On January 15, 2010, the label announced their closure.

== Artists ==
- Agents of Future (2007–2010)
- The Beauty (2008–2010)
- Christopher & The Lion (2007–2008)
- Jared Colinger (2004–2007)
- Daddyboy (2006–2010)
- Daniel Folmer (2007–2010)
- Mansic (2004–2005)
- Pacifico (2006–2010)
- The Red Balloons (2006)
- Seven Dynasties of Glass Children (2004–2008)
- Yes, You Are Ferocious! (2008–2010)

=== Distributed artists ===
- Deep Mosey
- The Kingdom Is Moving!
- Monday In London

== Notable artists ==
- The Broadway Hush
- The Cloves
- The Divorce
- Dolour
- Kat Jones
- Pilgrims
- The Professional Americans
- Sacha Sacket
- Tess Wiley

== Albums ==
=== Official ===
- Mansic - The Loving Father (AM-002, Summer 2004)
- Jared Colinger - Favourite Hallucination EP (AM-004, Summer 2006)
- Pacifico - Anthology (AM-005, Winter 2006)
- Pacifico - Side B:Rarities & Covers (AM-005B, Winter 2006)
- Daddyboy - A Lovely Day (AM-006, Spring 2007)
- Jared Colinger - Light From A Dying Star EP (AM-008, Summer 2007)
- Christopher & The Lion / Daniel Folmer - Born To Movement, Vol. One Split (AM-009, Spring 2008)
- Pacifico - Facedown EP (AM-010, Summer 2008)
- Yes, You Are Ferocious! - The Effects of Nuclear Weapons (AM-011, Spring 2009)
- Pacifico - Thin Skin & An Open Heart (AM-012, Fall 2009)

=== Distributed ===
- Deep Mosey - Vis A Tergo (AMPR-001)
- Jared colinger - The Summer EP (AMPR-002)
- Monday In London - Self Titled EP (AMPR-003)

== Compilations ==
- Various Artists - Everybody Needs Love (AM-001, Spring 2004)
- Various Artists - We Make Our Own Mistakes, Volume One (AM-003, Spring 2006)
- Various Artists - TOMFest Sampler / ClerestoryAV split (CAVAM-001, Aug 2006)
- Various Artists - Establishing The Anti-Establishment (AM-007, Summer 2007)
- Various Artists - TOMFest Sampler II (AM----, Summer 2007)
- Various Artists - TOMFest Sampler III (AM-D01, Summer 2008)

== Loserbroadcasting ==
At one point in time Allalom Music owned and operated Loserbroadcasting.com, a netlabel that offered full album downloads from various bands around the US for free...this project never achieved the level of success they were looking for and the website was taken offline after less than a year. Two of the bands/albums from that project have been released as official CDs since the site went down.

All the albums available for download were designated "AM/LB-001", and they only got different numbers if they were released on CD.

== Albums released on Loserbroadcasting ==
- Anaphylaxis - Reverb EP (AM/LB-001, Spring 2005)
- Stereo Deluxx - Pretty Time Bomb (AM/LB-001, Spring 2005)
- Jared Colinger - The Darker Side of Happy EP (AM/LB-002, Summer 2005)
- Seven Dynasties of Glass Children - We Are Pretentious, Who Are You (AM/LB-003, Fall 2006)
- Seven Dynasties of Glass Children - The Fall of Vaudeville (AM/LB-004, Spring 2007)

== See also ==
- List of record labels
