= Easy Come, Easy Go (Starflyer 59 album) =

Box set by Starflyer 59
- Released: November 21, 2000
- Genre: Shoegaze; pop rock; Christian rock
- Length: 124:42
- Label: Tooth & Nail

Starflyer 59 chronology
Everybody Makes Mistakes (1999)	Easy Come, Easy Go (2000)	Leave Here a Stranger (2001)

Professional ratings
Review scores
Source	Rating
AllMusic	3/5 stars
Cross Rhythms	6/10 squares
Pitchfork Media	7.8

Easy Come, Easy Go is the first box set by alternative rock band Starflyer 59. It was released on November 21, 2000 by Tooth & Nail Records. The album liner notes features The Story of Starflyer 59, a band history biography from J. Edward Keyes. The album is dedicated "in loving memory of the late, great Gene Eugene."

== Track listing ==
All songs written by Jason Martin (except for "Shedding the Mortal Coil," written by Terry Scott Taylor, Mark Cook, and Jerry Chamberlain). Track listing notes are adapted from the album's liner notes.

Disc 1 (Best Of)
No.	Title	Length
1.	"Blue Collar Love" (from Silver, 1994)	4:04
2.	"Monterey" (from Silver, 1994)	3:00
3.	"Hazelwould (Note: This track uses the spelling "Hazel Would" on the original 1994 release of Silver and its 2005 extended edition.)" (from Silver, 1994)	2:54
4.	"A Housewife Love Song" (from Gold, 1995)	4:12
5.	"Duel Overhead Cam" (from Gold, 1995)	4:38
6.	"You're Mean" (from Gold, 1995)	2:05
7.	"The Voyager" (from Americana, 1997)	4:37
8.	"The Hearttaker" (from Americana, 1997)	4:06
9.	"Harmony" (from Americana, 1997)	4:21
10.	"I Drive a Lot" (from The Fashion Focus, 1998)	3:14
11.	"We're the Ordinary" (from The Fashion Focus, 1998)	4:13
12.	"Fell in Love at 22" (from The Fashion Focus, 1998)	2:32
13.	"Play the C Chord" (from Everybody Makes Mistakes, 1999)	4:15
14.	"No New Kinda Story" (from Everybody Makes Mistakes, 1999)	3:49
15.	"20 Dollar Bills" (from Everybody Makes Mistakes, 1999)	2:12

Disc 2 (B-sides & Rarities section)
No.	Title	Length
1.	"I Was 17" (outtake from Americana, 1997)	3:53
2.	"All Done Wrong" (outtake from Everybody Makes Mistakes, 1999)	3:26
3.	"Elijah the Prophet" (outtake from Americana, 1997 (Note: "Elijah the Prophet" was also an outtake from the 1999 The Fashion Focus 7-inch single (A-side).))	4:22
4.	"When No One Calls (It Will Be Alright)" (from Le Vainqueur EP, 1995 (Note: "When No One Calls (It Will Be Alright)" was originally an outtake from 1995 studio album Gold. The official compilation title for this track incorrectly excludes the title parenthesis as found on the 1995 Le Vainqueur EP and 2005 extended edition of Gold.))	3:17
5.	"Next Time Around" (from Goodbyes Are Sad 7-inch single, 1995 (Note: "Next Time Around" was originally an outtake from 1995 studio album Gold.))	5:19
6.	"Goodbyes Are Sad" (from Goodbyes Are Sad 7-inch single, 1995 (Note: "Goodbyes Are Sad" was originally an outtake from 1995 studio album Gold.))	3:50
7.	"She Was My Sweetheart (Note: This track uses the spelling "She Was My Sweet Heart" on the 1994 She's the Queen EP and 2005 extended edition of Silver.)" (from She's the Queen EP, 1994)	3:46
8.	"Everyone but Me" (Demo 1997 (Note: The studio version of "Everyone but Me" is found on 1997 studio album Americana.))	2:39
9.	"Wherever You Go (1st. Space Song) (Note: The official compilation title for this track incorrectly uses "First" (instead of the grammatical style "1st.") with regard to the track "2nd. Space Song" as found on the original 1994 release of Silver and its 2005 extended edition.)" (Gold Demo)	3:51
10.	"Shedding the Mortal Coil" (outtake from Everybody Makes Mistakes, 1999 (Note: This track was also featured on When Worlds Collide: A Tribute to Daniel Amos.))	1:33
11.	"Samson" (from Fell in Love at 22 EP, 1999 (Note: "Samson" was originally an outtake from 1997 studio album Americana.))	2:27
12.	"Prepare to Detour" (from Everybody Makes Mistakes 7-inch single, 1999 (Note: "Prepare to Detour" was originally intended as a companion track to "Traffic Jam," which was released on the 1999 Fell in Love at 22 EP.))	3:30

Disc 2 (Live section)
No.	Title	Length
13.	"I Drive a Lot" (Live)	2:50
14.	"Traffic Jam" (Live)	3:36
15.	"Play the C Chord" (Live)	3:53
16.	"Help Me When You're Gone" (Live)	4:52
17.	"Card Games and Old Friends" (Live)	3:12
18.	"Shut Your Mouth" (Live)	2:48
19.	"No New Kinda Story" (Live)	3:34
20.	"When You Feel the Mess" (Live)	4:44
Total length:		124:42

== Personnel ==
Credits are adapted from the album's liner notes.

Production

- J. Edward Keyes – band history biography

Artwork

- Cory Paul Little – design and layout
- Tim Owen – photos
- Karen Mason – photos
- Brandon Ebel – photos
- Matt Wignall – photos
- Anthony Saint James – photos

Management

- Brandon Ebel – executive producer
