= Le Vainqueur =

EP by Starflyer 59
- Released: September 13, 1995
- Genres: Shoegaze; indie rock; Christian rock
- Length: 18:04
- Label: Tooth & Nail
- Producer: Jason Martin

Starflyer 59 chronology
Starflyer 59 (Gold) (1995)	Le Vainqueur (1995)	Americana (1997)

Professional ratings
Review scores
Source	Rating
AllMusic	2.5/5 stars
Cross Rhythms	8/10 squares

Le Vainqueur is the second extended play by American alternative rock band Starflyer 59. It was released on September 13, 1995 by Tooth & Nail Records. Taken from the sessions of second studio album Gold, it features two new songs, where the third track "The Starflyer 2000 Reprise" is a reworked version of "Leigh and Me," featured on the 1995 Tooth & Nail compilation album Art Core: Volume One. (Note: The original name of Starflyer 59 was "Starflyer 2000," prior to being renamed.)

== Artwork ==
The album title is French, which translates into English as "The Conqueror" (referring to Jesus). Connecting with the name of the EP, the front cover has a reference to Jude 13–15:

wild waves of the sea, casting up their own shame like foam; wandering stars, for whom the black darkness has been reserved forever. It was also about these men that Enoch, in the seventh generation from Adam, prophesied, saying, "Behold, the Lord came with many thousands of His holy ones, to execute judgment upon all, and to convict all the ungodly of all their ungodly deeds which they have done in an ungodly way, and of all the harsh things which ungodly sinners have spoken against Him." (NASB1995)

== Track listing ==
All songs written by Jason Martin.

Le Vainqueur track listing
No.	Title	Length
1.	"Le Vainqueur" (Radio Edit)	4:25
2.	"When No One Calls (It Will Be Alright)"	3:20
3.	"The Starflyer 2000 Reprise"	4:10
4.	"Le Vainqueur"	6:09
Total length:		18:04

== Personnel ==
Credits are adapted from the album's cover notes.

Starflyer 59

- Jason Martin – guitar, vocals, drums (tracks 2–3)
- Andrew Larson – bass guitar
- Wayne Everett – drums (tracks 1, 4) (Note: Everett appears courtesy of Reunion Records.)

Production

- Jason Martin – production
- Bob Moon – engineering

Artwork

- Karen Mason – photography
- Jason Pickersgill – imaging

Management

- Brandon Ebel – executive producer
