= Young in My Head =

Studio album by Starflyer 59
- Released: April 26, 2019
- Studio: Le Shed (Huntington Beach, CA)
- Genre: Alternative rock; dream pop; new wave
- Length: 34:55
- Label: Tooth & Nail
- Producer: Jason Martin

Starflyer 59 chronology
Slow (2016)	Young in My Head (2019)	Miami (2020)

Starflyer 59 studio albums chronology
Slow (2016)	Young in My Head (2019)	Vanity (2021)

Young in My Head is the fifteenth studio album by American alternative rock band Starflyer 59. It was released on April 26, 2019 by Tooth & Nail Records.

== Track listing ==
All songs written by Jason Martin.

Young in My Head track listing
No.	Title	Length
1.	"Hey, Are You Listening?"	3:04
2.	"Young in My Head"	3:40
3.	"Not That I Want To"	3:34
4.	"Cry"	3:39
5.	"Remind Me"	3:37
6.	"Smoke"	3:49
7.	"Wicked Trick"	3:23
8.	"Junk"	3:14
9.	"Cain"	3:33
10.	"Crash"	3:22
Total length:		34:55

== Personnel ==
Credits are adapted from the album's cover notes.

Starflyer 59

- Jason Martin – guitar, vocals
- Steven Dail – bass guitar
- Charlie Martin – drums

Additional musicians

- TW Walsh – keyboards

Production

- J. R. McNeely – mixing
- TW Walsh – mastering

Artwork

- Jason Martin – art direction
- Ryan Clark – art direction, design (Invisible Creature; Seattle, WA)

== Reception ==
Professional ratings
Review scores
Source	Rating
AllMusic	3/5 stars
Jesusfreakhideout.com	4.5/5 stars

The album was listed as one of the top 15 indie albums of 2019 by Thomas Leahy in the Athol Daily News.
