= Jared Colinger =

American songwriter and musician

The Enigmatic Foe (Jared Colinger)
- Also known as: Jared C
- Origin: Tennessee, U.S.
- Genres: Indie pop, rock, new wave
- Years active: 2001 – present
- Labels: none
- Members: Jared Colinger
- Website: https://enigmaticfoe.bandcamp.com/

Jared Michael Colinger is a songwriter and musician based in Tennessee. He has recorded with Frank Lenz, Josh Dooley (of Map), Jason Martin (of Starflyer 59), Ronnie Martin (of Joy Electric), Mike Perez, Laurel Dye, Alwyn Wright, Ina Veli, Brianna Brandy, and Ginger Murphy. Originally in Eastern Tennessee he moved to the west coast in early 2007 to tour more and continue his recording. From 2004 through 2007 he was marketed, distributed and managed by ALLALOM Music.

He announced on his Myspace in January 2008 that he was moving back to Tennessee and has broken ties with ALLALOM Music to pursue things independently. A year later in early 2009, Colinger adopted the collective band name, The Enigmatic Foe, after one of his songs.

== Discography ==
- The Darker Side of Happy EP (2005, LOSERbroadcasting/ALLALOM Music)
- Favourite Hallucination EP (2006, ALLALOM Music)
- The Summer EP (2007, ALLALOM Music), a free EP at shows, very limited release
- Light from a Dying Star EP (2007, ALLALOM Music, 2008, self-release, iTunes) - 100 copies of an advanced (quoted "special edition") CD was released through ALLALOM Music. then released officially in 2008 with "The Enigmatic Foe" on the cover instead of the original "Jared Colinger".
- Beautiful Liar (2008, self-release)
- Black (2009, self-release)
- Daughters and Daggers (2015, self-release)

Compilations

- Pop Komm (2004, IRL Music)
- Start The Music Compilation, Vol. 7 (2005, Velvet Blue Music)
- We Make Our Own Mistakes, Vol. One (2006, ALLALOM Music)
- TOMFest Sampler, I (2006, ClerestoryAV/ALLALOM Music)
- Eartaste Sample (2007, Eartaste.com)
- TOMFest Sampler II (2007, ALLALOM Music)
