= Miami (EP) =

EP by Starflyer 59
- Released: June 19, 2020
- Studios: Le Shed (Huntington Beach, CA)
- Genres: Indie rock; shoegaze
- Length: 19:07
- Label: Velvet Blue Music

Starflyer 59 chronology
Young in My Head (2019)	Miami (2020)	Vanity (2021)

Professional ratings
Review scores
Source	Rating
Indie Vision Music	4/5
Jesusfreakhideout.com	5/5 stars

Miami is the ninth extended play by American alternative rock band Starflyer 59. It was released on June 19, 2020 by Velvet Blue Music. The album features three new tracks from the sessions of fifteenth studio album Young in My Head, along with alternative versions of the tracks "Cry" and "Crash" from the same album.

== Track listing ==
All songs written by Jason Martin.

Miami track listing
No.	Title	Length
1.	"Miami"	3:58
2.	"This Recliner"	3:47
3.	"CV2 (Note: This track stands for "Crash" (Version 2), being an alternative version of "Crash" from Young in My Head.)"	3:38
4.	"Once More"	4:11
5.	"Bored (Note: This track is an alternative version of "Cry" from Young in My Head.)"	3:33
Total length:		19:07

== Personnel ==
Credits are adapted from the album's cover notes.

Starflyer 59

- Jason Martin – guitar, keyboards, vocals
- Steven Dail – bass guitar
- Trey Many – drums
- Charlie Martin – drums (track 2)

Additional musicians

- Sadie Martin – backing vocals (track 5)

Production

- J. R. McNeely – mixing
- TW Walsh – mastering

Artwork

- Ryan Clark – artwork

Management

- Jeff Cloud – executive producer
