= The Changing of the Guard (album) =

Studio album by Starflyer 59
- Released: August 10, 2010
- Genre: Indie rock; alternative rock; pop rock; Christian rock
- Length: 32:26
- Label: Tooth & Nail
- Producer: Jason Martin

Starflyer 59 chronology
Ghosts of the Past (2009)	The Changing of the Guard (2010)	IAMACEO (2013)

Starflyer 59 studio albums chronology
Dial M (2008)	The Changing of the Guard (2010)	IAMACEO (2013)

The Changing of the Guard is the twelfth studio album by alternative rock band Starflyer 59. It was released on August 10, 2010 by Tooth & Nail Records.

The album was produced by Jason Martin and mixed by JR McNeely. Test vinyl pressings of the album, limited to 25 copies, went on sale on June 16 and were mailed on July 17, 2010, in white vinyl. All pressings of the album came in a deluxe gatefold LP format, accompanied by a 7-inch record with two bonus tracks. The final copies of the official pressing was released on coloured vinyl, as opposed to the plain-coloured copies of the main production run.

Professional ratings
Review scores
Source	Rating
AllMusic	3.5/5 stars
Christianity Today	4/5 stars
Cokemachineglow.com	72%
Consequence of Sound	3.5/5 stars
Jesusfreakhideout.com	3.5/5 stars 4.5/5 stars

== Track listing ==
All songs written by Jason Martin.

The Changing of the Guard track listing
No.	Title	Length
1.	"Fun is Fun"	2:50
2.	"Shane"	4:06
3.	"Time Machine"	2:48
4.	"Trucker's Son"	3:15
5.	"The Morning Rise / Frightening Eyes"	3:19
6.	"I Had a Song for the Ages"	3:26
7.	"Coconut Trees"	3:30
8.	"C.M.A.R. (Note: C.M.A.R. stands for "Cry Me a River".)"	3:02
9.	"Kick the Can"	2:48
10.	"Lose My Mind"	3:21
Total length:		32:26

== Personnel ==
Credits are adapted from the album's liner notes.

Starflyer 59

- Jason Martin – guitar, vocals, keyboards
- Steven Dail – bass guitar
- David Brotherton – drums, percussion

Production

- Jason Martin – recording, production
- Steven Dail – recording assistance
- J. R. McNeely – mixing
- Troy Glessner – mastering

Artwork

- Invisible Creature (Seattle, WA) – art direction
- Ryan Clark (Invisible Creature) – design

Management

- Jeff Carver – A&R
- Brandon Ebel – executive producer
