= The Brothers Martin =

American indie rock band

- Origin: Riverside, California, US
- Genres: Indie rock, electronica, indietronica, electropop, shoegazing, new wave
- Years active: 2006–2008
- Label: Tooth & Nail
- Members: Ronnie Martin; Jason Martin

The Brothers Martin were an indie rock band from Riverside, California consisting of brothers Ronnie Martin and Jason Martin. Musically, they incorporate elements of both Joy Electric and Starflyer 59 (Ronnie and Jason's primary music projects, respectively): electropop and shoegazing, while modern rock and 1980s new wave are also a central influence.

As of November 2008, the band was dropped from the "Current Artists" section of the Tooth & Nail website. While there has never been any word from the Martin brothers, it is assumed that The Brothers Martin was a one-time project.

== Members ==
Official

- Ronnie Martin - synthesizers, lead vocals
- Jason Martin - bass, guitar, lead vocals

Session & Live

- Alex Albert - drums

== Success ==
Almost instantly after their first appearance at PureVolume, The Brothers Martin became the site's No. 1 artist, topping My Chemical Romance and Anberlin and were also the site's featured artist.

"The Missionary" was played at the end of the series premiere of NBC television show Chuck.

== Discography ==
Title	Release date	Label
The Brothers Martin	January 23, 2007	Tooth & Nail Records

== See also ==
- Dance House Children
