= She's the Queen =

EP by Starflyer 59
- Released: November 4, 1994
- Genres: Shoegaze; indie rock
- Length: 28:15
- Label: Tooth & Nail
- Producer: Blood (Note: Blood was a collective pseudonym for Jyro Xhan and Jerome Fontamillas, along with Mark Rodriguez.)

Starflyer 59 chronology
Starflyer 59 (Silver) (1994)	She's the Queen (1994)	Starflyer 59 (Gold) (1995)

Professional ratings
Review scores
Source	Rating
AllMusic	2.5/5 stars
Jesusfreakhideout.com	4/5 stars

She's the Queen is the first extended play by American alternative rock band Starflyer 59. It was released on November 4, 1994 by Tooth & Nail Records. Being a companion of 1994 debut studio album Silver, the album was featured as bonus tracks on its 2005 extended, remastered edition.

== Track listing ==
All songs written by Jason Martin (except for "Canary Row", written by Andrew Larson and Jason Martin).

She's the Queen track listing
No.	Title	Length
1.	"She's the Queen"	3:23
2.	"She Was My Sweet Heart"	3:48
3.	"Blue Collar Love" (Joy Electric Dub Mix)	3:56
4.	"Monterey" (Lounge Version)	4:47
5.	"Canary Row"	2:52
6.	"Salinas"	2:51
7.	"The Drop"	2:26
8.	"Droned" (In Love Version)	4:12
Total length:		28:15

== Personnel ==
Credits are adapted from the album's liner notes.

Starflyer 59

- Jason Martin – guitar, drums, vocals
- Andrew Larson – bass guitar

Additional musicians

- Ed Giles Bedrock – drums (tracks 4, 8)

Production

- Blood – production (tracks 1, 5–7)
- Jason Martin – production (tracks 2, 4, 8)
- Ronnie Martin – production (track 3)
- Bob Moon – engineering

Artwork

- Brandon Ebel – layout and art direction
- Linda Schellack – artwork star
- Jason Pickersgill – cover logo
- Matt Wignall – band photo

Management

- Brandon Ebel – executive producer, A&R
