= Everybody Makes Mistakes (Starflyer 59 album) =

Studio album by Starflyer 59
- Released: November 16, 1999
- Recorded: June–August 1999
- Genre: Indie rock; dream pop; pop rock; new wave
- Length: 40:37
- Label: Tooth & Nail
- Producer: Gene Eugene

Starflyer 59 chronology
| Fell in Love at 22 (1999) | Everybody Makes Mistakes (1999) | Easy Come, Easy Go (2000) |

Starflyer 59 studio albums chronology
| The Fashion Focus (1998) | Everybody Makes Mistakes (1999) | Leave Here a Stranger (2001) |

Alternate cover

Professional ratings
Review scores
| Source | Rating |
|---|---|
| AllMusic | 4.5/5 stars |
| Jesusfreakhideout.com | 4/5 stars |
| Pitchfork Media | 7.8 |

Everybody Makes Mistakes is the fifth studio album by alternative rock band Starflyer 59. It was released on November 16, 1999 by Tooth & Nail Records. For this album, the band continued to develop its sound in the same direction that they had taken for their previous release, The Fashion Focus. The song "Play the C Chord" would become the most common song to appear on their live releases.

The CD artwork (both cover and tray) was released in two versions, which can be reversed into each other. The primary variant is white and black on yellow, and the alternate variant is yellow and black on white.

== Track listing ==
All songs written by Jason Martin.

Everybody Makes Mistakes track listing
| No. | Title | Length |
|---|---|---|
| 1. | "Play the C Chord" | 4:16 |
| 2. | "No New Kinda Story" | 3:49 |
| 3. | "20 Dollar Bills" | 2:13 |
| 4. | "No More Shows" | 2:38 |
| 5. | "Just Try" | 3:06 |
| 6. | "My Name" | 3:14 |
| 7. | "A Dethroned King" | 4:48 |
| 8. | "Going Places" | 4:25 |
| 9. | "The Party" (includes hidden track after 9:50) | 12:08 |
| Total length: | | 40:37 |

== Personnel ==
Credits are adapted from the album's liner notes.

Starflyer 59

- Jason Martin – guitar, vocals
- Jeff Cloud – bass guitar
- Wayne Everett – drums
- Gene Eugene – keyboards

Production

- Gene Eugene – production
- Brandon Ebel – executive producer

Artwork

- Jason Gnewikow (PUBLIC Studio, Chicago, IL) – art direction and design
