= Talking Voice vs. Singing Voice =

Studio album by Starflyer 59
- Released: April 12, 2005
- Genres: Indie rock; shoegaze; Christian rock
- Length: 32:06
- Label: Tooth & Nail
- Producer: Starflyer 59

Starflyer 59 chronology
I Am the Portuguese Blues (2004)	Talking Voice vs. Singing Voice (2005)	Never Play Covers (2005)

Starflyer 59 studio albums chronology
I Am the Portuguese Blues (2004)	Talking Voice vs. Singing Voice (2005)	My Island (2006)

Professional ratings
Review scores
Source	Rating
AllMusic	4/5 stars
Christianity Today	4.5/5 stars
Jesusfreakhideout.com	5/5 stars
Pitchfork	7.2
PopMatters	7
Punknews.org	3.5/5 stars

Talking Voice vs. Singing Voice is the ninth studio album by alternative rock band Starflyer 59. It was released on April 12, 2005, by Tooth & Nail Records.

== Critical reception ==
Exclaim! wrote: "Making above average, semplice rock for 12 years, Starflyer 59 haven't really changed much." Paste wrote that "the vocal monotony truly is a shame because [Jason] Martin's compositions are often warmly seductive."

== Track listing ==
All songs written by Jason Martin.

Talking Voice vs. Singing Voice track listing
No.	Title	Length
1.	"The Contest Completed"	3:38
2.	"Easy Street"	3:43
3.	"Good Sons"	2:49
4.	"A Lists Go On"	3:21
5.	"Night Life"	4:26
6.	"A Good Living"	3:33
7.	"Softness, Goodness"	4:05
8.	"Something Evil"	3:42
9.	"The Longest Line"	2:46
Total length:		32:06

== Personnel ==
Credits are adapted from the album's liner notes.

Starflyer 59

- Jason Martin – guitar, vocals
- Frank Lenz – drums, string arrangements

Additional musicians

- Nicole Garcia – violin
- Briana Dandy – viola
- Ginger Murphy – cello
- Dirk Lemmenes – double bass
- Matt Fronke – trumpet

Production

- Starflyer 59 – recording, production
- Ken Andrews – mixing
- Troy Glessner (Spectre Studios, Seattle, WA) – mastering

Artwork

- Asterik Studio (Seattle, WA) – art direction and design

Management

- Brandon Ebel – executive producer
