= Jeff Cloud =

Jeff Cloud may refer to:

- Jeff Cloud (musician)
- Jeff Cloud (politician)
