= Lovers and Leaders =

Studio album by Sacha Sacket
- Released: 2007
- Genre: Alternative Pop, Singer/Songwriter
- Label: Golden Sphinx
- Producer: Sacha Sacket

Sacha Sacket chronology
| Shadowed | Lovers and Leaders |

Lovers and Leaders is the third album from Sacha Sacket.

== Track listing ==
1. Hail 4:22
2. Judy (For Shame) 4:19
3. Stay 3:31
4. Halo 4:08
5. Brandon Boyd 3:55
6. Maybe You Can Save Me (From You) 3:49
7. How Low? 4:14
8. Jove 4:08
9. What You Are 3:08
10. Hallowed (Show Me How) 4:46
11. Time To Go 3:44

== Reviews ==
- ALLALOM Music Review
- Edge New York Review
