= Frank Lenz =

American drummer

Frank Lenz (born 18 June 1967 in San Leandro, California) is a drummer from Southern California who has done work for many bands and artists, including Richard Swift, The Weepies, Everest, Pedro The Lion, Starflyer 59, Lassie Foundation, Duraluxe, Map, Charity Empressa, and his own solo work.

== Biography ==
In December 2003, American webzine Somewhere Cold voted Frank Lenz Artist of the Year on their 2003 Somewhere Cold Awards Hall of Fame list. A year later, in December 2004, Somewhere Cold ranked his album Conquest Slaughter No. 2 on their 2004 Somewhere Cold Awards Hall of Fame list.

== Discography ==
=== Full Length Albums ===
- The Hot Stuff (2001, Northern Records)
- The Last Temptation of Frank Lenz (2003, Independent)
- Conquest Slaughter (2004, Velvet Blue Music)
- VileLenz & Thieves (2006, Hidden Agenda/Parasol Records)
- Strictly Background : Original Motion Picture Soundtrack (2009, Velvet Blue Music)
- Holy Rollers : Original Motion Picture Soundtrack (2012, Velvet Blue Music)
- Water Tiger (2013, Velvet Blue Music)

=== EPs ===
- Vacation (2012, Velvet Blue Music)
- Pyramid (2018, Independent)
- Hot Painless City (2020, Velvet Blue Music)

=== Singles ===
- Brothers Who Are Breathing (2005, ABC DOCUMENTATION)
- Summer's Coming Soon (2014, Velvet Blue Music)

== Bands ==
- Fold Zandura
- Lassie Foundation, The
- Starflyer 59
- Pony Express
- Headphones (band)
- Shepherd (with Ronnie Martin of Joy Electric)
- Mortal
- Cush
- Charity Empressa

== Album contributions ==
- Calico Sunset - Deep, Deep Paranoia
- Calicoes, The - Custom Acceleration
- Jared Colinger - Favourite Hallucination EP, Daughters & Daggers (string arrangements)
- Cooper, Amy - Mirrors
- Charity Empressa - Charity Empressa, The Skin of Whippets
- CUSH - Cush/New Sound, Cush EP
- Daniel Amos - Mr. Buechner's Dream (additional keyboards & percussion)
- Duraluxe - The Suitcase
- Everett, Wayne - KingsQueens
- Fold Zandura - Re:turn, Ultraforever
- Headphones - Headphones (drums)
- Kat Jones - Building EP, La Rosa, La Calavera
- Lassie Foundation, The - Pacifico, El Dorado (engineer), I Duel Sioux And The Ale Of Saturn
- Lewis, Crystal - Holy, Holy, Holy, More
- MAP - Secrets By the Highway, Think Like an Owner
- Max, Kevin - The Imposter
- Nelson, Holly - Leaving the Yard
- O.C. Supertones - Chase the Sun(drums),Loud and Clear (drums)
- Plankeye - Relocation
- Pony Express - Becoming What You Hate, Fraud EP, "Odd Balls"
- Roper - Brace Yourself for the Mediocre (drums)
- Shepherd - Committing To Tape (drums)
- Starflyer 59 - Leave Here a Stranger (additionals), Old (drums, bg vocals), I Am the Portuguese Blues (drums), The Last Laurel (drum kit), Talking Voice vs. Singing Voice (drum kit, string arrangements)
- Swift, Richard - Walking Without Effort, The Novelist
- The Weepies - Hideaway, Be My Thrill
- The Dingees - Sundown to Midnight and The Crucial Conspiracy
