= Old (Starflyer 59 album) =

Studio album by Starflyer 59
- Released: May 20, 2003
- Recorded: December 9, 2002 – January 28, 2003
- Genres: Alternative rock; glam rock
- Length: 39:02
- Label: Tooth & Nail
- Producers: Starflyer 59; Aaron Sprinkle

Starflyer 59 chronology
| Can't Stop Eating (2002) | Old (2003) | I Am the Portuguese Blues (2004) |

Starflyer 59 studio albums chronology
| Leave Here a Stranger (2001) | Old (2003) | I Am the Portuguese Blues (2004) |

Professional ratings
Review scores
| Source | Rating |
|---|---|
| AllMusic | 4/5 stars |
| Cokemachineglow.com | 59% |
| Cross Rhythms | 9/10 squares |
| Jesusfreakhideout.com | 4.5/5 stars |
| Pitchfork Media | 7.9 |

Old is the seventh studio album by alternative rock band Starflyer 59. It was released on May 20, 2003 by Tooth & Nail Records. Developed as a concept album (like previous studio album Leave Here a Stranger), Old examines themes such as aging and mortality, difficulty in the music industry, and cultural issues regarding marital infidelity and increasing rates of divorce.

Old Demos, the fifth extended play by Starflyer 59, was released in 2003 by Velvet Blue Music. It was available via mail order for purchasers of Old, where it features early versions of three tracks.

== Track listing ==
All songs written by Jason Martin.

Old track listing
| No. | Title | Length |
|---|---|---|
| 1. | "Underneath" | 4:35 |
| 2. | "Major Awards" | 2:53 |
| 3. | "Loved Ones" | 3:03 |
| 4. | "Passengers" | 3:05 |
| 5. | "The Lights On" | 3:07 |
| 6. | "New Wife, New Life" | 3:35 |
| 7. | "Old" | 5:22 |
| 8. | "A Kissing Song" | 2:54 |
| 9. | "Unbelievers" | 5:31 |
| 10. | "First Heart Attack" | 4:57 |
| Total length: | | 39:02 |

Old Demos track listing
| No. | Title | Length |
|---|---|---|
| 1. | "The Sheriff (Note: This track was renamed to "Major Awards" on the studio album.)" | 2:56 |
| 2. | "Old" | 4:39 |
| 3. | "Underneath" | 4:00 |
| Total length: | | 11:35 |

== Personnel ==
Credits are adapted from the album's liner notes.

Starflyer 59

- Jason Martin – guitar, vocals
- Jeff Cloud – bass guitar
- Richard Swift – keyboards, backing vocals
- Frank Lenz – drums, backing vocals

Production

- Aaron Sprinkle – production, recording, mixing

Artwork

- Michael Christian McCaddon – art direction and design

Management

- Brandon Ebel – executive producer
