= Sacha Sacket =

American pop singer-songwriter (born 1978)

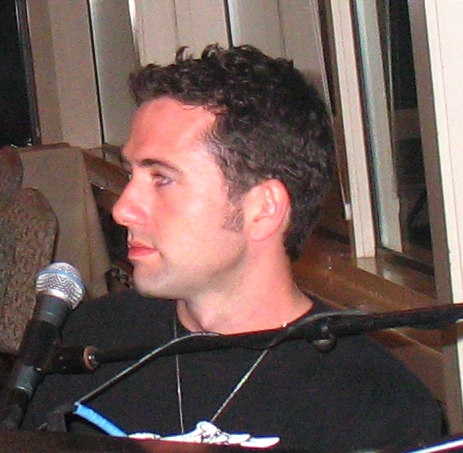
- Sacha Sacket performing in 2005

Background information
- Born: Sacha Sacket; September 20, 1978 (age 47); Tehran, Iran
- Genres: Pop, pop rock, rock
- Occupations: Singer, songwriter, actor, pianist
- Website: www.sachasacket.com

Sacha Sacket (born September 20, 1978, in Tehran, Iran) is an American pop singer-songwriter who resides in Los Angeles, California. Sacket has produced six albums, Alabaster Flesh (2001), Shadowed (2005), Lovers and Leaders (2007), Live at the Zone (2008), Hermitage (2009), and Viscera (2010). He has also starred in the musical "It Gets Better," (2012) which also features songs he has written.

== Albums ==
=== Alabaster Flesh ===
His first album was an exploration of masculinity in culture that "summons to its use such inveterate forms as ancient mythology and astronomy to lend support to his reinvention of modern heroism". In an August 1, 2001 interview with Greling Jackson of Oasis Magazine, he comments, "[It] was an album where I was claiming my voice... I really didn't know how to before... I learned to crawl out of my shell and expose my entity." This first album was largely promoted across California, where he put on live concerts at high schools and university campuses to gain exposure.

=== Shadowed ===
Recorded in 2004 in Los Angeles with producer Mike Baiardi, Sacha was quoted as saying: "I felt it was time to delve into 'dark things' go places where I degraded myself, where I was a doormat, where I would destroy someone if I could. Not in an attempt to immediately rectify or justify myself, just to express it. I had to be damaged, to have faults, to show the darkness. I really went to those life and death situations where a life is beginning or ending. Where your humanity truly reveals itself, when your character is tested the underlying truth."

Shadowed marked a Sacha touring countless universities and colleges nationwide as well as many festivals.

=== Lovers and Leaders ===
Sacket's third album, Lovers and Leaders, debuted in 2007 to generally positive reviews and with the release Sacket toured regionally. He is quoted as saying, "Although it's a love album, the theme is really more about my battle not to succumb to it. I guess I equated love with losing power, losing my goals and aspirations. I was trying to find the balance between honoring someone else and myself, while finding where the edges meet."

Sacket also toured with a band: Alexa Brinkschulte on drums, Jennifer Trani on guitar, and Anna Rosales on bass guitar. They toured in clubs and venues along the west coast.

=== Live at the Zone ===
Sacha Sacket brought his all-female band to a Los Angeles sex club to record a new live record in 2008, Sacha Sacket and the LadyKillers: Live at the Zone. The full-length album marks the culmination of a year touring together and showcases a gritty reinvention of his previously introspective work.

=== Viscera ===
Sacha released 1+ new song every week starting June 1, 2010 and culminated in 35 new tracks. The first single "Breed" was released June 1 as promised. Recorded in Sacha's own studio "The Cave." The album features many musician 'greats' including indie legend Joey Waronker (Beck, R.E.M., Thom Yorke), Gus Seyffert (Norah Jones, Sia), Michael Chavez (Sarah McLachlan, John Mayer), and Aaron Sterling (Taylor Swift, Regina Spektor) to name a few.

== Discography ==
=== Albums ===
- Alabaster Flesh (2001)
- Shadowed (2004)
- Lovers and Leaders (2007)
- Sacha Sacket and the LadyKillers: Live at the Zone (2008)
- Hermitage (2009)
- Viscera (2010)

== Personal life ==
Sacket performed in the nationwide tour of the musical It Gets Better, based on the It Gets Better Project started by Dan Savage. He was inspired to participate in this musical after he came across a video on YouTube posted by Jamey Rodemeyer, who shortly afterwards committed suicide. He later penned several songs for the show.
