= Gold (Starflyer 59 album) =

Starflyer 59 (Gold)
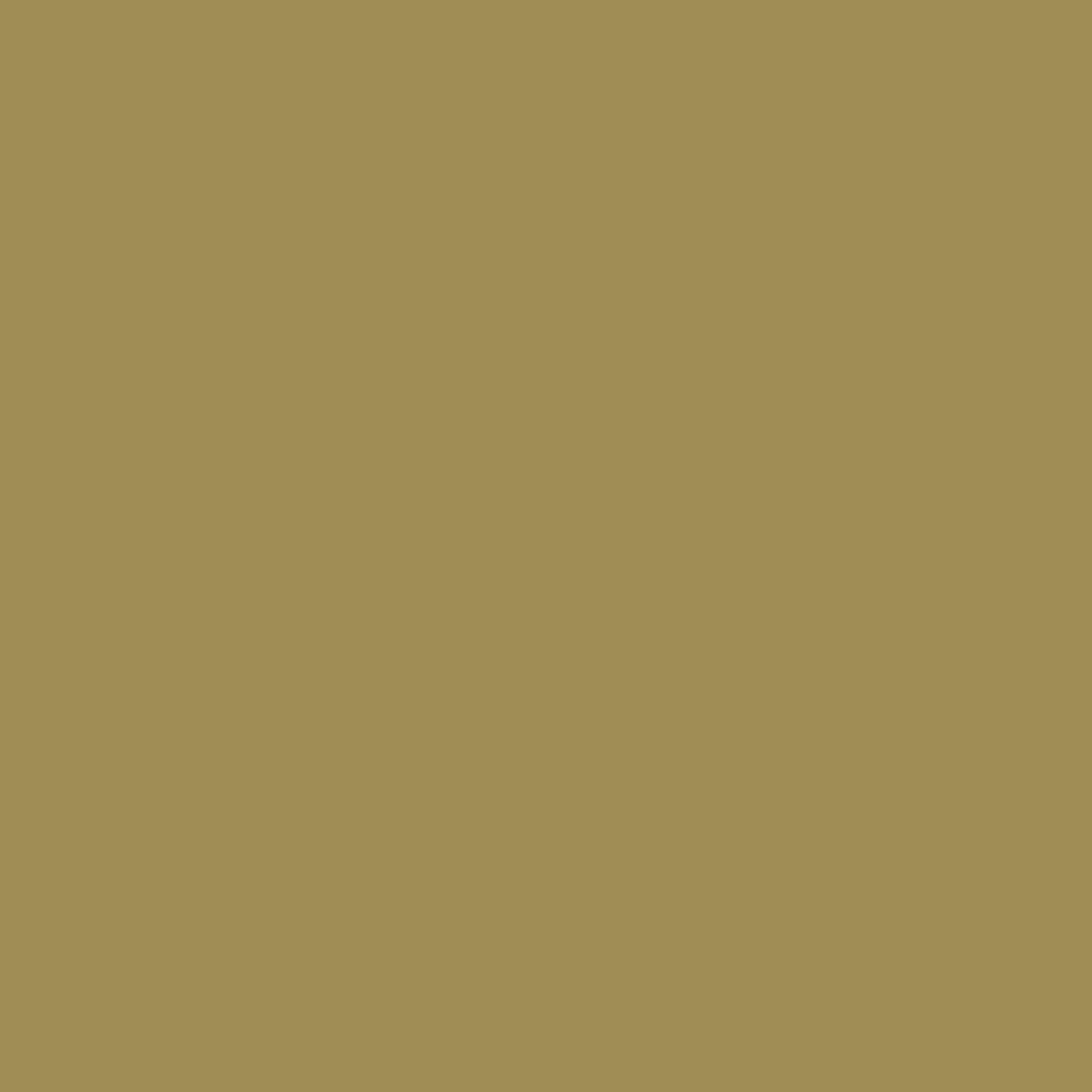

Studio album by Starflyer 59
- Released: June 27, 1995 (Note: The extended edition of Gold was released on June 28, 2005.)
- Studio: The Green Room
- Genre: Shoegaze; noise pop; indie rock; post-grunge
- Length: 50:07
- Label: Tooth & Nail
- Producer: Jason Martin

Starflyer 59 chronology
She's the Queen (1994)	Starflyer 59 (Gold) (1995)	Le Vainqueur (1995)

Starflyer 59 studio albums chronology
Starflyer 59 (Silver) (1994)	Starflyer 59 (Gold) (1995)	Americana (1997)

Extended Edition (2005 remaster)

Professional ratings
Review scores
Source	Rating
AllMusic	3/5 stars
Cross Rhythms (Extended Edition)	6/10 squares
Daily Vault	C−
Jesusfreakhideout.com	3.5/5 stars

Starflyer 59 (Gold) (Note: The original release of Gold was eponymously titled Starflyer 59 (as was debut studio album Silver), where it was colloquially known as Gold. The album was officially titled Gold for its 2005 extended, remastered edition. The cover art of a 2009 digital reissue of the original release of Silver features a plain, monochromatic yellow background, not to be confused with Gold.) is the second studio album by alternative rock band Starflyer 59. Continuing the heavy shoegaze sound of debut studio album Silver while making various adjustments, Gold explores themes of heartbreak, melancholy, and lost friendships. It was released on June 27, 1995 by Tooth & Nail Records.

Ranked as number 41 on Pitchfork's 50 Best Shoegaze Albums of All Time list, Gold is considered a landmark in the history of the shoegaze genre. Discussing the album with an interviewer at NPR decades later, band frontman Jason Martin (who produced the album) mentioned, "I don't know what the hell I was doing on that thing. But listening back, it's almost like you're listening back to a different person." With regard to the album's sound, Martin also told NPR on an earlier occasion that he "just wanted heavy music with prettier chords."

In June 2005, Tooth & Nail released an extended, remastered edition of Gold for its 10th anniversary. It features five bonus tracks between its two companions: the Goodbyes Are Sad 7-inch single, and the Le Vainqueur EP, both released in 1995. This was accompanied by an extended, remastered edition of debut studio album Silver.

== Recording ==
In the CD liner notes for the Easy Come, Easy Go compilation album released in 2000, band biographer J. Edward Keyes records that Gold was marked by a chaotic production process. Having parted ways with original production team Blood (Jyro Xhan and Jerome Fontamillas, along with Mark Rodriguez) due to "internal tension," band frontman Jason Martin ended up taking most production duties upon himself, working alongside engineer Bob Moon, to complete his original two-album contract with Tooth & Nail. Moon recalls that Martin, grinding through a month-long recording process, told him outside the studio on one occasion that "it was the first time he'd seen daylight in seven days." Coupling the difficult recording process with the album's depressive themes, Martin revealed to Keyes that the Gold sessions were causing him to have "a semi-breakdown. It was a sick experience."

Martin recalls that after production had finished, upon final examination, he "hated [the album]. There was just too much me. ... It was just so overindulgent. The music became longer and longer with those stupid solos because I was in there and I just wasn't thinking straight." Martin also initially received negative feedback from fans on the album's modified shoegaze sound and production quality, having confused "intentional underproduction for budgetary constraints," with Martin stating to Keyes that "they hated the thing." In an effort to create a unique sound inspired by 1970s rock, Moon describes that he and Martin "had like fifteen mikes up for guitar, [and] different types of mikes in different positions. We had six rhythm tracks [running, which were] going through three different [amps, in order to get] a low guitar tone, a mid guitar tone, and a high guitar tone, and then doubling all of those to get this wall of sound.

Friends of Martin privately shared to him that wider connections were discussing how "Starflyer really choked on this second album." However, sometime after the album's release, Gold unexpectedly received a dramatic increase in popularity, along with a significant rise of approval among fans, going on to reach "nearly triple the sales" of Silver.

For an interview in 2010, Martin mentioned that before he tracked guitar, he "tracked drums first with no click track. I used to practice that way for [Gold], so most of the [tempo] slowdowns were intentional."

== Artwork ==
Matching the style of debut studio album Silver, the cover art of Gold features a plain, monochromatic, metallic gold background. The CD liner notes feature artwork led by Jason Pickersgill, depicting vinyl labels for each song. Following the album's heavy themes and the Christian worldview of Martin and record label Tooth & Nail, the beginning of the liner notes features a quotation of Psalm 34:18:

The Lord is near to the brokenhearted, and saves those who are crushed in spirit. (NASB1995)

Designed by Asterik Studio in Seattle, Washington, the 2005 Extended Edition cover art features a plain gold background, along with a centered, ornate white emblem adorned by foliage, drawn in woodcut style. The emblem depicts a framed painting of a steamship, alluding to the ship illustrated on the cover art of the Le Vainqueur EP, having been included as bonus tracks. (Note: The Goodbyes Are Sad 7-inch single is also included as bonus tracks, preceding the Le Vainqueur EP tracks.) In combination with the frame, the foliage has been arranged to form the shape of a heart, following the album's themes of heartbreak. The bottom center of the painting frame holds a plaque of the album title (officially using Gold), and the top center holds a circular seal bearing the syllable initials and numbers of the band name.

== Track listing ==
All songs written by Jason Martin.

Starflyer 59 (Gold) track listing
No.	Title	Length
1.	"A Housewife Love Song"	4:12
2.	"Duel Overhead Cam"	4:38
3.	"When You Feel Miserable"	5:07
4.	"You're Mean"	2:04
5.	"Stop Wasting Your Whole Life / Messed Up and Down"	5:03
6.	"Messed Up Over You"	6:44
7.	"When You Feel the Mess"	6:16
8.	"Somewhere When Your Heart Glowed the Hope"	4:43
9.	"Indiana"	4:26
10.	"Do You Ever Feel That Way"	2:15
11.	"One Shot Juanita"	4:39
Total length:		50:07 (Note: The total length of the album release tracks on the Extended Edition reaches 50:06 due to track length variances caused by the remastering process.)

Extended Edition bonus tracks (Goodbyes Are Sad 7-inch single)
No.	Title	Length
12.	"Next Time Around"	5:17
13.	"Goodbyes Are Sad"	3:52

Extended Edition bonus tracks (Le Vainqueur EP)
No.	Title	Length
14.	"When No One Calls (It Will Be Alright)"	3:19
15.	"The Starflyer 2000 Reprise"	4:09
16.	"Le Vainqueur"	6:11
Total length:		72:55 (Note: The total length of all tracks on the Extended Edition reaches 72:54 due to track length variances caused by the remastering process.)

== Personnel ==
Credits are adapted from the album's liner notes.

Starflyer 59

- Jason Martin – guitar, drums, vocals
- Andrew Larson – bass guitar

Additional musicians

All additionals are credited as the "Star Corps."

- Wayne Everett (courtesy of Rode Dog Records) – backing vocals and drums on "When You Feel Miserable"
- Ed Giles Benrock – drums on "Stop Wasting Your Whole Life / Messed Up and Down", "Messed Up Over You", and "When You Feel the Mess"
- Gene Eugene – Hammond organ on "Messed Up Over You"

Production

- Jason Martin – production, mixing (tracks 1–11)
- Bob Moon – engineering, mixing (tracks 1–3, 5–6, 8–10)
- Gene Eugene – mixing (tracks 4, 7, and 11)
- Brian Gardener – mastering
- Wayne Everett – vocal production on "When You Feel Miserable"

Artwork

- Jason Pickersgill (DCX-71) – visualizing and imaging
- Karen Mason – band photo

Management

- Brandon Ebel – executive producer
- Jeff Cloud – tour management

=== Extended Edition (2005 remaster) ===
Credits are adapted from the Extended Edition album's liner notes.

Production

- Troy Glessner (Spectre Studios, Seattle, WA) – digital remastering (Gold tracks 1–11)

Artwork

- Asterik Studio (Seattle, WA) – art direction and design
