= Silver (Starflyer 59 album) =

Starflyer 59 (Silver)

Studio album by Starflyer 59
- Released: March 3, 1994 (Note: The extended edition of Silver was released on June 28, 2005.)
- Studio: The Green Room
- Genre: Shoegaze; noise pop; dream pop; alternative rock; indie rock; Christian rock
- Length: 34:03
- Label: Tooth & Nail
- Producer: Blood (Note: Blood was a collective pseudonym for Jyro Xhan and Jerome Fontamillas, along with Mark Rodriguez.)

Starflyer 59 chronology
Starflyer 59 (Silver) (1994)	She's the Queen (1994)

Starflyer 59 studio albums chronology
Starflyer 59 (Silver) (1994)	Starflyer 59 (Gold) (1995)

Extended Edition (2005 remaster)

Starflyer 59 (Silver) (Note: The original release of Silver was eponymously titled Starflyer 59 (as was second studio album Gold), where it was colloquially known as Silver. The album was officially titled Silver for its 2005 extended, remastered edition. The cover art of a 2009 digital reissue of the original release features a plain, monochromatic yellow background, not to be confused with Gold.) is the debut studio album by alternative rock band Starflyer 59. It was released on March 3, 1994, by Tooth & Nail Records. Inspired by acts like The Cure, The Smiths, and Black Sabbath, Silver features a heavy alternative rock sound strongly influenced by British shoegaze bands of the early 1990s. The album explores themes surrounding melancholy, heartbreak, and Christian faith.

In June 2005, Tooth & Nail released an extended, remastered edition of Silver. It features eight bonus tracks from its companion She's the Queen EP, released in 1994. This was accompanied by an extended, remastered edition of second studio album Gold, marking its 10th anniversary.

== Background and recording ==
In the CD liner notes for the Easy Come, Easy Go compilation album released in 2000, band biographer J. Edward Keyes records that future Starflyer 59 frontman Jason Martin, having performed in various fledgling bands started by his enterprising brother Ronnie Martin (Joy Electric), frequented live shows of local California Christian rock act Lifesavers Underground (LSU) alongside Ronnie. Having learned that LSU frontman Michael Knott was starting a new record label, Ronnie Martin forwarded a demo that he and Jason had been developing. Impressed by their work, Knott signed the Martins to his new label Blonde Vinyl, with the Martins taking the name Dance House Children.

By the time of the collapse of Blonde Vinyl in late 1992, Jason Martin, wanting to make heavier, guitar-oriented music, had been "privately working on a handful of songs [at home] that would eventually evolve into Starflyer's landmark Silver." Originally under the band name "Starflyer 2000" (changed shortly after to Starflyer 59), Martin recruited friend Andrew Larson for bass guitar, intending to release this material on Knott's following (and subsequently ill-fated) label Siren Records. However, in early 1993, the Martins ended up meeting Tooth & Nail Records founder Brandon Ebel at a local music festival. Ebel relayed to Keyes that after the Martins gave him a copy of Jason's demos, having begun listening, "I was just freaking. It started with Blue Collar Love, and I was just like, 'This is just over the top. There is nothing like this in the market.'" Three months later, having prepared finances to sign his first artists, Ebel offered Martin a two-album contract as his third artist, stunning and exciting Martin.

Having been paired with Mortal members Jerome Fontamillas and Jyro Xhan as producers (under the collective pseudonym Blood), the "frenzied" two-week-long Silver sessions were recorded at Gene Eugene's The Green Room studio. With Silver having been released in March 1994, Martin received "sudden, massive, and smothering" positive reception from new fans at the 1994 Cornerstone Festival. Having started touring with Mortal and The Prayer Chain, Martin found himself "playing in front of like 1,000 kids a night." Various "leftovers and alternate takes from the Silver sessions" were later released in November 1994 as the She's the Queen EP. Having returned from touring "elated," Martin prepared to start work on second studio album Gold.

== Artwork ==
The cover art of Silver features a plain, monochromatic, metallic silver background. Band frontman Jason Martin, having remembered his friend Jeff Cloud wanting to "release an all-beige album," put forward the idea of solid silver for the cover art.

The album liner art contains a reference to Psalm 5:1–3 for "2nd. Space Song" (which features explicitly Christian lyrics):

Give ear to my words, O Lord, consider my sighing. Listen to my cry for help, my King and my God, for to you I pray. In the morning, O Lord, you hear my voice; in the morning I lay my requests before you and wait in expectation. (NIV84)

Designed by Asterik Studio in Seattle, Washington, the 2005 Extended Edition cover art features a plain silver background, along with a centered, ornate white emblem adorned by foliage and ribbons, drawn in woodcut style. The emblem depicts a royal crown, alluding to the She's the Queen EP, having been included as bonus tracks. The crown pinnacle holds a radiating cross, referencing the Christian worldview of Martin and record label Tooth & Nail. Beneath the crown, the bottom of the emblem features a frame holding a plaque of the album title (officially using Silver), and above the plaque is found a circular seal bearing the syllable initials and numbers of the band name.

== Track listing ==
All songs written by Jason Martin.

Starflyer 59 (Silver) track listing
No.	Title	Length
1.	"Blue Collar Love"	4:04
2.	"Monterey"	2:59
3.	"Sled"	3:27
4.	"Hazel Would"	2:53
5.	"The Zenith"	5:36
6.	"2nd. Space Song"	3:20
7.	"Droned"	4:32
8.	"Happy Days Are Here Again"	1:16
9.	"She Only Knows"	2:07
10.	"The Dungeon"	3:49
Total length:		34:03 (Note: The total length of the album release tracks on the Extended Edition reaches 34:02 due to track length variances caused by the remastering process.)

Extended Edition bonus tracks (She's the Queen EP)
No.	Title	Length
11.	"She's the Queen"	3:23
12.	"She Was My Sweet Heart"	3:48
13.	"Blue Collar Love" (Joy Electric Dub Mix)	3:56
14.	"Monterey" (Lounge Version)	4:47
15.	"Canary Row"	2:52
16.	"Salinas"	2:51
17.	"The Drop"	2:26
18.	"Droned" (In Love Version)	4:12
Total length:		62:18 (Note: The total length of all tracks on the Extended Edition reaches 62:17 due to track length variances caused by the remastering process.)

== Personnel ==
Credits are adapted from the album's liner notes.

Starflyer 59

- Jason Martin – guitar, vocals, drums (Note: Dan Reid is credited for drums. However, Martin himself played drums, where Reid was intended to join the band and tour, which never materialized.)
- Andrew Larson – bass guitar

Production

- Blood (Jyro Xhan and Jerome Fontamillas, along with Mark Rodriguez) – production, mixing
- Bob Moon – engineering, mixing
- Brian Gardner (Bernie Grundman Mastering, Los Angeles, CA) – mastering

Artwork

- Brandon Ebel – art direction and design, band and studio photography
- Jason Pickersgill – art direction and design, imaging and logo design (at DCCA)
- Matt Wignall – Triumph motorcycle photography

Management

- Brandon Ebel – executive producer

=== Extended Edition (2005 remaster) ===
Credits are adapted from the Extended Edition album's liner notes.

Production

- Troy Glessner (Spectre Studios, Seattle, WA) – digital remastering (Silver tracks 1–10)

Artwork

- Asterik Studio (Seattle, WA) – art direction and design

== Reception ==
Professional ratings
Review scores
Source	Rating
AllMusic	3/5 stars
Cross Rhythms (Extended Edition)	6/10 squares
Jesusfreakhideout.com	5/5 stars

Observing the album's use of heavily distorted and effects-drenched guitars, CCM Magazine commented that Silver was "quite unlike anything else in Christian music" at the time.
