= Leave Here a Stranger =

Studio album by Starflyer 59
- Released: June 5, 2001
- Genre: Indie rock; dream pop; pop rock; Christian rock
- Length: 40:05
- Label: Tooth & Nail
- Producer: Terry Scott Taylor

Starflyer 59 chronology
Easy Come, Easy Go (2000)	Leave Here a Stranger (2001)	Can't Stop Eating (2002)

Starflyer 59 studio albums chronology
Everybody Makes Mistakes (1999)	Leave Here a Stranger (2001)	Old (2003)

Professional ratings
Review scores
Source	Rating
AllMusic	4.5/5 stars
Cross Rhythms	6/10 squares
Jesusfreakhideout.com	5/5 stars

Leave Here a Stranger is the sixth studio album by alternative rock band Starflyer 59. It was released on June 5, 2001 by Tooth & Nail Records. Unlike most contemporary albums, it was recorded and mixed in mono as opposed to stereo. Leave Here a Stranger was listed in Los Angeles Times among the Top 10 albums of 2001. HM Magazine characterizes its lyrical content as a concept album about the troubles associated with the life of a recording artist.

In a 2008 interview, Martin stated that the photo featured on the cover art is "supposedly a set shot from [Star Wars: Episode I – The Phantom Menace] that a photographer had, [which] we thought had a neat look to it."

== Track listing ==
All songs written by Jason Martin.

Leave Here a Stranger track listing
No.	Title	Length
1.	"All My Friends Who Play Guitar"	5:21
2.	"Can You Play Drums?"	2:56
3.	"When I Learn to Sing"	3:25
4.	"Give Up the War"	4:49
5.	"Things Like This Help Me"	4:58
6.	"This I Don't Need"	2:53
7.	"I Like Your Photographs"	6:21
8.	"...Moves On"	1:20
9.	"Night Music"	3:41
10.	"Your Company"	4:21
Total length:		40:05

== Personnel ==
Credits are adapted from the album's liner notes.

Starflyer 59

- Jason Martin – guitar, vocals
- Jeff Cloud – bass guiltar
- Joey Esquibel – drums
- Josh Dooley – keyboards

Additional musicians

- Rob Watson – additionals
- Frank Lenz – additionals

Production

- Terry Scott Taylor – production
- Andrew D. Prickett – recording
- Chris Colbert – mixing
- Brian Gardner – mastering (Bernie Grundman Mastering, Los Angeles, CA)

Artwork

- Matt Mueller – color photography
- Matt Wignal – band photos
- Andy Mueller – art direction and design (OhioGirl Design, Chicago, IL)

Management

- Brandon Ebel – A&R
