= Americana (Starflyer 59 album) =

Studio album by Starflyer 59
- Released: March 11, 1997
- Genres: Shoegaze; indie rock; hard rock; Christian rock
- Length: 41:14
- Label: Tooth & Nail
- Producers: Gene Eugene; Starflyer 59

Starflyer 59 chronology
Le Vainqueur (1995)	Americana (1997)	The Fashion Focus (1998)

Starflyer 59 studio albums chronology
Starflyer 59 (Gold) (1995)	Americana (1997)	The Fashion Focus (1998)

Professional ratings
Review scores
Source	Rating
AllMusic	4/5 stars
Cross Rhythms	9/10 squares
Jesusfreakhideout.com	4/5 stars

Americana is the third studio album by alternative rock band Starflyer 59. It was released on March 11, 1997 by Tooth & Nail Records. Americana continues the shoegaze sound of the first two studio albums (Silver and Gold), while opting to include more aspects of indie rock and hard rock. Having produced Gold by himself, band frontman Jason Martin enlisted the help of Gene Eugene to produce Americana. The album features more explicitly Christian lyrics.

== Track listing ==
All songs written by Jason Martin.

Americana track listing
No.	Title	Length
1.	"The Voyager"	4:38
2.	"The Hearttaker"	4:06
3.	"Harmony"	4:22
4.	"All You Want Are the Things I Need"	4:00
5.	"You Think You're Radical"	4:08
6.	"The Translator"	2:56
7.	"You Don't Miss Me"	4:45
8.	"The Boulevard"	2:29
9.	"Help Me When You're Gone"	5:04
10.	"Everyone but Me"	4:46
Total length:		41:14

== Personnel ==
Credits are adapted from the album's liner notes.

Starflyer 59

- Jason Martin – guitar, moog synthesizer, vocals
- Wayne Everett – drums, tambourine, backing vocals
- Eric Campuzano – bass guitar
- Gene Eugene – Hammond organ, Rhodes piano, vibraphone

Production

- Gene Eugene – production

Artwork

- Jason71 (Jason Pickersgill) – art direction and photography

Management

- Brandon Ebel – executive producer
