= Dance House Children =

- Also known as: Love Children, The Brothers Martin
- Genres: Techno, Synthpop, Tech House
- Years active: 1991 - 1992
- Labels: Blonde Vinyl

Dance House Children was the early 1990s music group of Ronnie Martin and Jason Martin that was the precursor to The Brothers Martin. In the liner notes of Jesus, Ronnie described its music as trendy, club-oriented music. The group was signed to the Blonde Vinyl label and released two albums, Songs & Stories (1991) and Jesus (1992). Jesus was rereleased by Millennium Eight Records for a limited time.

The band was originally named "Love Children," but the label's founder, Michael Knott didn't like the name and suggested "Dance House Jesus" instead. The brothers ended up combining both names, while the leftover Jesus became the name of their second effort. Like in those by The Brothers Martin, Dance House Children songs were composed by both Ronnie and Jason, while vocals were performed individually, as opposed to in duets.

Ronnie later released Rainbow Rider: Beautiful Dazzling Music No. 1, which was created with friends Tom Danielson and Jeff Cloud. One source claims that his sister Amy played a Moog Prodigy for the album and another claims that she "assisted" in its production.

== See also ==
- The Brothers Martin

== Discography ==
- Jesus
- Songs & Stories
- Rainbow Rider
