= The Fashion Focus =

Studio album by Starflyer 59
- Released: October 6, 1998
- Genre: Indie rock; pop rock; shoegaze; synth-pop
- Length: 43:26
- Label: Tooth & Nail
- Producer: Gene Eugene

Starflyer 59 chronology
Americana (1997)	The Fashion Focus (1998)	Fell in Love at 22 (1999)

Starflyer 59 studio albums chronology
Americana (1997)	The Fashion Focus (1998)	Everybody Makes Mistakes (1999)

Professional ratings
Review scores
Source	Rating
AllMusic	4/5 stars
Cross Rhythms	5/10 squares
Jesusfreakhideout.com	4/5 stars

The Fashion Focus is the fourth studio album by alternative rock band Starflyer 59. It was released on October 6, 1998 by Tooth & Nail Records. Progressing from the shoegaze sound of the first three studio albums, The Fashion Focus features more songwriting surrounding pop rock, accompanied by strong indie rock influence. The working title of the album was The Sad Lives of the Hollywood Lovers.

== Track listing ==
All songs written by Jason Martin.

The Fashion Focus track listing
No.	Title	Length
1.	"I Drive a Lot"	3:15
2.	"We're the Ordinary"	4:16
3.	"Sundown"	3:53
4.	"Fell in Love at 22"	2:32
5.	"A Holiday Song (Happy Holidays)"	2:08
6.	"All the Time"	3:16
7.	"The Birthrite"	3:19
8.	"Card Games and Old Friends"	2:08
9.	"Shut Your Mouth"	3:11
10.	"The Fashion Focus"	3:16
11.	"Too Much Fun"	7:42
12.	"Days of Lamech"	4:30
Total length:		43:26

== Personnel ==
Credits are adapted from the album's liner notes, along with the label on its accompanying CD.

Starflyer 59

- Jason Martin – guitar, keyboards, vocals, bass guitar, tambourine
- Jeff Cloud – bass guitar
- Wayne Everett – drums, tambourine, backing vocals, sleigh bells
- Gene Eugene – ARP String Ensemble, Fender Rhodes, piano, keyboards, bass guitar (and bass vamp), Farfisa organ
- Michael Knott – backing vocals on "Shut Your Mouth"

Production

- Gene Eugene – production

Artwork

- The Collection Agency – design and photography
- Anthony Saint James – band photography
