= Starflyer 59 =

American alternative rock band

- Origin: Riverside, California, U.S.
- Genres: Alternative rock; Christian rock; shoegaze; indie rock; dream pop; indie pop; post-punk revival
- Years active: 1993–present
- Labels: Tooth & Nail, Somewherecold, Velvet Blue Music
- Members: Jason Martin; Steven Dail; Charlie Martin
- Past members: Andrew Larson; Eric Campuzano; Jeff Cloud; Wayne Everett; Joey Esquibel; Richard Swift; Josh Dooley; Gene Eugene; Matt Johnson; Trevor Monks; Trey Many; TW Walsh; Rob Withem; Frank Lenz
- Website: www.sf59.com

Starflyer 59 is an American alternative rock band from Riverside, California, that was founded in 1993 by Jason Martin, brother of Ronnie Martin of Joy Electric. While Jason Martin has written nearly all of Starflyer 59's songs, the band has included a number of different musicians over the years, including Jeff Cloud, Frank Lenz, and Richard Swift. The band's sound was initially identified as an outgrowth of the shoegaze movement of the early 1990s, but it is considered to have gradually evolved to the point of little resemblance to that of its early days.

== History ==
=== 1993–1997: Formation and "shoegaze" era ===
Starflyer 59 was signed to Tooth & Nail Records, their original and current label, after Jason Martin gave a demo to Brandon Ebel when the two met at a music festival in 1993. Shortly afterwards, Ebel contacted Martin and offered him a record contract. The band was one of Tooth & Nail's original signees.

In 1994, Starflyer 59 recorded and released its eponymous debut album, colloquially called Silver for its monochromatic cover art. Silver and second studio album Gold would later become the official titles of their respective 2005 extended, remastered editions. One digital reissue of Silver has yellow-colored cover art, not to be mistaken with Gold. In mid-1994, Starflyer 59 released a follow-up EP to Silver entitled She's the Queen. Both Silver and She's the Queen exhibit heavy shoegaze influences with significant usage of reverb, phaser, and delay. Linda Schellack, the mother of Tooth & Nail founder Brandon Ebel, is featured on the She's the Queen album art as a homecoming queen.

In 1995, Starflyer 59 released their eponymous second album, colloquially referred to as Gold, continuing the monochromatic cover art theme of Silver. The sound was similar to their first release, while Jason Martin continued to add layers of guitar riffs to each song. This album is considered instrumental in developing the "shoegaze" sound. In 2016, Pitchfork Media ranked Gold as the number 41 best shoegaze album of all time. Lyrically, the album continued the trend of somewhat depressive and lovelorn content in contrast to the message of the band's Christian record label. In 1996, the band released a live album via Velvet Blue Music entitled Plugged.

For Starflyer 59's next studio album, Americana (which was released in 1997) several changes to the band were made. Bass player Andrew Larson departed and was replaced by Eric Campuzano (The Prayer Chain). In addition, Wayne Everett, also of The Prayer Chain, became the band's studio drummer. Campuzano left the band before it began touring to support the new album. Replacing him was Jeff Cloud, who had been Starflyer's touring manager. Americana had a more rock bent than the band's previous two albums with more uplifting and explicitly religious lyrics.

=== 1998–2001: Change in sound with The Fashion Focus ===
The release of The Fashion Focus in 1998 signaled a significant change in the direction of the band's sound, largely due to the influence of producer Gene Eugene. Where previous albums had emphasized guitars and loud rock and roll, The Fashion Focus was a significantly softer album. This album featured the introduction of keyboards in the music, which replaced layered guitars. The new sound was more pop-friendly than earlier albums, while not abandoning the signature Starflyer sound. The song "Too Much Fun" would be the band's last song in the early shoegazing style. Everybody Makes Mistakes, released the next year, continued in the same direction as The Fashion Focus.

On November 21, 2000, Starflyer 59 released Easy Come, Easy Go, a two-disc "best-of" set. The first disc consisted of the band's most popular songs from their first five LPs (three songs from each album), while the second disc was a collection of rarities, B-sides, and eight songs from a live performance. 2001 saw the release of Leave Here A Stranger, Starflyer's next full-length album. The band's sound continued to evolve, as Leave Here A Stranger would come to be lauded and praised by many music critics as Starflyer 59's best release to date. After the untimely death of Gene Eugene, Martin called on long-time musical hero Terry Scott Taylor to take over production of the new album. In a tribute to the Beach Boys' monumental album Pet Sounds, Leave Here a Stranger was recorded in mono.

=== 2002–2008: Extensive album production ===
From 2003 to 2006, Starflyer 59 released one full-length album a year, all of them self-produced. The first of these albums was Old. Old maintained a more pop-oriented sound that had begun with The Fashion Focus, but was also more guitar-oriented than Leave Here A Stranger. However, the music of Old was still significantly softer than the band's early work. In 2004, I Am the Portuguese Blues was released. With this album, Starflyer 59 returned to the heavy guitar format that was so prominent on their early albums Silver, Gold, and Americana, as well as to the monochromatic album covers that had characterized these albums. I Am the Portuguese Blues was not a true follow-up to Old, but instead was a set of older songs that Jason Martin had written for a follow-up album to Americana. The material was originally shelved when the band shifted gears and instead recorded The Fashion Focus. This confused many newer fans and critics who were familiar with Starflyer 59's more recent pop-friendly work. The album is generally thought of as an EP or side project and not a proper Starflyer 59 studio album, and to date is the last time guitar distortion was featured on a Starflyer 59 recording.

2005's Talking Voice vs. Singing Voice saw the band change their sound yet again, to a style that seemed a more natural follow-up to Old than I Am the Portuguese Blues had been. For this album, Starflyer 59 was cut down to two members: Jason Martin and drummer Frank Lenz. It would be the first studio album since Americana to be recorded without bassist and ideas man Jeff Cloud. Despite having only two band members, the songs on Talking Voice vs. Singing Voice have a full sound. This is largely due to the inclusion of guest string players on many of the album's tracks. Also in 2005, Starflyer 59 re-issued digitally re-mastered versions of Silver and Gold, with bonus tracks. The re-issue of Silver came with the tracks of the band's follow-up EP, She's the Queen. Gold was reissued with the Goodbyes Are Sad 7 inch single and three of the four tracks from the Le Vainqueur EP. Many of these extra tracks, however, had been included on the 2-disc set Easy Come, Easy Go.

Frank Lenz left the band near the end of the recording process, leaving Jason Martin as the only member. Josh Dooley re-joined the band as second guitar, the first time in the band's history with a guitar player other than Martin, and Trey Many joined as the drummer. This threesome toured very briefly behind Talking Voice vs. Singing Voice with an electronic bass track.

The band released their follow up to Talking Voice vs. Singing Voice titled My Island September 12, 2006, along with a music video for the album's single, "I Win". As the years go by, Starflyer 59 continue to release albums that seem to be a natural progression of the previous album, with the exception of I Am the Portuguese Blues. In 2007, Starflyer 59 had a special promotion among the most devoted fans, where they would release a total of 10 7-inch vinyl records over a period of months. Each 7" would contain a song from the forthcoming record, as well as a B-side that would be released only for the promotion. The 10 vinyl records, known as Ghosts of the Future, came with a custom wooden record box, and early buyers were rewarded with inserts signed by Jason Martin and Scott Hatch. Their 11th full-length album, Dial M, was released on October 28, 2008. Dial M consisted of the first track of each vinyl record from Ghosts of the Future, remixed and cleaned up. The album was significantly influenced by the passing of Jason's father, affectionately referred to in the song Mr. Martin.

=== 2009–present: The Changing of the Guard and further projects ===
The band released The Changing of the Guard on August 10, 2010. After the passing of his father, Jason Martin took over the day-to-day operations of his father's trucking business in Riverside, California. Because of this responsibility, Starflyer 59 no longer actively toured as of 2010.

The band's next album, IAMACEO, was released on December 17, 2012 (Jason Martin's 40th birthday). This album was crowdfunded through Kickstarter. When the fund-raising campaign began on March 6, 2012, all the funds necessary for the project were raised within just a few hours.

In July, it was discovered by fans that T.W. Walsh – who mastered and performed on IAMACEO – had added a new Starflyer 59 release under the 2015 section of his website. In August, a member of the Facebook fan group mentioned that he talked to former Starflyer 59 bassist Eric Campuzano about the new Starflyer material. Campuzano said, "The new Starflyer 59 album is going to be killer. Lots of the older style coming out. The demos I've heard are amazing." When mentioned in the Starflyer 59 fan forums, musician Mike Adams hinted at a new Starflyer 59 record, saying he knew "every intimate detail about the new [Starflyer 59] release," and that it was coming out in October 2015. He also shared a mysterious image that fans presume to be album art.

On April 26, 2019, Young in My Head was released through Tooth & Nail. It was released on CD and vinyl, including limited edition versions, as well as digitally. For this recording, Jason's son (credited as C. Martin) played drums, and longtime member Steven Dail played bass. TW Walsh provided synth as a guest musician.

On May 14, 2020, Velvet Blue Music released the single "This Recliner" to promote the EP Miami, which was released on June 19, 2020 and included three new songs and two reworked versions of songs from Young in My Head. On October 15, 2021, Starflyer 59 released Vanity through Velvet Blue Music digitally, as well as on CD and vinyl.

On May 9, 2024 (5/9 Day), a new release was teased on the band's Facebook page. Lust for Gold will be released on Velvet Blue Music as catalog number VBM 235. No other information, including release date, was provided. Lust for Gold was released on August 16, 2024. The first single, 909 was released July 19, 2024. 909 refers to the area code for the Riverside, California area during the band's early years. The 909 area code was created in 1992, just before the band's founding (later, western Riverside County was split off from 909 and assigned area code 951 on July 17, 2004).

On January 2, 2025, a new album release was posted to the band's Bandcamp page. `Déjame Dormir` was released on Velvet Blue Music as catalog number VBM 241. The album re-imagines their own tracks as soft & gentle, sleepy & dreamy lullabies.

== Side projects ==
Jason Martin's side projects include:

- Bon Voyage
- Pony Express, with Jeff Cloud, Richard Swift, Frank Lenz, and Josh Dooley
- Starflyer 2000, with Leigh Nash
- Enemy Ships
- Neon Horse
- Low and Behold, with Ryan Clark of Demon Hunter
- The Brothers Martin, with Jason's brother Ronnie of Joy Electric
- Lo Tom with David Bazan, Trey Many, and TW Walsh

He has also produced albums for Fine China and MAP and performed work as a studio musician and guest musician on several albums.

== Discography ==
=== Studio albums ===
| Year | Title | Peak chart positions | |
| Year | Title | US Christ | US Heat |
|---|---|---|---|
| 1994 | Starflyer 59 (Silver): Released: March 3, 1994; Label: Tooth & Nail; Reissued in 2005 | — | — |
| 1995 | Starflyer 59 (Gold): Released: June 27, 1995; Label: Tooth & Nail; Reissued in 2005 | — | — |
| 1997 | Americana: Released: March 11, 1997; Label: Tooth & Nail | — | — |
| 1998 | The Fashion Focus: Released: October 6, 1998; Label: Tooth & Nail | — | — |
| 1999 | Everybody Makes Mistakes: Released: November 16, 1999; Label: Tooth & Nail | — | — |
| 2001 | Leave Here a Stranger: Released: June 9, 2001; Label: Tooth & Nail | — | — |
| 2003 | Old: Released: May 20, 2003; Label: Tooth & Nail | — | — |
| 2004 | I Am the Portuguese Blues: Released: February 24, 2004; Label: Tooth & Nail | — | — |
| 2005 | Talking Voice vs. Singing Voice: Released: April 12, 2005; Label: Tooth & Nail | — | — |
| 2006 | My Island: Released: September 12, 2006; Label: Tooth & Nail | — | — |
| 2008 | Dial M: Released: October 28, 2008; Label: Tooth & Nail | — | — |
| 2010 | The Changing of the Guard: Released: August 10, 2010; Label: Tooth & Nail | — | — |
| 2013 | IAMACEO: Released: January 8, 2013; Label: South Co. (independent) | — | — |
| 2016 | Slow: Released: June 17, 2016; Label: Tooth & Nail | 24 | 17 |
| 2019 | Young in My Head: Released: April 26, 2019; Label: Tooth & Nail | 20 | 4 |
| 2021 | Vanity: Released: October 15, 2021; Label: Velvet Blue Music | — | — |
| 2024 | Lust for Gold: Released: August 16, 2024; Label: Velvet Blue Music | — | — |
"—" denotes releases that did not chart.

=== EPs ===
- She's the Queen (1994)
- Le Vainqueur (1995)
- Fell in Love at 22 (1999)
- Can't Stop Eating (2002)
- Old Demos (2003)
- The Last Laurel (2004)
- I Win (2006)
- Minor Keys (2009)
- Miami (2020)
- Disappointed (2026)

=== Split EPs ===
- The Rocky Valentines / Starflyer 59 Split (2023)

=== Live albums ===
- Plugged (1996)
- Live at the Paradox (2002)
- Never Play Covers (2005)
- Live at Schubas II (2006; offered only on eMusic.com)

=== Re-recording albums ===
- Déjame Dormir (2025)

=== 12-inch releases ===
- "Gold" (1995, Tooth & Nail Records)
- "Americana" (1997, Tooth & Nail Records)
- "The Fashion Focus" (12-inch + bonus 7-inch) (1999, Velvet Blue Music / Burnt Toast Vinyl)
- "Everybody Makes Mistakes" (12-inch + bonus 7-inch) (1999, Velvet Blue Music / Burnt Toast Vinyl)
- "Leave Here a Stranger" (2001, ABC Group Documentation)
- "Portuguese Blues" (2004, Burnt Toast Vinyl)
- "The Last Laurel" (2005, Republic of Texas Recordings / Somewherecold Records)
- "Talking Voice vs. Singing Voice" (2005, Burnt Toast Vinyl)
- "Dial M" (with bonus track) (2008, Burnt Toast Vinyl)
- "Silver" (2009, Crossroads of America Records)
- "Old" (2010, Crossroads of America Records)
- "The Changing of the Guard" (12-inch + bonus 7-inch) (2010, Burnt Toast Vinyl)
- "IAMACEO" (2013)
- "Slow" (2016, Tooth & Nail Records)
- "Young in My Head" (color variants: black, outlaw gold, old blood red) (2019, Tooth & Nail Records)

=== Singles (7-inch vinyl) ===
- "The Drop" (1993)
- "Goodbyes Are Sad" (1995)
- "Bonus 7-inch w/ The Fashion Focus 12-inch" (1999)
- "Bonus 7-inch w/ Everybody Makes Mistakes 12-inch" (1999)
- "Bonus 7-inch w/ The Changing of the Guard 12-inch" (2010)
- "Like a Baby" 7-inch split w/ "Mike Adams at His Honest Weight" (2015)
- "Told Me So" (2016)
- "Terror" (2017)
- "This Recliner" (2020)
- "Life in Bed" (2021)
- "Like to Lose" (2021)
- "Sunrise" (2021)

=== Box sets ===
- Easy Come, Easy Go (2000)
- Ghosts of the Future (2007; 10 record 7-inch vinyl series, released through Burnt Toast Vinyl)
- Ghosts of the Past (2009; includes Ghosts of the Future)

=== Appearances on compilations ===
- A Steve Taylor Tribute: I Predict a Clone (CD) (1994, R.E.X. Music)
- Happy Christmas (CD) (1998, BEC Recordings)
- When Worlds Collide: A Tribute to Daniel Amos (1999, Ferris Wheel)
- Plastiq Musiq: Electric Music Comp.1 (CD) (1999, Plastiq Musiq)
- Happy Christmas Vol. 2 (CD) (1999, BEC Recordings)
- Start Right Here: Remembering the Life of Keith Green (CD) (2001, BEC Recordings)
- Happy Christmas Vol.3 (CD) (2001, BEC Recordings)
- A Live Tribute Recording for Gene Eugene (CD) (2001, Northern Records)
- Daniel Amos – When Everyone Wore Hats three-CD set (features an interview with DA frontman Terry Scott Taylor, conducted by Jason Martin)
- X 2003: Experience the Alternative (2xCD) (2003, BEC Recordings)
- Past and Present, Velvet Blue Music (2003, Velvet Blue Music)
- Neverending White Lights: ACT 1, Goodbye Friends of the Heavenly Bodies (CD) (2005, Daniel Victor)
- Happy Christmas Vol.4 (CD) (2005, Tooth & Nail Records)
- You Cant Handle the Tooth! Vol. 1 (2006, Tooth & Nail Records)
- Songs from the Penalty Box, Tooth and Nail Vol. 6 (2009, Tooth & Nail Records)

== Books ==
- When I Learn to Sing (songbook/fake book) (2005)

== Members ==
Current members

- Jason Martin – guitar, vocal
- Trey Many – drums (Velour 100, White Lighter and His Name is Alive)
- Steven Dail – bass guitar (Project 86, White Lighter and Crash Rickshaw)

Former members and players

- Andrew Larson – bass guitar (Silver – Gold)
- Eric Campuzano – bass guitar (Americana)
- Jeff Cloud – bass guitar (The Fashion Focus – Everybody Makes Mistakes – Leave Here A Stranger – Old – I Am the Portuguese Blues)
- Dan Reid – drums (Silver)
- Ed Giles Benrock – drums (Gold)
- Wayne Everett – drums (Gold – Americana – The Fashion Focus – Everybody Makes Mistakes)
- Joey Esquibel – drums (Leave Here a Stranger)
- Josh Dooley – keyboards (Leave Here a Stranger), guitar (My Island)
- Richard Swift – keyboards (Old) (d. 2018)
- Frank Lenz – drums (Old – Talking Voice vs. Singing Voice)
- Gene Eugene – keys, mixing and production (Gold – Americana – Everybody Makes Mistakes)
