= Jeff Cloud (musician) =

American bass guitarist

Jeff Cloud is an American former bass guitar player for rock band Starflyer 59. He joined the band after the album Americana had been recorded, and remained a member until after the recording of the album I Am the Portuguese Blues. From 1996 until 2002, Cloud was member of the electropop/synth-pop group Joy Electric. Cloud currently fronts his own band called Pony Express and has owned and operated an independent label called Velvet Blue Music since 1996, touting bands such as Fine China, Map, and Frank Lenz.
