= Jason Martin (musician) =

American musician

- Born: December 17, 1973 (age 52)
- Occupations: Singer; guitarist; drummer
- Years active: 1993–present
- Musical career
- Genres: Alternative rock; Christian rock; shoegaze; indie rock; dream pop; indie pop; post-punk revival
- Instruments: Vocals, guitar, drums
- Member of: Starflyer 59

Jason Martin (born December 17, 1973) is an American musician from Southern California. He is best known as band frontman and founding member of alternative rock band Starflyer 59, being one of the first bands to sign with Tooth & Nail Records. As well as making music and touring, Martin also runs a business as a truck driver, which he took over from his father.

Martin's style of music has been dubbed "shoegazing", a word used originally in reference to the distorted electric guitar reminiscent of British bands in the late '80s and early '90s. Martin has also been a member of several side project bands, including Bon Voyage, The Pony Express, The Brothers Martin and Neon Horse.

Martin is the only member of Starflyer 59 who has played on every one of the band's albums. Earlier in his life he played with his brother, Ronnie Martin, in the synthpop based Dance House Children. Martin and Ronnie reunited in the studio in 2006 to record The Brothers Martin, combining both of the current styles from Starflyer 59 and Joy Electric. The CD was released January 23, 2007. He released a new shoegaze project, Low & Behold (released October 31, 2015), with Ryan Clark of Demon Hunter on Northern Records.

In 2008, Martin stated that the lifetime average sales of Starflyer 59 albums were approximately 10,000 copies each, with earlier albums getting more sales. As of 2003, his favorite written song was "Give Up the War" from 2001 studio album Leave Here a Stranger. His favourite studio album as of 2008 was The Fashion Focus, with his least favorite being Silver. Martin's favorite song to play live is "Play the C Chord," from 1999 studio album Everybody Makes Mistakes.

== Personal life ==
Martin is a Reformed Christian, and he dedicates "All praise and glory to Jesus Christ our Lord and Savior" (Note: For example, in the liner notes for 2024 studio album Lust for Gold.) in the liner notes of all his albums. Discussing the topic of lyrics with World, he claims that his "faith in Christ is very important ... but I don't want to shove the Lord's name into a song to appear 'spiritual.' In a way, to me, that would be taking His name in vain."

== Bands ==
- Starflyer 59
- Bon Voyage
- Dance House Children
- Lo Tom
- Low & Behold
- Neon Horse
- Pony Express
- Red Strat
- The Brothers Martin
- Morellas Forest (1988)
- Enemy Ships (A.K.A "The Emergency.") (Never Officially released)
- Nova Satori (Played Drums)
