= The Magic Christian =

(The) Magic Christian may refer to:

- Magic Christian (magician) (born 1945)
- Magic Christian Music, an album by Badfinger featuring three songs from the 1969 film
- The Magic Christian (film), a 1969 film
- The Magic Christian (novel), a 1959 comic novel by Terry Southern
- Phil Cristian, an American keyboardist and singer, known as Magic Cristian in rock band Cheap Trick

== See also ==
- Christian magic (disambiguation)
- The Magic of Christmas (disambiguation)
- Christmas Magic (disambiguation)
