= Starcadia =

EP by Joy Electric
- Released: April 2002
- Recorded: The Electric Joy Toy Company
- Genre: Synthpop/Electropop
- Length: 13:29
- Label: Plastiq Musiq
- Producer: Ronnie Martin

Joy Electric chronology
| The White Songbook (2001) | Starcadia (2002) | The Art and Craft of Popular Music (2002) |

Professional ratings
Review scores
| Source | Rating |
|---|---|
| HM Magazine | |

Starcadia is an EP by Joy Electric. The concept of Starcadia is based upon rides that have existed in Disneyland: Matterhorn Bobsleds, Space Mountain, Starcade, Submarine Voyage, and Carousel of Progress. Musically it was described as "more cosmic and spacey" than the band's prior releases.

== Track listing ==
(all songs written by Ronnie Martin)

1. "The Matterhorn" – 2:00
2. "Starcadia" – 3:44
3. "Dance to Moroder" – 3:14
4. "Circa 1978" – 2:04
5. "The Carousel of Progress" – 2:26
