= Christian magic =

Christian magic may refer to:

- Christian views on magic
- Christo-Paganism, a syncretic new religious movement defined by the combination of Christian and neopagan beliefs and practices
- Esoteric Christianity, a mystical approach to Christianity that features "secret traditions" that require an initiation to learn or understand
- Gospel magic, the use of otherwise standard stage magic tricks and illusions as object lessons to promote Christian messages

== See also ==
- Christmas Magic (disambiguation)
- The Magic Christian (disambiguation)
- The Magic of Christmas (disambiguation)
- Enochian magic (angelic magic)
- Goetia (magic) (demonic magic)
- Islam and magic
- Jewish magic (disambiguation)
- Thaumaturgy (miraculous magic)
- Theurgy (divine magic)
