= Hello, Mannequin =

Studio album by Joy Electric
- Released: June 1, 2004
- Recorded: The Electric Joy Toy Company
- Genres: Synthpop, electropop
- Length: 56:33
- Label: Tooth & Nail Records
- Producer: Ronnie Martin

Joy Electric chronology
The Magic of Christmas (2003)	Hello, Mannequin (2004)	Friend of Mannequin (2004)

Hello, Mannequin is the seventh album released by Joy Electric.

Hello, Mannequin is the third release in the Legacy series and was created using the Roland System 100 synthesizer. It is the final Joy Electric album to be created using the System 100.

== Reception ==
Professional ratings
Review scores
Source	Rating
Allmusic	3/5 stars
The Phantom Tollbooth	4.5/5 stars
Jesus Freak Hideout	5/5 stars

In its album review, The Orange County Register described Joy Electric's sound: "Think early Depeche Mode meets '80s synth pop meets Star Trek sound effects." It said that "those who dig experimental records should embrace it."

== Track listing ==
1. "Hello, Mannequin" – 1:58
2. "Disloyalist Party" – 4:26
3. "The Works of Unknowns" – 4:53
4. "The Singing Arc" – 4:06
5. "Song for All Time" – 3:51
6. "The Birth of the Telegram, 1814" – 3:17
7. "Who Are Friends?" – 4:04
8. "Wolf in the Bend" – 4:57
9. "From Mount Chorus" – 3:13
10. "The Phonograph Plays, Part and Parcel" – 4:02
11. "Nikola Tesla" – 4:38
12. "Post Calendar" – 4:28
13. "I Am a Pioneer" – 3:52
14. "A Page of Life" – 4:48
