= Storybook Love (disambiguation) =

"Storybook Love" is a song from the soundtrack to The Princess Bride, a 1987 film.

Storybook Love may also refer to:

- "Storybook Love" (This Is Us), a 2019 television episode
- "Storybook Love" (Fables), a comic book arc published as a collected edition in 2004
- "Storybook Love", a song from the 1972 Patridge Family album The Partridge Family Notebook
- "Storybook Love", a song from the 1997 Joy Electric album Robot Rock
