= Roland System 100 =

Semi-modular synthesizer released in 1975

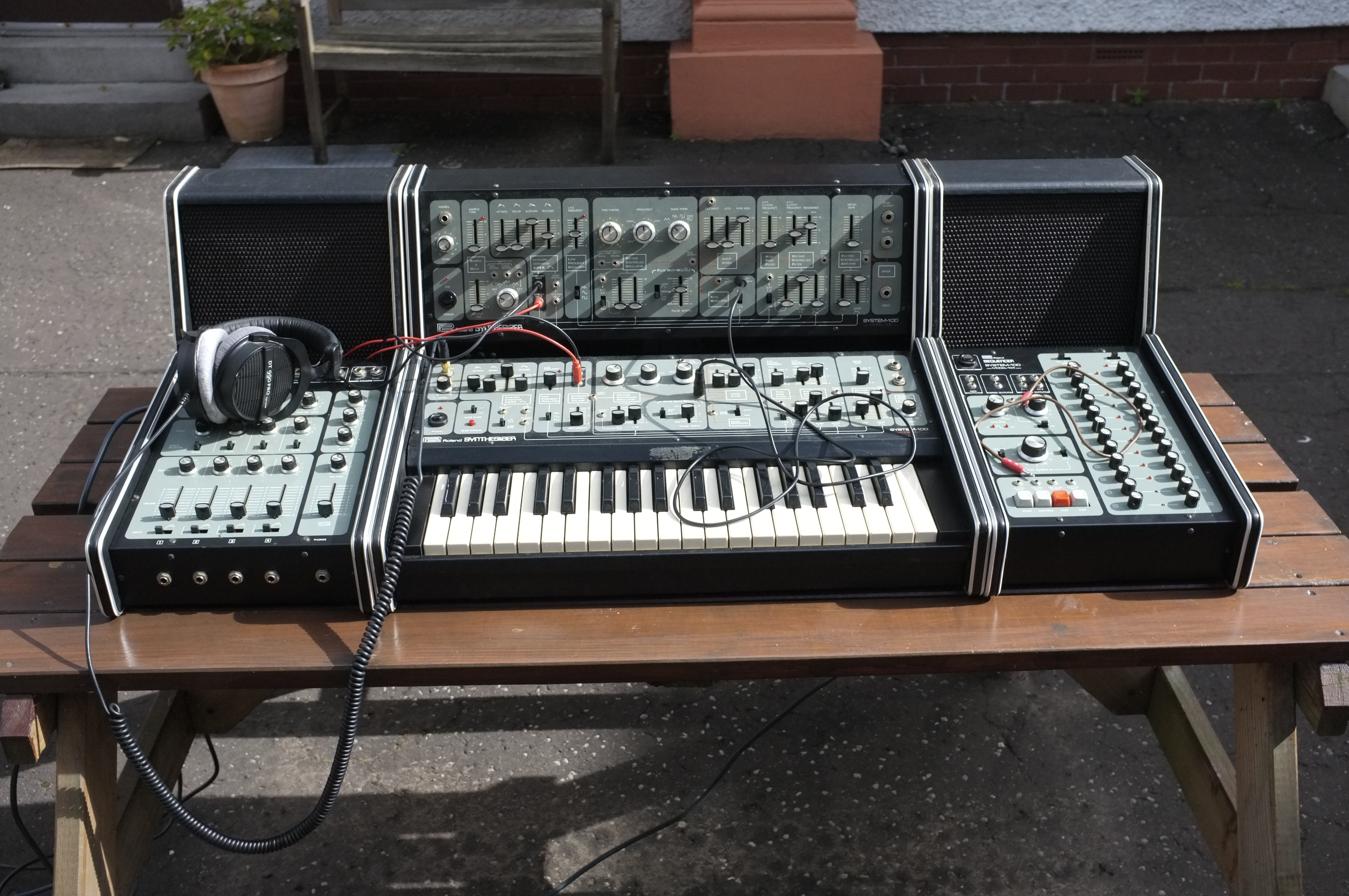
Roland System 100

The Roland System 100 was an analog semi-modular synthesizer (having an internal fixed signal path that could be overridden by plugging patch cables into the front of the synth) manufactured by Japan's Roland Corporation, released in 1975 and manufactured until 1979. It consisted of the following products:

Synthesizer 101 A monophonic synthesizer with built-in keyboard, oscillator, filter, ADSR envelope generator and attenuator.

Expander 102 The same synthesizer again, without the keyboard, to be stood up behind the 101 and patched into it in order to double its features. In addition, a ring modulator and sample and hold are included.

Mixer 103 A four-channel stereo mixer with built-in spring reverb, stereo panning, and mono FX send/return.

Sequencer 104 A two-channel, 12-step sequencer to automate playing looped bars of notes.

Monitor speaker 109 A pair of 16cm speakers.

PCS-10 20cm, 40cm, 60cm, 80cm and 1m patch cables.

While the System 100 was not fully modular, unlike the later Roland System-100M and the Roland System 700, a complete system nevertheless formed an expandable two-oscillator monosynth with sequencing, monitoring and effects capabilities. Each unit was independently powered, so complex patches wouldn't cause either oscillator to drop in pitch. Uniquely for the time, the System 100 didn't "lock in" the oscillators to fixed footages or pitches, allowing greater flexibility for sound design. It uses the 1V/oct standard, so can be used with a MIDI-to-CV converter.

The System 100 is still sought-after due to its filter, sequencer and patching capabilities, though the oscillators can be unstable at the lower frequencies, and the keyboard is prone to mis-triggering and double-triggering if not used regularly. Generally, however, it is a robust and reliable system. The SH-5 and SH-7 are similar in styling, but both have fixed signal paths, as opposed to the semi-modular System 100.

== Notable users ==
The system was notably used by Mute Records label head Daniel Miller, who helped produce Depeche Mode's A Broken Frame; and by The Human League (MK1 incarnation). Specifically, the albums Reproduction and Travelogue used a large System 100 (1 x 101, 2 x 102, 2 x 104, 1 x 103) multitracked to provide nearly all the arrangements, including drums and percussion. The K2 Plan (Shekhar Raj Dhain) used it extensively in a similar vein, multitracked and with the sequencer providing odd syncopations and effects. Joy Electric's The White Songbook album (2001) was created by using a System 100 exclusively.

Another notable user was Martyn Ware, a founding member of The Human League and Heaven 17. In his 2020 interview with Vince Clarke for the podcast "Electronically Yours with Martyn Ware", Ware revealed that Clarke had sent Ware a complete System 100 as a gift, to replace the system Ware had previously owned in the 1980s but had subsequently sold.
