= Christian Songs (album) =

Studio album by Joy Electric
- Released: April 20, 1999
- Recorded: The Electric Joy Toy Company, June 1998–January 1999
- Genre: Synthpop/Electropop
- Length: 39:44
- Label: BEC Recordings
- Producer: Ronnie Martin

Joy Electric chronology
Children of the Lord (1999)	Christian Songs (1999)	Unelectric (2000)

Professional ratings
Review scores
Source	Rating
Allmusic	4/5 stars
The Phantom Tollbooth	4/5 stars
Jesus Freak Hideout	4/5 stars
Exit Zine	5/5 stars

Christian Songs (styled CHRISTIANsongs) is the fourth studio album by the electropop band Joy Electric. A music video was recorded for "Children of the Lord." In 2006, it was rereleased on iTunes, along with Robot Rock and Melody. This album remains to this day the most overtly spiritual Joy Electric release, as the title suggests. Tracks such as "The Magic Of" and "Singing in Gee" maintain the distinct fantasy theme from Joy Electric's previous two albums, whereas tracks such as "Children of the Lord" and the cover "Make My Life a Prayer" speak in very plain and certain terms of Martin's devotion to God.

== Track listing ==
(all songs written by Ronnie Martin except where noted)

1. "The Voice of the Young" – 2:49
2. "Children of the Lord" – 3:21
3. "Disco for a Ride" – 3:36
4. "Lift Up Your Hearts" – 2:09
5. "I Sing Electric" – 3:42
6. "Make My Life a Prayer" (Melody Green) – 3:09
7. "Singing in Gee" – 5:18
8. "True Harmony" – 2:03
9. "The Magic Of" – 5:04
10. "Synthesized I Want You Synthesized" – 3:48
11. "Birds Will Sing Forever" – 4:40

The pre-release promotional CD contained a slightly different track order, omitting "Make My Life A Prayer":

1. "The Voice of the Young"
2. "Lift Up Your Hearts"
3. "Disco for a Ride"
4. "Children of the Lord"
5. "I Sing Electric"
6. "Singing in Gee"
7. "True Harmony"
8. "The Magic Of"
9. "Synthesized I Want You Synthesized"
10. "Birds Will Sing Forever"

(The cover insert for the promo CD had the same layout as the final version, but used the photos that ended up on the back cover of the final CD booklet.)

== Personnel ==
- Ronnie Martin – vocals, synthesizers, vocoder
- Jeff Cloud – synthesizer, tape machine
- Caleb Mannan – percussion synthesizer
