= Old Wives Tales =

Old wives' tales may refer to:

- Old wives' tales, sayings of popular wisdom (usually incorrect) passed down from generation to generation
- Old Wives Tales (extended play), a 1996 EP by Joy Electric
- Old Wives Tales (bookstore), a feminist bookstore in San Francisco
