= Robot Rock =

Robot Rock may refer to:

- Robot Rock (album), a 1997 album by Joy Electric
- "Robot Rock" (song), the first single from Daft Punk's 2005 album Human After All
- A repetitive, trance-like subgenre of desert rock which emerged in the late 1990s and early 2000s
