= Happiest Homecoming on Earth =

50th anniversary celebration of Disneyland

The Happiest Homecoming on Earth or the Happiest Celebration on Earth was the eighteen-month-long celebration (May 5, 2005 through September 30, 2006) of the 50th anniversary of the Disneyland theme park, which opened on July 17, 1955. It commemorated fifty years of Disney theme parks and celebrated Disneyland's milestone throughout Disney parks all over the globe. The "Homecoming" name was only used for Disneyland Resort; all the other Disney Parks resorts (Walt Disney World Resort, Tokyo Disney Resort, Disneyland Resort Paris, and Hong Kong Disneyland Resort) used the "Celebration" name.

== Happiest Homecoming on Earth (Disneyland) ==
Sleeping Beauty Castle with its 50th Anniversary Overlay

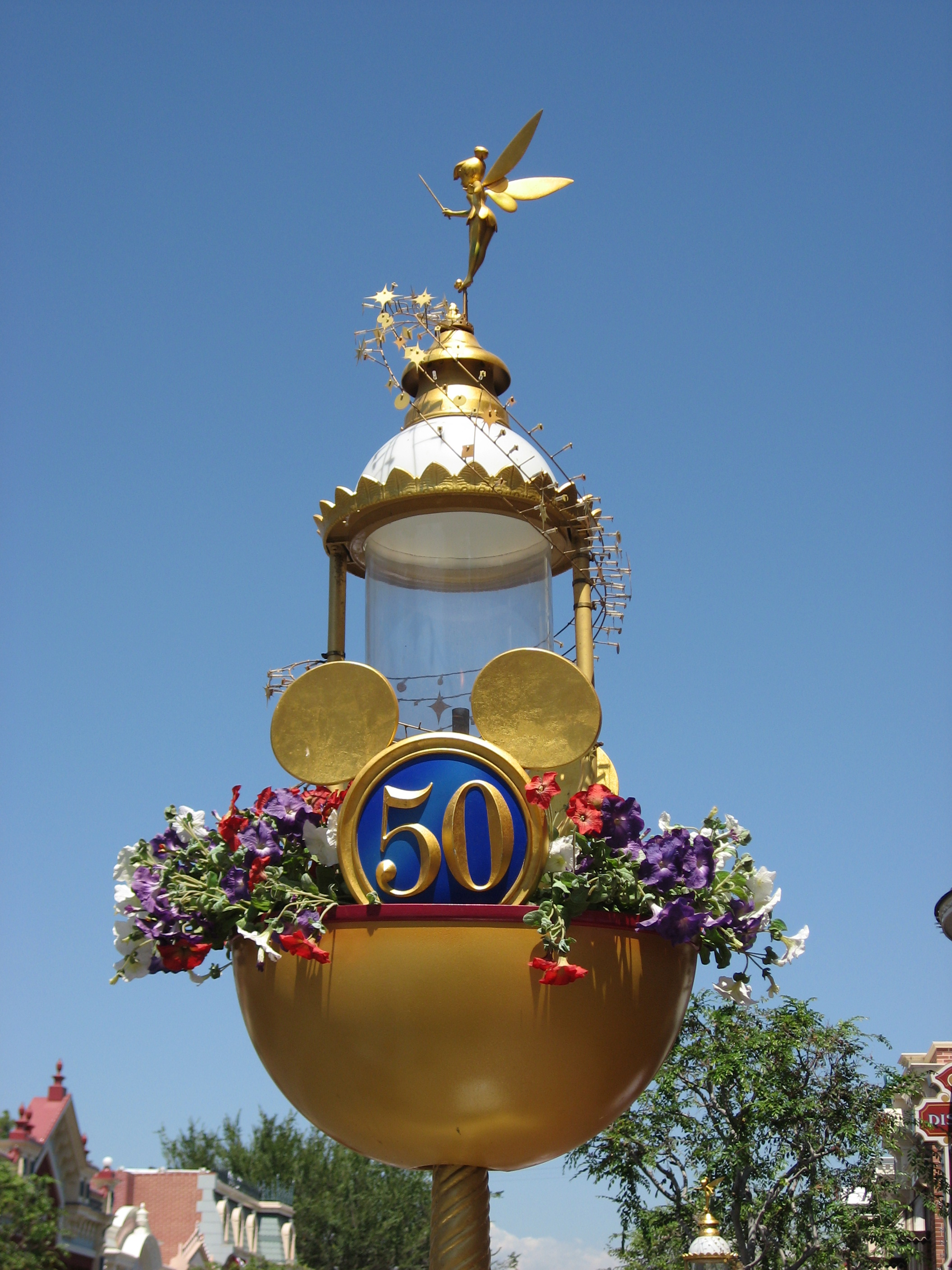
Lamp post with 50th Anniversary decor.

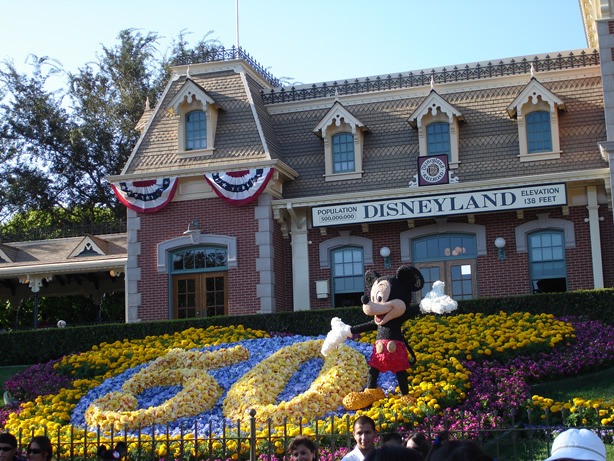
Flowers outside Main Street, U.S.A. train station during 50th celebration

Disneyland's 50th anniversary was July 17, 2005, but the celebration was launched on May 5, 2005 in front of Sleeping Beauty Castle.

=== May 4, 2005 ===
Disneyland Park was actually closed to the public on this date, the first planned closure of the park in decades for a special media preview. Disney allowed guests staying at the three Disney-owned hotels to become "extras" for all the media filming going on, though they only were notified by a letter delivered in the middle of the night, so they had no advance notice.

=== May 5, 2005 ===
The Happiest Homecoming on Earth ceremony officially began with a dedication from then-Disney CEO Michael Eisner. The ceremony included fireworks; speeches from Julie Andrews (official ambassador for the 50th anniversary celebrations), and Art Linkletter (original TV anchor for the opening day broadcast); a performance of "When You Wish Upon A Star" by Christina Aguilera; and LeAnn Rimes singing the 50th anniversary theme song "Remember When", composed by Richard Marx. A video conference featured celebrities at the Magic Kingdom (the only live video conference, with Wayne Brady, actor and former Walt Disney World Resort cast member), Tokyo Disneyland, Disneyland Paris and the construction site of Hong Kong Disneyland. Featured over 40 children singers from the Southern California Children's Chorus directed by Lori Loftus singing the song It's A Small World and all the four theme parks and Mary Poppins joined the sing-along singing in their own language.

Before the ceremony, at a media presentation in Disney California Adventure Park, Disneyland Resort president Matt Ouimet announced the new attractions Monsters, Inc.: Mike and Sully to the Rescue and Turtle Talk with Crush.

=== July 17, 2005 ===
The actual day of Disneyland's 50th Dedication Day/Press Preview was an event marked by fans' enthusiasm. The first person to enter the park that day was Madison Steigerwald, a 16-year-old girl from Old Greenwich, CT. She and her grandmother, Mary Madison, began to line up at 3 p.m. the day before. Due to the thousands of fans that continued to line up through the night, Disney California Adventure Park was opened and housed everyone until the next morning. A second line formed outside the security checkpoints as thousands more arrived in the final hours before the park opened. Disneyland Park opened at 7:00 a.m., although it took several hours to admit the crowds that showed up that morning.

=== Preparations ===
In 2004, Disneyland Resort President Matt Ouimet and hundreds of cast members posed for an aerial photo above Disneyland, with each person holding a nine square foot photograph of a Disneyland cast member. When seen from above the placards formed an image of Mickey Mouse, making it the largest photographic mosaic ever created. This initiated the Happiest Faces on Earth in which over thirty giant mosaics of Disney tableaus were displayed at locations around Disneyland and California Adventure composed of photos submitted by guests from the past fifty years. All the mosaics were created by California artist Roy Feinson.

Many classic Disneyland attractions re-opened in 2005 after lengthy refurbishments, such as Walt Disney's Enchanted Tiki Room, the Jungle Cruise and Space Mountain. A new fireworks show, Remember... Dreams Come True, replaced the former Believe... There's Magic in the Stars. Walt Disney's Parade of Dreams replaced the Parade of Stars and featured elaborate floats with lighting that allowed daytime or nighttime performances. Buzz Lightyear Astro Blasters opened in Tomorrowland (at a ceremony with Tim Allen, the voice of Toy Story character Buzz Lightyear), and a new parade featuring Pixar characters, Block Party Bash was featured at Disney's California Adventure. Comedian and ex-Disneyland cast member Steve Martin opened the Disneyland: The First 50 Magical Years exhibition and film, in which he features with Donald Duck. The original attractions which opened with the park also had one of their ride vehicles painted gold for the celebration. The park also contained 50 Hidden Mickeys, golden Mickey Mouse heads with "50" displayed in the middle, sometimes disguised as part of the surrounding theme.

Other refurbishments took place around Disneyland with many areas being re-painted and refurbished to their former glory. The second phase of the re-paint of Tomorrowland commenced after the base silver and blue scheme was laid. Main Street USA and Sleeping Beauty Castle were repainted, and the castle was specially decorated for the celebration. The celebration brought record numbers of guests to the parks, numbers unmatched since the fall of 1996, when mass crowds flooded the park to catch a glimpse of the Main Street Electrical Parade before it went into permanent retirement until 2017.

=== Into 2006 ===
In the second half of the celebration, on January 23, 2006, Monsters, Inc. Mike & Sulley to the Rescue! opened at Disney's California Adventure. On July 7, 2006, Pirates of the Caribbean: Dead Man's Chest had its world premiere on the Rivers of America, as did the first film in the trilogy in 2003. On the same day of Dead Man's Chest premiere, the Pirates of the Caribbean attraction officially reopened after lengthy refurbishments to include characters from the movie trilogy in the attraction's storyline. The 50th anniversary celebration at Disneyland ended on September 30, 2006, and was succeeded by the Year of a Million Dreams. The idea was somewhat revised for the Disneyland Diamond Celebration promotion that was used for the 60th anniversary 10 years after the kickoff for the homecoming.

== Theme song ==
To commemorate the 50th anniversary of Disneyland, the official anthem song was written by Richard Marx, and was performed for the first time live by Grammy-winning artist LeAnn Rimes. It reflects on how you can never be too old to enjoy life and childhood dreams one has had. It was played immediately after the "Remember... Dreams Come True" fireworks spectacular presented throughout the 18-month anniversary celebration at Disneyland.

== Happiest Celebration on Earth ==
Beyond simply celebrating the 50th Anniversary at Disneyland alone, festivities were held at all Disney owned Theme Parks and cruise throughout the world.

=== Walt Disney World Resort ===
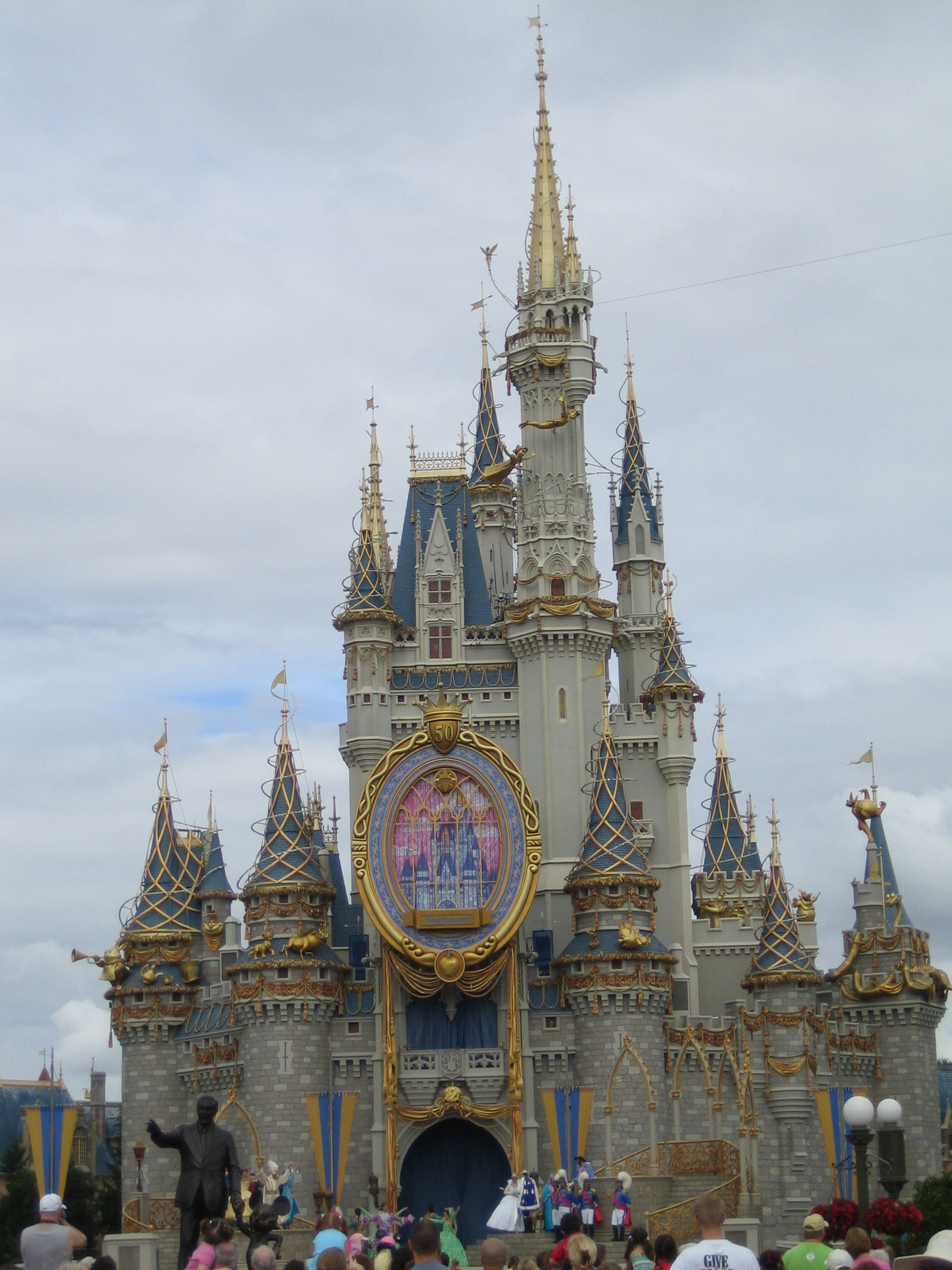
Cinderella Castle during the Happiest Homecoming on Earth

The Walt Disney World Resort introduced at least one new attraction or show at each of its four theme parks:

- Magic Kingdom received a major refurbishment of "it's a small world", A major refurbishment of Pirates of the Caribbean, a new golden overlay for Cinderella Castle, and a new playground Pooh's Playful Spot.
- Epcot received Soarin' from Disney's California Adventure and A Hong Kong Disneyland Preview Center
- Disney-MGM Studios (now Disney's Hollywood Studios) received a major refurbishment of the Streets of America area, and the now extinct Lights, Motors, Action! Extreme Stunt Show from Walt Disney Studios Park (Disneyland Resort Paris)
- Disney's Animal Kingdom temporarily exhibited Lucky the Dinosaur, the first free-roaming automatic Audio-Animatronic figure; in addition on April 7, 2006 the park opened Expedition Everest, a highly themed roller coaster through the Himalayas that features an encounter with the Yeti.

=== Tokyo Disney Resort ===
This celebration succeeded its 20th anniversary that ended in 2004:

- Tokyo Disneyland: The Rock Around the Mouse summer stage show in front of Cinderella Castle, a tribute to rock 'n' roll and Californian culture from the period that Disneyland opened; and a Golden Fiftieth Mickey at the base of the Partners statue in the hub, acknowledging its sister park's milestone.
  - Rock Around The Mouse was a temporary stage show for summer of 2005 only.
- Tokyo DisneySea: The Raging Spirits roller coaster opened in June, and the new Tower of Terror opened (it has its own new back-story, and is not themed to The Twilight Zone).

=== Disneyland Resort Paris ===
- Disneyland Park: Space Mountain received a makeover, and is now known as Space Mountain: Mission 2, with new effects and ride configurations throughout.
- Walt Disney Studios Park: A new land, Toon Studios, and The Twilight Zone: Tower of Terror opened.

=== Hong Kong Disneyland Resort ===
The fifth worldwide resort opened as part of the celebration, on September 12, 2005, with one theme park and two hotels.

=== Disney Cruise Line ===
The Disney Magic sailed to the West Coast in the summer of 2005, where it offered 12 one-week cruises from Los Angeles to the Mexican Riviera with port calls at Puerto Vallarta, Mazatlán and Cabo San Lucas. Afterward, the ship returned to its original Caribbean itinerary alongside the Disney Wonder.

== Attraction duplication ==
Walt Disney World Resort advertised the celebration by noting that the Florida property imported popular attractions or shows developed for Disney's other parks around the world.

- Magic Kingdom received an abridged version of Cinderellabration from Tokyo Disneyland using the 2003 soundtrack as Tokyo revamped the soundtrack in 2004.
- Epcot received Soarin' from Disney's California Adventure.
- Disney-MGM Studios received Lights, Motors, Action! Extreme Stunt Show from the Walt Disney Studios Paris.

Three Walt Disney World Resort attractions recently have been duplicated at four of the other Disney parks.

- Tokyo DisneySea has opened its version of the Tower of Terror.
- Disneyland Paris duplicated The Twilight Zone Tower of Terror from Disney's California Adventure.
- Disneyland Paris staged a compressed version of the Wishes fireworks developed for the Magic Kingdom for two weeks in July 2005.
- Disney's California Adventure duplicated Turtle Talk with Crush from Epcot.
- Disneyland (2005) and Disneyland Paris (2006) duplicated Buzz Lightyear Astro Blasters from both Tokyo Disneyland and Magic Kingdom.

== Season timeline ==
=== Legacy ===
- July 17, 1955 - Disneyland dedicated by Walt Disney during a private dedication event that was broadcast live on Network TV; festivities shared via telecast by hosts Art Linkletter, Ronald Reagan and Bob Cummings.
- July 18, 1955 - Disneyland public opening day, when the gates opened to the public at 10 AM PDT, and had about 50,000 guests purchase tickets.

=== 50th Anniversary ===
- 2002-2003 Several attractions were refurbished
- May 5, 2004 - Happiest Homecoming on Earth details are announced by CEO and Chairmen Michael Eisner, Bob Iger, Jay Rasulo and Julie Andrews.
- May 5, 2005 - The Happiest Homecoming on Earth officially begins at Disneyland by Michael Eisner, Matt Ouimet, Bob Iger, Julie Andrews and Art Linkletter with a live video conference between the five Magic Kingdom theme parks on three continents and performances from Christina Aguilera and LeAnn Rimes.
- July 14, 2005 - Disneyland receives a star on the Hollywood Walk of Fame with the Sleeping Beauty Castle as the special icon of the star.
- July 15, 2005 - Space Mountain re-opens at Disneyland after a one and half year refurbishment hiatus.
- July 17, 2005 - Disneyland's 50th birthday is officially commemorated with a re-dedication by Diane Disney Miller and the re-reading the plaque of her father's original dedication.
- September 12, 2005 - Hong Kong Disneyland officially opens to the public.
- September 21, 2006 - The process of removing the golden overlay from Sleeping Beauty Castle is completed.
- September 30, 2006 - The Happiest Homecoming on Earth officially concludes.
