= Happiest Faces on Earth =

The Happiest Faces on Earth was a series of photo collages around the Disneyland Resort to commemorate the 50th anniversary of Disneyland Park. In summer and fall 2004, Disney encouraged guests to send in their family pictures from Disney vacations. They could be turned in online, through the mail, and in special mailboxes located around the Disneyland Resort. The pictures were then taken and used to create mosaics of Disney characters, attractions, and art. The mosaics are located in Disneyland Park and Disney California Adventure Park. There are kiosks on Main Street, U.S.A. where guests can find the location of their photos.

Although Disney did not release the exact number of photos collected, it is believed to have been over 200,000. The series of mosaics—created by Californian artist Roy Feinson—included the first example of a tri-level mosaic in which a giant black and white mosaic of Steamboat Willie was created using 600 Disney cast member portraits. In turn, each of the portraits was made up of hundreds of guest submitted pictures. With a total of over half a million pictures it holds the record for the most complex photo collage ever created.

In mid September 2006, as the Happiest Homecoming on Earth was winding down, most of the mosaics were removed.

== See also ==
- Happiest Homecoming on Earth
