= Jewish magic =

Jewish magic may refer to:

- Ancient Jewish magic, a range of magical practices and techniques employed by Jews from the Second Temple period through the Rabbinic period
- Practical Kabbalah, a branch of the Jewish mystical tradition that concerns the use of magic
- Semitic neopaganism, a group of religions based on or attempting to reconstruct the ancient Semitic religions
- Witchcraft and divination in the Hebrew Bible

== See also ==
- Christian magic
- Enochian magic (angelic magic)
- Goetia (magic) (demonic magic)
- Islam and magic
- Thaumaturgy (miraculous magic)
- Theurgy (divine magic)
