= Five Stars for Failure =

EP by Joy Electric
- Released: November 1995
- Recorded: The Electric Joy Toy Company, 1995
- Genre: Synthpop/Electropop
- Length: 24:29
- Label: Tooth & Nail Records
- Producer: Ronnie Martin

Joy Electric chronology
Melody (1994)	Five Stars for Failure (1995)	We Are the Music Makers (1996)

Professional ratings
Review scores
Source	Rating
Allmusic	3/5 stars

Five Stars for Failure is an EP by Joy Electric. As the title would suggest, this EP contains much darker content than the preceding album, Melody. "Sorcery" originally appeared on the Tooth & Nail Records compilation @rt(c)ore Vol 1 and its sound was in the vein of "Never Be a Star" or "The Dark Ages" from Melody; the version found here is faster and more electronic-based. The original mix of "The Girl From Rosewood Lane" originally appeared on a cassette promo for Melody, prior to that album's release. This version features a stronger drum loop and an overall larger sound than the version that appears on Melody.

In 2007, the EP was re-released on iTunes.

== Track listing ==
(all songs written by Ronnie Martin)

1. "Keep Him in Your Thoughts" – 3:55
2. "Drum Machine Joy (The House in the Woods Mix)" – 3:32
3. "The Girl From Rosewood Lane (The Original Mix)" – 3:07
4. "Courage (Someday I'll Be Heard)" – 3:31
5. "Sorcery (The Stadium House Mix)" – 3:28
6. "Drum Machine Joy (The Woods Are Haunted Mix)" – 3:13
7. "Five Stars for Failure" – 3:40
