= Soviet (band) =

American electronic rock band

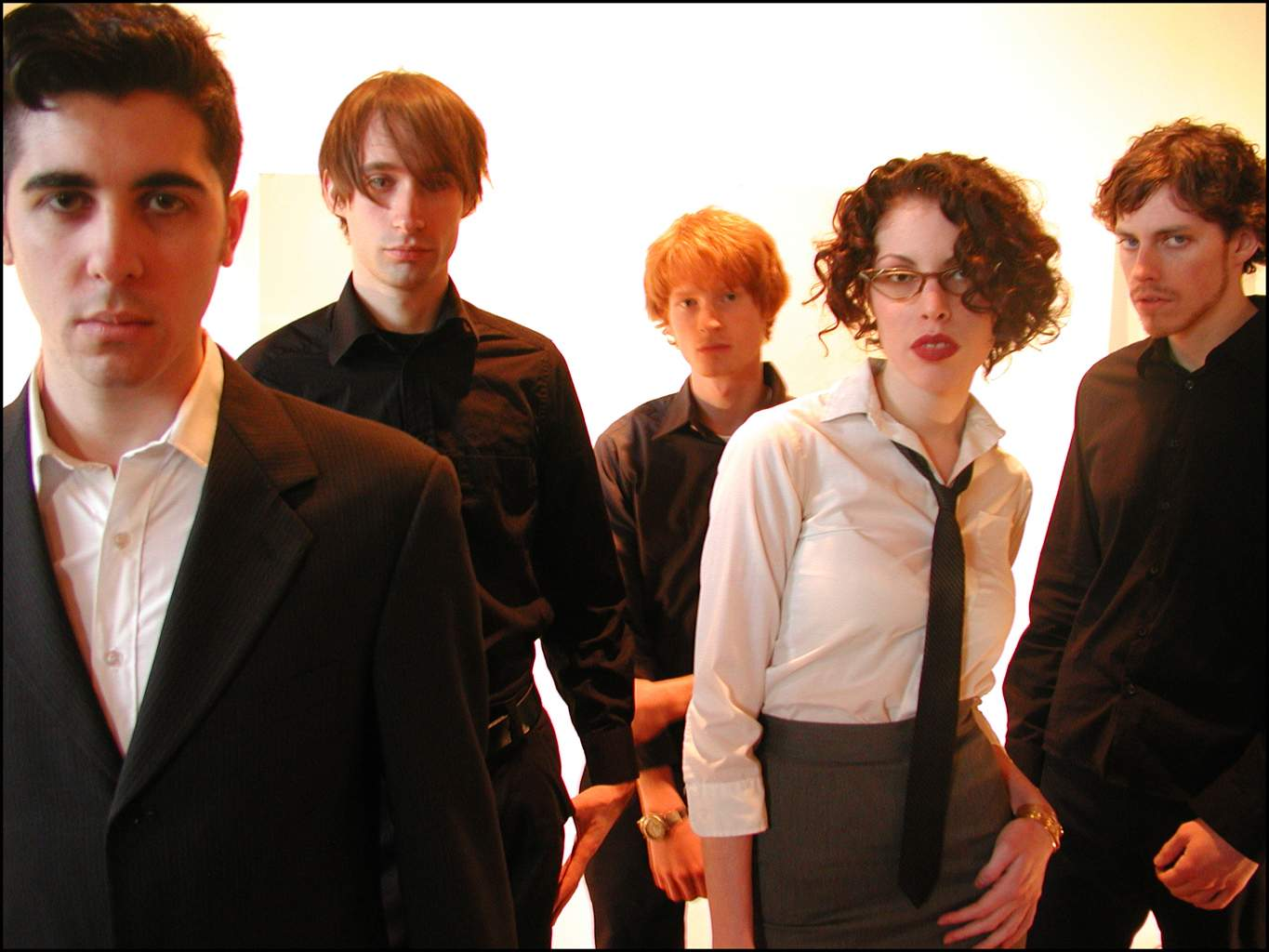
- Soviet in 2002

Background information
- Origin: Syracuse, New York
- Genres: Synthpop, new wave
- Years active: 1998–2004; 2015-–present
- Members: Keith Ruggiero, Chris Otchy, Chaz Windus
- Past members: Amanda Lynn Berkowitz; Greg Kochan; Kenan Gunduz; Ian Scheller; Adam Hughes; Christian Serramalera
- Website: sovietbot.com

Soviet is an American electronic rock band that formed in 1998 in Syracuse, NY. They later moved to New York City. Although influenced more by new romantic and Britpop music, Soviet was one of several Electropop artists who surfaced in the late 1990s that popularized the sound New York promoter and DJ Larry Tee coined as electroclash. The longest standing core member lineup consists of vocalist and songwriter Keith Ruggiero, and keyboardists Christopher Otchy, Amanda Lynn Berkowitz, and Greg Kochan.

== History ==
=== Formation (1995-1999) ===
The band began in 1995 while Keith Ruggierio attended Syracuse University as a film student. Having long been fascinated with the electronic new wave sound made popular by groups like Orchestral Manoeuvres in the Dark, Ultravox, and early Depeche Mode, he set out to make music in this vein. It was difficult for him to find a band with similar interests, and so he began writing songs and recording on a Tascam 4-track tape machine with a few analog synthesizers he was able to acquire cheaply. He began to create demos, which he circulated to several friends.

A mutual friend gave a demo to Christopher Otchy, who was also attending Syracuse University, and the two began to talk about forming a band. Ruggiero then recruited Adam Hughes and Ian Scheller on synthesizers and drums respectively, and the band began practicing. They began to play at parties and rock venues throughout the area, notably the Starlight Ballroom, Styleens, Planet 505, Shrine Student Center, and the Senior block party where immediately after they performed a riot erupted.

The demos recorded at this time were collected into a rough debut album, <C>.

The name Soviet was derived from Ruggiero's fondness for old Russian filmmakers such as Eisenstein, Pudovkin, and Vertov who he became familiar with in his film studies. Ruggiero saw a similarity between the way these Soviet filmmakers edited film and the way he constructed his own electronic music, cutting up sounds, building a library, and then using them to tell his own musical story.

=== Early Success (2000-2001) ===
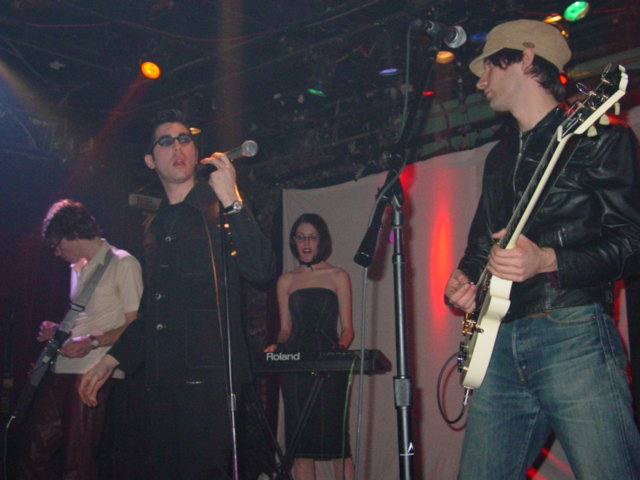
Soviet performing in January, 2002.

After graduating from Syracuse, the band began playing shows in New York City and met some success there. Being an electronic act with a full band, they were versatile enough to play both traditional rock venues and dance clubs.

Soviet entered talks with several potential producers and labels to help record, release and distribute their first album. Among those they spoke with were Shadow Morton and Larry Tee, but an agreement could not be reached. Regarding being courted by major labels, Ruggiero would say, "I want people to share our vision rather than tell us what our vision is.”

In the end, the band self-produced in a studio built by Ruggiero himself in Shelton, Connecticut. It was in this studio that he refined his sound, amassed more synthesizers, and recorded Soviet's first official release, We are Eyes, We are Builders.

The album name was taken from the Russian filmmaker, Dziga Vertov, whose theory of the kino eye influenced Ruggiero whilst in film school. In Ruggiero's words, “it’s the act of observation which leads to a new vision on creation whether it be through art, music, painting, etc.”

In 2001, the California imprint, Plastiq Musiq agreed to release the album. The album was released in the UK the following year by Mogul Electro.

When Plastiq Musiq went bankrupt in 2002, We are Eyes was re-released in the US by Mogul Electro with a different album art, a different track order, and the addition of guitar on a number of the tracks by Kenan Gunduz.

=== Touring (2000-2002) ===
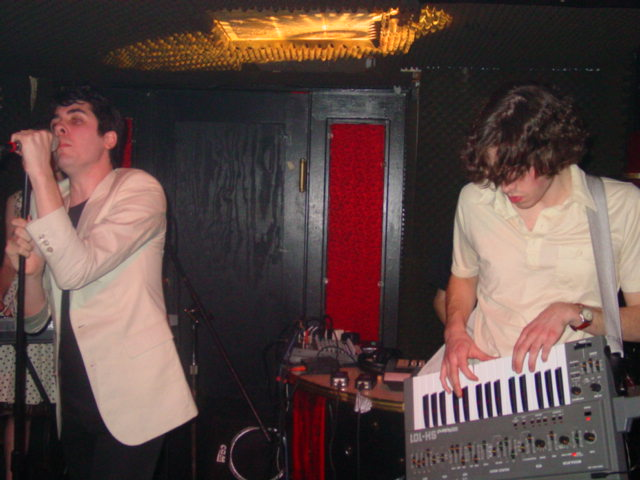
The band Soviet performing in Boston, April 7, 2002.

Soviet became quite well known for their live shows, as they performed electronic music in the same way a rock band did—i.e., most of the parts were performed live as opposed to using all pre-recorded or pre-programmed sounds. This style of performing gained them a following.

The band went on several nationwide tours, performing with acts such as Add N to X, Stereo Total, The Killers, Fischerspooner, Peaches, The Faint, Adult. and the Yeah Yeah Yeahs. In August 2003, they held a residency at Spaceland in Los Angeles.

Between tours the band began to record what would become their second studio album, Spies in the House of Love.

=== Los Angeles (2003) ===
After touring the US and Canada for 2 years, the strain of being on the road wore on the band. The Electroclash movement was slowing as the most popular bands, such as Fischerspooner and Ladytron struggled with waning audience interest.

The band began to lose momentum, and Ruggiero wished to take the music and his career in new directions. In late 2003, he moved to Los Angeles to find work as a commercial composer and sound designer.

In L.A., Ruggiero finished the Spies album under the guidance of seasoned producer and The Pulsars band member, Dave Trumfio, who also mixed the album.

The album was released under Ruggiero's label, Soundsred in 2004.

=== Post-Soviet (2003-2014) ===
Ruggiero's first solo output was a series of soundtracks entitled Moving Pictures. It was released in 2005.

It was also during this time that Ruggiero met director Trevin Matcek, with whom he found a shared taste of music and film.(12) Ruggiero agreed to score Matcek's sci-fi film, "Life Begins At Rewirement."

About the soundtrack composed by Ruggiero, Matcek remarked, "The result is synthetic, but never artificial. It's warm and earnest, with a layer of loneliness just below the surface. Keith summed up the feeling it creates with a single word: chills."

Ruggiero also scored Bot and Dolly's motion projection epic BOX, Ken Block's Gymkhana series 4-7, and a short film entitled The Chamber for the Vimeo/Samsung connected series.

=== Reunion and Ghosts (2015- present) ===
While working on the Life Begins at Rewirement film, Ruggiero was inspired to create a new album of music under the Soviet name. He recorded the Ghosts album in Los Angeles 2014–2015. The album was also produced by Dave Trumfio and was released by Rosso Corsa recordings.

== Musical Style and Influences ==
Soviet has used and continues to incorporate many analog synthesizers to create their music. Ruggiero was initially inspired to use them as they featured prominently in the music of his idols. Once he started using them, he realized the instruments had “endless possibilities.”

Ruggiero has admitted to being influenced by multiple artists and producers, including Steve Lillywhite, Brian Eno, John Leckie, Stephin Street, Hugh Jones, and Kraftwerk.

Their style has been described as "smooth and curvy pop songs," "combining the straight-ahead synth sound of Depeche Mode with the hooks of Disintegration-era Cure."

Ruggiero's vocal and lyrical style has been described as "earnest in melody and lyrics... Ruggiero obviously knows his way vocally around a song."

== Band members ==
=== Current members ===
- Keith Ruggiero - vocals, keyboards, guitar
- Christopher Otchy - keyboards, guitar
- Chaz Windus - keyboards

=== Former members ===
- Amanda Lynn Berkowitz - keyboards
- Kenan Gunduz - guitars, backing vocals
- Ian Scheller - drums
- Greg Kochan - keyboards
- Adam Hughes - keyboards
- Christian Serramalera - drums

== Discography ==
- We Are Eyes, We Are Builders (Plastiq Musiq, 2001)
- Spies in the House of Love (Sounds Red Records, 2004)
- Life Begins at Rewirement (Sounds Red, 2012)
- Ghosts (Sounds Red, 2015)
