= Unelectric =

Studio album by Joy Electric
- Released: June 2000
- Recorded: The Electric Joy Toy Company, 2000
- Genre: Unplugged Synthpop/Electropop
- Length: 36:59
- Label: BEC Recordings
- Producer: Ronnie Martin

Joy Electric chronology
Christiansongs (1999)	Unelectric (2000)	The White Songbook (2001)

Professional ratings
Review scores
Source	Rating
Allmusic	2.5/5 stars
The Phantom Tollbooth	2.5/5 stars

Unelectric is an unplugged album by Joy Electric. It mainly features acoustic versions of Joy Electric songs from previous albums, with the exception of "These Should Be The Good Times" and "Losing Touch With Everyone" which were new songs recorded only for Unelectric.

== Track listing ==
1. "Monosynth" – 4:37
2. "True Harmony" – 2:34
3. "Disco for a Ride" – 4:43
4. "These Should Be the Good Times" – 3:59
5. "The Girl From Rosewood Lane" – 2:59
6. "The North Sea" – 4:28
7. "Sugar Rush" – 3:13
8. "The Cobbler" – 4:22
9. "Candy Cane Carriage" – 3:55
10. "Losing Touch with Everyone" – 2:09
