= The Ministry of Archers =

Studio album by Joy Electric
- Released: August 30, 2005
- Recorded: 2004–2005
- Studio: The Electric Joy Toy Company
- Genre: Synthpop
- Length: 32:01
- Labels: Tooth & Nail; Somewherecold; Republic of Texas
- Producer: Ronnie Martin

Joy Electric chronology
Workmanship (2005)	The Ministry of Archers (2005)	Montgolfier and the Romantic Balloons (2005)

Professional ratings
Review scores
Source	Rating
The Phantom Tollbooth	4/5 stars
Jesus Freak Hideout	3.5/5 stars
Punk News	3/5 stars

The Ministry of Archers is the tenth studio album by American Christian synthpop band Joy Electric. It was released on compact disc by Tooth & Nail Records on August 30, 2005. A 12" colored vinyl version was co-released through Republic of Texas Recordings and Somewherecold Records in October 2005, which includes two bonus tracks. The album is the fourth release in the five-part "Legacy" series. The Moog Voyager synthesizer was used for the creation of all sounds.

== Track listing ==
All tracks are written by Ronnie Martin.

No.	Title	Length
1.	"A Family of Archers"	1:16
2.	"The Ministry of Archers"	3:25
3.	"Most Terrible Archer"	3:21
4.	"Become as Murderers"	3:20
5.	"A Hatchet, A Hatchet"	3:27
6.	"Hornets Horns"	3:21
7.	"Quite Quieter than Spiders"	3:07
8.	"Rickety Trickery"	3:25
9.	"In Intricacies"	2:15
10.	"Can You Refrain"	5:04

Vinyl-only Bonus Tracks
No.	Title	Length
11.	"Bears in Hibernation"	3:27
12.	"Octuplet Down"	3:21
Total length:		38:49
