= The Magic of Christmas (Joy Electric album) =

Studio album by Joy Electric
- Released: October 21, 2003
- Recorded: The Electric Joy Toy Company, 2003
- Genres: rock; Christmas
- Length: 22:06
- Label: Tooth & Nail Records
- Producer: Ronnie Martin

Joy Electric chronology
The Tick Tock Companion (2003)	The Magic of Christmas (2003)	Hello, Mannequin (2004)

The Magic of Christmas is an album by Joy Electric. It was released as a digital-only album in October 2003, by Tooth and Nail Records.

== Release ==
The Magic of Christmas was released on October 21, 2003, by Tooth and Nail Records, available only as a digital download. The album's release was promoted in CMJ New Music Monthly. The album is Joy Electric's first holiday record. Nine of the ten songs are covers of Christmas classics, while "Lollipop Parade" is an original composition. "Winter Wonderland" and "Lollipop Parade" had been featured on previous albums.

== Critical reception ==
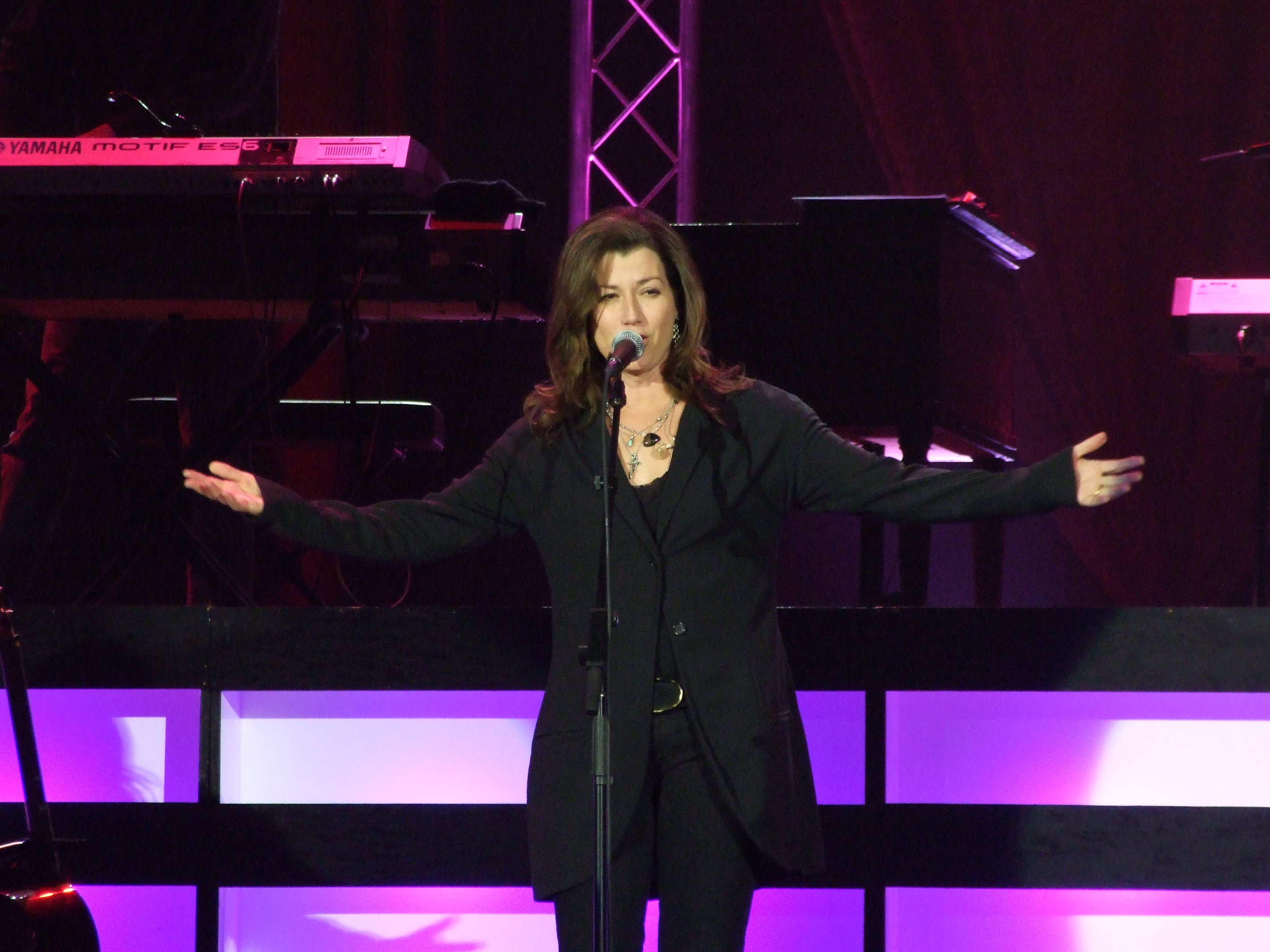
Music journalist Matt Modrich felt that the album was one of the best holiday albums since A Christmas Album,, by Amy Grant (above)

Trae Cadenhead, writing for The Phantom Tollbooth, awarded the album a score of 2 out of 5, and felt that "most of the album's songs are tolerable," highlighting "Have Yourself a Merry Little Christmas," "Holly Jolly Christmas," and "Frosty the Snowman" as standouts, but criticized the album's brevity and the fact that two of the songs had been featured on earlier Joy Electric records.

In contrast, Matt Modrich, also writing for The Phantom Tollbooth, awarded the album a score of 3 out of 5; although he questioned the album's focus on secular songs and likewise criticized the album's short length, he concluded that the album is "a synth-pop delight that may be the thing since Amy Grant's A Christmas Album."

== Track listing ==
1. "Angels We Have Heard on High" (1:48)
2. "Deck the Halls" (1:43)
3. "Have Yourself A Merry Christmas" (2:11)
4. "Winter Wonderland" (2:20)
5. "Holly Jolly Christmas" (2:42)
6. "Lollipop Parade (On Christmas Morn')" (3:08)
7. "Frosty the Snowman" (2:16)
8. "Let It Snow" (2:25)
9. "What Child Is This?" (2:22)
10. "Here We Come A Wassailing" (1:11)

== Credits ==
Adapted from Tooth and Nail's website.

- Ronnie Martin — vocals, synthesizers
