= Space Mountain (Disneyland) =

Indoor space-themed roller coaster

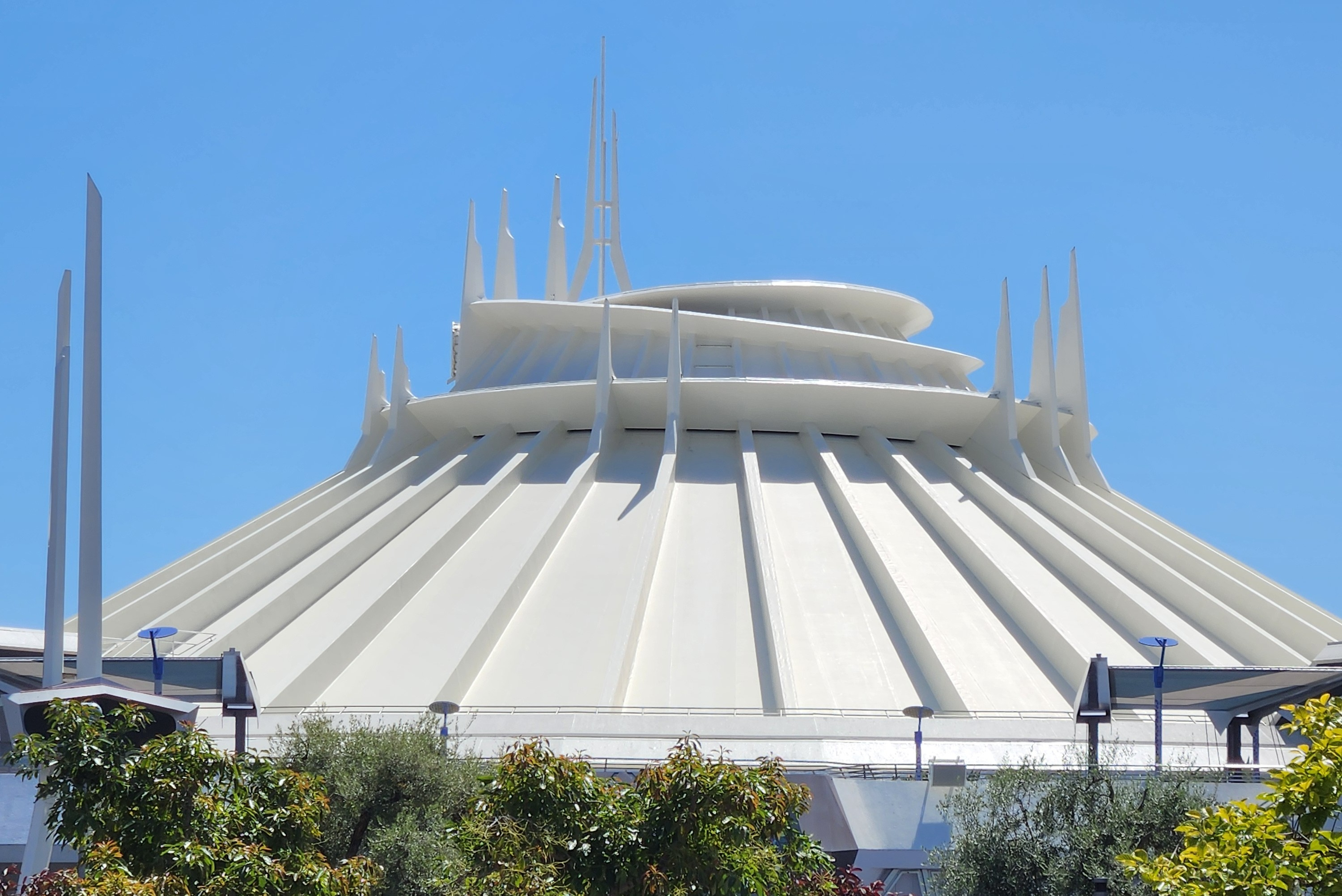
- Exterior of the attraction

Disneyland
- Location: Disneyland
- Park section: Tomorrowland
- Coordinates: 33.811°N 117.9174°W
- Status: Operating
- Opening date: May 27, 1977
- Cost: US$20 million

General statistics
- Type: Steel – Enclosed
- Designer: WED Enterprises
- Lift/launch system: Chain Lift Hill
- Height: 76 ft (23 m)
- Length: 3,459 ft (1,054 m)
- Speed: 32 mph (51 km/h)
- Inversions: 0
- Duration: 2:45
- Capacity: 1,800 persons at max (11 rockets) riders per hour
- Height restriction: 40 in (102 cm)
- Trains: 11 trains with 2 cars; riders arranged 2 across in 3 rows for a total of 12 riders per train
- Sponsors: FedEx (1995-2003)
- Music: Michael Giacchino (2005–present); Dick Dale (1995–2003)
- Manufacturer: WED Enterprises (1977–2003); Dynamic Structures (2005–present)
- Lightning Lane Available
- Must transfer from wheelchair
- Space Mountain at RCDB

"Space Station 77" as depicted in the ride's queue

Space Mountain is an indoor, space-themed roller coaster in Tomorrowland at Disneyland in Anaheim, California. Opened on May 27, 1977, it was the second roller coaster built at Disneyland, and was the second of the five versions of Space Mountain built by The Walt Disney Company. Its exterior façade is one of Disneyland's three "mountain" structures that serve as park landmarks.

Walt Disney originally conceived the idea of a space-themed roller coaster for Disneyland following the success of the Matterhorn Bobsleds, which opened in 1959. However, a number of factors including lack of available space, Walt Disney's death, and the Disney company's focus on building what would become Walt Disney World led to the project's postponement in the late 1960s. After the early success of the Magic Kingdom park at Walt Disney World, Disney revived the Space Mountain project and opened the first Space Mountain at the Magic Kingdom in 1975. Soon after, Disney began plans to build a smaller version of Space Mountain at Disneyland, and opened Disneyland's Space Mountain in 1977. The design of Disneyland's Space Mountain was replicated at Tokyo Disneyland in 1983 and Hong Kong Disneyland in 2005; the Tokyo version was significantly changed in 2006 to become more similar to the refurbished 2009 Magic Kingdom version.

Space Mountain has undergone a number of major upgrades and refurbishments over the years, including the addition of an onboard soundtrack in 1996, repainting of the exterior in 1997 and 2003, and a complete replacement of the original track and ride vehicles from 2003 to 2005. It has also been given a third roof up the mountain during late 2013 and early 2014. Every September and October during Halloween Time at Disneyland, starting in 2009 and ending in 2019, the dome was given projections for the Ghost Galaxy event. On November 16, 2015, Space Mountain was given a new overlay and theme in anticipation for Star Wars: The Force Awakens and redubbed "Hyperspace Mountain." Since then, the attraction has switched between the original and "Hyperspace Mountain" Star Wars theme several times.

== History ==
=== Concept and Walt Disney World version ===
The early success of the Matterhorn Bobsleds – opened in 1959 – convinced Walt Disney that thrill rides did have a place in Disneyland. In 1964, Walt Disney first approached designer John Hench with an idea for an indoor dark roller coaster. The roller coaster's design evolved over the next couple of years, and the name "Space Mountain" was first used for the concept in June 1966. The design was later deemed impossible due to technological limitations as well as the limited space available at Disneyland. Walt Disney's death in December 1966 as well as the company's focus on the Disney World project led the company to shelve the Space Mountain project.

Like Disneyland, Magic Kingdom also lacked thrill rides at the time of its opening in 1971. However, the park became unexpectedly popular with teenagers and young adults and, as a result, Disney began plans to add thrill rides there as well. Designers determined that Magic Kingdom's Fantasyland lacked the necessary space to replicate Disneyland's Matterhorn, but noted a large amount of space available in Tomorrowland. This, coupled with advances in technology since the project was shelved, led Disney to revive the Space Mountain project. The original Space Mountain opened at Magic Kingdom in 1975, and its early success led Disney to revisit the idea of building Space Mountain at Disneyland. Disneyland's Space Mountain was designed by Bill Watkins of Walt Disney Imagineering, including a tubular steel track design awarded U.S. patent 4,029,019. Because of space limitations, the dual-track layout of Magic Kingdom's Space Mountain was not replicated at Disneyland, and a much smaller building was constructed.

=== Opening and early years ===
The second Space Mountain opened in 1977, invigorating a decade-old Tomorrowland as Disneyland's second roller coaster. The $20 million complex opened May 27 including the roller coaster, 1,100-seat Space Stage, 670-seat Space Place restaurant, and the Starcade video arcade.

Six of the original seven Mercury astronauts attended Space Mountain's opening – Scott Carpenter, Gordon Cooper, Sen. John Glenn, Wally Schirra, Alan Shepard, and Deke Slayton. The lone exception was Gus Grissom, who had died along with two other astronauts in a tragic launchpad fire ten years earlier. Largely due in part to the opening of Space Mountain, the Memorial Day day attendance record was set, with 185,500 guests over the three-day period.

The attraction continued operating without much change: sponsors would come and go, and various minor changes, including the addition of a Goodyear "Speed Ramp" (moving sidewalk) in the entrance, happened without fanfare. In 1995, FedEx became the official sponsor for the ride, sparking a number of significant alterations. The queue area was revamped with television monitors looping safety videos, the loading station had a new Audio-Animatronic robot FedEx worker, and other scenic areas were modeled to include FedEx trademarks.

=== Onboard Music Track ===
In 1995, two Imagineers, composer Aarin Richard and Concept Development VP, Eddie Sotto, teamed up to create an onboard music track for the roller coaster. The creative vision was to fuse two iconic musical forms of the 1960s – sci-fi horror music and surf music – into a synchronized soundtrack experience. The first half of the ride's music was original score by Richard, composed in a sci-fi horror movie style, which began as the rockets left the station. After the vehicles crested the top hill, a surf-style adaptation of "Le Carnival Des Animaux: Aquarium" (The Carnival of the Animals), written by Camille Saint-Saëns was triggered as gravity pulled the vehicles downward through the curves and drops. As the rockets reentered the loading station, the score transitioned to a soft synthesized rendition of the Aquarium theme to concluded the experience.

Preliminary testing and compositional work was done through the early months of 1995. In July, the production moved into Studio A at the Imagineering facilities in Glendale, Ca. Numerous midi-sequenced synthesizers parts were transferred to a digital 32 track recorder to establish the structure for live drums, guitars and other parts to be added. Veteran Los Angeles session guitarist, Carl Verheyen, was hired to add the guitar melody and sweeteners to the track. Nearing completion, guest artist Dick Dale was hired to play his iconic guitar riffs on the Aquarium section of the music, also recorded at the Imagineering studio. Dale’s guitar contributions were then interspersed with Verheyen's work. For the final mix, the vehicle's custom speakers developed by Imagineering’s R & D department were brought into the studio. Sam Buckner was the in-house recording and mix engineer with Greg Lhotka assisting.

The downhill portion of the ride was gravity driven with speed variations up to 30 seconds due to the changes in track temperature and the guest load. To keep the music in sync, the music was broken into several sections, each with a musical sustain at its end to accommodate slower vehicle speeds. When the lead vehicle passed a specific point, the next section of music was triggered, creating a seamless soundtrack that could be variable in length. The ride reopened with music in November, 1995.

In 2005 the original music track was replaced with a new score by composer, Michael Giacchino.

=== Renovations ===
In 1997, the exterior of the structure was painted in a green, gold, copper, and bronze, to match the recent facelift to Tomorrowland, and the Goodyear Speed Ramp was removed, but the main ride itself was unchanged (Space Mountain's changes were rather minor compared to other changes made in the 1997–1998 facelift).

Space Mountain closed suddenly on April 10, 2003, with an announcement that it would remain closed until Disneyland's 50th anniversary. Behind the scenes, the onboard audio system was making the trains much heavier, which caused the track and supports to become structurally compromised. As a result, the ride had become unstable and needed a complete track replacement. On June 25, 2005, Disneyland surprised its guests by announcing that the reopening of Space Mountain would open early on July 15, instead of the projected November date.

On July 15, 2005 (with "soft openings" starting July 1), only two days before Disneyland's official 50th Anniversary, Space Mountain reopened from a major refurbishment that started in April 2003. The mountain was restored to its original white. A re-opening ceremony was held that day which featured a guest speaker, Neil Armstrong, who received a plaque that read "Presented to Mr. Neil Armstrong for his courage and adventurous spirit that continues to inspire all mankind to reach for the stars". The plaque also features the Disney quote "It's kinda fun to do the impossible". The new Space Mountain featured new rocket sleds, new special effects and a storyline.

The completely rebuilt track is exactly the same layout as originally designed by Walt Disney Imagineer Bill Watkins in 1976. The only original track from the 1977 ride extends from the back end of the station, to the top of third lift, and the storage and spur tracks, as evidenced by the weld marks on these two track sections where the original and new tracks were joined together. The foundation was laid 30 feet deeper, and floor of the mountain was lowered about ten feet to make evacuation procedures easier, making the ride much safer than before. The rockets no longer glow in the dark. Before the major overhaul, Space Mountain's track was manufactured in-house. The new track was manufactured by Dynamic Structures.

In 2015, the ride was given a Star Wars overlay titled Hyperspace Mountain, which has come and gone over the years. Among the changes are that the ride vehicles are now referred to as "reconnaissance vessels", the setting being the planet Jakku from Star Wars: The Force Awakens, and the pre-flight safety video featuring a briefing from Admiral Ackbar.

In December 2017, Space Mountain would receive a new single rider entrance.

In 2018, the regular queue line was extended into the upper level of the former Starcade, featuring a large futuristic space telescope on display amongst the Starcade's original 1977 murals.

On October 27, 2023, the attraction reopened after a nearly two month long refurbishment period with new interior visual effects and projection mapping on the exterior. From July 25 to September 21, 2025, the attraction's show building displayed a short projection show themed to the Fantastic Four, in conjunction with the release of the Marvel Cinematic Universe film The Fantastic Four: First Steps.

== Experience ==
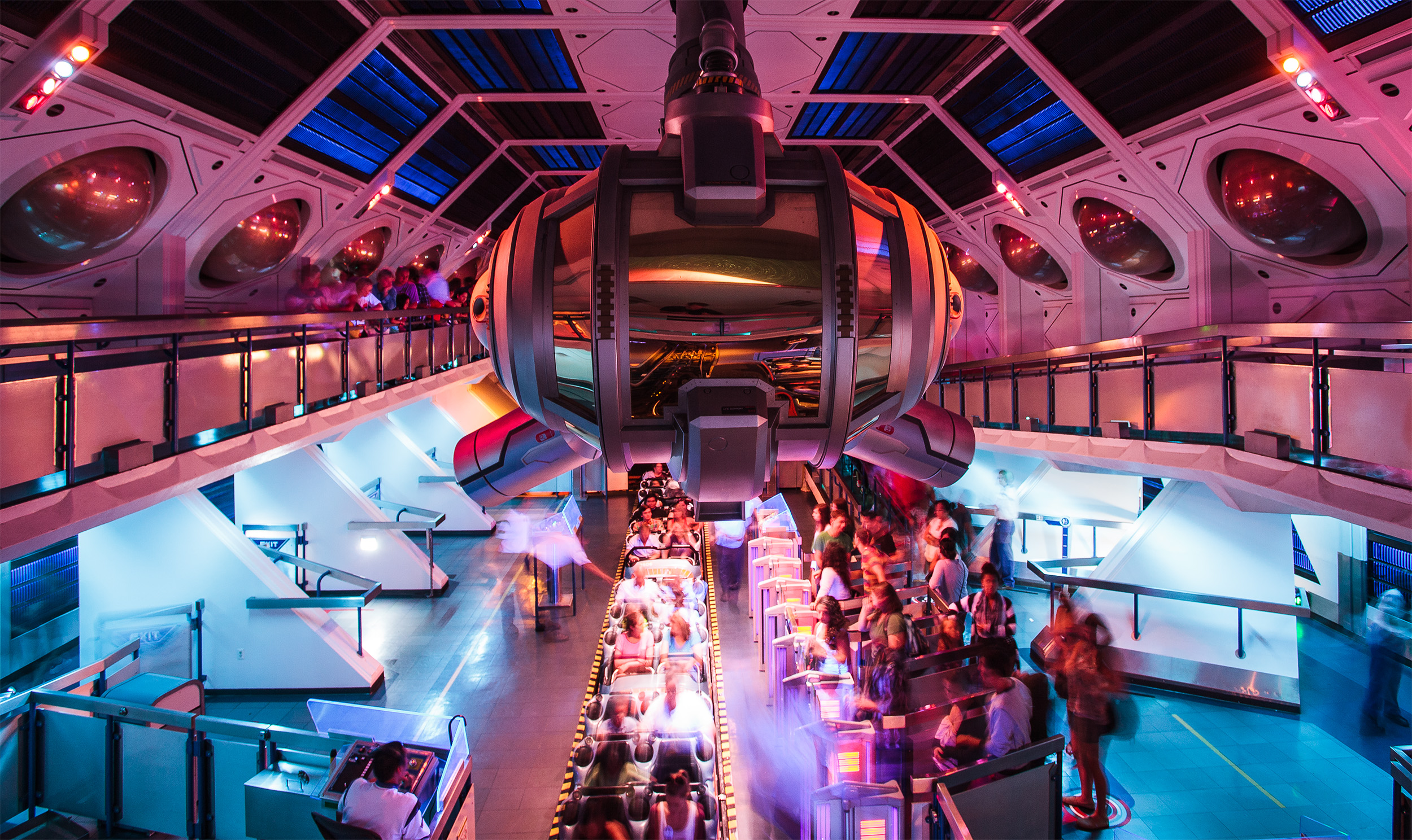
Loading Station

The ride begins in the loading station where guests board the trains. The station is designed to resemble a hangar and contains a full sized starship suspended directly over the load area. The original version of the hangar ship was modeled after the starship from the film 2001: A Space Odyssey. In 2005, the starship was altered to a more science-fantasy design. Once the trains are loaded, they move forward to a holding area, where a lap bar check is made and so the train may wait its turn to start the circuit. When the rocket is released, the red strobe lights surrounding the train flash and it makes a right turn, before climbing the first lift hill. At the top, two strobe lights flash on and the rockets enter a tunnel of flashing blue lights to signify the transfer of power to the trains. Leaving the tunnel, the train then climbs the second lift hill, a long tunnel filled with screens. As the trains begin their climb, red beams stretch along the screens and spin as a galaxy is seen swirling at the very top of the tunnel. As the trains crest the lift, the galaxy swirls up and vanishes. The music climaxes as the trains emerge into the main part of the ride, the inside of the dome. Trains make a U-turn before ascending one more small lift hill. A countdown begins as the vehicles crest the hill and the rockets are sent into a high-speed ride through the dome. The ride consists of many turns and small dips with the illusion of speed given by the fact that the track is barely visible to the riders. The ride approaches the end by plunging in a series of tight right hand turns, gradually picking up speed. With a sudden left turn, the trains enter the re-entry tunnel with many colorful stars flying towards them and two flashes of light as the onride photo is taken. The trains hit the final brake run and make a final right U-turn back into the station.

=== Rockin' Space Mountain ===
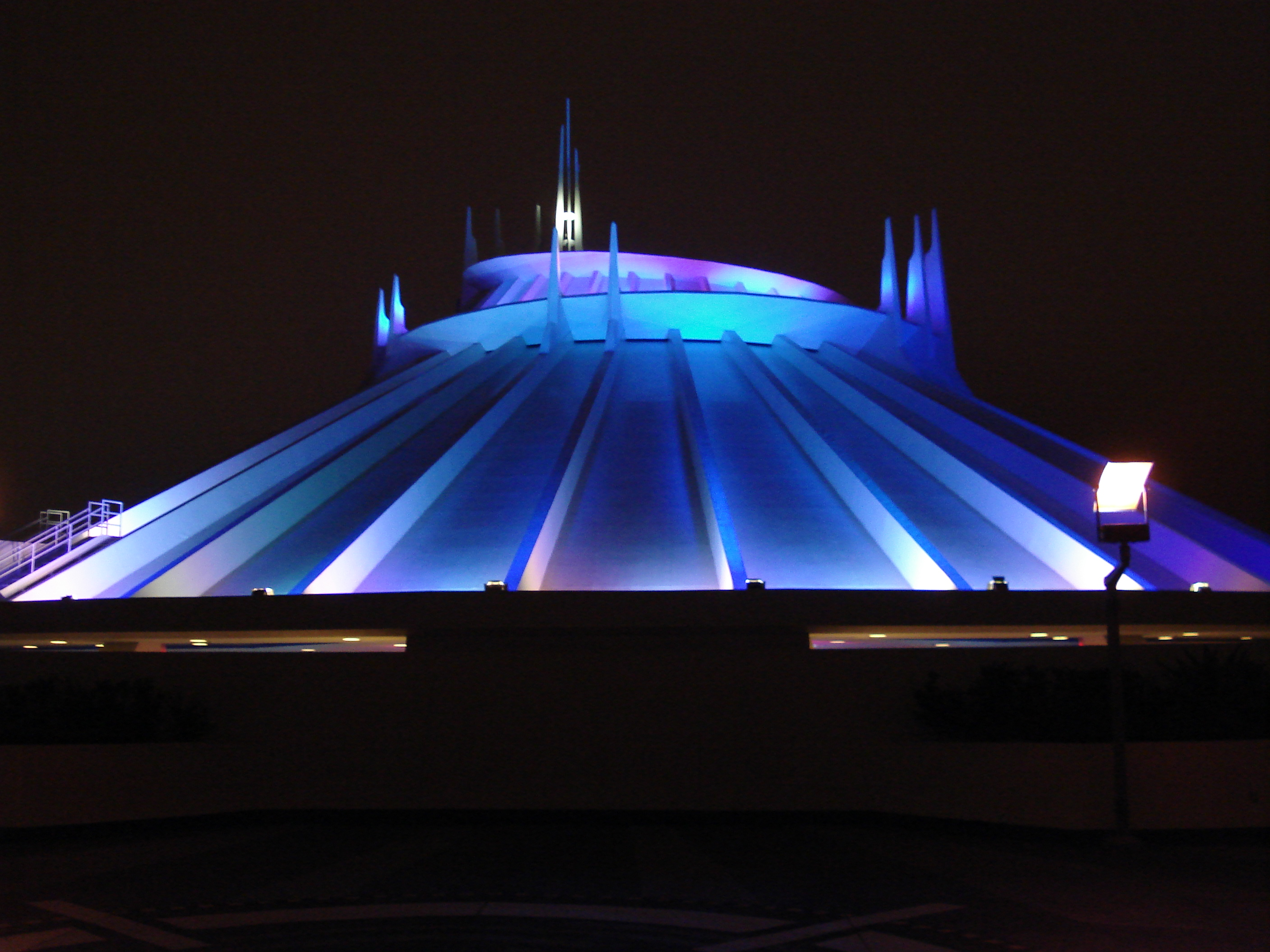
Exterior at night

Also part of this major "new" Space Mountain was a nighttime transformation of the attraction to Rockin' Space Mountain, in which the calmer soundtrack of the attraction in daytime hours was replaced at night with a driving rock soundtrack, and different special effects. The original version of Rockin' Space Mountain, called RockIt Mountain, premiered for Grad Nite 2006 as part of the Happiest Homecoming on Earth.

Rockin' Space Mountain premiered during the "Year of a Million Dreams" Celebration, and was promoted alongside Rockin' California Screamin, a similar modification to Disney California Adventure's California Screamin' roller coaster began January 3, 2007 and ended April 26, 2007. Contrary to the original plans for the attraction to only be "Rockin'" in the evening, "Rockin' Space Mountain" ran during all operating hours of the park. Rockin' Space Mountain did not use the Dick Dale soundtrack. This soundtrack, however, makes one final appearance on Disneyland's 60th Anniversary 3-CD box set.

On December 28, 2006, Disneyland announced that the soundtrack to be featured for "Rockin' Both Parks" were two songs by the Red Hot Chili Peppers. Space Mountain received an edited version of the band's 1989 song "Higher Ground". The song was remixed to "heighten every twist, turn, rise and drop of the attraction." Rockin' Space Mountain's counterpart at Disney's California Adventure, Rockin' California Screamin', used a remixed version of the Red Hot Chili Peppers' "Around the World".

The main differences between the regular and Rockin' Space Mountain include: a different soundtrack, new projections within the mountain, and many lights alongside the track. Riders began their journey with "Uncle" Joe Benson, a radio disc jockey from the Disney-owned 95.5 KLOS, introducing the riders to the "Space Stage" where the Red Hot Chili Peppers would be "broadblasting live." Just like the original, the Star Tunnel was there. The "rocket rockers" continued the flight with a "sound check" with guitar riffs accompanied by projections of bright colors and sound waves. While looking up the second lift hill, the spiral galaxy was no longer in place, but instead riders saw a sun going nova. Finally, once riders crested the lift, the sun would explode. Once on the 180 degree turn next to the asteroid, there was a few seconds of no screaming.

This allowed riders to hear the sound of screaming riders and the soundtrack from other trains in the mountain. The soundtrack then transitioned into the song, "Higher Ground" at the bottom of the third lift hill. During this lift hill, "Uncle" Joe Benson would come back to say "No matter which planet you're from, we're about to rock your world. And it's all gonna happen in 5, 4, 3, 2, rock and roll!" Some of the new special effects included colored strobe lights, projections of dancers and other bright visualizer images.

Many colored lights lined the tracks strobing in sequence and projecting on walls and the surroundings. Re-entry and the station remain mostly unchanged except for some added instruments (drum set, air/electric guitar, etc.) floating in space with the astronaut in the "planet orbit" screen. Another notable change to the station was that the "neon" lights that flash when a rocket train is "launched" to the right remain on and do not shut off, which made the station a tad bit brighter. Also, the front attraction sign included "Rockin'" above "Space Mountain" while a color-changing light illuminated the spire above the sign at night. The design of the on ride photos were changed as well, which included the Rockin' Space Mountain logo, and many musical notes floating in space around riders.

=== Space Mountain Ghost Galaxy ===
In September 2007, Hong Kong Disneyland debuted Space Mountain Ghost Galaxy, a Halloween-themed overlay of the ride that featured new special effects and projections, and centered around a nebula ghost chasing riders throughout the course of the ride. The ride proved to be a massive success among park guests. In September 2009, Disneyland in Anaheim decided to bring the overlay for their Halloween season. The overlay returned in time for Halloween every year until 2018.

The modifications to the attraction were apparent when first encountering the ride building. Several different projections could be seen on the mountain, accompanied by synchronized audio. Six projections played, with several Halloween-themed color schemes appearing between these projection shows:

- The first projection showed the dome becoming a dull grey, the Ghost Nebula would screech as it began making cracks from the inside. Suddenly, the dome seemed to crumble and fall into nothingness. Then, a green grid appeared at the top section of the dome rebuilding it.
- The second projection showed an alien arm resembling that of the nebula ghost running, pushing against the dome from the inside.
- The third projection showed the Nebula ghost slashing at the dome revealing yellow scratch marks.
- The fourth projection showed the ghost releasing lightning bolts that shot up the left side of the dome, then the right, the middle, and finally the entire dome itself accompanied by screeching.
- The fifth projection showed the dome being turned into a bluish-purple radar, with explosions that appeared on the dome, resembling activity of the nebula ghost.
- The sixth (and more rare) projection turned the entire mountain into a space scene, with swirling stars and nebulas projected across the surface. A Big Bang like explosion is put at the end.

Inside the Space station, the planet screen at the front of the station had been changed to reflect the overlay, as well. While viewing the planet, a green "storm" appeared over the planet, causing interruptions to the video feed. Static appeared, then a blue screen, reminiscent of the Windows Blue Screen of Death, saying "LOSS OF SIGNAL...," "SEARCHING..." and "SIGNAL ESTABLISHED".

As guests began their ride, they were met with a more eerie version of the ride's soundtrack. The first lift is changed to have monochrome green lighting, and the subsequent power transfer tunnel is now completely dark. Once ascending the second lift, the nebula ghost comes in view at the top. Near the top of the hill, the ghost spots the rockets, roars, and strikes the riders with lightning. Upon reaching the main ride building and ascending the final lift, the ghost appeared one more time, which marked its chase after park guests. Throughout the ride's layout, guests would catch glimpses of the ghost attempting to capture them. At the re-entry tunnel, the ride flashed with distinctly greenish lights, similar to the first lift. As guests entered their final turn towards the station, the nebula ghost's face appeared one last time, which caught unsuspecting guests off guard.

Ghost Galaxy was not the first Halloween-themed overlay for Space Mountain at Disneyland. Before Ghost Galaxy, in 2007, a Halloween-themed overlay of the ride debuted for cast members known as Space Mountain Nightmare Nebula. Unlike the elaborate retheming of Ghost Galaxy, Nightmare Nebula was limited to simple decorations and a pitch-black ride experience. After poor reception, the overlay did not return the following year in 2008.

=== Hyperspace Mountain ===
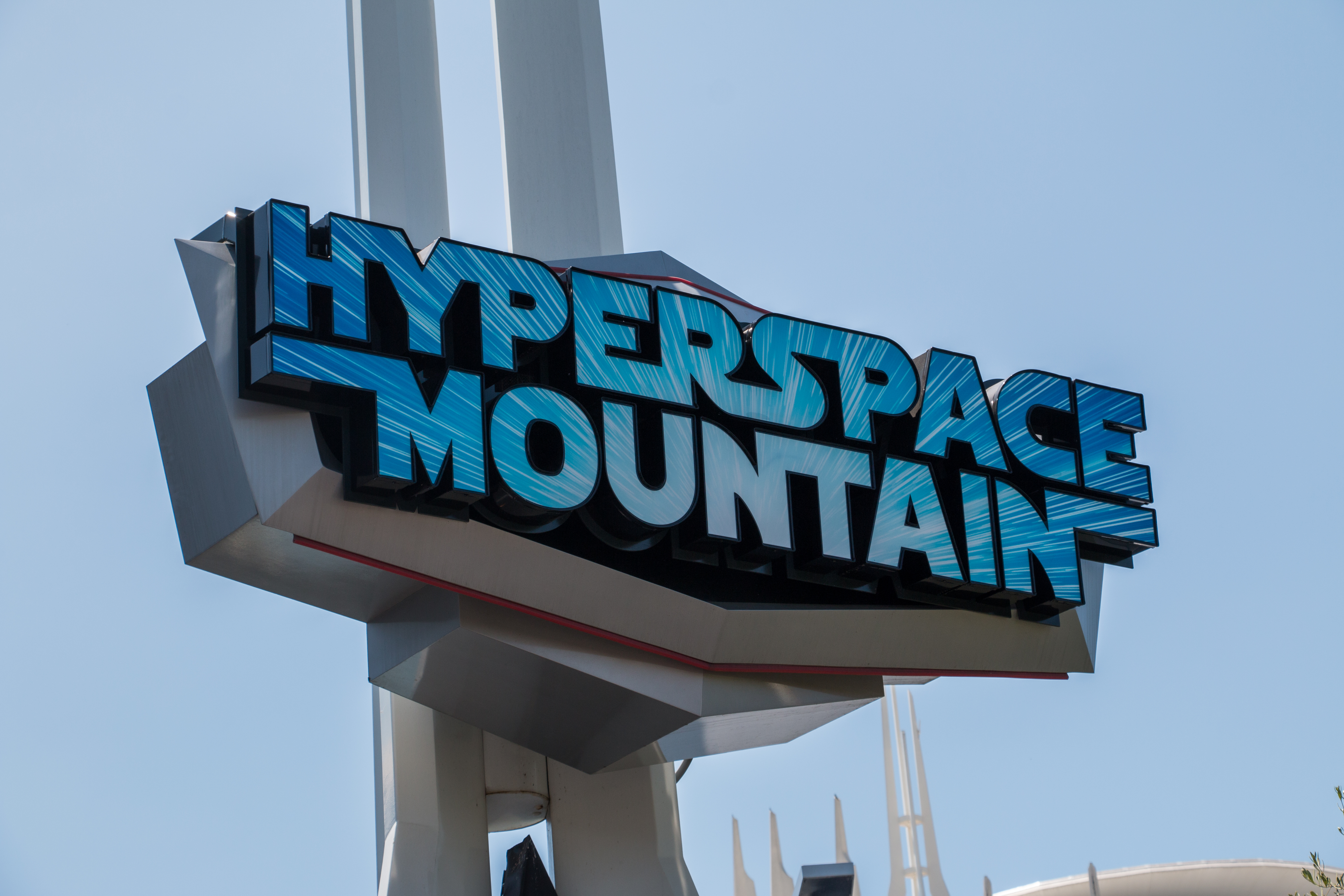
The sign for Hyperspace Mountain in 2016

On November 16, 2015, a Star Wars-themed overlay known as Hyperspace Mountain debuted as part of "Season of the Force"—an event celebrating the release of Star Wars: The Force Awakens. The overlay featured a soundtrack with selections from John Williams's score of the Star Wars films, with projections depicting a mission towards the planet Jakku (a site introduced during The Force Awakens) to investigate the presence of an Imperial-class Star Destroyer as commanded by Admiral Ackbar (voiced by Tom Kane), flying through a hyperspace jump and battling with X-wings and TIE fighters. The overlay was temporarily removed on September 6, 2016, for the Ghost Galaxy overlay. Hyperspace Mountain was brought back the following November then was removed again on June 1, 2017.

Its most recent return engagements in 2018, 2019, and 2022 have been to celebrate "May the Fourth" and Disneyland's After Dark Event Series "Star Wars Nite", since the overlay of Hyperspace Mountain is temporarily closed on January 6, 2020, before the park was temporarily closed on March 12, 2020, due to the COVID-19 pandemic. The 2019 return engagement saw an updated Hyperspace Mountain, which featured more projected scenes, lasers, and other effects. This updated Hyperspace Mountain returned for its 2022 engagement.

In April 2024, it was announced that the updated version of Hyperspace Mountain ride would return until June 2, 2024, as part of "Season of the Force". In December 2024, it was announced that the overlay of Hyperspace Mountain ride would return from March 28 until May 11, 2025 as part of "Season of the Force". On December 2, 2025, it was announced that the overlay of the ride will return from April 28 until June 1, 2026, as part of Season of the Force and Disneyland's 70th anniversary celebration.

Hyperspace Mountain Engagements

- November 16, 2015 – September 6, 2016
- November 1, 2016 – June 1, 2017
- May 4 – June 3, 2018
- May 4, 2019 – January 6, 2020
- April 30 – July 4, 2022
- May 1 – June 4, 2023
- April 5 – June 2, 2024
- March 28 – May 11, 2025
- April 28 – June 1, 2026

== Accessibility information ==
The park website lists for guests to transfer from wheelchair or electric convenience vehicle "by themselves or with assistance by members of their party". A maximum of 3 groups can ride at a time or a maximum of 12 people (if three or fewer groups). A track transfer table installed for the 2005 reopening permits positioning of a rocket at the ready platform, enabling unlimited time for accessibility loading and unloading contrary to the time-critical ambulatory-guest load process.

== Incidents ==
On August 14, 1979, a 31-year-old woman became ill after riding Space Mountain. At the unload area, she was unable to exit the vehicle. Although employees told her to stay seated while the vehicle was removed from the track, other ride operators did not realize that her vehicle was supposed to be removed and sent her through the ride a second time. She arrived at the unloading zone semi-conscious. The victim was subsequently taken to Palm Harbor Hospital where she remained in a coma and died one week later. The coroner's report attributed the death to natural causes: a heart tumor had dislodged and entered her brain. A subsequent lawsuit against the park was dismissed.

In 1983, an 18-year-old man from Quartz Hill, California, fell off Space Mountain and was paralyzed from the waist down. A jury verdict found that Disneyland was blameless in the accident. During the trial the jury was taken to the park to ride Space Mountain, and several of the cars were brought into the courtroom to demonstrate how they work.

On August 2, 2000, nine people suffered minor injuries when a wheel on a Space Mountain car became dislodged and the ride's safety control systems caused the train to stop abruptly. This was Space Mountain's first mechanical problem since its opening in 1977.

In April 2013, Disney voluntarily closed Space Mountain, Matterhorn Bobsleds, and Soarin' Over California due to OSHA-related issues so employee safety protocols could be reviewed. Downtime for each attraction differed, with Space Mountain being closed the longest at one month. The safety review stemmed from seven OSHA fines that were initiated from a contractor injury in November 2012, where the worker fell down the outside of the Space Mountain building and broke several bones.

== See also ==
- Incidents at Disneyland Resort § Space Mountain
- List of Disneyland attractions
