= The White Songbook =

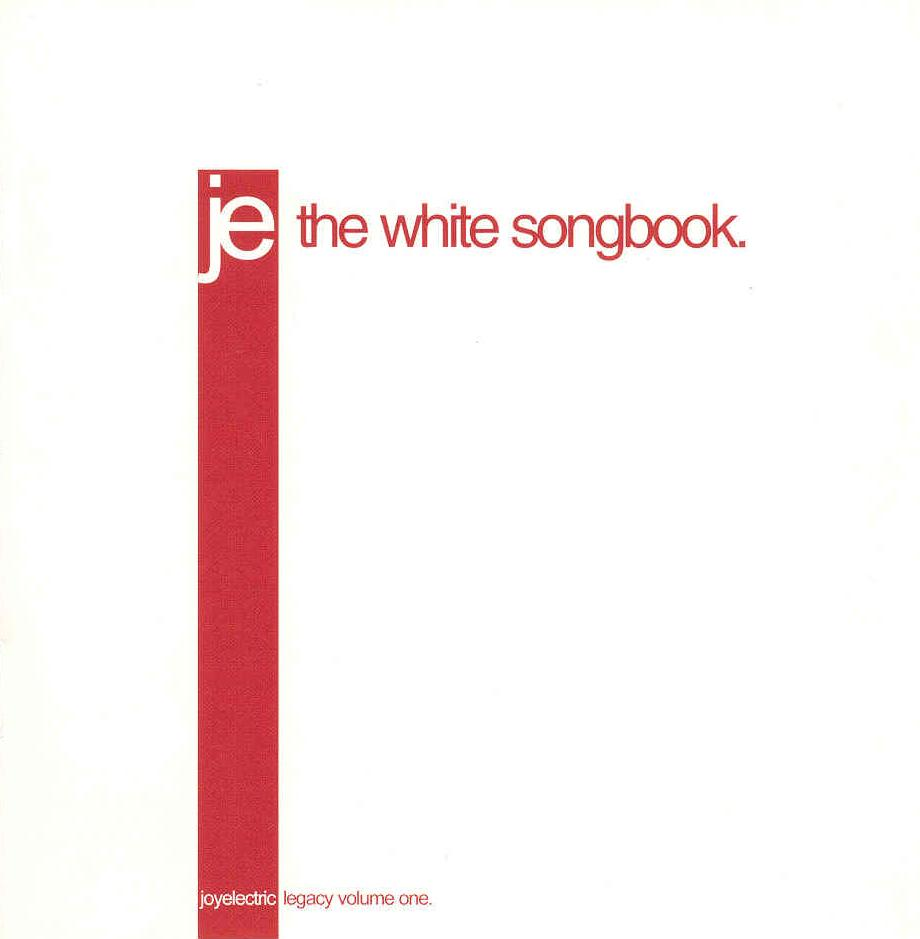

Studio album by Joy Electric
- Released: August 28, 2001
- Recorded: The Electric Joy Toy Company
- Genre: Synthpop/Electropop
- Length: 1:00:41
- Label: BEC Recordings
- Producer: Ronnie Martin

Joy Electric chronology
Unelectric (2000)	The White Songbook (2001)	Starcadia (2002)

Professional ratings
Review scores
Source	Rating
Allmusic	3/5 stars
The Phantom Tollbooth	4.5/5 stars

The White Songbook is the fifth studio album by Joy Electric, and the first in the band's ongoing Legacy series. The album has a "book" theme, with the songs logically divided into "chapters," which are also songs. These chapters are "The White Songbook," "Hunter Green and Other Histories," "As Children We Are Growing Younger," and "A Frog in the Pond." The introductions to these chapters are relatively short instrumentals, with the exception of "The White Songbook," which is much longer and features spoken text.

The White Songbook almost completely leaves the more recognizably "pop" sound of Joy Electric's previous works, both revealing a much more layered and complex sound, as well as a much more progressive musical style with many songs exceeding the five-minute mark.

== Track listing ==
1. "The White Songbook" – 4:15
2. "Shepherds of the Northern Pasture" – 6:12
3. "And Without Help We Perish" – 5:12
4. "The Boy Who Never Forgot" – 3:51
5. "Unicornucopia" – 6:42
6. "Hunter Green and Other Histories" – 1:39
7. "A New Pirate Traditional" – 3:42
8. "We Are Rock" – 3:35
9. "The Good Will Not Be Cloned or Why Should the Christians Get All the Bad Music" – 3:33
10. "As Children We Are Growing Younger" – 1:41
11. "Sing Once for Me" – 6:31
12. "The Heritage Bough" – 6:45
13. "A Frog in the Pond" – 0:27
14. "The Songbook Tells All" – 6:29
