= The Magic of Christmas =

The Magic of Christmas may refer to:

- The Magic of Christmas (Nat King Cole album), 1960
- The Magic of Christmas (Natalie Cole album), 1999
- The Magic of Christmas (Joy Electric album), 2003
- The Magic of Christmas (Marie Osmond album), 2007
- The Magic of Christmas (Samantha Jade album), 2018
- The Magic of Christmas (Celtic Woman album), 2019
- The Magic of Christmas, a 2013 album by Jim Brickman

== See also ==
- Christmas Magic (disambiguation)
