= Plastiq Musiq =

American independent record label

- Founded: 1997
- Founder: Ronnie Martin
- Genre: Electronic; Analog; Musique concrète
- Country of origin: United States
- Official website: plastiqmusiq.com

Plastiq Musiq is an independent record label which concentrates on melodic electronic music made primarily on analog synthesizers.

== About ==
Plastiq Musiq was created by Ronnie Martin of Joy Electric in 1997. It shared a partnership with Tooth and Nail Records from 1998 – 2001. The label was turned over to Mike Williams in 2005. In 2008, Mike Williams turned the label over to Andy Bird of Cut The Red Wire. As of 2013 the label is under the management of Jacob Graham and David Barnhart.

== History ==
=== 1997–2000 ===
PM001 was a collection of songs called Electric Music Compilation 1, with exclusive tracks from Joy Electric, Starflyer 59, Pivot Clowj, and others, it sold out soon after its release. Next was a full length by ex-Mad at the World drummer Randy Rose as Mothership (Mothership had appeared on Electric Music Compilation 1 under the name 'Saturn Project'). It was a dark and brilliant album featuring lo-fi drum loops, beautiful melodies, and original radio broadcast samples from Orson Welles' The War of the Worlds.

In 1998 Plastiq Musiq became a subsidiary of Tooth & Nail records. The first release through this partnership was You Are Obsolete by House of Wires, which was a slightly more accessible incarnation of the Southern California, experimental band Pivot Clowj. There were three more proper releases through this partnership: Goodnight Star's self-titled album, Norway's The Essence of Norway, and House of Wires' second and final album Monogamy.

A fifth album was planned to be released with Tooth & Nail Records, Fine China's When the World Sings, but, due to low sales, the partnership dissolved before its release and Fine China was kept on Tooth & Nail's roster. During this period, Goodnight Star, Norway and Fine China's records were all produced by Ronnie Martin, further establishing the signature sound of the label.

=== 2001–2010 ===
After the split from Tooth & Nail, Plastiq continued to release records independently as it had before. From the glitchy abstract releases of The September Equation, to scoring a minor hit with We are Eyes, We are Builders by New York City band Soviet, who were swept up in the hysteria of an early 00' electroclash scene. It was also during this era that The September Equation's Nathan Schroeder contributed his efforts to solidify the enduring image of the label with his exceptional and minimal album cover designs.

By 2001 a modest scene was nearly taking shape around Plastiq Musiq artists. As most artists shared a common fan base but were scattered across the country, it was decided than an annual get-together was in order and thus The Autobahn Music Festival was born. Most of these daylong events took place in the spring in the small town of Wilmington Ohio. Occasionally a second installment would occur in the autumn. The festival ran consecutively for nearly a decade before it vanished.

In the years that followed, Plastiq Musiq had many releases, most notably from ex-House of Wires frontman Jon Sonnenberg as Travelogue, and a handful of EPs by label founder Ronnie Martin as Joy Electric, including the out-of-print Starcadia.

2005 saw the sale of Plastiq Musiq to Mike Williams who released Above and Underground by Anna Ranger and Be Still Oh Child Of Earth, All Heaven Is In Your Hands by Cut The Red Wire. In 2008 Williams moved to Scotland to continue his education and left Plastiq Musiq in the hands of Andy Bird. Several albums were released under Bird's command, including records by Flashlight Party, Jamie Long, and a collaboration between Jon Sonnenberg of Travelogue and Israel Slick of Red Orchestra called The Prometheus Project.

=== 2013–Present ===
As of 2013 Plastiq Musiq changed management.

== Artists ==
- 20GOTO10
- Anna Ranger
- Britannika
- Cascading Slopes
- Cut The Red Wire
- The Fax
- Flashlight Party
- Goodnight Star
- House Of Wires
- Jamie Long
- Joy Electric
- Mothership
- Norway
- Red Orchestra
- Relic Pop
- Said Fantasy
- The September Equation
- Soviet
- Travelogue
- Winterlisch

== Discography ==
Most Plastiq Musiq releases are electronic pop or synth pop.

Catalogue number	Artist	Title (format)	Year
PM001	Various	Plastiq Musiq – Electric Music Compilation 1 (CD, Comp)	1997
PM002	Mothership	L.P. (CD, Album)	1998
PM003	Britannika	Tales From Her Magesties Ship (CD, Album)	1998
PM004	House of Wires	You Are Obsolete (CD, Album)	1998
PM005	Goodnight Star	Goodnight Star (CD, Album)	1999
PM006	Norway	The Essence Of Norway (CD, Album)	1999
PM007	Various	Plastiq Musiq New Musiq Volume 1 (CD, Comp)	1999
PM008	House of Wires	Monogamy (CD, Album)	1999
PM009	Various	Plastiq Musiq New Musiq Volume 2 (CD, Comp)	2001
PM010	Soviet	We Are Eyes, We Are Builders (CD, Album)	2001
PM011	Norway2	Geometry Not Geography (CD, Album)	2001
PM012	Various	Unheard Artist Compilation Volume 1 (CD, Comp)	2001
PM013	Various	Unheard Artist Compilation Volume 2 (CD, Comp)	2002
PM014	Travelogue	The Art Of Conversation (CD, Album)	2002
PM015	Joy Electric	Starcadia (CD, EP)	2002
PM016	The September Equation	When You Thought You Knew It All… (CD)	2002
PM017	Various	Unheard Artist Compilation Volume 3 (CD, Comp)	2002
PM018	Various	A Plastiq Christmas (CD)	2002
PM019	Various	The Tick Tock Companion (CD, EP)	2003
PM020	The September Equation	Trained Hearts Will Do The Job (CD, Album)	2003
PM021	The Fax	'Electric Life (CD, Album)	2003
PM022	Red Orchestra	Test Tubes, Equations & Creation Simulations (CDr, Album)	2003
PM023	Various	Unheard Artist Compilation Volume 4 (CD, Comp)	2003
PM024	Joy Electric	Friend Of Mannequin (CD, EP)	2004
PM025	Red Orchestra	A Grim Misadventure (CD)	2004
PM026	Travelogue	'Imaginary Hospitals (CD, Album)	2004
PM027	Anna Ranger	Above And Under Ground (CD)	2005
PM028	Travelogue	Telegraph (CD, EP)	2006
PM029	20GOTO10	Elizabeth, Haunted By Ghosts (CD, Album)	2006
PM030	Cut The Red Wire	Be Still Oh Child Of Earth, All Heaven Is In Your Hands (CD, Album)	2006
PM031	Jon Sonnenberg, Israel Slick	'The Prometheus Project (CD, Album)	2008
PM032	Flashlight Party	Wreaths_ (CD, EP, Ltd)	2008
PM033	Jamie Long	The Never Years (CD, EP)	2009
PM034	Cut the Red Wire	Open Your Eyes. It's All Alive (CD, Album)	2010
PM035	Various	New Music Horizons Volume 1 (CD, Comp)	2013
PM036	Cascading Slopes	Towards a Quaker View of Synthesizers (CD/LP, Album)	2013
PM037	Relic Pop	Thick as Thieves (CD, Album)	2014

== See also ==
- List of record labels
