= Joy Electric =

Band

- Origin: California
- Genre: Synth-pop
- Years active: 1994–present
- Labels: Tooth & Nail (1994–Present) w/ various releases on Plastiq Musiq, Somewherecold, Republic of Texas and Velvet Blue
- Members: Ronnie Martin
- Past members: Jeff Cloud; Caleb Mannan; Joshua Graham

Joy Electric is the brand label for a series of electropop/synth-pop productions by Ronnie Martin. Martin began producing music under the Joy Electric name in 1994, after the demise of Dance House Children, a band Ronnie was in with his brother Jason Martin of Starflyer 59. Starflyer 59 bass player and Velvet Blue Music owner Jeff Cloud joined Joy Electric from 1996 until 2002.

Joy Electric disbanded in 2012 when Ronnie Martin entered seminary. Martin has since released music under his own name, saying it was "a chance to start over, to have a blank slate."

== Pre-Joy Electric history ==
Having experimented with live shows, formed countless after-school bands, and recorded an album that was never to be released under the moniker Morella's Forest with Randy Lamb, Ronnie and his brother Jason found their way onto Michael Knott's fledgling label, Blonde Vinyl, with a dance album to produce, Songs and Stories.

After buying an old Akai sampler and a few synthesizers, Ronnie began crafting his own spin-off of current electronic "club" music. Still working with his brother Jason, Ronnie's new band, Dance House Children, posited cold, hypnotic electronica against quaint, old-fashioned lyrics. After producing another album, Jesus, Dance House Children found Jason leaving to pursue his own musical endeavors, Starflyer 59.

With the help of a few friends, Ronnie turned from the club-oriented music to a more melodic, orchestrated sound. A large range of instruments were used on his third album, containing timpanis, Moog synthesizers, and far more exotic sounds than anything he had previously produced. It was evident that Martin was quickly moving beyond the level of pre-programmed keyboard sounds as he became more well-versed in the programming of his synthesizers. Rainbow Rider: Beautiful Dazzling Music No. 1, the name of his third album, formed the bridge between Martin's "techno"-like early days and his enigmatic Joy Electric creation.

== Melody and Five Stars for Failure ==
During the process of writing his fourth album — originally intended as Beautiful Dazzling Music No. 2, then Fairy Tale Melodies (some Tooth and Nail promotional material came out with this name), and then later to be renamed simply as Melody — Martin found the sound of his project changing radically. Of course, changes were quite evident during Beautiful Dazzling Music, but this fourth album carried things to the extreme. Analog synths began to dominate the studio floor-space. Furthermore, Martin began perfecting a clock-like musical technique that had a strange assortment of blips and whirls constantly rotating in the background. The fourth album resulted in several things: a new band name (Joy Electric), his signing with a new label (Tooth & Nail Records), and the launching of Martin's signature sound which he carries to this day. Musical influences included Orchestral Manoeuvres in the Dark, Depeche Mode and New Order.

== We Are the Music Makers and Old Wives Tales ==
By this time, Martin became increasingly fascinated with the idea of musical "purism". Finding inspiration in '70s electronic bands that were "purists" out of necessity (having nothing but simple analog synthesizers with which to assemble an entire collage of blurpy sounds), Martin delegated nearly his entire studio to the closet and vowed to build an album up, brick by brick, from the sounds of just one master synthesizer. Under this constraint he went to work — designing, programming, and storing all his sounds for the new album in a Roland JD-990.

Putting all his eggs in one basket (or synthesizer in this case) left Martin particularly vulnerable to one perennial problem: his synthesizer's storage memory got wiped clean. It's uncertain how this happened, but halfway through the new album Martin found that all his work had been lost. Martin had to begin again from scratch. Taking this opportunity to reconsider his approach, he decided to move into an even more purist direction than before, determined to create a cohesive synthesizer concept album with a medieval, Tolkienesque feel. Since the first half-completed album is no longer in existence, it is impossible to gauge just how radical a change this was from Martin's original effort.

We Are the Music Makers includes Arthurian songs of dim castles, assemblies of knights riding out to battle, dedications to monarchy, and crumbling recollections of Christendom. This Medieval theme was unusual subject matter for a mid-'90s electronic album.

Of all his albums, Martin consistently cites this as his least favorite. (On top of feeling burnt out from the amount of work he put into the album, he came to feel in retrospect that the albums' more experimental sound concealed a somewhat subpar group of songs, in terms of hooks and melodies). Some find the album shows Martin's inexperience at this new "purist" model. However, other fans claim that this album contains some of Martin's most memorable and emblematic work, including "Burgundy Years," "Hansel (I Will Be Your Friend)," and "I Beam, You Beam".

Martin quickly followed this album with yet another EP, this one titled Old Wives Tales. While retaining the Black Forest fairy-tale theme, he dropped the darker, gothic strains and produced a set of songs mixing pop and nostalgia. Joy Electric, in some way or another, has always been an escapist band, leading the listener into a sort of musical land largely unfamiliar and isolated. Old Wives Tales stands as the high-point of that escapism, and proved to be just what fans were looking for. Audiences began to grow, the EP sold in greater numbers, and favorable articles appeared in all sorts of music magazines.

== Robot Rock and Christiansongs ==
Riding this building wave of popularity, Joy Electric began commanding greater respect both abroad and at home. This attention at Tooth & Nail was especially critical, leading to a series of albums that were designed to, and indeed succeeded in, garnering some degree of commercial success. Music videos were made and became more widely distributed. The music moved out of cult circles and picked up new fans in rapid numbers.

Robot Rock was the first album to capitalize on this. The album moved away from the world of "bedroom production" and into professional studio hands. The vocals came across as polished and well-groomed. Having practiced on his analog synthesizers for years, Martin commanded better control of his synthesizers' sounds. To showcase these growing skills, the songs were generally more sparse. The entire album harked back, more than any other release, to his groundbreaking work in Melody.

Following his pattern, Martin released an EP as well, titled The Land of Misfits, containing "Monosynth", two remixes of songs from Robot Rock, a remix of "The Cobbler" from Old Wives Tales EP and one new song. It was generally considered a disappointment by fans, containing only one new song along with reworkings of songs from Robot Rock.

Eventually another EP materialized, the Children of the Lord maxi single. While still including covers on the EP, Martin this time brought some greater variety to the release. Two songs covered radically different influences: Punk rockers MxPx and seventies singer Keith Green. The last song was a Cloud2Ground remix of a song from the upcoming album.

In 1999, Christiansongs was released. Concerning the title, Martin explained his frustration over Christian music groups attempting to downplay their religion in hopes for greater commercial success. Having grown up a Christian, Martin had rarely allowed his faith to intrude heavily upon his music. He nevertheless disapproved of statements like "we're Christians but we're not a Christian band". In contrast, and to set the record straight for any fans, Martin's new album title left no doubt concerning the matter.

Christiansongs contained some of Joy Electric's most overt references to Christianity, exhorting believers to remain strong ("Lift Up Your Hearts"), singing musical prayers of religious dedication ("Make My Life a Prayer", which was a cover of a song written by Melody Green), and proclaiming general obedience to God ("True Harmony"). But the album contained deep lyrical divides. The religious songs were overwhelmingly religious. The other half of the album was, more or less, the usual Joy Electric fare.

Christiansongs also demonstrated Martin's ability to move beyond bubbly-happy songs that critics condemned for being too shallow. The album showcased a wide range of feelings, spanning to familiar exuberant territory all the way into new, darker directions.

== The Legacy Series ==
2001 saw the release of Legacy Volume 1: The White Songbook. A year and a half in the making, The White Songbook continued in the synthesized tradition of the past few albums by using nothing but a Roland System 100, but with many intricate and interwoven layers of sounds building on each other. The music was divided into four thematic chapters, and the very sparse artwork of the album was meant to invoke the sense of an old book. This album also brought the relatively successful single "We Are Rock." In spite of a level of critical success, Ronnie was miserable during the album's long and tedious production. The companion EP to this album is Starcadia, which has since gone out of print and become a much sought after collectible.

The Legacy series continued with The Tick Tock Treasury, whose sparseness was a musical reaction to the thick and lush nature of The White Songbook. Instead of including lyrics in the booklet, Ronnie opted to include a short story which served as inspiration for the title of the album. As opposed to The White Songbook, The Tick Tock Treasury's placement in the Legacy series was found only in a small and passing liner note in the CD insert. The companion EP to this album is The Tick Tock Companion, a long-running set of experimental synthesizer music recorded in one take.

The third Legacy album was Hello, Mannequin. Like its predecessor, its place in the Legacy series was only shown by a small liner note. This album brought a significantly more rigid structure to the songs, with basslines sometimes not changing for the duration of an entire track. The companion EP, Friend of Mannequin, contains remixes, several new songs, and a three-part interview.

The Ministry of Archers, identified as a Legacy album only by the mark "lv4" (for Legacy Volume 4) in the liner notes, was also the first to be produced in the newly renovated Electric Joy Toy Company on Ronnie's new Moog synthesizer equipment. The new synthesizer brought a significant change in sound, though the album bears some resemblance to previous Legacy works. Namely, it is broken into chapters like The White Songbook and its lyrics are not printed in the sleeve, like The Tick Tock Treasury. The companion EP, Montgolfier and the Romantic Balloons, is split into two sections: an eponymous mini concept album, and a collection of remixes and extra tracks called "Other Archers." The Ministry of Archers was released on compact disc by Tooth & Nail Records on August 30, 2005, and on colored 12" vinyl by Republic of Texas Recordings and Somewherecold Records in October 2005.

The Otherly Opus was released on March 20, 2007, as the fifth and final volume in the Legacy series, noted as "Moog Dynasty Years Volume 2". The album includes some of the most intricate vocal work on a Joy Electric album to date. Thematically, the album is split in two-halves. The first half is known as The Otherly Opus, while the second half is The Memory of Alpha, a mini concept album about antediluvian times. The album's companion EP, Their Variables, contains remixes of all songs on The Otherly Opus as well as two new songs. It was released on September 18, 2007.

== Moog Dynasty ==
Continuing on the Moog tradition of the previous two albums, Joy Electric's album My Grandfather, The Cubist was released May 27, 2008. The following year, two EPs were released: Early Cubism is a digital download consisting of demos of three tracks from My Grandfather, The Cubist, while Curiosities and Such contains six new songs.

In 2009, Joy Electric released "Favorites at Play", an album composed of covers of artists such as Coldplay, The Killers, Blink 182 and more.

== Dwarf Mountain Alphabet ==
On March 20, 2012, Joy Electric announced that the new album would be released independently. A Kickstarter campaign was launched to raise $6,000 to fund the project. The goal was reached within nine hours. Dwarf Mountain Alphabet had been previously announced in an interview with Ronnie Martin in fall 2011. The album was released on December 4, 2012.

== Discography ==
=== Albums ===
- Melody (1994)
- We Are the Music Makers (1996)
- Robot Rock (1997)
- CHRISTIANsongs (1999)
- Unelectric (2000)
- The White Songbook (2001)
- The Tick Tock Treasury (2003)
- The Magic of Christmas (2003)
- Hello, Mannequin (2004)
- The Ministry of Archers (2005)
- The Otherly Opus (2007)
- My Grandfather, The Cubist (2008)
- Favorites at Play (2009)
- Dwarf Mountain Alphabet (2012)

=== Compilations ===
- Art Core, Vol. 1 (Tooth & Nail Records, 1995), track 1, "Sorcery"
- Art Core, Vol. 2 (Tooth & Nail Records, 1996), track 3, "Transylvania"
- Happy Christmas (BEC Recordings, 1998), track 2, "Winter Wonderland"
- Moms Like Us Too, Volume 1 (1999), track 3, "Sugar Rush"; track 4, "Girl from Rosewood Lane (Remix)"; track 5, "Electric Car"
- New Musiq, Volume 1 (Plastiq Musiq, 1999), track 12, "Come In, Brother"
- New Musiq, Volume 2 (Plastiq Musiq, 2001), track 18, "Parlor Inventor"
- The Art and Craft of Popular Music (2002)

=== EPs and singles ===
- Five Stars for Failure (EP) (1995)
- Old Wives Tales (EP) (1996)
- The Land of Misfits (EP) (1998)
- Children of the Lord (Single) (1999)
- The White Songbook: Unmixed/ Unmastered songs from the full length album (Single) (2001)
- Starcadia (EP) (2002)
- The Tick Tock Companion (EP) (2003)
- Friend of Mannequin (EP) (2004)
- Workmanship (7") (2005)
- Montgolfier and the Romantic Balloons (EP) (2005)
- Workmanship (CD reissue) (EP) (2007)
- Their Variables (EP) (2007)
- Early Cubism (EP; digital download) (2009)
- Curiosities and Such (EP) (2009)
