= Old Wives Tales (EP) =

EP by Joy Electric
- Released: October 1996
- Recorded: The Electric Joy Toy Company, 1996
- Genre: Synthpop, electropop
- Length: 24:53
- Label: Tooth & Nail Records
- Producer: Ronnie Martin

Joy Electric chronology
We Are the Music Makers (1996)	Old Wives Tales (1996)	Robot Rock (1997)

Professional ratings
Review scores
Source	Rating
Allmusic	3/5 stars

Old Wives Tales is an EP by Joy Electric. Like most of Joy Electric's EPs, Old Wives Tales sports a much more simplistic and minimal style then on the majority of the full-length discs. This is mainly due to Martin having less spare time because of touring and being generally fatigued from the intense recording process as well as an intentional break from the norm into a lighter, more spontaneous style of recording. Along with two remixes of songs from "We Are the Music Makers", this EP contains another version of "Candy Cane Carriage", originally found on "Melody", Joy Electric's first album.

== Track listing ==
1. "The Cobbler" – 3:11
2. "And It Feels Like Old Times" – 3:52
3. "Burgundy Years (Remix)" – 4:19
4. "Old Wives Tales" – 3:04
5. "Marigoldeness" – 2:18
6. "The Golden Age" – 2:05
7. "Candy Cane Carriage (Lost in the Forest)" – 2:17
8. "I Beam, You Beam (Remix)" – 3:47
