= Christmas Magic =

Christmas Magic may refer to:

- Connie Talbot's Christmas Magic, a 2009 album by Connie Talbot
- "Christmas Magic", a 2006 music video by Aliana Lohan
- "Christmas Magic", a remake of the song "Starlight Moonlight" by Secret for the 2011 EP Shy Boy
- Winter Magic (album), released as Christmas Magic in some territories, a 2009 album by Hayley Westenra
- Christmas Magic, a 2014 EP by Cimorelli
- David Nixon's Christmas Magic, a 1974 show by magician David Nixon
- "Christmas Magic" (song), a 2024 song by Laufey
- "Christmas Magic", a 2024 song by Perrie Edwards

== See also ==
- The Magic of Christmas (disambiguation)
