= Robot Rock (album) =

Studio album by Joy Electric
- Released: November 18, 1997
- Recorded: The Electric Joy Toy Company, March–July 1997
- Genre: Synthpop, electropop
- Length: 30:50
- Label: BEC Recordings
- Producer: Michael Knott

Joy Electric chronology
Old Wives Tales (1996)	Robot Rock (1997)	The Land of Misfits (1998)

Professional ratings
Review scores
Source	Rating
AllMusic	4/5 stars
Alternative Press	

Robot Rock is the third full-length album by Joy Electric, released in 1997. It is the group's best-selling album.

== Production ==
The album was recorded solely on analog synthesizers.

== Critical reception ==
The album was reviewed favorably by critics. Heather Phares, writing for AllMusic, designated the album as an "Album Pick" from the group's discography, and praised its simplicity and vocalist Ronnie Martin's vocal performance. Trouser Press wrote that "had the album been released in 1981, songs like 'Sugar Rush' and 'Monosynth' would likely now be beloved new wave classics. Robot Rock is among the best of the neo-new wave albums, and deserves a spot on the shelf next to albums like the Human League’s Dare, Depeche Mode’s Speak and Spell and Soft Cell’s Non-Stop Erotic Cabaret. CMJ New Music Monthly called the album "synth-pop reduced to its [Gary] Numan-ian essence."

== Track listing ==
(all songs written by Ronnie Martin)

1. "Sugar Rush" – 2:23
2. "Monosynth" – 3:19
3. "I'm Your Boy" – 2:59
4. "Joy Electric Land" – 2:53
5. "Storybook Love" – 3:05
6. "The Robot Beat (We're Back)" – 3:24
7. "Forever Is a Place" – 2:23
8. "The Berry Patch" – 2:57
9. "Strawberry Heart" – 3:34
10. "(We Are) Taking Over" – 3:53

== Credits ==
- Ronnie Martin – synthesizer, vocals
- Jeff Cloud – synthesizer
