= The Plot in You =

American metalcore band

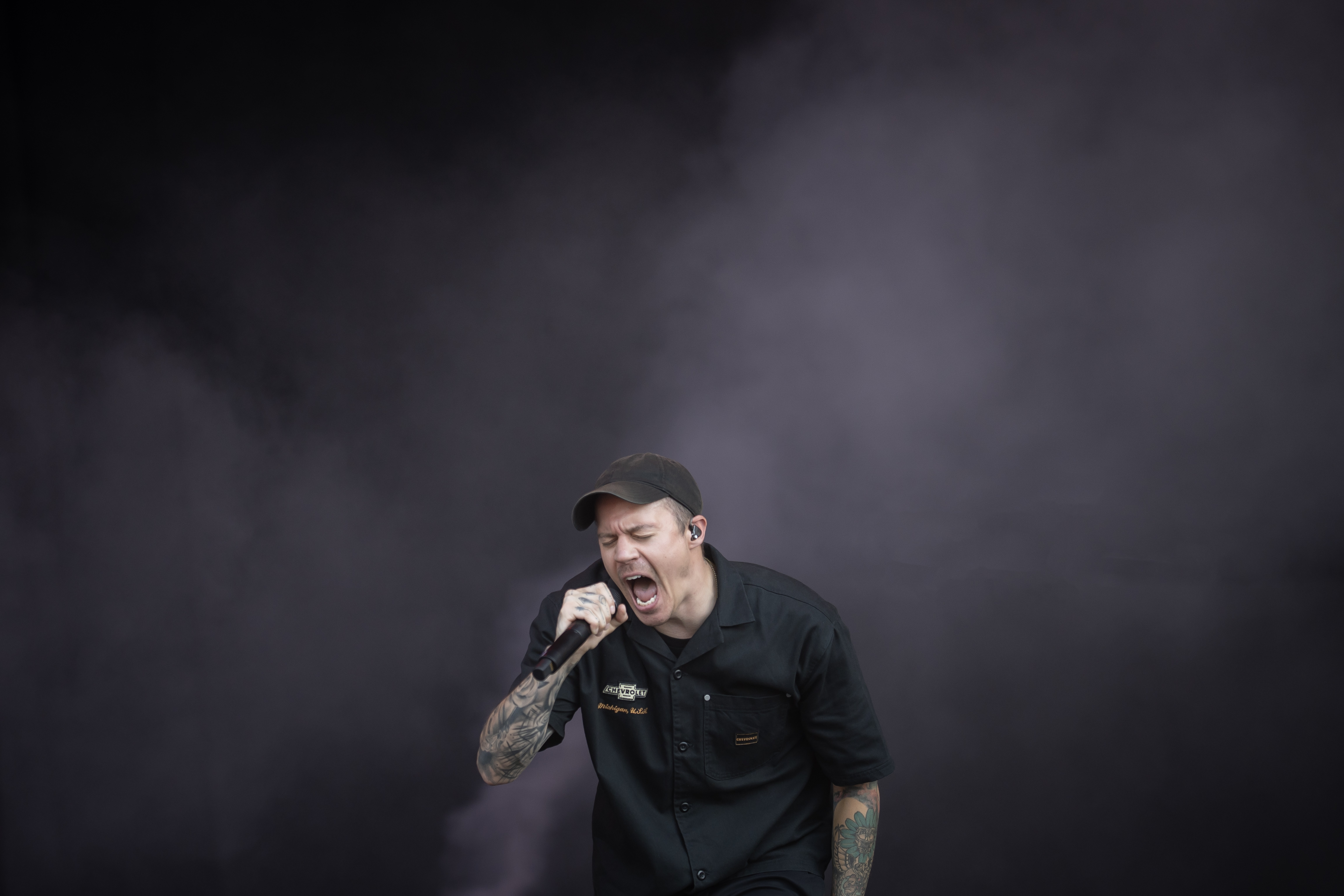
- Landon Tewers, lead singer of The Plot in You, performing in 2026

Background information
- Origin: Hancock County, Ohio, U.S.
- Genres: Metalcore; post-hardcore
- Years active: 2010–present
- Labels: Fearless; StaySick; Rise; InVogue
- Spinoff of: Before Their Eyes
- Members: Landon Tewers; Ethan Yoder; Josh Childress; Michael Cooper
- Past members: Anthony Thoma; Cole Worden; Derrick Sechrist; Kevin Rutherford; Mathis Arnell
- Website: theplotinyou.com

The Plot in You is an American Post-hardcore band formed in Hancock County, Ohio in 2010. Originally a side project of former Before Their Eyes member Landon Tewers, the group is composed of Tewers, guitarist Josh Childress, bassist Ethan Yoder and drummer Michael Cooper.

The Plot in You have released four EPs and five studio albums. Their EP Wife Beater was released in 2010, followed by their debut studio album First Born in 2011, and second studio album Could You Watch Your Children Burn in 2013. In 2015, the band announced their signing with StaySick Recordings, and Happiness in Self Destruction was released the same year. In 2017, they parted ways with StaySick Recordings and signed to Fearless Records while also announcing their fourth studio album Dispose, which was released in 2018. Their fifth studio album, Swan Song, was released in 2021.

== History ==
=== Formation, name change and First Born (2010–2011) ===
Beginning as a side project to guitarist/vocalist Landon Tewers while a part of the post-hardcore band, Before Their Eyes under the name "Vessels". Vessels would go on to release a debut EP recorded and produced by himself titled Wife Beater through InVogue Records the label that Before Their Eyes was also signed to. Shortly after the release of Wife Beater, Tewers saw the potential of Vessels and decided to leave Before Their Eyes. He would then go on to change the band's name "The Plot in You" and recruit guitarists Anthony Thoma and Josh Childress, bassist Ethan Yoder, and drummer Cole Worden for live performances choosing to create the music independently from the rest of the band. Near the end of 2010, the band announced that they had signed to Rise Records and with Tewers admitting that he had already begun working on the material for an album with an expected release for early next year.

On October 21, 2010, the band set out on their first tour as support for A Plea for Purging "The Mosh PotatTour" in December alongside Your Memorial and Within the Ruins. The band would go on to release two promotional singles from their forthcoming new album, "Unwelcome" on November 29 and "Miscarriage" on February 24. The last song the band would go on to release prior to their album would be a cover of Rob Zombie's "Superbeast" which was released on March 30 on the band's Facebook page.

On April 19, 2011, the band official released their debut album, First Born, through Rise Records and would go on to tour extensively throughout 2011 and 2012. At the end of the summer of 2011, the band would begin working on a music video for the song, "Miscarriage" which they would release on September 1. The band would join Thick as Blood, Legend and We Are Defiance on their "Circle of Friends Tour" before embarking on A Bullet for Pretty Boy for their fall "The Revision:Revise Tour" for their album of the same name alongside The Great Commission and The Air I Breathe. The band would finish the year as part of MyChildren MyBride winter headlining tour alongside Within the Ruins, Lionheart and I Declare War.

=== Could You Watch Your Children Burn (2011–2013) ===
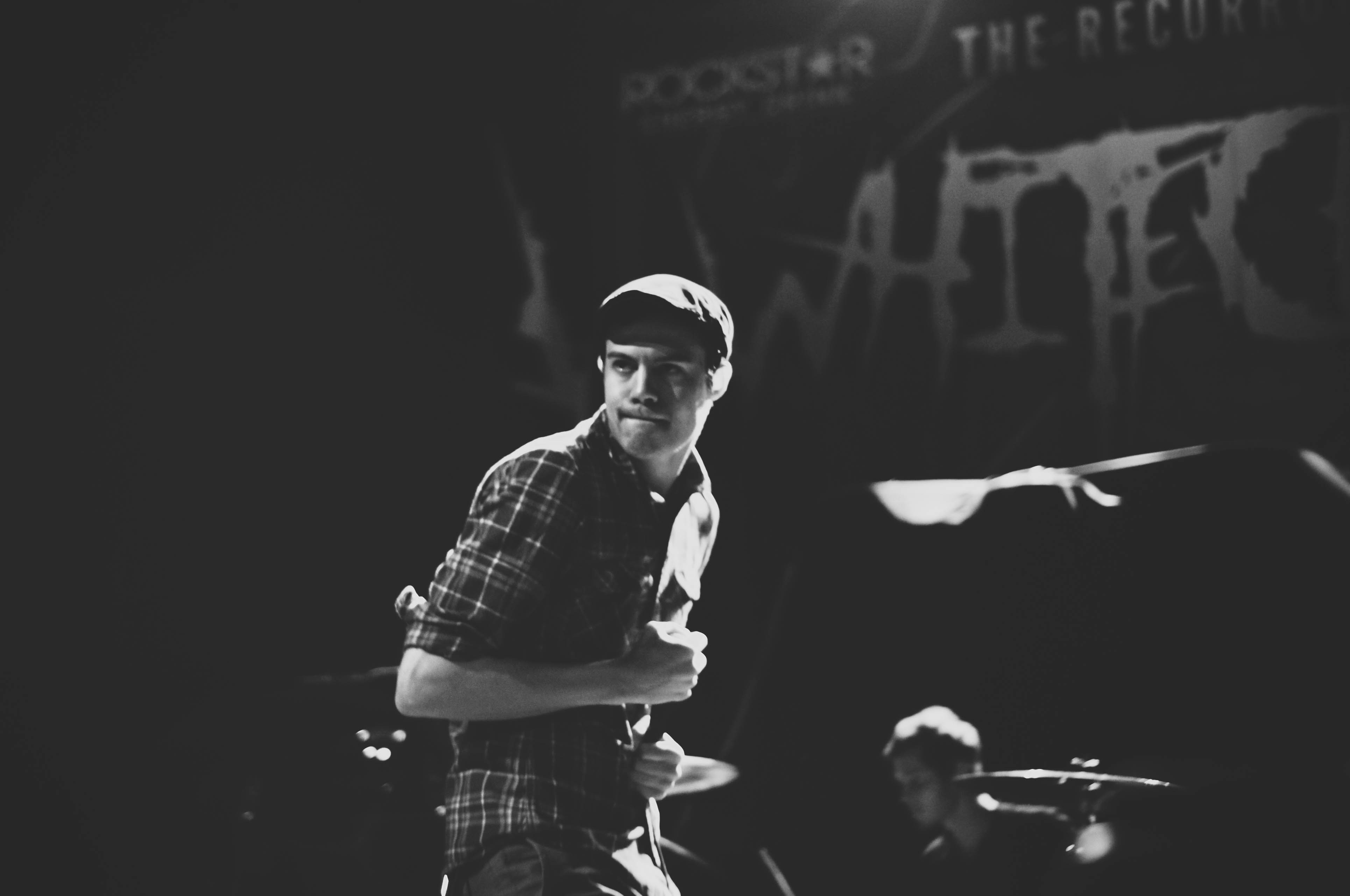
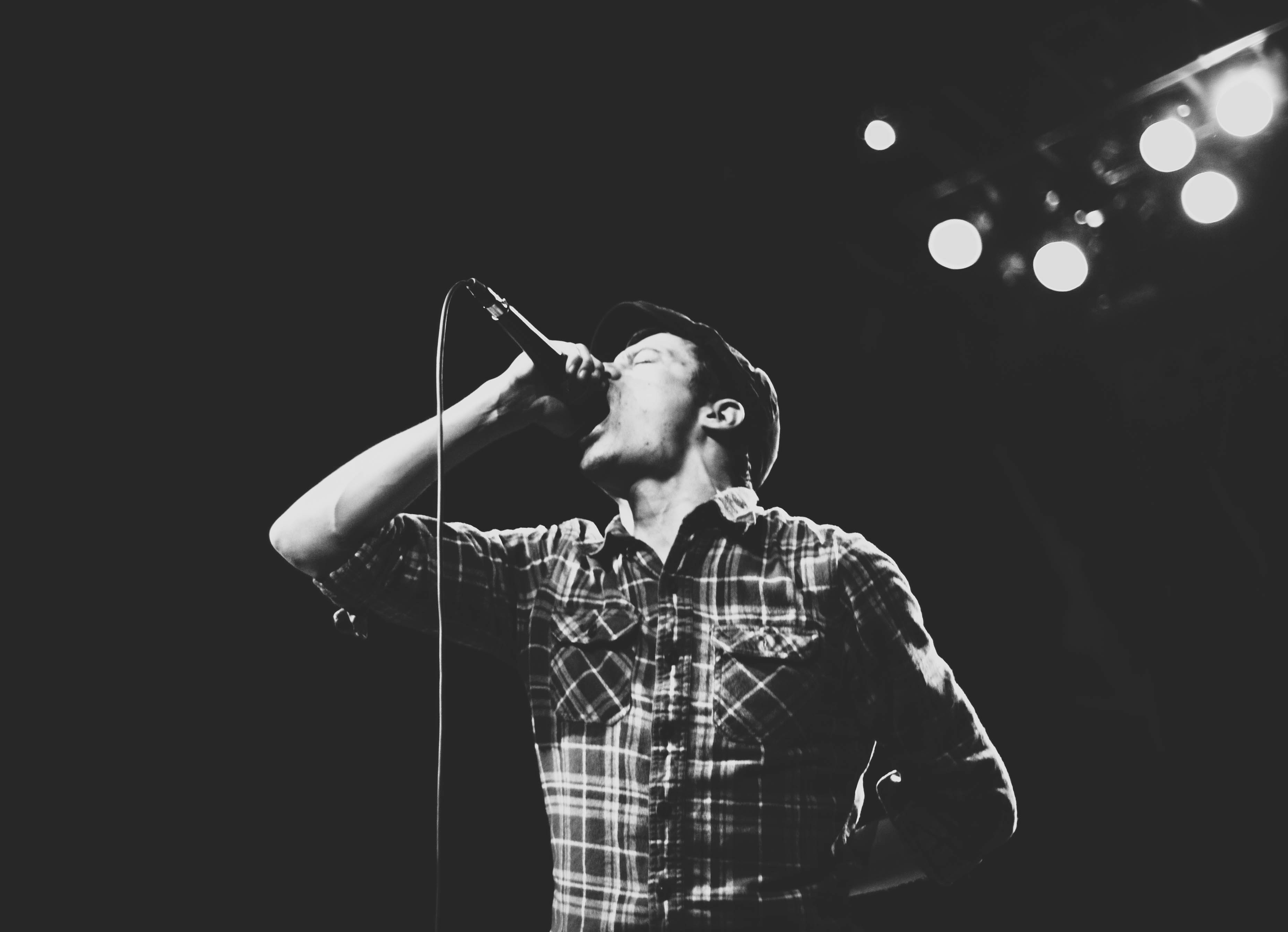
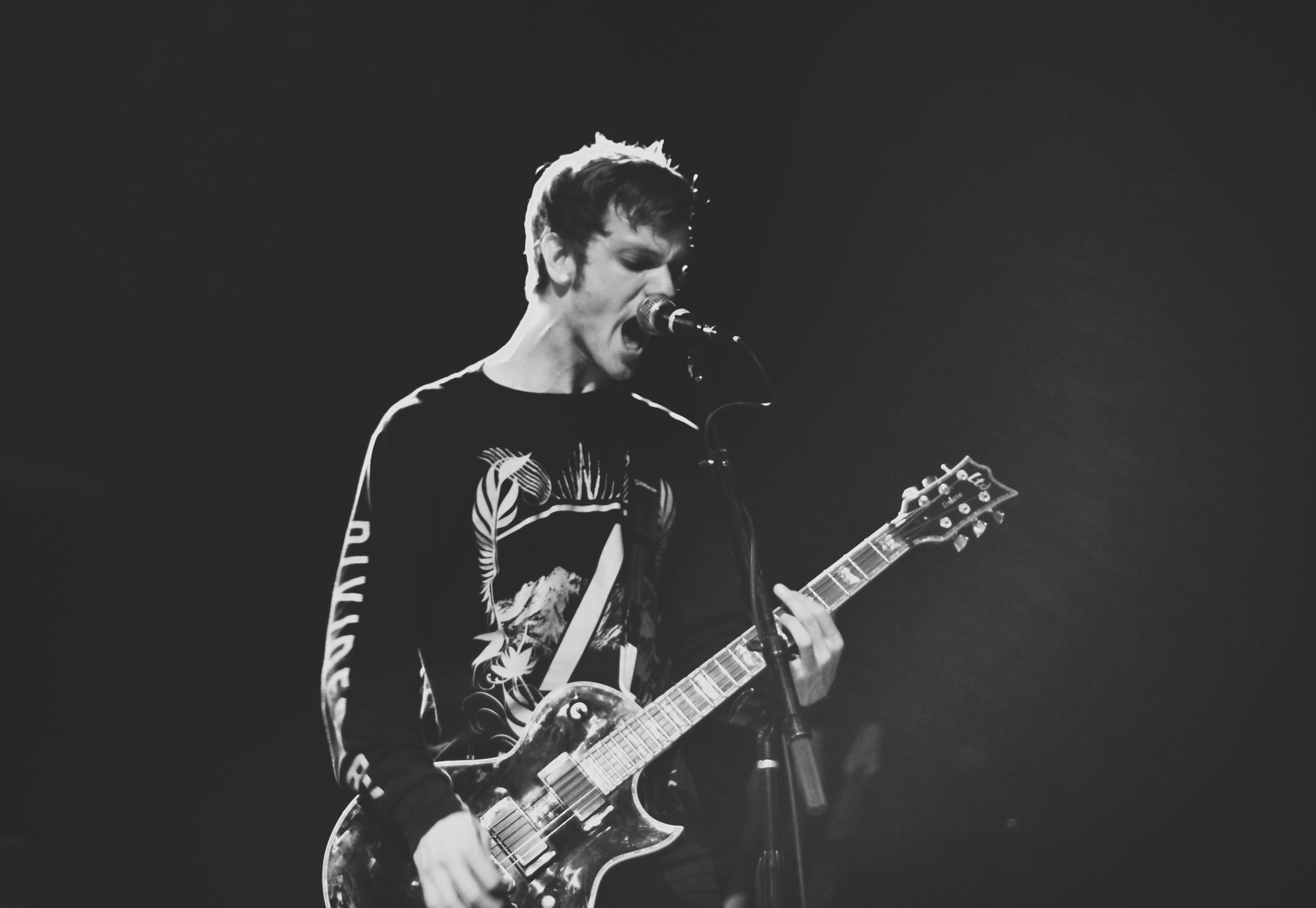
The Plot in You performing in 2012

On October 22, 2011, the band announced on Twitter that they had already begun work on their next release. At the end of December 2011, guitarist Anthony Thoma announced that he would be leaving the band to return to school and had played his last show with the band earlier that month and would be replaced by A Bullet for Pretty Boy's guitarist, Derrick Sechrist. The band would begin the year touring as a part of Whitechapel's "The Recorruptour" alongside fellow supporting acts Miss May I, After the Burial, Structures and Within the Ruins. Soon after the band announced that they would be returning to the studio in March to begin tracking their next album. In the spring it was announced that the band would be embarking on "The Dead Kid Tour" this summer along with My Ticket Home, For All I Am and Erra before joining Demon Hunter's "The True Defiance Tour" alongside Bleeding Through, Cancer Bats and Willows. The band would go on to replace Molotov Solution on Impending Doom's forthcoming July U.S. tour with Within the Ruins, Erra and To Each His Own.

At the end of the summer of 2012, the band announced that they would be releasing their forthcoming album sometime this fall through Rise Records. Shortly after they were confirmed to be a part of Iwrestledabearonce's North American "Ruining Earth for Everybody" headlining tour this fall with Oceano, Vanna, Within the Ruins and Surrounded by Monsters. By the fall, the band announced that they would be ending the year as part of Like Moths to Flames mini-headlining tour in support of the deluxe reissue of When We Don't Exist alongside Ice Nine Kills, Horizons and Assassins. Not too much time later the band began releasing studio footage of them hard at work on their forthcoming album. Following the announcement the band also revealed that their outing titled, Could You Watch Your Children Burn would have a January 15 release date. The band would bring in the new year as part of Whitechapel's and Emmure's co-headlining tour the "Brothers of Brutality Tour" with Unearth and Obey the Brave.

On December 10, the band released their first song from their forthcoming album, the aggressive track, "Premeditated" detailing vocalist Tewers hostility towards the individual that had victimized his girlfriend while on tour. Later that month, the band released the next song from their forthcoming record, the veracious "Fiction Religion". The last song the band would release promotionally before the January 15 release of their sophomore album would be "Digging Your Grave", a track about Of Mice & Men's former vocalist Austin Carlile for an undisclosed reason.

On February 18, 2013, the band would release the NSFW tortured themed music video for their track, "Premeditated". A month later the band were announced to be a part of Attack Attack!'s "Back in Action Tour" the band's first tour since changing up singers and would be supported by Get Scared, Dangerkids and Closer to Closure. A couple days later, the band released a music video for the song, "Fiction Religion". Drummer Cole Worden announced his amicable departure from the band in the summer of 2013 stepping down from the band to pursue steadier employment. Kevin Rutherford formerly of Like Moths to Flames' fame would unofficially take over as the band's new drummer being officially announced sometime later. The band released their final music video from their sophomore effort at the end of summer 2013, releasing the live video for their song, "Troll".

The Plot in You would embark on a summer overseas European and UK tour with direct support from I Declare War along with Empires Fade and Odessa providing split support for the tour. Followed by an Australian tour in September with For the Fallen Dreams, Storm the Sky and Fit for a King. They would end the year touring the US as part of Attila's "About That Life Tour" with Upon a Burning Body and Fit for a King. Later joined by Iwrestledabearonce completed the lineup for Attila's headlining tour.

=== Happiness in Self Destruction (2013–2016) ===
The band were revealed to be heading back into the studio after their fall tour with Attila and Upon a Burning Body to begin work on their next release. The band will also bring in the new year as part of For Today's headlining tour in support of their new album, Fight the Silence through Razor & Tie with support from Stray from the Path, Like Moths to Flames and Fit for a King. The band were revealed to be joining Motionless in White and The Defiled on a tour in March appearing on select dates with For the Fallen Dreams and For Today.

The band would join Chimaira on their summer headlining "The Artery Metal Tour" alongside fellow supporting acts; Upon This Dawning, Allegaeon and Silence the Messenger. Following that tour, the band would then find themselves a part of The Acacia Strain's fall North American tour along with Cane Hill. During those shows the band began playing the song, "Crows" live with the song expected to be featured on their third album.

At the beginning of 2015, the band announced that they would be embarking on a spring tour with Sworn In, I Declare War and Gift Giver. But before joining up with Sworn In and I Declare War the band was a part of a small spring tour with Outline in Color and Gift Giver. Packing in their spring the band were announced to be a part of the "New England Metal & Hardcore Festival" among other heavy metal acts Fit for an Autopsy, I Declare War, Lionheart and Boris the Blade.

On February 23, 2015, the band announced their departure from Rise Records thanking the label for being a tremendous help with their last few releases and that they are finishing up work on the next album and will be announcing a new label soon. Along with the announcement they released a music video for their new song, "My Old Ways" stating the song showcases the sound and feel of their new album. In March, they released the previously unreleased B-side, "Crows", a song they had been playing live at shows and were planning to release on a 7-inch that never came to fruition. On June 3, the band announced that they will be taking part in Like Moths to Flames' summer headlining tour in support of the band's new 7 inch, The Dream Is Dead alongside Myka Relocate, and Yuth Forever (formerly Villains). After their supportive run with Like Moths to Flames, they were announced to be playing a small headlining run of shows with Myka Relocate finishing up the summer.

In July, the band officially announced that they had signed to StaySick Recordings and would be releasing their new album in the fall with Tewers expressing his joy to be working with hard working and passionate people that are also friends they've known on a personal level. They would later announce that their third album, Happiness in Self Destruction, would be released on October 16, 2015 releasing a video detailing the hardships behind the new album. At the end of August, they released, "Take Me Away", the second single from their looming album with Tewers citing the song as the most meaningful songs on the record and a tribute to his late grandfather. In September, they released a music video for "Take Me Away". They released the last promotional single, "Dear Old Friend" from their forthcoming album on October 3. In December 2015, they announced that they would be beginning the year supporting Blessthefall on their headlining tour in February alongside Sirens and Sailors, Miss May I, and A War Within.

On June 28, 2016, they premiered a music video for their song, "Time Changes Everything", taken from the new album Happiness in Self Destruction directed by Mathias Arnell the band's current touring drummer.

=== Dispose (2017–2019) ===
On June 1, 2017, it was announced that they would be part of Fearless Records' newest Punk Goes... compilation album, Punk Goes Pop Vol. 7, along with other top and up-and-coming bands in today's alternative scene covering the biggest Top 40 hits with their own dynamic flair. The band would go on to include their cover of the James Bay song, "Let It Go", with the compilation album being released on July 14.

On June 15, The Plot in You announced that they had signed with Fearless Records stating that they were excited to be a part of the "Fearless family" and that it's refreshing to have a team behind them with the ambition and the tools to bring life to the creative vision they've always had for the band. They celebrated with the signing by releasing the song, "Feel Nothing", a song from their upcoming and first album that Tewers' had worked with another producer. This also served as an announcement of the band's departure from StaySick Recordings. Later that month, they were announced to be a part of The Color Morale's summer headlining tour in support of their 2016 album, Desolate Divine, alongside Dayseeker and Picturesque. They would later announce that they would be joining Ice Nine Kills on their "Every Trick in the Book tour" with the band performing the album of the same name in full each night with support from Dayseeker, Ovtlier and Carousel Kings. On November 16, the band released a music video for the first single from their forthcoming album, "Not Just Breathing" along with the tracklisting and that the album would be released on February 16.

On January 5, 2018, they were announced to be bringing in the new year till spring accompanying We Came as Romans' in their "Cold Like War Tour" alongside Oceans Ate Alaska, Currents and Tempting Fate. On January 25, the band opened up about their upcoming album, Dispose stating that "breakdowns are no longer his main concern, that doesn't mean the band's sound is lightening up" and that the album would be the band's heaviest but not in the way that fans think. Also in January, the band were announced to be joining Polaris and Alpha Wolf on their spring Australian tour. By the end of January they were set up to finish touring the spring in Europe and the UK alongside We Came as Romans, Polaris and Alazka.

Beginning in February, the band would go on to release a music video for their new song, "Disposable Fix" on February 2 and "I Always Wanted to Leave" ironically released on Valentine's Day. The band began streaming their new album a day before its official release with Tewers issuing a statement on the overall style change. Stating: "...when I first started Plot I was a metalhead through and through. After touring with only heavy bands, recording heavy bands, and writing primarily heavy music for years it just became mundane... I simply don't listen to what I listened to eight to 10 years ago. I've gone through things in my earlier days that made sense to scream about, and could be conveyed properly through heavy music. These days that tone just doesn't work for the most part. I've written three and a half records worth of heavy music. I want to expand and challenge myself."

In June 2018, they were announced to be continuing their trek in Europe and the UK this fall alongside The Amity Affliction, Dream State and Endless Heights. By July, they were announced to be finishing up the year touring in support of Underoath's winter North American headlining tour with Dance Gavin Dance and Crown the Empire. The following day, the band released a music video for their emotional song, "The One You Loved".

At the end of January 2019, they were announced to be joining their pals Like Moths to Flames, Dayseeker and Limbs for an upcoming spring North American tour. In May 2019, The Plot in You announced a few headlining shows this summer around their appearance at this years 2019 "Rock USA" festival with an appearance by Ice Nine Kills at their Columbus, Ohio show. At the end of July, they were excited to announce that they would be a part of Sum 41's fall headlining tour with The Amity Affliction with Of Mice & Men appearing on the dates that The Amity Affliction won't. They would go on to play a select few shows on the off-dates from their tour with Sum 41 and The Amity Affliction.

=== Swan Song (2019–2022) ===
On November 5, 2019, Landon announced on Instagram that he is working on new material for the band and his side project Ai640. It wouldn't be until the beginning of April 2020 that Tewers would go on to update the album's progress going on to state that: "...we're a little over half way done tracking the new plot record and I'm really excited to get another record out. The new shit is truly unlike anything we've ever done..". Tewers would also go onto release his melancholy solo track "Say It Ain't So" to tide fans over for the coming album. In May 2021, Tewers officially announced the album is completed.

On July 29, the band officially released the new lead single "Face Me" from their fifth studio album, Swan Song, which was released on September 17, 2021, along with its music video. At the same time, the band revealed the album cover and the track list. To promote the album, the band also announced that they will support Silverstein's rescheduled 20th anniversary tour along with Can't Swim in November 2021. On August 19, the band unveiled the second single "Enemy". On September 9, one week before the album release, the band released the third single "Paradigm" and its corresponding music video.

=== Self-titled sixth album (2022–present) ===
On October 25, 2022, The Plot in You unveiled the first single "Divide". On December 1, the music video for the single was published. On February 8, 2023, the band released the second single "Left Behind" along with an accompanying music video. On August 11, the band unveiled the third single "Forgotten" and along with a music video.

On January 19, 2024, The Plot in You released the single "Closure", following the band's issued digital EP Vol. 1, which met a release on January 12. The EP compiled three previously released singles from the group. In addition, the band also announced its follow-up, Vol. 2, released on May 3, 2024. On March 8, the band premiered the single "Don't Look Away" and its corresponding music video. On November 8, the band released a third installment, Vol. 3, including the singles "Been Here Before" and "Pretend".

== Musical style ==
The band's initial music featured a gritty metalcore sound with low-tuned guitars, a hint of djent, slight melodies but an overall emphasis on dissonance and equally as gritty lyrics. Tewers used a guttural vocal style most typically found in deathcore music with minor use of sung vocals in their earlier music, mirroring their angry and gritty tone to convey his dark lyricism, usually dealing with themes of toxic relationships, drug abuse, and anger. The band would go on to add some melodic elements in their future releases after incorporating the use of clean vocals during their debut album. Their sophomore album would mark a shift to faster, more aggressive music with the incorporation of industrial samples and even full songs with little to no screaming. By their third album the band began to stray away from their metalcore roots leaving the aggression behind in favor of experimentation. By their fourth outing, Dispose, Tewers stated the album would be a different type of heavy with the band leaving breakdowns and the cliches of metalcore behind them for unpredictable songs varying from alternative rock to electronica, with many switching seamlessly from one genre to the next in a matter of seconds. The biggest change came with multi-instrumentalist Landon Tewers including help from the rest of the band in the creative process for Dispose with Tewers writing, recording and producing all of the band's previous releases aside from drums and percussion on some of their older releases. However, with the release of their EPs, Vol.1, Vol.2, and Vol.3, the band returned to their heavier roots, even adding some deathcore influences as well, while keeping a fair bit of their softness.

The Plot in You have cited influences including Underoath, As I Lay Dying, Bring Me the Horizon, Bad Omens, Architects, Spiritbox, Invent Animate, I Prevail, Sleep Token, Polaris, We Came as Romans, Motionless in White, Fit for a King, Babymetal, King 810, Ice Nine Kills, Thrown and Slipknot.

== Band members ==
Current

- Landon Tewers (formerly of Before Their Eyes) – vocals, keyboards, programming (2010–present); guitars (2014–present); drums, percussion (2014–2015)
- Ethan Yoder (formerly of Walking Edith Park) – bass (2010–present)
- Josh Lewis Childress – guitars (2010–present)
- Michael Cooper – drums, percussion (2021–present)

Former

- Anthony Thoma – guitars (2010–2012)
- Cole Worden (formerly of Walking Edith Park) – drums, percussion (2010–2013)
- Derrick Sechrist (formerly of A Bullet for Pretty Boy) – guitars (2012–2014)
- Kevin Rutherford (formerly of Like Moths to Flames and Legion) – drums, percussion (2013–2014)
- Mathis Arnell (formerly of MyChildren MyBride) – drums, percussion (2015–2021)

Touring musicians

- Alex Ballew (Erra) – drums, percussion (2014–2015, 2017)

Timeline

== Other projects ==
- In March 2014, vocalist Landon Tewers announced that he would be releasing a debut solo EP on April 1 describing it as "full of weird songs I can't use for anything else" debuting his first single, "Ma and Pa" along with the announcement. He would go on to stream his EP, entitled Dead Kid on March 31 a day before its intended release and set out on a tour that summer with support from Wind in Sails. After the debut of his solo project, Landon would begin releasing original music and covers infrequently for the following years sometimes under different monikers. On Christmas Eve of 2014, Landon released another solo song with the title, "I Hope You Have a Shitty Christmas", having written the song while drunk and releasing it to tide fans over until the next Plot in You release. Along with revealing that the band have a music video shot, a 7 inch ready to go and that he will be releasing some studio updates soon so that fans will have a taste of what's to come. In February 2015, continuing with appeasing fans with the wait for new Plot in You music Landon released another solo track this time a cover of Drake's "Hold On, We're Going Home" with Dream Pilot's Sean Macdonald providing the guest backup vocals for the track. On the 12, Landon shared another solo track, "I'll Always Be Proud" a song he wrote for his girlfriend when he was "borderline suicidal" which is set to appear on his forthcoming EP. Followed by the song "Feel You Out" three days later.
  - In 2015, Landon revealed another side project this being the chaotic metalcore moniker, "Ai640" which he would be releasing a concept EP full of music that didn't fit with the Plot in You's third album. He released the first song for the project in June 2015, "Debate", beginning a series of releases that would continue the ever-growing story of the sentient robot "Ai640". Landon released the self-titled EP about the titular violent robot with artificial intelligence. Tewers would go on to follow this concept into a second EP with the title "Ai640, Pt. 2" in 2017 along with the supporting single, "Jane". It would not be until the end of 2019 that Tewers would release any more heavy music under the moniker "Ai640". And in 2020, Tewers would finally complete his six-year side project and release the last EP in his conceptual trilogy.
- In 2016, guitarist Josh Childress began releasing his own music first releasing a cover of Leonard Cohen's "Hallelujah" at the beginning of November then debuting his original song, "Always Blue" at the end of November featuring a more atmospheric alternative rock sound with gritty vocals as opposed to the metalcore typically found in The Plot in You's music. He would then go on to premiere his next song, "Bottle of Red" and reveal that he would be releasing an EP titled, Always Blue in December 9. On March 16, 2017, they released his next song, "Sell Your Soul" continuing with the atmospheric alternative rock style with progressive elements thrown in the mix. Two years later in 2019, Childress would release his cover of The Rolling Stones' song "Blinded by Rainbows" and release his second EP, A Little Lost Without You. premiering the promotional singles, "Think." and "Kind Eyes" for the release.

== Discography ==
=== Studio albums ===
List of studio albums, with selected chart positions
Title	Album details	Peak chart positions					
Title	Album details	US	US Hard Rock	US Heat.	US Indie	US Rock	AUS
First Born	Released: April 18, 2011; Label: Rise; Formats: CD, LP, digital download, streaming	—	—	36	—	—	—
Could You Watch Your Children Burn	Released: January 15, 2013; Label: Rise; Formats: CD, LP, digital download, streaming	110	4	1	18	29	—
Happiness in Self Destruction	Released: October 16, 2015; Label: StaySick; Formats: CD, LP, digital download, streaming	102	5	1	12	13	—
Dispose	Released: February 16, 2018; Label: Fearless; Formats: CD, LP, digital download, streaming	133	9	1	—	22	—
Swan Song	Released: September 17, 2021; Label: Fearless; Formats: CD, LP, digital download, streaming	—	—	—	—	—	—
The Plot in You	Released: July 10, 2026; Label: Fearless; Formats: CD, LP, digital download, streaming	—	—	—	—	—	27

=== Extended plays ===
List of extended plays
Title	EP details
Wife Beater	Released: July 13, 2010; Label: InVogue; Formats: EP, digital download, streaming
Vol. 1	Released: January 12, 2024; Label: Fearless; Formats: EP, digital download, streaming
Vol. 2	Released: May 10, 2024; Label: Fearless; Formats: EP, digital download, streaming
Vol. 3	Released: November 8, 2024; Label: Fearless; Formats: EP, digital download, streaming

=== Singles ===
Title	Year	Peak chart positions		Certifications	Album
Title	Year	US Hard Rock	US Main. Rock	Certifications	Album
"Unwelcome"	2010	—	—		First Born
"Miscarriage"	2011	—	—		First Born
"Premeditated"	2012	—	—		Could You Watch Your Children Burn
"Fiction Religion"	2012	—	—		Could You Watch Your Children Burn
"My Old Ways"	2015	—	—		Happiness in Self Destruction
"Crows"	2015	—	—		Non-album single
"Take Me Away"	2015	—	—		Happiness in Self Destruction
"Dear Old Friend"	2015	—	—		Happiness in Self Destruction
"Feel Nothing"	2017	—	—	RIAA: Platinum; MC: Platinum	Dispose
"Not Just Breathing"	2017	—	—		Dispose
"Disposable Fix"	2018	—	—		Dispose
"Repay"	2020	—	—		Non-album single
"Face Me"	2021	—	—		Swan Song
"Enemy"	2021	—	—		Swan Song
"Paradigm"	2021	—	—		Swan Song
"Divide"	2022	—	—		The Plot in You
"Left Behind"	2023	—	—		The Plot in You
"Forgotten"	2023	24	—		The Plot in You
"Closure"	2024	—	28		The Plot in You
"Don't Look Away"	2024	—	—		The Plot in You
"Been Here Before"	2024	—	—		The Plot in You
"Pretend"	2024	—	—		The Plot in You
"Silence"	2025	—	—		The Plot in You
"You Get One"	2026	—	—		The Plot in You

As featured artist

Year	Song	Album	Artist
2010	"Your Existence" (featuring Landon Tewers)	Sweet Talker	Like Moths to Flames
2011	"The Lost Ones" (featuring Landon Tewers)	Echoes & Answers EP	From Atlantis
2011	"Vena Cava" (featuring Landon Tewers)	Bring On the Search	Avalanche
2012	"At the Ballet" (featuring Landon Tewers)	In, and of Myself EP	Restless Streets
2012	"Revival" (featuring Landon Tewers)	Redemption	Before Their Eyes
2014	"Sinister" (featuring Landon Tewers and Ben Keller)	Sickness: Volume 1	VCTMS
2014	"Ignorance" (featuring Landon Tewers)	Non-album single	In Honor
2014	"Smelling Salts" (featuring Landon Tewers)	Heavy Hearts	For the Fallen Dreams
2014	"Where Dead Men Come Alive" (featuring Landon Tewers)	Non-album singles	Pathkeeper
2014	"Through Hell" (featuring Landon Tewers)	Non-album singles	Prepared Like a Bride
2014	"A Dime a Dozen" (featuring Landon Tewers)	Burning Bridges EP	Personalities
2014	"Circles" (featuring Landon Tewers)	Non-album single	Sleeping Through Headphones
2015	"Eyes Wide Shut" (featuring Landon Tewers)	The Edge of Existence	Empires Fade
2015	"Slave to the Dime" (featuring Landon Tewers)	The Trials	Crucible
2015	"The Mansion" (featuring Landon Tewers)	Landscapes	Hylian
2015	"Lead Hands" (featuring Landon Tewers)	Non-album singles	MASSiVE
2015	"There's Always Money in the Banana Stand" (featuring Landon Tewers)	Non-album singles	Unalaska
2015	"Everything Ends" (featuring Landon Tewers)	Non-album singles	Silent Screams
2016	"Wasted Time" (featuring Landon Tewers)	Rebirth	Wide Awake
2016	"Silent Echoes" (featuring Landon Tewers)	Dead // Sleep	Hollow I Am
2016	"Beaten" (featuring Landon Tewers)	The Complex Truth	Advocates
2016	"Self/Destruct" (featuring Landon Tewers)	Such Is Life	Fault Lines
2017	"Hit the Road" (featuring Landon Tewers)	The Difference	Seanzy
2017	"Rated R..." (featuring Landon Tewers)	AM/PM	The White Noise
2017	"Haters Gonna Hate" (featuring Landon Tewers)	Reflections	From Myth and Legend
2018	"Driftwood" (featuring Landon Tewers)	Better Days	Call It Home
2018	"Going Rogue" (featuring Landon Tewers)	Audiodope	Dropout Kings
2018	"Promises" (featuring Landon Tewers)	I	Safe Harbor
2019	"Let Me Down" (featuring Landon Tewers)	Non-album singles	Lil Blanket
2020	"Can't Escape" (featuring Landon Tewers)	Non-album singles	Coda Meraki
2021	"Overdose" (featuring Landon Tewers)	Night Therapy I	Hurtwave
2024	"Technium" (featuring Landon Tewers)	Lonely God	Fit for a King

Album appearances

List of album appearances
Title	Year	Album
"Let It Go" (James Bay cover)	2017	Punk Goes Pop Vol. 7

=== Music videos ===
Year	Song	Director
2011	"Miscarriage"	Unknown
2013	"Premeditated"	Unknown
2013	"Fiction Religion"	Unknown
2013	"Troll"	Unknown
2015	"My Old Ways"	Unknown
2015	"Crows"	Unknown
2015	"Take Me Away"	Scott Hansen
2016	"Time Changes Everything"	Mathis Arnell
2017	"Feel Nothing"	Mathis Arnell
2017	"Not Just Breathing"	Mathis Arnell
2018	"Disposable Fix"	Mathis Arnell
2018	"I Always Wanted to Leave"	Mathis Arnell
2018	"The One You Loved"	Mathis Arnell
2021	"Face Me"	Orie McGinness
2021	"Paradigm"	Orie McGinness
2022	"Divide"	George Gallardo Kattah
2023	"Left Behind"	George Gallardo Kattah
2023	"Forgotten"	George Gallardo Kattah
2024	"Closure"	George Gallardo Kattah
2024	"Don't Look Away"	George Gallardo Kattah
2024	"Been Here Before"	George Gallardo Kattah
2024	"Pretend"	George Gallardo Kattah
2024	"Spare Me"	George Gallardo Kattah
2025	"Silence"	George Gallardo Kattah
2026	"You Get One"	George Gallardo Kattah
2026	"Carved"	George Gallardo Kattah
