= Could You Watch Your Children Burn =

Studio album by The Plot in You
- Released: January 15, 2013
- Genre: Metalcore
- Length: 36:00
- Label: Rise
- Producer: Landon Tewers

The Plot in You chronology
First Born (2011)	Could You Watch Your Children Burn (2013)	Happiness in Self Destruction (2015)

Singles from Could You Watch Your Children Burn
- 1. "Premeditated" Released: December 10, 2012; 2. "Fiction Religion" Released: December 25, 2012

Professional ratings
Review scores
Source	Rating
AllMusic	3/5 stars

Could You Watch Your Children Burn is the second studio album by American metalcore band The Plot in You. The album was announced November 25, 2012, and was released on January 15, 2013. It is the band's first album with guitarist Derrick Sechrist (former clean vocalist/guitarist of A Bullet for Pretty Boy) following Anthony Thoma's departure after their debut, First Born. The first single from the album, "Premeditated", was released on December 10, 2012. The second single, "Fiction Religion", was out on December 25, 2012. On January 2, 2013, the rest of the album was uploaded onto Rise Records' YouTube page, almost two weeks prior to release, as a result of the album leaking. On the Billboard charts, the album debuted at 110 on Billboard 200, peaked at 18 on Independent Albums, and peaked at 4 on Hard Rock Albums.

Unlike First Born, the album is not a concept album, but faces similar dark themes that the band's releases typically have.

== Track listing ==
No.	Title	Length
1.	"Premeditated"	4:06
2.	"Fiction Religion"	3:36
3.	"Digging Your Grave"	3:21
4.	"Population Control"	3:23
5.	"Troll"	3:18
6.	"The Devil's Contract"	3:31
7.	"Shyann Weeps"	3:10
8.	"Sober and Soulless"	4:08
9.	"Bible Butcher"	3:22
10.	"Glad You're Gone"	4:05
Total length:		36:00

== Personnel ==
The Plot in You

- Landon Tewers – vocals, guitars, bass, keyboards, engineering, mixing, mastering, production
- Cole Worden – drums

Additional personnel

- Andrew Roesch and Shawn Carrano – management
- Phill Mamula – artwork

== Charts ==
Chart (2013)	Peak position
US Billboard 200	110
US Top Rock Albums (Billboard)	29
US Top Hard Rock Albums (Billboard)	4
US Independent Albums (Billboard)	18
US Heatseekers Albums (Billboard)	1
