= Boundaries (band) =

American metalcore band

- Origin: Hartford, Connecticut
- Genres: Metalcore; beatdown hardcore
- Years active: 2013–present
- Labels: 3DOT Recordings; Unbeaten; Sumerian
- Members: Matthew McDougal; Cory Emond; Tim Sullivan; Nathan Calcagno; Cody DelVecchio
- Past members: Jake Buzzell; Zadak Brooks; Kevin Stevens; Lucian Armstrong; Brandon Breedlove; Junior Scarpa
- Website: boundariesct.com

Boundaries is an American metalcore band from Hartford, Connecticut. The band lineup currently consists of lead vocalist Matthew McDougal, rhythm guitarist Cory Emond, drummer/clean vocalist Tim Sullivan, bassist Nathan Calcagno, and lead guitarist Cody DelVecchio.

== History ==
=== Formation (2013–2016) ===
Boundaries was formed in 2013, with original lead guitarist Zadak Brooks recruiting musicians from another local band that had split up at the same time Brooks' own cover band had failed. Their first release came in 2014, being the single Two Faced. The recording was done with original vocalist Jake Buzzell, while featuring Matthew McDougal who would go on to later become the band's full-time frontman after the release of the single. The band continued to record and release singles with McDougal as vocalist, some of which would later appear on their Spring Demonstration EP in 2018.

=== Hartford County Misery (2017–2018) ===
In spring of 2017 the band released Hartford County Misery, which included single Sour Mouth originally released in 2016. During this time, bassist Lucian Armstrong left the band and was replaced by Brandon Breedlove.

=== My Body in Bloom (2019) ===
In 2018, Boundaries were signed to Unbeaten Records and released their first label-backed project, My Body in Bloom, on February 22, 2019. Recording for the EP took place over the course of 2018-2019, and singles Blush as well as title track My Body in Bloom came out prior to its release. Current bassist Nathan Calcagno was recruited as a touring member around this time, before officially joining in 2022.

=== Your Receding Warmth (2020–2021) ===
The band's first full-length LP would release on November 13, 2020 by the name of Your Receding Warmth. Three singles were released to promote the album, Carve, Behind the Bend, & I'd Rather Not Say. All three singles were paired with respective music videos, all directed by Erick Easterday. Recording sessions would feature Matthew Di Guglielmo on drums and Junior Scarpa playing guitar, although Guglielmo would never join the lineup officially after recording for the album took place. On most promotional material for the album, only four band members are displayed: McDougal, Emond, Brooks, and Scarpa.

=== Burying Brightness and lineup changes (2022–2023) ===
In 2022, Boundaries released their second full-length album, Burying Brightness, through 3DOT Recordings. Before the record was released, founder Zadak Brooks left the band and was replaced by Cody DelVecchio on lead guitar. In promotion of the album, three singles were released: Heaven's Broken Heart, Realize and Rebuild, and Burying Brightness.

=== Death Is Little More (2024–2025) ===
On February 8, 2024, Boundaries released lead single Easily Erased in promotion of their upcoming album Death Is Little More, which was set to release on March 29, 2024. The record was released through 3DOT Recordings, and saw further singles A Pale Light Lingers and Scars On A Soul before the release of the album.

=== Yearning: The unbeautiful after and signing to Sumerian Records (2026) ===
On March 17, 2026, Boundaries teased a new release in their Instagram page, with the caption "It's all around us now...", following with the drop of the name of the new song, "Skies cast amber black". On March 20, 2026, the record label Sumerian Records announced Boundaries as their new signing, in their Instagram post. In the same post, Sumerian announced the release of the song and the music video.

On April 24th, 2026, Boundaries released the next single "Death will follow me", and announced their new album, Yearning: The unbeautiful after.

On May 29, 2026, Boundaries released the third single, "Only endless".

On June 19, 2026, Boundaries released the fourth and final single, "May this pain never leave".

The album was released on July 17th, 2026, and contains songs with features from Make Them Suffer, and Landon Tewers, the lead singer of metalcore band The Plot in You.

== Discography ==
=== Studio albums ===
- Your Receding Warmth (2020)
- Burying Brightness (2022)
- Death Is Little More (2024)
- Yearning: The unbeautiful after (2026)

=== EPs ===
- Defector (2015)
- Hartford County Misery (2017)
- Spring Demonstration (2018)
- My Body in Bloom (2019)

=== Singles ===
Year	Song	Album
2014	"Two Faced"	Non-album single
2015	"Swine"	Defector
2015	"Worm Den"	Defector
2016	"Sour Mouth"	Hartford County Misery
2018	"Blush"	My Body in Bloom
2019	"My Body in Bloom"	My Body in Bloom
2020	"Carve"	Your Receding Warmth
2020	"Behind the Bend"	Your Receding Warmth
2020	"I'd Rather Not Say"	Your Receding Warmth
2022	"Heaven's Broken Heart"	Burying Brightness
2022	"Realize and Rebuild"	Burying Brightness
2022	"Burying Brightness"	Burying Brightness
2023	"Bedlam"	Non-album single
2023	"Armageddon"	Non-album single
2024	"Easily Erased"	Death Is Little More
2024	"A Pale Light Lingers"	Death Is Little More
2024	"Scars On A Soul"	Death Is Little More
2026	"Skies cast amber black"	Yearning: The unbeautiful after
2026	"Death will follow me"	Yearning: The unbeautiful after
2026	"Only endless"	Yearning: The unbeautiful after
2026	"May this pain never leave"	Yearning: The unbeautiful after
