= The Plot in You (album) =

Studio album by The Plot in You
- Released: July 10, 2026
- Recorded: 2022–2026
- Length: 40:17
- Label: Fearless
- Producer: Landon Tewers

The Plot in You chronology
Swan Song (2021)	The Plot in You (2026)

The Plot in You (also referred to as the Volume series) is the sixth studio album by the American metalcore band The Plot in You. The album was released on July 10, 2026, through Fearless Records.

== Release and promotion ==
On April 3, 2026, The Plot in You announced their self-titled album, which was released on July 10.

=== Singles ===
On October 25, 2022, The Plot in You unveiled the first single "Divide". On December 1, the music video for the single was published. On February 8, 2023, the band released the second single "Left Behind" along with an accompanying music video. On August 11, the band unveiled the third single "Forgotten" and along with a music video.

On January 19, 2024, The Plot in You released a new single titled "Closure", following the band's issued digital EP Vol. 1, which was released on January 12. The EP compiled three previously released singles from the group. In addition, the band also announced its follow-up, Vol. 2, released on May 3, 2024. On March 8, the band premiered the single "Don't Look Away" and its corresponding music video. On November 8, the band released a third installment, Vol. 3, including the singles "Been Here Before" and "Pretend".

== Track listing ==
All tracks are written by Landon Tewers, with additional writers where noted.

The Plot in You track listing
No.	Title	Writer(s)	Length
1.	"Divide"	Josh Childress; Michael Cooper	3:28
2.	"Left Behind"	Childress; Cooper; Madison Tewers	3:26
3.	"Forgotten"	Childress	2:55
4.	"Closure"	Alex Ballew	3:13
5.	"Don't Look Away"	Ballew	3:13
6.	"All That I Can Give"	Ballew	3:18
7.	"Been Here Before"	Brody Smith	4:27
8.	"Pretend"		3:05
9.	"Spare Me"	Ballew	3:37
10.	"Silence"		3:11
11.	"You Get One"		3:00
12.	"Carved"		3:18
Total length:			40:17

== Personnel ==
Credits are adapted from the album's liner notes and Tidal.

=== The Plot in You ===
- Josh Childress – guitar (tracks 1–10), creative direction
- Michael Cooper – drums (1–10)
- Landon Tewers – vocals, production, engineering (all tracks); bass guitar, drums, guitar (11, 12)
- Ethan Yoder – bass guitar (1–10)

=== Additional contributors ===
- Zakk Cervini – mixing, mastering
- Julian Gargiulo – mixing assistance
- Wyatt Clough – photography, creative direction
- Tijana Petrović – production design
- Nick Hamm – album layout, design
- George Gallardo – additional imagery and design
- Sage LaMonica – additional imagery and design

== Charts ==
Chart performance for The Plot in You
Chart (2026)	Peak position
Australian Albums (ARIA)	27
Belgian Albums (Ultratop Flanders)	195
French Physical Albums (SNEP)	199
French Rock & Metal Albums (SNEP)	33
German Albums (Offizielle Top 100)	89
UK Rock & Metal Albums (Official Charts)	27
US Top Album Sales (Billboard)	48
