= Satyr (band) =

American post-hardcore band

- Origin: Atlanta, Georgia, United States
- Genres: Post-hardcore; progressive metal; experimental rock; mathcore; djent
- Years active: 2016–2023
- Label: Kill Iconic
- Past members: Michael Campbell; Janald Long; Brody Taylor Smith; Calvin Cox
- Website: www.satyratl.com

Satyr was an American progressive post-hardcore band from Atlanta, Georgia composed of vocalists and guitarists Michael Campbell, Janald Long, and drummer Brody Taylor Smith, who were signed to Kill Iconic Records. They released two studio albums, their acclaimed independent debut, Locus (2020) and Totem (2022) via Kill Iconic.

The band quietly entered an indefinite hiatus in July 2023, following the departure and announcement of Smith, joining and touring full-time with Texas ambient metalcore band, Invent Animate as their new official drummer.

== History ==
Formed in 2016, Satyr started as the bedroom musical project of main songwriter Michael "Soup" Campbell while attending Georgia State University. Wanting to create rock music that was technically proficient with strong melodies and structure, Campbell began creating material and performing with a few classmates, which included original bassist, Calvin Cox during their early formation. After a few months of rotating members and continued songwriting, a high school acquaintance of Campbell's—drummer Brody Taylor Smith and a friend of Cox—lead vocalist and guitarist Janald Long joined.

With a solidified lineup, the group began recording material with Atlanta engineer and producer, Corey Bautista in 2017. On February 28, 2018, the band self-released their debut EP, Neutrino!, preceded by the single "Andromeda" on January 20, 2018. After the EP's release, Satyr focused on out-of-state performances and shared the stage with such acts as Eidola, Tera Melos, Good Tiger, Strawberry Girls, and Icarus the Owl despite being an unsigned act.

On February 21, 2020, Satyr released Locus, their debut studio album recorded and produced by Bautista. The album was preceded by three singles: "Picayune", "Bird", and "Aesop". On May 26, 2021, the group revealed that they had begun recording material with Bautista for their second full-length record. One month later, Satyr announced that they had signed to Kill Iconic, a start-up record label founded by Hail The Sun's drummer and frontman, Donovan Melero.

During September 2021, it was revealed Calvin Cox had left the group to complete university and pursue a career in business computing after receiving a reply from a fan questioning his absence from a YouTube community post detailing the band's progress on their next LP. It was further stated, they would continue as a trio and recruit a new bassist for live performances, who was later revealed to be Ryne Jones, a local Atlanta musician and friend of the band. Satyr concluded the rest of that year, touring as support acts for The Fall of Troy's "Doppelgänger" 16th Anniversary and Intervals U.S Winter 2021 tours respectively.

On May 6, 2022, the band announced their second studio album, Totem, which released July 1, 2022 via Kill Iconic Records. The lead single, "Vector" was released alongside the announcement. The album was preceded by remaining singles, "Attrition", "Whelmed" and "Dogma" which were released on June 3, June 17 and July 4, 2022 respectively.

Following the album's release, the band would support Hail the Sun on a string of U.S East Coast performances of their first two EP's (2012's Elephantitis and 2017's Secret Wars) during Summer 2022 and continue as one of the opening acts on Kurt Travis-fronted progressive rock project, Gold Necklace and Bakersfield musician, Andrés co-headlined U.S Fall tour throughout October 2022. Campbell and Long would also be featured as vocalists on Atlanta instrumental progressive rock band, Challenger Deep's single "The Great Calamity" released October 28, 2022.

Satyr would continue touring into the next year, most notably performing Kill Iconic Fest at House of Blues in Anaheim, California on January 8, 2023 and supporting The Fall of Troy on the East Coast leg of their self-titled debut album 20th Anniversary U.S Tour w/ Portrayal of Guilt and Venezuelan punk band, Zeta throughout February 2023.

Due to a scheduling conflict while being away on tour as a fill-in for Texas ambient metalcore band, Invent Animate, Smith would be unavailable to perform these shows and New York-based drummer, James Knoerl of Boston progressive rock band, Aviations would be recruited in his absence. The band would go on to release an Audiotree Live studio session on June 1, 2023, recorded while on tour in Chicago and a 55 minute documentary, "The Making of Totem" later on Jul 14, 2023. The subject of the film mainly featuring behind the scenes footage, interviews and commentary from Campbell, Long, Smith and Bautista detailing the writing, recording and production process of their second studio album.

On Jul 31, 2023, it was announced Smith would continue to tour and permanently join Invent Animate as their official drummer. During an appearance on American drumming podcast "Crash Bang Boom Podcast" in July 2024, Smith quietly confirmed due to his departure, Satyr is currently inactive with no plans for new music or performing in the future.

== Musical style and influences ==
The band's music has been characterized as post-hardcore blended with progressive metal, mathcore, and djent rhythms performed with technical intricacy and complex song structures into a unique sound. Most notably, the fluid interchanging clean and scream vocals by Long and Campbell respectively add a contrasting yet complementary dynamic signature to their sound.

Collectively, the group has cited bands such as Dance Gavin Dance, Hail The Sun, The Fall of Troy, Veil of Maya, Periphery, The Dillinger Escape Plan and Meshuggah as influential to their sound.

== Post-breakup activity ==
Following Satyr's dissolution, Smith has continued touring full-time with Invent Animate since 2023, performing a number of high profile shows and festivals annually, as well as recording with the group, making his debut contributions on the deluxe version of their fourth and latest studio album, Heavener (Definitive) reissued May 31, 2024 and most recently on the split EP Bloom in Heaven, along with American metalcore band, Silent Planet released March 28, 2025 via Australian independent label, UNFD.

Long has remained musically active since the split with a budding progressive soul, electro pop solo project, under the mononym, "Devoy" and is currently managed by Halle Berry's romantic partner and American musician, Van Hunt. Long's debut single, "Left In The Dark" was released July 25, 2025 via OnTheHunt Music Group.

== Members ==
Former

- Michael "Soup" Campbell – unclean vocals, guitar (2016–2023), bass (2021–2023)
- Janald "JD" Devoy Long – clean vocals, guitar (2017–2023)
- Brody Taylor Smith – drums, percussion (2017–2023)
- Calvin "Dolphin" Cox – bass (2017–2020)

Touring

- Ryne "Pork" Jones – bass (2021–2023)
- James Knoerl – drums (2023)

== Discography ==
=== Studio albums ===
- Locus (2020)
- Totem (2022)

=== Extended plays ===
- Neutrino! (2018)
