= My Old Ways (disambiguation) =

"My Old Ways" is a song by Tame Impala.

My Old Ways may also refer to:

- "My Old Ways", a song by Dr. Dog from the album We All Belong, 2007
- "My Old Ways", a song by the Plot in You from the album Happiness in Self Destruction, 2015
- "My Old Ways", a song by Status Quo from the album Quid Pro Quo, 2011
