= Locus =

Locus (plural loci) is Latin for "place". It may refer to:

== Mathematics and science ==
- Locus (mathematics), the set of points satisfying a particular condition, often forming a curve
- Root locus analysis, a diagram visualizing the position of roots as a parameter changes
- Locus (archaeology), the smallest definable unit in stratigraphy
- Locus (genetics), the position of a gene or other significant sequence on a chromosome

== Humanities and social science ==
- Locus (rhetoric), another name for a literary or rhetorical topos, a method of constructing an argument
- Locus of control, the degree to which people have control over events
- Method of loci, a mnemonic system that uses the spatial memory of a familiar place to enhance recollection

== Computing ==
- LOCUS (operating system), a distributed OS developed at UCLA, notable for single-system image idea
- Locus Computing Corporation (1982–1995), commercialized the LOCUS distributed operating system developed at UCLA
- Locus Map, an Android navigation app using maps of various providers in online and offline mode
- Wang LOCI (Logarithmic Computing Instrument), an early scientific calculator by Wang

== Entertainment ==
- Locus (comics), a Marvel Comics mutant villainess, a member of the Mutant Liberation Front
- Locus (magazine), science fiction and fantasy magazine
  - Locus Award, presented to the winners of Locus magazine's annual readers' poll
- Locus (video game), a 1995 video game by Zombie Studios
- Locus (Chicago Underground Duo album), 2014
- Locus (Satyr album), 2020

== Other ==
- HTT Pléthore (Locus Plethore), a Canadian supercar proposed by HTT Automobile in Quebec, Canada
- UCLouvain Faculty of Architecture, Architectural Engineering and Urban Planning (LOCI) of the University of Louvain in Belgium

== See also ==
- Locust, various species of grasshopper with a swarming phase
