= UnityTX =

American metal band

- Origin: Dallas, Texas
- Genres: Rap metal; nu metal; industrial metal; hardcore punk
- Years active: 2014–present
- Label: Pure Noise
- Spinoff of: Set the Sun
- Members: Jay Webster; Brandon Castaneda; Kendrick Nicholson; Jonathan Flores
- Website: unitytxroc.com

UnityTX is an American heavy metal band from Dallas founded in 2014.

== History ==
Founded in 2013, they released their debut EP, The Besides in 2016, followed by Madboy in 2019. In 2023 their released the studio album Ferality. In 2024, they put out two EPs: Playing Favorites and MASTICATE, followed by the single "Heinous" in spring 2025.

On January 22, 2026, the band announced their second album, Somewhere, in Between…, which is set for release on March 13.

== Style ==
Considered primarily to be a hardcore/rap metal band, they incorporate elements of hip-hop, trap, electronica, and drill among other genres into their music.

== Members ==
- Jay Webster – vocals
- Brandon Castaneda – guitar
- Kendrick Nicholson – bass
- Jonathan Flores – drums

== Past Members ==
- Alberto Vazquez — guitar
- Miguel Melecio Jr — drums

== Discography ==
=== Albums ===
- Ferality (2023)
- Somewhere, in Between… (2026)

=== EPs ===
- The Besides (2016)
- Madboy (2019)
- HELLWAY (2021)
- Playing Favorites (2024)
- MASTICATE (2024)
