= AM/PM (album) =

Studio album by The White Noise
- Released: June 23, 2017
- Genres: Post-hardcore; punk rock; hardcore punk; melodic hardcore; industrial punk
- Length: 34:17
- Label: Fearless
- Producer: Drew Fulk

The White Noise chronology
Aren't You Glad? (2016)	AM/PM (2017)

Singles from AM/PM
- 1. "Bite Marks" Released: May 11, 2017; 2. "The Best Songs are Dead" Released: June 2, 2017

Professional ratings
Review scores
Source	Rating
Rock Sound	8/10 stars
Sound Fiction	8.1 stars on a 10 point scale
Alternative Press	3.5/5 stars

AM/PM is the only studio album by American punk rock band the White Noise. The album was released on June 23, 2017, through Fearless Records and produced by Drew Fulk. In May 2017, the ensemble released a music video for "Bite Marks", the first single from their album. The album takes its name from the song of the same name by Give up the Ghost from their 2001 LP Background Music.

== Music ==
AM/PM features musical styles ranging from emo, pop punk and radio rock to alternative metal, metalcore, post-hardcore, punk rock, hardcore punk industrial punk, ambient hardcore and melodic hardcore; songs such as "I Lost My Mind (In California)" have been described as a 90s-inspired pop punk curveball compared to the metalcore of "Picture Day", alternative metal of "Bite Marks", and ferocious hardcore punk of "All The Best Songs are Dead" and "Rated R..."; leading to the album being compared to the styles of Beartooth, Bring Me the Horizon and Comeback Kid. Rock Sound hailed the album being non-nonsensical and far from boring.

== Track listing ==
No.	Title	Length
1.	"Innocent Until Birth"	2:53
2.	"Bite Marks"	3:19
3.	"Picture Day"	3:21
4.	"The Best Songs Are Dead"	2:58
5.	"I Lost My Mind (In California)"	3:04
6.	"Rated R..." (featuring Landon Tewers)	2:53
7.	"All Drugs Go to Heaven"	3:07
8.	"Montreal"	3:49
9.	"24 Hour Revenge Therapy"	3:29
10.	"Sunspots"	5:24
Total length:		34:17

== Personnel ==
Credits taken from the Fearless Records website.

=== The White Noise ===
- Shawn Walker – lead vocals
- David Southern – clean vocals, bass, keyboards
- Josh "KJ" Strock – lead guitar, keyboards
- Bailey Crego – rhythm guitar
- Tommy West – drums

=== Production ===
- Drew Fulk – mixing, production, writing
- Jeff Dunne – engineering, mixing
- Chris Athens – mastering
