= Swan Song (album) =

Studio album by The Plot in You
- Released: September 17, 2021
- Recorded: November 2019 – May 2021
- Genres: Metalcore; post-hardcore
- Length: 35:17
- Label: Fearless
- Producers: Landon Tewers; Drew Fulk

The Plot in You chronology
Dispose (2018)	Swan Song (2021)	The Plot in You (2026)

Singles from Swan Song
- 1. "Face Me" Released: July 29, 2021; 2. "Enemy" Released: August 19, 2021; 3. "Paradigm" Released: September 9, 2021

Swan Song is the fifth studio album by American metalcore band The Plot in You. The album was released on September 17, 2021, through Fearless Records. It was produced by Landon Tewers and Drew Fulk.

== Background and promotion ==
On November 5, 2019, Landon Tewers announced on Instagram that he is working on new material for the band and his side project Ai640. It wouldn't be until the beginning of April 2020 that Tewers would go on to update the album's progress going on to state that: "...we're a little over half way done tracking the new plot record and I'm really excited to get another record out. The new shit is truly unlike anything we've ever done..". In May 2021, Tewers officially announced the album is completed.

On July 29, the band officially released the new lead single "Face Me" along with its music video. At the same time, the band revealed the album itself, the album cover, the track list, and release date. To promote the album, the band also announced that they will support Silverstein's rescheduled 20th anniversary tour along with Can't Swim in November 2021. On August 19, the band unveiled the second single "Enemy". On September 9, one week before the album release, the band released the third single "Paradigm" and its corresponding music video.

== Critical reception ==
Professional ratings
Review scores
Source	Rating
Distorted Sound	8/10
Rock 'N' Load	9/10
Wall of Sound	8/10

The album received generally positive reviews from critics. Distorted Sound scored the album 8 out of 10 and said: "With Swan Song, THE PLOT IN YOU have laid their souls bare and offered us access to the most honest and intimate parts of themselves. Perhaps it is simply their way of cleansing themselves, or them taking the opportunity to reassure us as the listener – and themselves – that life gets better when things are bleak. It doesn't really matter. The record is harrowing and beautiful in equal measure, and one of the most important learning experiences this year will offer." Rock 'N' Load praised the album saying, "Swan Song is less of an album and more a therapeutic release of emotion that ends on a feeling of enlightenment. With incredible musicianship throughout, as well as hard hitting, raw lyrics that cut to bone, this album is everything fans of The Plot In You would have come to expect of the group, while still sounding fresh and refined." Wall of Sound gave the album 8/10 and saying: "In this closing moment, though, Landon is 'freed' from all of that negative bullshit. Like a message in a bottle hurled into the sea or, a paper of confessions burnt up by the fire, this was a purge. Thankfully, The Plot In You haven't purged their passion or creativity. On Swan Song, it's over-flowing."

== Track listing ==
All lyrics are written by Landon Tewers; all music is composed by The Plot in You.

Swan Song track listing
No.	Title	Length
1.	"Letters to a Dead Friend"	3:54
2.	"Fall Again"	3:14
3.	"Face Me"	3:28
4.	"Too Far Gone"	3:54
5.	"Paradigm"	3:20
6.	"Both to Blame"	3:54
7.	"Too Heavy"	3:40
8.	"Enemy"	3:40
9.	"Whole Without Me"	2:52
10.	"Freed"	3:21
Total length:		35:17

== Personnel ==
Credits adapted from Discogs.

The Plot in You

- Landon Tewers – vocals, keyboards, programming, guitars, engineering, mixing, production, recording
- Josh Childress – guitars
- Ethan Yoder – bass
- Michael Cooper – drums, percussion

Additional musicians

- Alex Ohagan – strings

Additional personnel

- Drew Fulk – production, recording
- Alex Ohagan – additional production
- Mike Kalajian – engineering, mastering
- Anna Mrzyglocki – project management
- Richard Fernandes – management
- Marco Walzel and Eric Powell – booking
- Cody Demavivas – A&R
- Florian Mihr – art direction, design
- Rowan Daly – photography
- Levi Seitz – lacquer cut
- Brooke Lorraine and Will Hackney – album cover models
