= Aren't You Glad? =

EP by The White Noise
- Released: February 26, 2016
- Genres: Post-hardcore; punk rock; hardcore punk; melodic hardcore
- Length: 19:21
- Label: Fearless
- Producer: Drew Fulk

The White Noise chronology
Desolate (2011)	Aren't You Glad? (2016)	AM/PM (2017)

Singles from Aren't You Glad
- 1. "Bloom" Released: August 13, 2015; 2. "Red Eye Lids" Released: October 21, 2015; 3. "Picture Day" Released: February 26, 2016

Professional ratings
Review scores
Source	Rating
New Transcendence	5/5 stars
Sound Fiction	8.7/10 stars
Idobi	8/10 stars
Loud and Heavy	86.67%

Aren't You Glad? is the third release by American punk rock band The White Noise, and the first under their moniker The White Noise. The EP was released on February 26, 2016, under Fearless Records.

== Music ==
With Aren't You Glad, the White Noise blends elements of post-hardcore, melodic hardcore, hardcore punk and punk rock.

== Track listing ==
No.	Title	Length
1.	"The Doctor Will See You Now"	2:14
2.	"Bloom"	3:54
3.	"Picture Day"	3:21
4.	"Red Eye Lids"	3:35
5.	"Brainwashed"	3:04
6.	"Cosmopolitician"	3:13
Total length:		19:21

== Personnel ==
The White Noise

- Shawn Walker – unclean vocals
- David Southern – clean vocals, rhythm guitar, keyboards
- Josh "KJ" Strock – lead guitar, keyboards
- Bailey Crego – bass
- Tommy West – drums

Production

- Brad Blackwood – mastering
- Drew Fulk – mixing, producing
