= First Born (The Plot in You album) =

Studio album by The Plot in You
- Released: April 18, 2011
- Genre: Metalcore
- Length: 30:18
- Label: Rise
- Producer: Landon Tewers

The Plot in You chronology
Wife Beater (2010)	First Born (2011)	Could You Watch Your Children Burn (2013)

Singles from First Born
- 1. "Unwelcome" Released: November 29, 2010; 2. "Miscarriage" Released: February 24, 2011

First Born is the debut studio album by American metalcore band The Plot in You. It was produced, composed, and completely played by the band's vocalist, Landon Tewers and was released through Rise Records on April 18, 2011. The album is a concept album based on the story of a boy and the problems he goes through in life; facing an abusive father among other challenges such as bereavement, abandonment, bullying, and anguish. The album "starts at the birth", and ends where he finally escapes his broken home permanently.

The album peaked at No. 36 on the Top Heatseekers chart close to a month after its release.

== Track listing ==
No.	Title	Length
1.	"The Fathers Seed"	2:55
2.	"Small Face"	2:56
3.	"Bully"	3:20
4.	"Miscarriage"	3:34
5.	"Rat Poison"	2:51
6.	"Neighbors"	3:18
7.	"Filth"	2:57
8.	"Unwelcome"	3:30
9.	"Nothing Leaves This Room"	3:10
10.	"Dear Dad"	1:44
Total length:		30:18

== Personnel ==
Credits adapted from Discogs.

The Plot in You

- Landon Tewers – vocals, guitars, bass, engineering, mixing, mastering, production
- Cole Worden – drums

Additional personnel

- Alex Wade and Shawn Carrano – management
- Cody Delong – booking
- Dan Mumford – artwork, cover illustration
- Matt Day – photography
- Rise Records – layout

== Charts ==
Chart (2011)	Peak position
US Heatseekers Albums (Billboard)	36
