= Symbiosis (A Bullet for Pretty Boy album) =

Studio album by A Bullet for Pretty Boy
- Released: July 31, 2012
- Recorded: Planet Z Studio
- Genre: Metalcore, post-hardcore
- Length: 38:16
- Label: Razor & Tie, Artery
- Producer: Zeuss

A Bullet for Pretty Boy chronology
Revision:Revise (2010)	Symbiosis (2012)

Symbiosis is the second and final studio album from A Bullet for Pretty Boy. Razor & Tie alongside Artery Recordings released the album on July 31, 2012. A Bullet for Pretty Boy worked with Zeuss, in the production of this album, at Planet Z Studio.

== Critical reception ==
Professional ratings
Review scores
Source	Rating
About.com	4/5 stars
Alternative Press	3.5/5 stars
HM Magazine	2/5 stars
Jesus Freak Hideout	3.5/5 stars
The New Review	2.5/5 stars

Awarding the album three and a half stars from Alternative Press, Phil Freeman states, "This is an impressive record that proves that metalcore still has plenty to offer when in the hands of genuinely creative musicians." Michael Weaver, giving the album three and a half stars for Jesus Freak Hideout, describes, "It's not the best metalcore album, but it has surprising replay value and should provide plenty of enjoyment for one looking to consume some new metalcore." Rating the album four stars at About.com, Todd Lyons writes, "The intelligent detail in the design of Symbiosis is enthralling from first track to last." Anthony Bryant, awarding the album two stars by HM Magazine, says, "The melodies on the album often seem to sound like an after thought ... The breakdowns came across forced and rushed." Giving the album two and a half stars for The New Review, Luke Amos states, "Symbiosis ultimately ends up sounding bland and shallow."

== Track listing ==
No.	Title	Length
1.	"Red Medic"	3:47
2.	"Forgiven Not Forgotten"	3:47
3.	"Come Clean"	4:42
4.	"White Noise"	4:06
5.	"Illumination"	3:06
6.	"The Grateful Prey"	4:04
7.	"De(v)tails"	4:15
8.	"Reptilian Tongue"	1:02
9.	"Obstruct"	3:42
10.	"Self-Disclosure"	5:45
Total length:		38:16
