= Dispose (album) =

Studio album by The Plot in You
- Released: February 16, 2018
- Genre: Post-hardcore; pop rock
- Length: 34:38
- Label: Fearless
- Producer: Landon Tewers; Drew Fulk

The Plot in You chronology
Happiness in Self Destruction (2015)	Dispose (2018)	Swan Song (2021)

Singles from Dispose
- 1. "Feel Nothing" Released: June 15, 2017; 2. "Not Just Breathing" Released: November 19, 2017; 3. "Disposable Fix" Released: February 3, 2018

Dispose is the fourth studio album by American metalcore band The Plot in You. The album was released on February 16, 2018, through Fearless Records. It was produced by Landon Tewers and Drew Fulk.

== Background ==
On June 15, 2017, the band announced their signing with Fearless Records, and premiered a new song "Feel Nothing". The band worked with producer Drew Fulk, the first time they've worked with an outside producer on an album. The album was officially announced on November 19, 2017.

The lyrics on the album deal with singer Landon Tewers "detaching himself from a toxic relationship" and "explores the stages of said relationship". The album is the first by the band to be written and recorded as a full band, previous records were written and performed by Tewers entirely. The band wrote 20 songs in preparation for the album. Tewers drew inspiration from pop acts including Sevdaliza, Jorja Smith and The Weeknd when writing the album. The album features a departure from previous sound, with electronic instrumentation and "R&B-inspired" clean vocals.

== Critical reception ==
Professional ratings
Review scores
Source	Rating
Depth	4.5/5 stars
Distorted Sound	2/5 stars
Hysteria	3.5/5 stars
KillYourStereo	85/100
Mind Equals Blown	3/5 stars
The Music	3.5/5 stars
New Noise	4/5 stars
Rock Sound	4.5/5 stars
The Soundboard	2.5/5 stars

Dispose received generally favorable critical reviews. The album drew many comparisons to That's the Spirit by Bring Me the Horizon due to the stylistic change to pop rock.

== Track listing ==
No.	Title	Length
1.	"Rigged"	4:20
2.	"Not Just Breathing"	3:54
3.	"One Last Time"	3:19
4.	"I Always Wanted to Leave"	3:18
5.	"Feel Nothing"	3:36
6.	"Happy"	1:01
7.	"The One You Loved"	3:25
8.	"Paid in Full"	3:46
9.	"The Sound"	4:08
10.	"Disposable Fix"	3:48
Total length:		34:38

== Personnel ==
The Plot in You

- Landon Tewers – vocals, keyboards, programming, guitars, production
- Josh Childress – guitars
- Ethan Yoder – bass
- Mathis Arnell – drums, percussion

Additional musicians

- Dean Tartaglia – saxophone (track 9)

Additional personnel

- Drew Fulk – engineering, mixing, production
- Mike Kalajian – mastering
- Micah Tewers – composition (track 1)
- Kristin Biskup – project management
- Andrew Jarrin and Cody Grup – management
- Eric Powell and Marco Walzel – booking
- Cody Demavivas – A&R
- Jonathan Weiner – photography

== Charts ==
Chart (2018)	Peak position
US Billboard 200	133
US Top Rock Albums (Billboard)	22
US Top Hard Rock Albums (Billboard)	9
US Heatseekers Albums (Billboard)	1
