= Invent Animate =

American metalcore band

- Origin: Port Neches, Texas, U.S.
- Genres: Metalcore; progressive metalcore
- Years active: 2011–present
- Labels: Tragic Hero; UNFD
- Members: Keaton Goldwire; Caleb Sherraden; Trey Celaya; Marcus Vik; Brody Taylor Smith
- Past members: Cody Graham; Logan Forrest; Ben English
- Website: iaspply.com

Invent Animate (previously stylized as Invent, Animate) is an American metalcore band formed in Port Neches, Texas, in 2011. The group consists of vocalist Marcus Vik, lead guitarist Keaton Goldwire, rhythm guitarist Trey Celaya, bassist Caleb Sherraden, and drummer Brody Taylor Smith. They self-released their debut EP, Waves, on March 13, 2012. After a number of regional tours and increasing popularity in the online djent community, the band signed with Tragic Hero Records in February 2014. The band announced they would release their debut studio album, Everchanger, on August 26, 2014. Their sophomore album, Stillworld, was released on July 8, 2016. Their third album and first with Marcus Vik, Greyview, was released on March 13, 2020. Their most recent studio album, Heavener, was released through their new label, UNFD, on March 17, 2023.

== History ==
=== Formation and Waves (2011–2013) ===
Invent Animate was formed in 2011 and immediately began working on their first EP Waves. The six-track EP was recorded at 456 Recordings with producer Brian Hood, former drummer of MyChildren MyBride. The EP was featured on many online blogs such as ItDjents, Chugcore, got-djent, The Daily Mosh, The Djentlemen's Club and more. The track "Captive" featured Brendon McMaster of deathcore band The Crimson Armada. Following the release of their EP, the band played a number of shows supporting bands such as Capsize, Elitist, Close to Home, and future labelmates Erra. In late 2012, they released the single "Lightfinder", which featured Aaron Matts from Betraying the Martyrs. They released a couple of singles in 2013, "Wolf Skin" and "Half Life", the latter of which would eventually make its way onto the new album, albeit in a slightly reworked form and different tuning.

=== Everchanger, Stillworld and English's departure (2014–2019) ===
On February 17, 2014, it was announced that Invent Animate had signed a deal with Tragic Hero Records, joining bands on their roster such as A Skylit Drive, Everyone Dies in Utah, and He Is Legend. A mini-EP was released through the label's website, featuring two songs, "Courier" and "Native Intellect", that would be on the upcoming album. On July 29, the band posted through their Facebook page the confirmed track list for Everchanger and its release date, August 26, 2014. The last song on Everchanger, "Luna", was a tribute to drummer Trey Celaya's late brother, a victim of suicide. The album was recorded at 456 Recordings with producer Brian Hood, who worked with the band on their EP and previously released singles, and Jesse Cash of Erra.

In late 2015, the band moved forward without founding member Logan Forrest, with drummer Trey Celaya taking on guitar for studio sessions for future albums. On October 29, 2015, the band released the single "Darkbloom", which later appeared on the band's next effort. Their sophomore album, Stillworld, was released on July 8, 2016, along with the music video for the song "White Wolf". In June 2017, they removed the comma from their name, which was previously stylized "Invent, Animate."

On January 9, 2018, founding vocalist Ben English announced that he would leave the band, stating that "the fire that once drove me, isn't what it once was", and that he would continue supporting the band "til the day [he's] in the ground". He stated being on the road all the time made him question if this was what he really wanted to keep doing. On June 8, the band released the instrumental version of Stillworld.

On November 1, 2019, the band posted a short video to their Facebook and Twitter pages teasing a new single that was released on November 7, 2019.

=== Arrival of Marcus Vik and Greyview (2019–2021) ===
On November 7, 2019, the band released the single "Cloud Cascade" and announced new vocalist Marcus Vik, previously of Swedish metalcore band Aviana. In early January 2020, the band joined Silent Planet, Greyhaven and Currents on the Trilogy tour. On January 11, 2020, after the tour was announced, bassist Caleb Sherraden stated he would not join the band on tour due to medical issues.

On January 24, the band released second single "Dark" and announced their third studio album, Greyview, released through Tragic Hero Records on March 13, 2020. It was the first album with Vik on vocals. On March 12, 2021, a year after the album's original release, the band released the instrumental version of Greyview.

=== Heavener, on-boarding of Brody Taylor Smith, and Heavener (Definitive) (2021–2024) ===
On September 10, 2021, Invent Animate announced they had left Tragic Hero Records and signed with independent Australian label UNFD. They also announced an EP titled The Sun Sleeps, as If It Never Was.

On September 23, the band released the three-track EP The Sun Sleeps, as If It Never Was, along with a 10-minute concept video for the EP. Drummer Trey Celaya spoke about the concept of the EP and video: "Despite all attempts to keep our darker reality shadowed in secrecy, there comes a moment in time when the truth can no longer be hidden behind closed doors or empty excuses. And at once, everything is revealed, as if the light is a constant law of nature laying bare the secrets we believe are ours to keep. In this infinite moment, the bond shared between two loved ones is severed. The flow of time does not wash away the scars; it only immortalizes what is suspended in the balance — the pain of loss, the gift of hindsight, and the curse of hope. What will always be a memory. This EP is a true story of addiction and the trauma that lies in its aftermath of a secret too dark to be hidden."

In early December 2021, it was announced Celaya, who toured with the band in the past, would join Texan metalcore band Fit for a King as their full-time drummer, after the departure of Jared Easterling. It was clarified that while Trey would remain a part of the songwriting and recording process for Invent Animate, he would no longer tour with them regularly.

In early February 2022, it was announced that the band was working on their follow-up to Greyview for a tentative spring 2022 release, and that they had enlisted frontman Landon Tewers of The Plot in You for the vocal production of the album.

On June 30, 2022, Invent Animate released the single "Shade Astray", before any official album announcement and just ahead of providing support as an opening act on Erra's "Pull from the Ghost" Tour with Alpha Wolf and Thornhill during summer 2022. During this time, Brody Taylor Smith, drummer of Atlanta post-hardcore band Satyr, would fill-in as a live member for Celaya. The band concluded the year as support acts on Impericon's Never Say Die! 2022 Tour, co-headlined by After the Burial and Suicide Silence in Europe and the United Kingdom throughout November 2022. They also released a follow-up single, "Elysium", on November 8, 2022.

On February 6, 2023, the album's third and lead single "Immolation of Night" was released alongside the announcement of their fourth studio album, Heavener, which was released March 17, 2023 through UNFD. The remaining single preceding the album's announcement was "Without a Whisper" on March 14, 2023.

Following its release, Invent Animate toured alongside Erra as support acts for Virginia rock band Bad Omens' U.S. tour during spring 2023, and were scheduled for their own headlining North American tour in promotion of the album during fall 2023 with support from Void of Vision, Thrown, and Aviana. On July 31, the band announced that touring drummer Brody Taylor Smith would join the band permanently as an official member, making his official debut in the music video for the album's fifth single, "False Meridan", released August 3, 2023.

A week before the beginning of their North American tour, the band released the album-titled single "Heavener" on September 14, 2023, marking the first release to feature Smith on drums. Another single, "Sleepless Deathbed", was released on January 18, 2024. On March 15, 2024, one year after the album's release, the band released the instrumental version of Heavener. The singles would later be revealed as part of a stylized deluxe version of the album, entitled Heavener (Definitive), released May 31, 2024 via UNFD, alongside the release of the final single, "How We Used To Say Goodbye", on May 29th, 2024.

To celebrate the 10th anniversary edition of their debut album, the band reissued Everchanger subtitled the Equinox Edition, containing an instrumental version of the album which was digitally released on August 22, 2024 with the limited physical vinyl release of the reissue which was released on September 20, 2024.

=== Bloom in Heaven EP with Silent Planet (2025–present) ===
On January 15, 2025, Invent Animate took to Instagram with a post that said "BLOOM." Whilst, Silent Planet had a post that read "IN HEAVEN." Then, on January 21, both bands tagged one another in a post that read, "1.23//IA//SP. On Thursday as the clock resets to 00:00, an angel and an alien will meet in a graveyard called Earth. Return To One." Finally, on January 23, 2025, it was announced that a new single, 'Return To One' would be released, and that they would be releasing a collaboration 3-song EP titled 'Bloom In Heaven' with Silent Planet, on March 28, 2025.

== Musical style ==
Invent Animate has been described as metalcore and progressive metalcore. The band's guitar work prominently features slide tapping, dissonance, and technical riffs. The band delivers vocals in a wide range, including mid-pitch screams, low death growls, and somber clean singing. The band has been compared to Erra, Northlane, Architects, Misery Signals, Reflections, and The Air I Breathe.

== Tours ==
Invent Animate is represented by SL Management and Sound Talent Group.

=== 2014 ===
- Heavier than Heavy U.S. Tour from August 8–30 with Oceano, I Declare War, The Last Ten Seconds of Life and Barrier.
- Fuel the Passion U.S. Tour from October 12–27 with For All I Am, Kingdom of Giants, Chasing Safety and Assassins.
- Fall Tour from November 9–20 with Betraying the Martyrs and Reflections. (The remainder of tour after November 14 would be cancelled due to Betraying the Martyrs being denied entry to Canada.)

=== 2015 ===
- Spring U.S. Tour from March 15–26 with Veil of Maya and After the Burial.
- Appearance at South by So What?! Festival on March 20 in Grand Prairie, Texas.
- Summer U.S. Tour from June 24 – July 17 with Phinehas and Silent Planet.
- Fall U.S. Tour from September 4–20 with Erra, Polyphia and The Afterimage.
- Fall North American Tour from November 5 – December 11 with Texas in July (farewell tour), Reflections and To the Wind.

=== 2016 ===
- Happiness in Self Destruction from July 9 – August 6 with The Plot in You, Erra and Sylar.
- Overdose Winter Tour from November 11 – December 18 with The Word Alive, Volumes and Islander.

=== 2017 ===
- Carry the Flame Tour from February 22 – March 23 with After the Burial, Emmure, Fit for a King and Fit for an Autopsy.
- Canada 2017 Tour from July 12–29 with Northlane and Intervals.
- Hikari Album Release Tour from November 1–22 with Oceans Ate Alaska, Dayseeker and Afterlife.
- Mesmer World Tour from November 23 – December 17 with Northlane, Erra and Ocean Grove.

=== 2020 ===
- Trilogy Tour from February 20 – March 22 with Silent Planet, Currents and Greyhaven.

=== 2022 ===
- Spring North American Tour from March 12 – April 16 with Like Moths to Flames, Polaris, and Alpha Wolf.
- "Pull from the Ghost" Summer U.S. Tour from July 15 – August 20 with Erra, Thornhill, and Alpha Wolf.
- Fall Europe & UK Impericon "Never Say Die!" Tour from November 11 – November 27 with After the Burial, Suicide Silence, Currents, Spite, Cabal and Boundaries.
- Winter U.S. Tour from December 10 – December 21 with Lost in Separation.

=== 2023 ===
- Spring Europe Tour from February 22 – March 23 with Erra, Silent Planet and Sentinels.
- "The Death We Seek Tour" Spring U.S. East Coast Tour from May 14–16 & June 6–9 with Currents, Like Moths to Flames and Foreign Hands.
- Spring North American Tour from May 17 – June 4 with Bad Omens and Erra.
- "Darkbloom" Summer Australian Tour from August 8 – September 2 with We Came as Romans.
- "Heavener" Fall North American Tour from September 22 – October 23 with Void of Vision, Thrown and Aviana.

=== 2024 ===
- Winter-Spring North American Tour from January 12 – March 14 with Beartooth, The Plot in You and Sleep Theory.
- Spring North American Tour from April 21 – May 3 with Bad Omens and I See Stars.
- "Mirror's Edge" North American Tour from June 21 – July 27 supporting Northlane, with Thornhill and Windwaker.
- "Half Living Things" Australian Tour from August 1 – August 10 supporting Alpha Wolf, with The Devil Wears Prada and Thrown.
- Fall Europe & UK Tour from September 6 – September 15 with The Plot in You.

== Members ==
Current

- Keaton Goldwire – lead guitar (2011–present)
- Caleb Sherraden – bass, backing vocals (2011–present)
- Trey Celaya – rhythm guitar (2015–present; studio only); drums, backing vocals (2011–2023);
- Marcus Vik – lead vocals (2019–present)
- Brody Taylor Smith – drums (2023–present; touring member 2022–2023)

Touring

- Lukas Vitullo – drums, backing vocals (2022)
- Jake C. Lewis – bass (2023)

Former

- Cody Graham – rhythm guitar (2011)
- Logan Forrest – rhythm guitar (2011–2015)
- Ben English – lead vocals (2011–2018)

== Discography ==
Albums

Title	Album details
Everchanger	Released: August 22, 2014; Label: Tragic Hero
Stillworld	Released: July 8, 2016; Label: Tragic Hero
Greyview	Released: March 13, 2020; Label: Tragic Hero
Heavener	Released: March 17, 2023; Label: UNFD

EPs

Title	EP details
Waves	Released: March 12, 2012; Label: Independent
The Sun Sleeps, as If It Never Was	Released: September 23, 2021; Label: UNFD
Bloom In Heaven (with Silent Planet)	Released: March 28, 2025; Label: UNFD

Singles

Title	Year	Album
"Lightfinder" (featuring Aaron Matts of Betraying the Martyrs)	2012	Non-album single
"Wolf Skin"	2013	Non-album single
"Half Life"	2013	Non-album single
"Courier"	2014	Everchanger
"Native Intellect"	2014	Everchanger
"Nocturne: Lost Faith"	2014	Everchanger
"Naturehold" (featuring Jesse Cash of Erra)	2014	Everchanger
"Darkbloom"	2015	Stillworld
"Celestial Floods"	2016	Stillworld
"White Wolf"	2016	Stillworld
"Cloud Cascade"	2019	Greyview
"Dark"	2020	Greyview
"Halcyon"	2020	Greyview
"Monarch"	2020	Greyview
"The Sun Sleeps"	2021	The Sun Sleeps, as If It Never Was
"Shade Astray"	2022	Heavener
"Elysium"	2022	Heavener
"Immolation of Night"	2023	Heavener
"Without a Whisper"	2023	Heavener
"Heavener"	2023	Heavener (Definitive)
"Sleepless Deathbed"	2024	Heavener (Definitive)
"How We Used To Say Goodbye"	2024	Heavener (Definitive)
"Return To One" (with Silent Planet)	2025	Bloom In Heaven EP
