= Everchanger =

Studio album by Invent Animate
- Released: August 26, 2014
- Genre: Metalcore
- Length: 36:52
- Label: Tragic Hero
- Producers: Brian Hood; Jesse Cash

Invent Animate chronology
Waves (2012)	Everchanger (2014)	Stillworld (2016)

Singles from Everchanger
- 1. "Courier" Released: February 18, 2014; 2. "Native Intellect" Released: March 18, 2014; 3. "Nocturne: Lost Faith" Released: July 22, 2014; 4. "Naturehold" Released: August 12, 2014

Everchanger is the debut studio album by American metalcore band Invent Animate. The album was released on August 26, 2014, through Tragic Hero Records. It was produced by Brian Hood (Being as an Ocean, Gideon, The Crimson Armada) and Jesse Cash of Erra. The album is also the only and last to feature guitarist Logan Forrest before his departure from the band in late 2015.

== Promotion and release ==
The band filmed a music video for "Nocturne: Lost Faith" that was released on July 22, 2014. In an interview with Highwire Daze, vocalist Ben English discusses the background behind Everchanger

"The album really touches base on how the world constantly changes. You can't ever rely on one thing because everything constantly changes. No matter what you're doing in life. Everchanger is like a way of wrapping it all up into one thing and titling it. It touches all points of major changes that we go through and talks about all the different things I've personally been through and even some of the guys in the band."

== Critical reception ==
Professional ratings
Review scores
Source	Rating
New Transendence	9/10

New Transcendence gave the album an almost perfect score 9/10 and saying: "Feel the ebb and flow of nature pulsing through your headphones—plug in Everchanger and get completely lost. Invent Animate do wondrous job of inventing an immersive, engaging blend of hard-hitting heaviness and awe-inspiring atmosphere, and then animate it, bringing it to life as it takes root in the listener's head. While at times, English might find himself channeling Northlane too much, or the band might get lost in their own dynamic, that shouldn't stop the listener from enjoying all that Everchanger has to offer—and to witness a true game-changer in the process."

== Track listing ==
Everchanger track listing
No.	Title	Length
1.	"Sol"	3:49
2.	"Naturehold" (featuring Jesse Cash of Erra)	3:48
3.	"Nocturne: Lost Faith"	3:26
4.	"Courier"	3:38
5.	"Moon Phase"	3:30
6.	"Forest Haven"	3:12
7.	"The Desperate Are the Calm"	3:20
8.	"Native Intellect"	4:13
9.	"Half Life" (new version)	3:55
10.	"Luna"	3:55
Total length:		36:52

== Personnel ==
Invent Animate

- Ben English – lead vocals
- Keaton Goldwire – lead guitar
- Logan Forrest – rhythm guitar
- Caleb Sherraden – bass, backing vocals
- Trey Celaya – drums, backing vocals

Additional musicians

- Jesse Cash of Erra – guest vocals on track 2, production

Additional personnel

- Brian Hood – production, mixing, mastering, recording
- Kevin Newland – mixing, mastering, recording
- Glenn Thomas – illustration
