= Heavener (album) =

Studio album by Invent Animate
- Released: March 17, 2023
- Genre: Progressive metalcore
- Length: 46:17
- Label: UNFD
- Producer: Invent Animate; Landon Tewers

Invent Animate chronology
The Sun Sleeps, as If It Never Was (2021)	Heavener (2023)

Singles from Heavener
- 1. "Shade Astray" Released: June 30, 2022; 2. "Elysium" Released: November 8, 2022; 3. "Immolation of Night" Released: February 2, 2023; 4. "Without a Whisper" Released: March 14, 2023

Alternative cover
- "Heavener (Definitive)"

Heavener is the fourth studio album by American metalcore band Invent Animate, released on March 17, 2023, through UNFD. It was self-produced by the band and Landon Tewers of The Plot in You.

The album was preceded by four singles: "Shade Astray", "Elysium", "Immolation of Night", and "Without a Whisper". Invent Animate would tour extensively across in North America, Europe and Australia throughout 2023 in promotion of the album, concluding with a headlining North American tour with Australian and Swedish bands, Void of Vision, Thrown and Aviana respectively during Fall 2023.

A year following the album's release, the group would reissue, Heavener (Definitive), a deluxe version of the album with three new songs and a re-worked electronic version of "Without a Whisper" on May 31, 2024, via UNFD.

== Critical reception ==
Professional ratings
Review scores
Source	Rating
Distorted Sound	8/10
Kerrang!	3/5
Metal Storm	7.3/10
New Transendence	9/10
Sputnikmusic	4.7/5

The album received generally positive reviews from music critics. Distorted Sound scored the album 8 out of 10 and said: "It would be cheap of us to compare this album to the notions of Heaven and Hell. Slightly sacrilegious also. What Invent Animate deliver is an in depth examination of two of the most complex life lessons humanity can accost; grief and self-acceptance. The idea that nothing is permanent and learning to embrace that is something very few bands execute well. Yes, there are some stumbling blocks within Heavener, but on the whole, this is an album we implore everyone to listen to at least once, if only to draw an individual interpretation of life's experiences." Kerrang! gave the album 3 out of 5 and stated: "No question, Heavener is proof that Invent Animate remain one of the most compelling acts in progressive metalcore. It's just that the real intrigue lies in where they go next now they've left this baggage behind..."

New Transcendence gave the album a score of 9/10 and saying: "This might be an unpopular opinion, but Heavener feels like the first time Invent Animate have tried anything measurably different in several releases—if not ever. Largely, the album is a success, and with songs like 'Shade Astray', 'Void Surfacing' and 'Emberglow' it really isn't a surprise. If anything, Invent Animate are victims to their own immense success, as Heavener only stutters in the context of their own discography, but overall remains an incredibly strong listening experience in its own right. The takeaway? Invent Animate remain at the top of the progressive metalcore food chain, and Heavener opens up a huge number of new directions for the band to expand into next."

== Track listing ==
Heavener track listing
No.	Title	Length
1.	"Absence Persistent"	3:49
2.	"Shade Astray"	4:35
3.	"Labyrinthine"	3:43
4.	"Without a Whisper"	4:17
5.	"False Meridian"	5:00
6.	"Reverie"	3:10
7.	"Immolation of Night"	3:50
8.	"Purity Weeps"	4:08
9.	"Void Surfacing"	4:30
10.	"Emberglow"	4:21
11.	"Elysium"	4:48
Total length:		46:17

Heavener (Definitive) deluxe edition
No.	Title	Length
12.	"Sleepless Deathbed"	3:58
13.	"How We Used To Say Goodbye"	3:53
14.	"Heavener"	4:30
15.	"Without a Whisper" (Reimagined)	3:44
Total length:		16:06

== Personnel ==
Credits adapted from the album's liner notes, ASCAP and BMI.

Invent Animate

- Marcus Vik – lead vocals, production, engineering
- Keaton Goldwire – guitar, production, engineering
- Caleb Sherraden – bass guitar, production, engineering
- Trey Celaya – drums (tracks 1–11), guitar, production, engineering
- Brody Taylor Smith – drums (tracks 12–14) production (track 15)

Additional personnel

- Daniel Braunstein – mixing, mastering
- Landon Tewers – additional production
- Hayden Clay Williams – artwork (standard)
- Gavin Sykes – artwork (definitive)
