= Set the Sun =

Set The Sun

EP by Set The Sun
- Released: May 31, 2011
- Genres: Metalcore; electronicore; progressive metalcore; post-hardcore
- Length: 18:03

Set The Sun chronology
Set The Sun (2011)	Desolate (2011)

Singles from Set The Sun
- 1. "No Knives For Nathan" Released: April 10, 2011

Professional ratings
Review scores
Source	Rating
That's Rocking Awesome	3.5/5 stars
Sputnik Music	4.8/5 stars

Set The Sun is the debut EP by American punk rock band Set The Sun, released on May 31, 2011.

== Background ==
Set The Sun was formed in 2009 by David Southern at the age of 17 in Dallas, Texas. Southern began writing songs solo before enlisting the help of Nate Anderson, Arturo Pina, Dakota Price, Brandon Daniels and Alex Summers in early 2010. The band began writing music and playing shows, before entering the studio in early 2011 to record their debut.

Set The Sun then released their first single on April 10, 2011, entitled No Knives For Nathan.

Following No Knives For Nathan, on May 31, 2011 Set The Sun was officially released.

== Music ==
With Set The Sun the band uses elements of metalcore, electronicore, post-hardcore, progressive metalcore and heavy metal and has been compared to acts such as Attack Attack!, Asking Alexandria, August Burns Red, Architects, The Devil Wears Prada, The Word Alive, We Came as Romans and Woe, Is Me.

John Stokedton Vs The State Of Gnarnia has been called progressive metalcore and compared to Architects and No Knives For Nathan has been compared to Avenged Sevenfold, Black Veil Brides, Asking Alexandria, All That Remains, Killswitch Engage and Death.

Additionally, this EP was hailed for instrumentation on vocals, keyboard and drums however panned for its use of "Basic and generic guitar parts and practically inaudible bass."

== Track listing ==
No.	Title	Length
1.	"Peladophobia"	3:45
2.	"Mojo Groove"	3:21
3.	"John Stokedton Vs The State Of Gnarnia"	2:43
4.	"D.I.L.L.I.G.A.F."	4:09
5.	"No Knives For Nathan"	4:05
Total length:		18:03

== Personnel ==
- Nate Anderson - unclean vocals
- David Southern - clean vocals, rhythm guitar
- Arturo Pina - lead guitar
- Dakota Price - bass guitar
- Brandon Daniels - keyboards
- Alex Summers - drums
