= Happiness in Self Destruction =

Studio album by The Plot in You
- Released: October 16, 2015
- Recorded: 2013–2015
- Genre: Metalcore
- Length: 57:52
- Label: StaySick
- Producer: Landon Tewers; Josh Schroeder

The Plot in You chronology
Could You Watch Your Children Burn (2013)	Happiness in Self Destruction (2015)	Dispose (2018)

Singles from Happiness in Self Destruction
- 1. "My Old Ways" Released: February 23, 2015; 2. "Take Me Away" Released: August 28, 2015; 3. "Dear Old Friend" Released: October 2, 2015

Happiness in Self Destruction is the third studio album by American metalcore band The Plot in You. The album was released on October 16, 2015. It is the band's first and only album released through StaySick after leaving Rise Records.

== Background ==
The album's release was preceded by three singles, "My Old Ways", "Take Me Away", and "Dear Old Friend". A music video for "Take Me Away" was released, as well as a music video for "Time Changes Everything", released in June 2016.

Landon Tewers recorded the album in his home studio over two and a half years. He played every instrument on the album. Producer Josh Schroeder assisted in all post-production, as well as writing the drum tracks.

== Critical reception ==
Professional ratings
Review scores
Source	Rating
Ghost Cult	7/10
It Djents	9/10
KillYourStereo	85/100
New Fury Media	7/10
Pure Grain Audio	8/10
Sputnikmusic	3/5 stars
Ultimate Guitar	8/10

Happiness in Self Destruction received generally positive reviews. Sputnikmusic gave the album 3 out of 5, stating "Happiness in Self Destruction is Landon's most mature and intensely personal record yet, and those factors work in its favor. However, it's also self-absorbed, overlong, and lacks cohesion." It Djents gave the album 9 out of 10, stating "The band is giving us fifteen songs of honest and emotional music, that shows a lot of ambition. You can clearly hear and feel the emotions and the love, that was put into this record. There are many interesting details and a lot of things to be discovered, but overall they do have a concept."

== Track listing ==
All lyrics are written by Landon Tewers; all music is composed by Landon Tewers.

No.	Title	Length
1.	"Hole in the Wall"	3:01
2.	"Dear Old Friend"	3:59
3.	"Take Me Away"	3:40
4.	"Runaway"	3:28
5.	"Pillhead"	3:55
6.	"Better Vibes"	4:12
7.	"My Old Ways"	3:59
8.	"Die Like Your Brothers"	3:24
9.	"Mind Controlled"	2:54
10.	"Time Changes Everything"	3:53
11.	"Living Your Dream"	2:23
12.	"A Song About Myself"	3:44
13.	"Forgive Me"	4:21
14.	"Washed Up"	3:46
15.	"Happiness in Self Destruction"	7:08
Total length:		57:52

Note: After the closing title track, there is roughly a minute of silence.

== Personnel ==
Credits adapted from AllMusic.

The Plot in You

- Landon Tewers – vocals, guitars, bass, engineering, production
- Mathis Arnell – drums

Additional personnel

- Josh Schroeder – mixing, mastering, drum programming, percussion, production
- Josh Childress – design, layout
- Paige Farrow – cover photo, photography

== Charts ==
Chart (2015)	Peak position
US Billboard 200	102
US Top Rock Albums (Billboard)	13
US Top Hard Rock Albums (Billboard)	5
US Independent Albums (Billboard)	12
US Heatseekers Albums (Billboard)	1
