= The Sun Sleeps, as If It Never Was =

EP by Invent Animate
- Released: September 23, 2021
- Length: 10:32
- Label: UNFD
- Producer: Invent Animate; Ryan Len Johnson

Invent Animate chronology
Greyview (2020)	The Sun Sleeps, as If It Never Was (2021)	Heavener (2023)

Singles from The Sun Sleeps, as If It Never Was
- 1. "The Sun Sleeps" Released: September 9, 2021

The Sun Sleeps, as If It Never Was is the second EP by American metalcore band Invent Animate. It was released on September 23, 2021, through UNFD. The EP was self-produced by the band and Ryan Len Johnson. It is the band's first release with the label. A music video was made for the entire three-track EP.

== Critical reception ==
Professional ratings
Review scores
Source	Rating
Sputnikmusic	5/5
Wall of Sound	9/10

The EP received generally positive reviews from critics. Wall of Sound gave the album a score 9/10 and saying: "Invent Animate have given us an EP that is quite dark in nature yet beautifully honest. They have presented us with similar sounds to their previous album as well newly refined features that are shaping the newest era of the band."

== Track listing ==
The Sun Sleeps, as If It Never Was track listing
No.	Title	Length
1.	"The Sun Sleeps"	4:14
2.	","	1:23
3.	"As If It Never Was"	4:54
Total length:		10:32

== Personnel ==
Invent Animate

- Marcus Vik – lead vocals
- Keaton Goldwire – lead guitar
- Caleb Sherraden – bass, backing vocals
- Trey Celaya – drums, rhythm guitar, backing vocals

Additional personnel

- Invent Animate – production
- Ryan Len Johnson – production
- Jim Hughes – artwork
