= Stillworld (album) =

Studio album by Invent Animate
- Released: July 8, 2016
- Genre: Metalcore; progressive metalcore
- Length: 37:59
- Label: Tragic Hero
- Producer: Will Putney; Randy LeBoeuf

Invent Animate chronology
Everchanger (2014)	Stillworld (2016)	Greyview (2020)

Singles from Stillworld
- 1. "Darkbloom" Released: October 29, 2015; 2. "Celestial Floods" Released: May 19, 2016; 3. "White Wolf" Released: June 24, 2016

Stillworld is the second studio album by American metalcore band Invent Animate. The album was released on July 8, 2016, through Tragic Hero Records. It was produced by Will Putney and Randy LeBoeuf.

Professional ratings
Review scores
Source	Rating
New Noise	(4/5)
New Transendence	(9.5/10)

== Track listing ==
No.	Title	Length
1.	"Indigo"	4:15
2.	"Agora"	3:51
3.	"White Wolf"	3:29
4.	"Celestial Floods"	4:04
5.	"Solace"	3:25
6.	"Dead Roots"	3:41
7.	"Vacant"	3:36
8.	"Midnight Hymn"	3:17
9.	"Darkbloom"	4:00
10.	"Soul Sleep"	4:17
Total length:		37:59

== Personnel ==
Invent Animate

- Ben English – lead vocals
- Keaton Goldwire – lead guitar
- Caleb Sherraden – bass, backing vocals
- Trey Celaya – drums, rhythm guitar, backing vocals

Additional personnel

- Will Putney and Randy LeBoeuf – production
