= Desolate (EP) =

EP by Set The Sun
- Released: September 21, 2011
- Genres: Metalcore; electronicore; post-hardcore; deathcore
- Length: 9:43

Set The Sun chronology
Set the Sun (2011)	Desolate (2011)	Aren't You Glad? (2016)

Singles from Desolate
- 1. "Desolate" Released: September 21, 2011; 2. "Father Said" Released: August 15, 2012; 3. "The Prince" Released: July 11, 2013

Professional ratings
Review scores
Source	Rating
That's Rocking Awesome	8.5/10 stars

Desolate is the second studio EP by American punk rock band Set The Sun, released on September 21, 2011.

== Music ==
With Desolate Set The Sun has been stated to incorporate elements of post-hardcore, metalcore, electronicore, deathcore, hardcore punk and southern hardcore leading to them being compared to the likes of Wage War, August Burns Red Bring Me the Horizon, Chelsea Grin and Whitechapel.

Father Said has been praised for its infection hooks and compared to Bring Me the Horizon's Happy Song, whereas The Prince has been called deathcore and praised for being "maintaining its heaviness, even when melodic".

Additionally, the band have been able to mature their sound by pushing its synths into the background, improving lead guitar work and relying less on chugging.

== Track listing ==
No.	Title	Length
1.	"Desolate"	2:39
2.	"Father Said"	3:14
3.	"The Prince"	3:50
Total length:		09:43

== Personnel ==
- Nate Anderson - unclean vocals
- David Southern - clean vocals, rhythm guitar
- Arturo Pina - lead guitar
- Dakota Price - bass guitar
- Brandon Daniels - keyboards
- Alex Summers - drums
