= Greyview =

Studio album by Invent Animate
- Released: March 13, 2020
- Studio: Graphic Nature Audio, Belleville, New Jersey, U.S.
- Genre: Metalcore; progressive metalcore
- Length: 49:14
- Label: Tragic Hero
- Producer: Randy LeBoeuf

Invent Animate chronology
Stillworld (2016)	Greyview (2020)	The Sun Sleeps, as If It Never Was (2021)

Singles from Greyview
- 1. "Cloud Cascade" Released: November 8, 2019; 2. "Dark" Released: January 24, 2020; 3. "Halcyon" Released: February 14, 2020; 4. "Monarch" Released: February 28, 2020

Greyview is the third studio album by American metalcore band Invent Animate. The album was released on March 13, 2020, through Tragic Hero Records and was produced by Randy LeBoeuf. It is the band's last release to be published on this label before the band signed to UNFD in 2021.

== Critical reception ==
Professional ratings
Review scores
Source	Rating
KillYourStereo	4/5
New Transendence	10/10
Sputnikmusic	4.5/5

KillYourStereo gave the album 4 out of 5 and said: "Greyview is a wonderful, sometimes remarkable comeback for Invent Animate, often featuring some of the American band's best work. Track after track, this new album punishes the listener with the crushing, heavyweight of sorrow and depression, felt in both the gut-wrenching lyrical wordplay and the moody prog-metalcore instrumentals. While it may not be the band's most cohesive sounding effort, (like their 2016 album, Stillworld), it nonetheless makes for a new monument in the discography of Invent Animate, cementing its place as an air-tight and very enjoyable, if not occasionally difficult listen. While there isn't much in the way of musical progression happening over Greyview, it is quite easy to see that Invent Animate are in a place where they are confident, calm and comfortable once again. This LP has a hint of familiarity without ever feeling too stagnant and too old, reminding me as to why I first fell in love with this band. This being said, I do hope to see some further progression to the sound of Invent Animate with future releases, and am also looking forward to whatever comes next in the now-stable world of Invent Animate. It's good to have 'em back!"

New Transcendence gave the album a perfect score 10/10 and saying: "As someone who has kept up with Invent Animate since Waves, I knew I was going to like Greyview, but I have a confession—I didn't think I would put it at the same level as Stillworld. While the band has established a primitive trend of one-upping their previous releases with each new record, the amount of type and hype surrounding Greyview's unveiling led me to believe it wouldn't hit me the same way. I've honestly never been happier to admit I was wrong. Greyview doesn't just one-up Stillworld, it makes it look like child's play. Everything there is to love about Invent Animate has been distilled, concentrated and re-expounded upon ten thousand fold throughout Greyview's near-hour duration. Heavier than ever before, yet all the more beautiful and captivating, Invent Animate have contributed a record I consider to be a bastion of progressive metalcore—a record that not only all others in the genre will be compared against, but a record that brings life and—yeah, color—to heavy music as a whole. "

== Track listing ==
Greyview track listing
No.	Title	Length
1.	"Dark"	5:04
2.	"Cloud Cascade"	4:09
3.	"Reflection Room"	3:50
4.	"Hollow Light"	3:58
5.	"Shapeshifter" (featuring Garrett Russell of Silent Planet)	3:45
6.	"Heaven, Alone"	1:34
7.	"Monarch"	3:41
8.	"Fireside"	4:25
9.	"Secret Sun"	3:22
10.	"Eden"	4:07
11.	"Brightwing"	3:15
12.	"Halcyon"	3:39
13.	"Nova"	4:19
Total length:		49:14

== Personnel ==
Invent Animate

- Marcus Vik – lead vocals
- Keaton Goldwire – lead guitar
- Caleb Sherraden – bass, backing vocals
- Trey Celaya – drums, rhythm guitar, backing vocals

Additional musicians

- Garrett Russell of Silent Planet – guest vocals on track 5

Additional personnel

- Randy LeBoeuf – production, engineering, mixing
- Ryan Len Johnson – additional production, engineering, mixing
- Jesse Cash – additional production
- Christopher Ridley – mastering
- Aaron Marsh – cover art
- Daniel Wagner – logo design
