= Revision:Revise =

Studio album by A Bullet for Pretty Boy
- Released: November 9, 2010
- Genre: Metalcore, post-hardcore, electronicore
- Length: 41:22
- Label: Razor & Tie, Artery
- Producer: Cameron Mizell

A Bullet for Pretty Boy chronology
Beauty in the Eyes of the Beholder (2008)	Revision:Revise (2010)	Symbiosis (2012)

Revision:Revise is the first studio album from A Bullet for Pretty Boy. Razor & Tie alongside Artery Recordings released the album on November 9, 2010.

== Critical reception ==
Professional ratings
Review scores
Source	Rating
AbsolutePunk	7.0/10
HM Magazine	4/5 stars
Indie Vision Music	3/5 stars
Mind Equal Blown	7.5/10
The New Review	2.5/5 stars

Awarding the album four stars from HM Magazine, Doug Van Pelt states, "ABFPB have all the ingredients for intense fun: excellent, tight drumming; killer guitars; high, clean vocals, growls and chant-along gang vocals." Ryan Gardner, rating the album a seven out of ten for AbsolutePunk, writes, " Full of energy and passion, Revision:Revise is a true fire breather from start to finish." Giving the album a seven and a half out of ten, Sebastian Fonseca says, "Revision: Revise has restored my faith in many ways." Steve, awarding the album three stars by Indie Vision Music, describes, "this is a very solid album." Giving the album two and a half stars at The New Review, Josh Velliquette says, "It's time to put the crayons down."

== Track listing ==
All tracks are written by A Bullet for Pretty Boy

Track listing
No.	Title	Length
1.	"The Deceiver"	3:52
2.	"Revision:Revise"	3:53
3.	"Decisions"	3:32
4.	"Patterns"	3:41
5.	"Only Time Will Tell"	4:37
6.	"Voices & Vessels"	4:23
7.	"Tides"	3:16
8.	"Windows"	4:38
9.	"Vita Nova"	3:16
10.	"I Will Destroy the Wisdom of the Wise (feat. Tyler Carter)"	6:14
Total length:		41:22

== Personnel ==
A Bullet for Pretty Boy line-up

- Danon Saylor – unclean vocals
- Chris Johnston – lead guitar
- Derrick Sechrist – rhythm guitar, clean vocals
- Taylor Kimball – bass guitar
- Josh Modisette – keyboards, backing vocals
- Jared Easterling – drums

Additional musicians

- Tyler Carter – additional vocals on track 10

Production

- Produced by Cameron Mizell @ Chango Studios
