= Locus (Satyr album) =

Studio album by Satyr
- Released: February 21, 2020
- Length: 35:37
- Producer: Corey Bautista

Satyr chronology
Neutrino! (2018)	Locus (2020)	Totem (2022)

Singles from Locus
- 1. "Picayune" Released: January 10, 2020; 2. "Bird" Released: February 7, 2020; 3. "Aesop" Released: March 6, 2020

Locus is the debut studio album by American progressive, post-hardcore band, Satyr, released independently on February 21, 2021.

== Track listing ==
No.	Title	Length
1.	"Apogee"	3:07
2.	"Perigee"	3:28
3.	"Aesop"	3:31
4.	"Bird"	3:11
5.	"Not to Scale"	3:56
6.	"Mushroom"	3:03
7.	"Pathing"	3:33
8.	"Levitator"	3:24
9.	"Picayune"	3:51
10.	"Null"	4:30
Total length:		35:37

== Personnel ==
- Michael "Soup" Campbell – scream vocals, guitar, production
- Janald "JD" Long – clean vocals, guitar
- Calvin "Dolphin" Cox - bass guitar
- Brody Taylor Smith – drums, percussion, production

Technical

- Corey Bautista – producer, mixing, engineering
- Kris Crummett - mastering
- Jason 'Slumberspeak" Gardinier - art direction
