= A Bullet for Pretty Boy (band) =

American metalcore band

- Origin: Longview, Texas, U.S.
- Genres: Metalcore; post-hardcore; electronicore
- Years active: 2006–2015
- Labels: Razor & Tie, Artery
- Spinoffs: Nothing Left
- Past members: Danon Saylor; Chris Johnston; Josh Modisette; Derrick Sechrist; Jared Easterling; Taylor Kimball; Bryan Bingham; Bryan Roe; Josh Trammel; Scott Carter; Christian Sanchez
- Website: facebook.com/abulletforprettyboy

A Bullet for Pretty Boy was an American metalcore band from Longview, Texas. Formed in 2006, the band independently released the EP Beauty in the Eyes of the Beholder (2008) before signing to Razor & Tie and Artery Recordings, where they released the studio albums Revision:Revise (2010) and Symbiosis (2012). The group went on hiatus in 2015; vocalist Danon Saylor subsequently joined with members of For Today and Silent Planet to form the supergroup Nothing Left.

== History ==
A Bullet for Pretty Boy formed in Longview, Texas in 2006, with members having previously played in other local bands. Contrary to early misconceptions that the group's name was homophobic, it was in fact taken from the 1970 film of the same name, a biopic of gangster Pretty Boy Floyd, as the members resonated with its message about the futility of revenge. The band's lineup as of June 2015 consisted of vocalist Danon Saylor, guitarist Chris Johnston, and vocalist/keyboardist Josh Modisette, and had previously included vocalist/guitarist Derrick Sechrist, bassists Bryan Bingham and Taylor Kimball, and drummer Josh Trammel.

The band debuted with the self-released EP Beauty in the Eyes of the Beholder, released on March 8, 2008, They subsequently signed to Razor & Tie and Artery Recordings, where they released their debut studio album, Revision:Revise, on November 9, 2010. Their second studio album, Symbiosis, was released on the same labels on July 31, 2012.

== Musical style ==
A Bullet for Pretty Boy was primarily identified as metalcore, post-hardcore, melodic hardcore, and screamo. Alternative Press noted that Josh Modisette's keyboard work on Symbiosis gave the band's songs a "Deftones-ish depth". In a 2009 interview with Indie Vision Music, guitarist Chris Johnston described the band's sound as "a mix of hardcore breakdowns, progressive / ambience, and catchy choruses," and listed Underoath, early As Cities Burn, August Burns Red, and Circa Survive as the group's main influences.

== Members ==
=== Former ===
- Danon Saylor – unclean vocals (2007–2015)
- Chris Johnston – lead guitar, backing vocals (2006–2015)
- Josh Modisette – keyboards, backing and later clean vocals (2006–2015)
- Derrick Sechrist – rhythm guitar, clean vocals (2006–2011)
- Jared Easterling – drums (2010–2011)
- Taylor Kimball – bass guitar (2010–2011)
- Bryan Bingham – bass guitar (2008–2010)
- Kasey Moore – bass guitar (2006–2008)
- Josh Trammel – drums, clean vocals (2006–2010)
- Scott Carter – unclean vocals (2006–2007)

==== Touring ====
- Zane Callister – rhythm guitar (2012–2015)
- Patrick Little – bass guitar (2012–2015)
- William Steffen – drums (2012–2015)
- Garrett Jensen – drums (2011)
- Christian Sanchez – drums (2011)

== Discography ==
=== Studio albums ===
- Revision:Revise (November 9, 2010, Razor & Tie/Artery)
- Symbiosis (July 31, 2012, Razor & Tie/Artery)

=== EPs ===
Released in 2008, Beauty In The Eyes Of The Beholder was the first release by the band. It was self produced by the band

Beauty In The Eyes Of The Beholder
| No. | Title | Length |
|---|---|---|
| 1. | "Dial M For Murder" | 3:40 |
| 2. | "Bears, Beets, Battlestar Galactica" | 4:12 |
| 3. | "The Hope I Confide In" | 3:29 |
| 4. | "And Still You Chose Surrender" | 1:30 |
| 5. | "Pale Horse" | 2:30 |
| 6. | "Beauty In The Eyes Of The Beholder" | 3:28 |
| Total length: | | 18:49 |
