= The White Noise =

American punk rock band

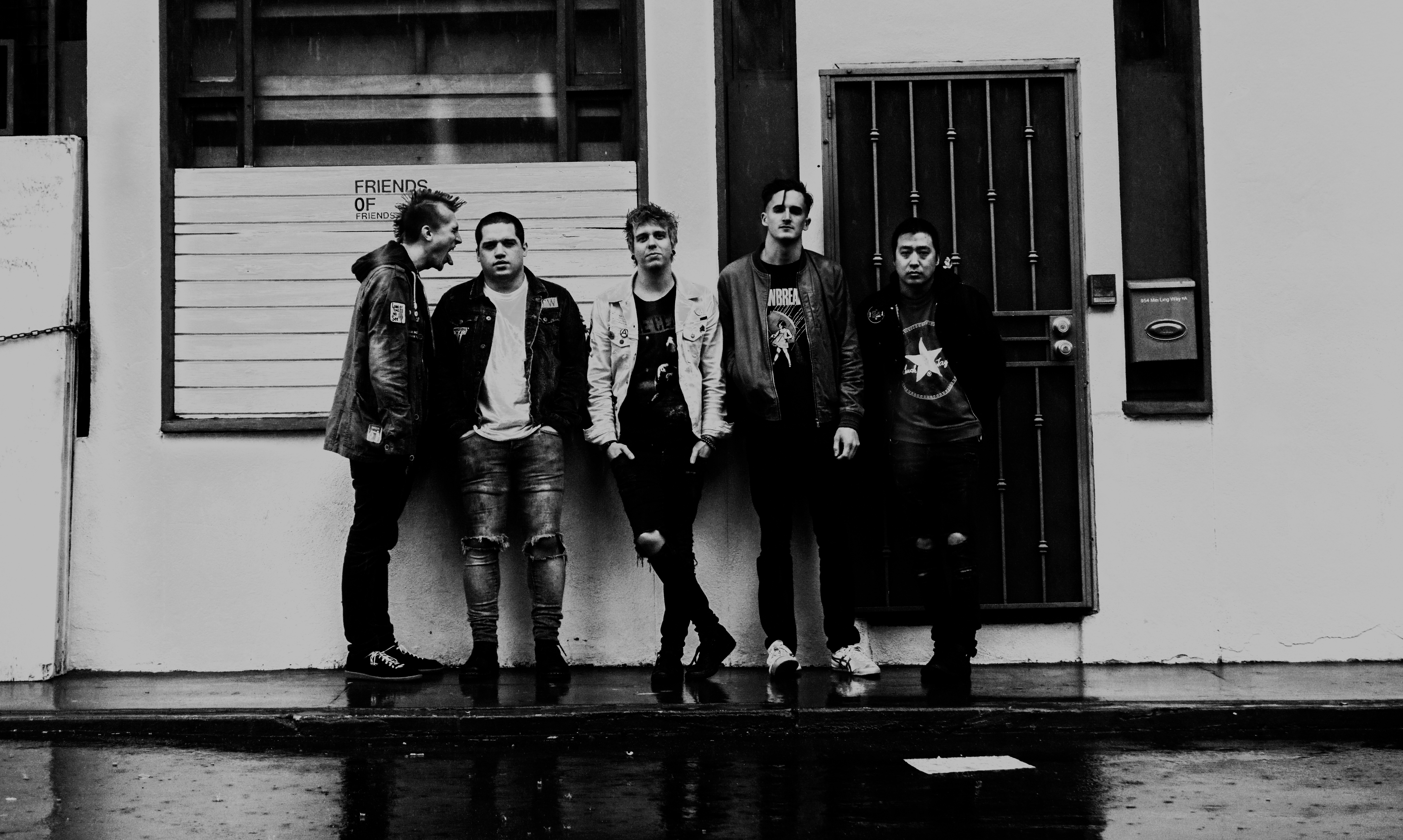
- The White Noise in 2017

Background information
- Also known as: Set the Sun (2010–2015)
- Origin: Dallas, Texas, U.S.
- Genres: Punk rock; post-hardcore; hardcore punk; melodic hardcore; industrial punk; metalcore (early)
- Years active: 2010–2018
- Label: Fearless
- Spinoffs: UnityTX
- Past members: David Southern; Shawn Walker; Josh "KJ" Strock; Bailey Crego; Tommy West; Nate Anderson; Arturo Pina; Dakota Price; Brandon Daniels; Alex Summers; Kendrick Nicholson; Landon Jett
- Website: www.thewhitenoiseband.com

The White Noise was an American punk rock band from Dallas, Texas, later based in Los Angeles, California. Formed in 2010 under the name Set the Sun by guitarist and vocalist David Southern and drummer Alex Summers, the band released two EPs and a series of singles while still based in Dallas. By 2013, Southern was left the sole founding member and recruited vocalist Shawn Walker and guitarist Josh "KJ" Strock. This lineup would relocate to Los Angeles and change their name to the White Noise. In total, the band released three EPs, in addition to one studio album, 2017's AM/PM.

== History ==
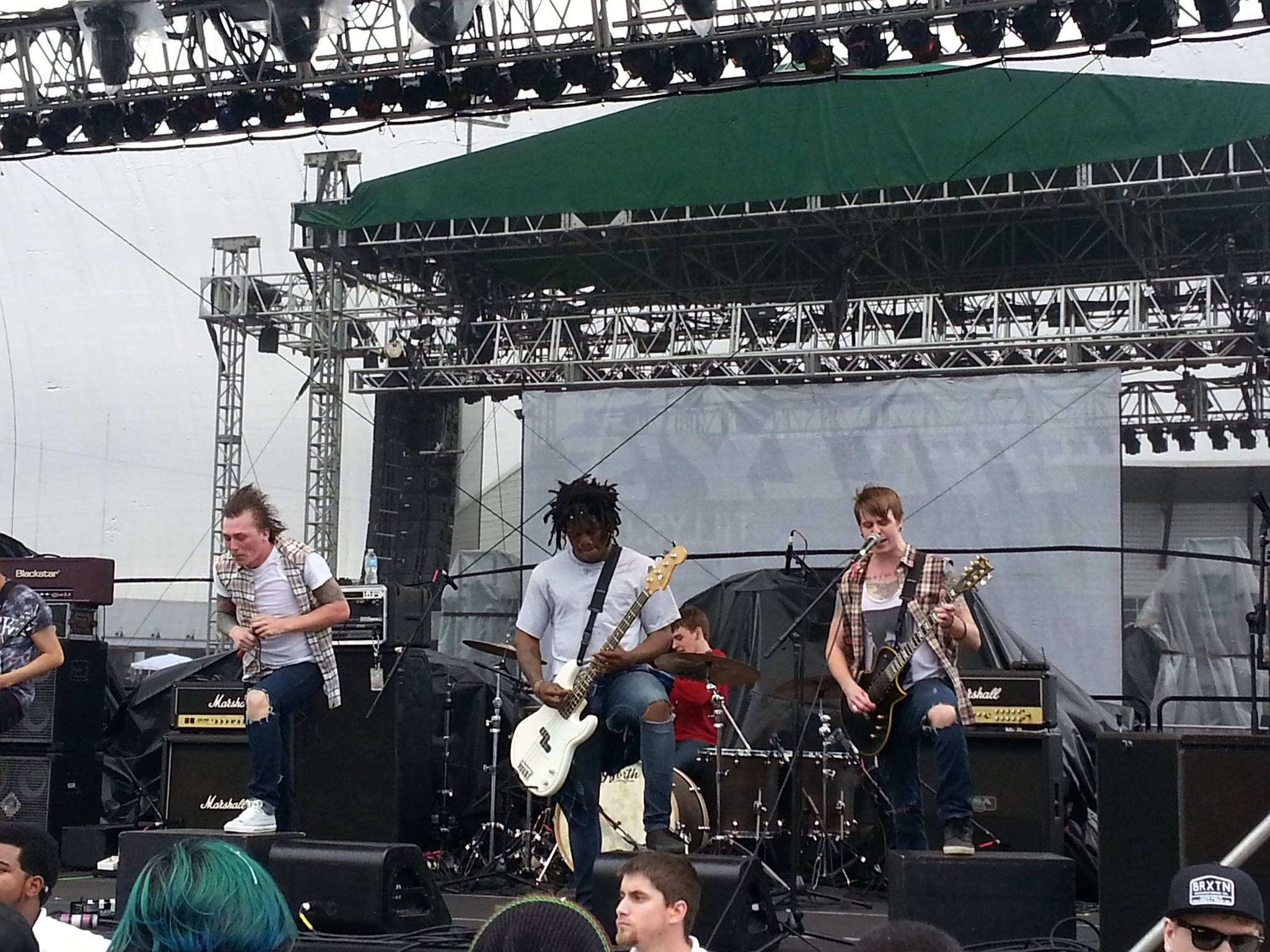
Set the Sun performing in 2014; from left to right: Josh Strock, Shawn Walker, Kendrick Nicholson, Landon Jett, David Southern

=== 2009–2014: Formation, Set the Sun and Desolate ===
Set The Sun was formed in 2010 by David Southern and Alex Summers at the ages of 17 in Dallas, Texas. Southern and Summers began playing music together before enlisting the help of Nate Anderson, Arturo Pina, Dakota Price and Brandon Daniels in early 2010. Set The Sun entered the studio in late 2010 before releasing their debut EP Set the Sun in early 2011. Set The Sun continued this style into their second release Desolate recorded in early 2011 and released later that year. In early 2012, Set The Sun release two singles days apart, the first "Armagetiton" continuing their metalcore style and the second "Mishaps" being an acoustic ballad using only Southern's clean vocals. On August 15, 2012, they released the single "Father Said".

In the following years, every member of the band with the exception of Southern would depart, however he began building a new lineup with musicians he had met at a local recording studio. By 2013, the band consisted of Southern on guitar and clean vocals, Shawn Walker on unclean vocals, Josh "KJ" Strock on guitar, Kendrick Nicholson on bass and Landon Jett on drums, who would soon begin preparing to record their debut full-length album. On July 11, 2013, they released the single "The Prince", which was followed on December 25, 2013, by "Expectations", and on February 16, 2014, by "The Ghost of John Stokedton". At this time, Southern also guested on post-hardcore band Coronet's debut EP, The Greater of Two Fires. The same year, the Jett and Nicholson departed from the band, and their roles were filled by Bailey Crego and Tommy West. Around this time, the band became disheartened with their metalcore style, explaining in an interview with OC Weekly that "No one listens to metalcore in this band really... But it was a huge scene where we were, and it was the only scene. If you didn’t play it, you had a very tough time getting booked". This led to the band relocating to Los Angeles, changing their name to the White Noise and beginning to pursue a different musical style.

=== 2015–2018: Relocation, Aren't you Glad? and AM/PM ===
In early 2015, the newly christened band the White Noise signed to Fearless Records, before releasing the single "Bloom", on August 13. Their following single "Red Eye Lids" then released on October 21. On January 30, 2016, the band announced that their EP Aren't You Glad would be released on February 26. The release coincided with the release of the EP's third single "Picture Day". Between April 15 and May 21, 2016, the band opened for Enter Shikari on their United States headline tour alongside Hands Like Houses. On May 11, 2017, they announced the release of their debut album, accompanied by the album's lead single "Bite Marks". The album's second single "All the Best Songs are Dead" was then released on June 2, before the album, AM/PM, was officially released on June 23, 2017. In 2018, the ensemble toured with Anti-Flag, Stray from the Path and Sharptooth. On November 2, 2018, the band announced their final show that occurred on December 15, 2018.

== Musical style ==
The White Noise were a punk rock band. Specifically, they played styles such as post-hardcore, melodic hardcore and hardcore punk. Some of their songs include elements of industrial and ambient music, leading to the categorizations of industrial punk and ambient hardcore. Their music made use of detuned guitars, elements of noise music and contrasting screamed and sung vocals. Cryptic Rock writer Jeanie Blue described them as blending "the intensity of Hardcore Punk with something that leans more heavily toward Metalcore [sic], and create a sound that is truly unique and full of blistering honesty".

While known as Set the Sun, they played metalcore.

They have cited musical influences including Rancid, Nine Inch Nails, Underoath, Brand New, Give up the Ghost, Converge, AFI, Jawbreaker, the Used, the Hope Conspiracy, the Suicide File, Misfits, Sex Pistols, Polar Bear Club, Sum 41, Green Day, Blink 182, Jimmy Eat World, the Replacements, Weezer, Third Eye Blind, Goo Goo Dolls, Royal Blood, Foo Fighters, Nirvana, Hum, Slipknot and the Feds.

== Members ==
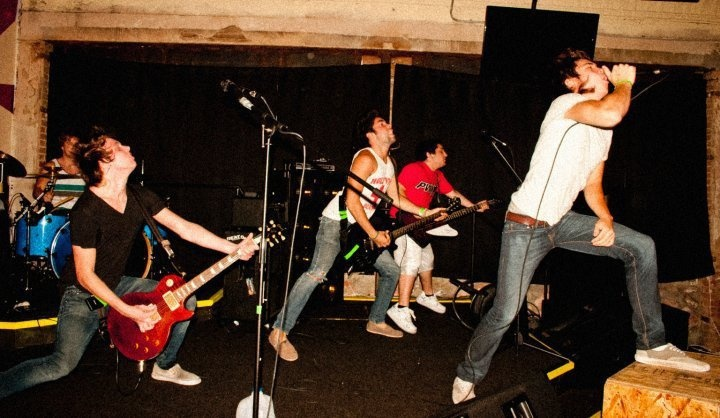
Set the Sun live in 2011

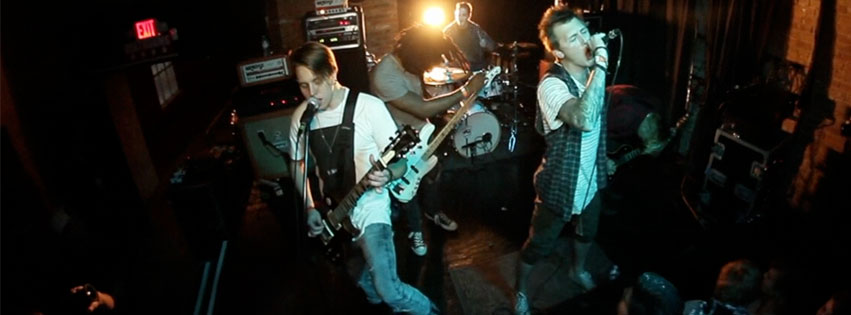
Set the Sun performing in 2013

Final members

- David Southern – clean vocals (2009–2018), rhythm guitar (2009-2016), keyboard (2013–2018), bass (2016–2018)
- Shawn Walker – unclean vocals (2013–2018), clean vocals (2017–2018) bass (2012)
- Josh "KJ" Strock – lead guitar, keyboard (2013–2018)
- Bailey Crego – bass (2014–2016), backing vocals (2014–2018), rhythm guitar (2016–2018)
- Tommy West – drums (2014–2018)

=== Past members ===
- Nate Anderson – unclean vocals (2010–2013)
- Arturo Pina – lead guitar (2010–2013)
- Dakota Price – bass, clean vocals (2010–2012)
- Kendrick Nicholson – bass, backing vocals (2013–2014)
- Alex Summers – drums (2009–2013)
- Landon Jett – drums (2013–2014)
- Brandon Daniels – keyboard (2010–2013)

== Discography ==
=== As the White Noise ===
Albums

Title	Album details
AM/PM	Released: 2017; Label: Fearless Records

EPs

Title	Album details
Aren't You Glad?	Released: 2016; Label: Fearless Records

Singles

Title	Details
Bloom	Released: 2015; Label: Fearless Records
Red Eye Lids	Released: 2015; Label: Fearless Records
Picture Day	Released: 2016; Label: Fearless Records
Bite Marks	Released: 2017; Label: Fearless Records
The Best Songs are Dead	Released: 2017; Label: Fearless Records

=== As Set the Sun ===
EPs

Title	Album details
Set the Sun	Released: 2011; Label: Self-Released
Desolate	Released: 2011; Label: Self-Released

Singles

Title	Details
No Knives For Nathan	Released: 2011; Label: Self-Released
Armagetiton	Released: 2012; Label: Self-Released
Mishaps	Released: 2012; Label: Self-Released
Father Said	Released: 2012; Label: Self-Released
The Prince	Released: 2013; Label: Self-Released
The Temptress	Released: 2013; Label: Self-Released
Expectations	Released: 2014; Label: Self-Released
The Ghost of John Stokedton	Released: 2014; Label: Self-Released

The White Noise discography
- Studio albums: 1
- EPs: 3
- Singles: 10
- Music videos: 13

=== Music videos ===
Title	Year
"Armagetiton"	2012
"Expectations"	2013
"The Ghost of John Stokedton"	2014
"Bloom"	2015
"Red Eye Lids"	2015
"Picture Day"	2016
"Cosmopolitician" (Live Video)	2016
"Bite Marks"	2017
"The Best Songs are Dead"	2017
"I Lost my Mind (In California)"	2017
