= Landon Tewers =

American musician

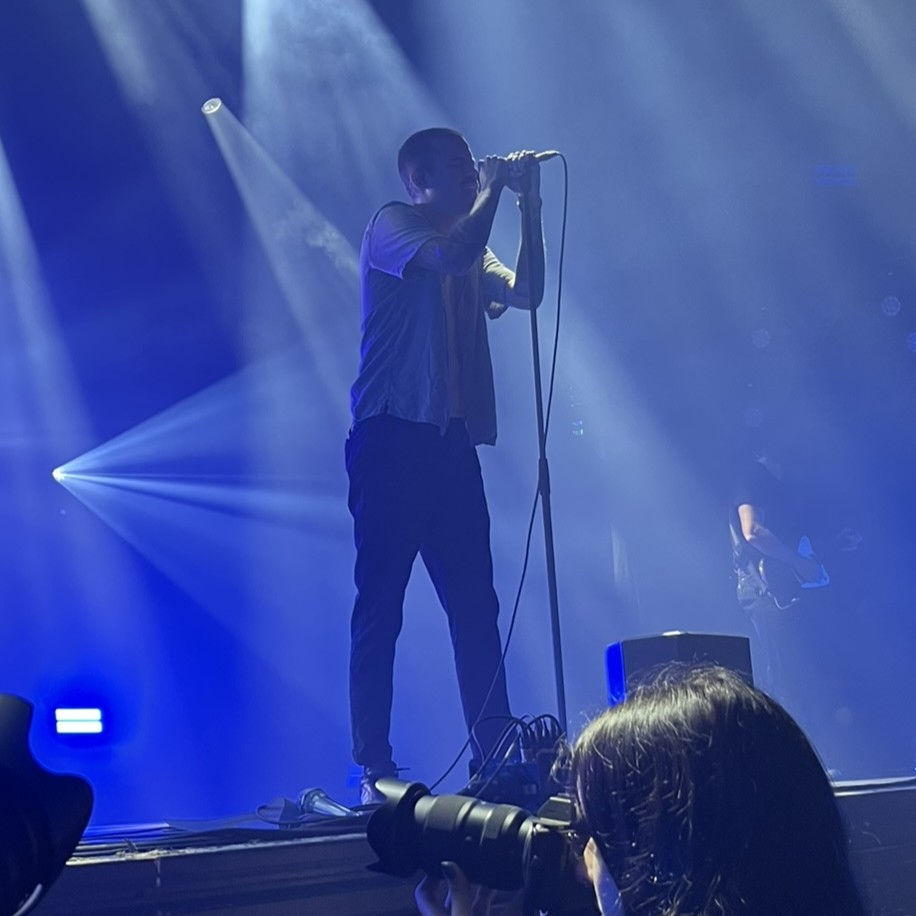
- Landon performing live in Tilburg in 2024

Background information
- Born: Landon Khale Tewers; September 27, 1989 (age 37); Findlay, Ohio, U.S.
- Genres: Metalcore; post-hardcore; alternative rock; emo; pop; hip-hop
- Occupations: Musician; singer; songwriter; producer
- Instruments: Vocals; keyboards; programming; guitar; bass; drums; percussion
- Years active: 2008–present
- Member of: The Plot in You
- Formerly of: Before Their Eyes
- Spouse: Madison Rose Tewers (m. 2018)
- Website: landontewers.com

Landon Khale Tewers (born September 27, 1989) is an American musician born in Findlay, Ohio. He is best known for being founder, producer and the lead vocalist of the metalcore band The Plot in You and for his self-titled solo project. He is a former member of the post-hardcore band Before Their Eyes, where he was the rhythm guitarist and unclean vocalist.

== Career ==
Tewers joined Before Their Eyes in 2008. While in the band, he started a side project named Vessels, which was later renamed to The Plot In You. Landon was part of the band during the release of the second and third albums "The Dawn of My Death" and "Untouchable". After this album, Tewers left the band to put his focus on his then side project. The band currently consists of Landon as vocalist, Josh Childress as guitarist, Ethan Yoder as bassist and drummer Michael Cooper. He has released 5 albums and 4 EPs with The Plot In You. Their debut album First Born was published on April 18, 2011. Their most recent album Swan Song was published on September 17, 2021. Their most popular song, "Feel Nothing" from the album Dispose released in 2018, has gone gold in Canada on October 4, 2022. In the United States it went gold on November 30, 2022 and got certified platinum in August 2025.

Landon announced in early March 2014 that he was going to release a debut solo EP named Dead Kid on April 1, 2014, with "weird songs I can't use for anything else". The first single named "Ma and Pa" was published on YouTube on March 4, 2014, and the EP was eventually released on March 27, 2014. Tewers released another single track titled "I Hope You Have a Shitty Christmas" on December 24, 2014. He said he got drunk 'the other night' and wrote a Christmas song. He published the song to keep The Plot fans happy because they wouldn't release something until October 2015. In February 2015, Landon released another song to keep providing the band's fans with music. This time it was a cover of Drake's song "Hold On, We're Going Home". Sean Macdonald (Seanzy) provided backup vocals for the cover. In the same month, he released the songs "I'll Always Be Proud", "Feel You Out" and "Cleansed My Soul".

In September 2015, Landon released his first part of the Ai640 trilogy, which is about a robot that escapes a lab, then sees how awful humans are, and decides the only way to save earth is to kill all humans. The second part of the trilogy named Ai640, Pt. 2 got released in December 2017 and the third and last part in February 2020 which would complete the Ai640 trilogy. In December 2015, he released the Xmas - EP which consists of 4 songs, among his 2014 single "I Hope You Have a Shitty Christmas". Landon released his first solo album titled "Dynamite" on December 9, 2016, containing 10 tracks. "Withdrawals", Landon's second solo album, was released on July 19, 2019, which has 9 songs in it.

After the release of his second album, Tewers started to release more pop & hip-hop oriented songs. In 2020, Landon made a 'covid song' because of the COVID-19 pandemic. The song is named "Rona-19" and was made as a sneer to the people who feared it, while also still expressing his own concerns. His most recent EP Frontal Lobe Submission was released on January 29, 2021, with 6 songs. Rory Rodriguez from Dayseeker was featured on the song and single "Kill Me" and Gabbie Hanna was featured on "F Pacing". Tewers released 3 singles in 2022. The first one was "Maddie's Song", published on April 1, which was a song for his wife's birthday. The second song is "Sink with Me", featuring blanket and the third, "Over You", was a featuring with Waynewood and JavyDade. In 2023 he released 3 more songs, named "Cinnamon Skies", published on April 22, 2023, which is a collaboration with Waynewood and JavyDade and "I Like It", which was published on July 14, 2023. "Drag My Name" released on November 10 was the last release of this year, which was the second collab with Waynewood and JavyDade. Two singles were released in 2024; "Fallin Out" on June 28 and a week later on July 5th, another collaboration song with Waynewood & JavyDade called "Show up" was released. In 2025 he has released one more collab song with Waynewood & JavyDade on July 25 called "Too Late".

Next to creating his own music, Landon also spends a lot of time songwriting and (co-)producing songs and albums for many other artists and bands, including the album "Heavener" by Invent Animate, two albums by Gabbie Hanna, "Renovate" by Until I Wake, "The Host" by Acres and many others. He has also confirmed several times on different social media platforms and interviews that he fully wrote and produced every song and album released by his band The Plot In You.

== Personal life ==
He is married to Madison Rose Tewers since 2018; they live in Detroit, Michigan. He is one of several siblings; his sister is YouTuber Micarah Tewers.

== Solo discography ==
=== Albums ===
- Dynamite (2016)
- Withdrawals (2019)

=== Extended plays ===
- Dead Kid (2014)
- Ai640 (2015)
- Xmas EP (2015)
- Ai640, Pt. 2 (2017)
- Ai640, Pt. 3 (2020)
- Frontal Lobe Submission (2021)

=== Singles ===
- "Ma and Pa" (2014)
- "I Hope You Have a Shitty Christmas" (2014)
- "Hold On We're Going Home" featuring Seanzy (2015)
- "I'll Always Be Proud" (2015)
- "Feel You Out" (2015)
- "Creep" featuring DaBoiJ (2016)
- "What Do I Say" featuring Seanzy (2016)
- "Don't You" (2017)
- "Give You Something Too" (2018)
- "Holy Night" (2019)
- "Something to Lose" (2019)
- "Scattered Shit" (2019)
- "Debt" (2020)
- "Say It Ain't So" (2020)
- "Rona-19" (2020)
- "Everything I Wanted" (2020)
- "Gospel Therapy" (2020)
- "Kill Me" featuring Rory Rodriguez (2021)
- "Kill Me (Acoustic)" featuring Rory Rodriguez (2021)
- "Maddie's Song" (2022)
- "Sink with Me" featuring blanket (2022)
- "Over You" featuring Waynewood & JavyDade (2022)
- "Cinnamon Skies" in collaboration with Waynewood & JavyDade (2023)
- "I Like It" (2023)
- "Drag My Name" in collaboration with Waynewood & JavyDade (2023)
- "Fallin Out" (2024)
- "Show up" in collaboration with Waynewood & JavyDade (2024)
- "Too Late" in collaboration with Waynewood & JavyDade (2025)

=== Featured on ===
- "The Lost Ones" by From Atlantis (2011)
- "At the Ballet" by Restless Streets (2012)
- "West Side Artgoon Craigslist Killa" by Illuminate Me (2014)
- "Promises" by Safe Harbor (2014)
- "Sinister" by VCTMS (2014)
- "Eyes Wide Shut" by Empires Fade (2015)
- "everything ends" by silent screams (2015)
- "The Mansion" by Hylian (2015)
- "Wasted Time" by Wide Awake (2016)
- "Silent Echoes" by Hollow I Am (2016)
- "Beaten" by Advocates (2016)
- "Hit the Road" by Seanzy (2017)
- "Rated R..." by The White Noise (2017)
- "Driftwood" by Call It Home (2018)
- "Going Rogue" by Dropout Kings (2018)
- "Hit the Ground" by FRANK ZUMMO (2020)
- "Can't Escape" by Coda Meraki (2020)
- "Overdose" by Hurtwave (2021)
- "HYBRID PROCESS" by Darko US (2022)
- "Silence" by Archetypes Collide (2023)
- "When It Rains It Pours" by The Amity Affliction (2023)
- "Soul Slippin" by NOT A TOY (2023)
- "Technium" by Fit for a King (2024)
- "Qué Lo Qu'e Qu'atsu" by NEWCOMER (2025)
- "Stranger" by Prompts (2025)
- "Push Me Away" by Acres (2025)
- "Crowned and crucified " by Boundaries (2026)
