= Scream the Prayer Tour =

Former annual concert tour (2008–2013)

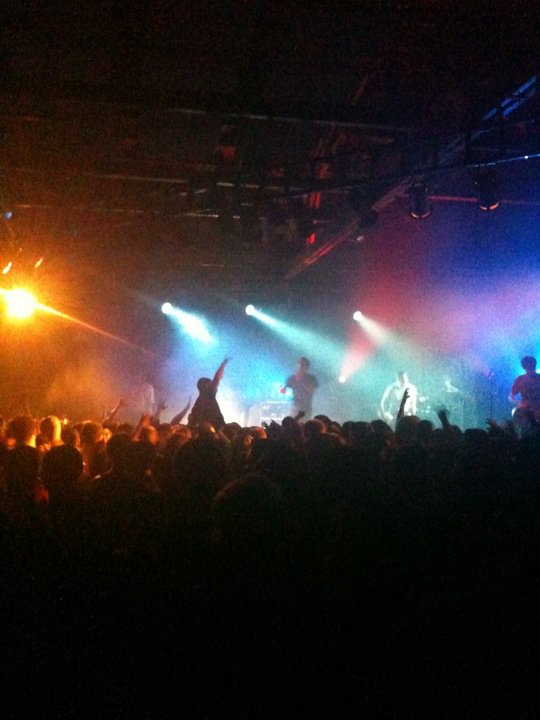
- For Today on stage in Pomona, California
- Genre: Christian hardcore, hardcore punk, metalcore, deathcore, Christian metal
- Location: United States
- Years active: 2008–2013
- Website: Scream the Prayer Tour on Twitter

The Scream the Prayer Tour, also known as Scream the Prayer, or simply STP, was an American Christian metalcore/hardcore music worship tour, presented by INRI Clothing. The tour had been held annually since it began, in mid-2008. In 2013 promoters decided it would be the final tour due to low ticket sales and lack of audience.

== 2008 ==
The line up for the first 2008 tour included Impending Doom, Sleeping Giant, MyChildren MyBride, War of Ages, Before Their Eyes, Blessed by a Broken Heart, Haste the Day, With Blood Comes Cleansing, Here I Come Falling, Akissforjersey, Agraceful, and Soul Embraced.

== 2009 ==
The line up for the 2009 tour included Haste the Day, The Chariot, Sleeping Giant, Project 86, Oh, Sleeper, Gwen Stacy, Agraceful, For Today, A Plea for Purging, and Corpus Christi.

== 2010 ==
The lineup for the 2010 tour included Maylene and the Sons of Disaster, For Today, Blessed by a Broken Heart, A Plea for Purging, The Color Morale, The Crimson Armada, I the Breather, The Great Commission, In the Midst of Lions, and Hundredth. The tour dates were announced below. This year marked the third annual tour.

Date	City	Country	Venue
June 30, 2010	Bushnell	United States	Cornerstone Festival
July 1, 2010	Bushnell	United States	Cornerstone Festival
July 2, 2010	Nashville	United States	Rockettown
July 3, 2010	Charlotte	United States	Amos
July 4, 2010	Douglasville	United States	The 7 Venue
July 5, 2010	Orlando	United States	Lyrica
July 6, 2010	Jacksonville	United States	Murray Hill Theatre
July 7, 2010	Birmingham	United States	The Vineyard Church
July 8, 2010	Pensacola	United States	American Legion
July 9, 2010	Houston	United States	The Warsaw
July 10, 2010	San Antonio	United States	White Rabbit
July 11, 2010	Dallas	United States	The Door
July 12, 2010	Tulsa	United States	The Marquee
July 13, 2010	Memphis	United States	The Arbor
July 16, 2010	Willmar	United States	Sonshine Festival
July 17, 2010	Omaha	United States	Grace University
July 18, 2010	St. Louis	United States	Firebird
July 20, 2010	Albuquerque	United States	Wool Warehouse
July 22, 2010	Las Vegas	United States	The Farm
July 24, 2010	Pomona	United States	Glasshouse
July 25, 2010	Orangevale	United States	Club Retro
July 27, 2010	Seattle	United States	Studio Seven
July 31, 2010	Longmont	United States	HeavenFest
August 3, 2010	Dayton	United States	The Attic
August 5, 2010	Gilford	United States	Soulfest
August 6, 2010	Vineland	United States	Hangar 84
August 7, 2010	Allentown	United States	Crocodile Rock
August 8, 2010	Baltimore	United States	Sonar

== 2011 ==
The lineup for the 2011 tour includes Norma Jean, Sleeping Giant, The Chariot, War of Ages, Close Your Eyes, Texas In July, I The Breather, The Great Commission, As Hell Retreats, and Sovereign Strength. The tour dates were announced below. This year marks the fourth annual tour.

Date	City	Country	Venue
July 1, 2011	Nashville	United States	Rocketown
July 2, 2011	Bushnell	United States	Cornerstone Festival (Not all STP bands on festival)
July 3, 2011	Bushnell	United States	Cornerstone Festival (Not all STP bands on festival)
July 5, 2011	Allentown	United States	Crocodile Rock
July 6, 2011	Baltimore	United States	Sonar
July 7, 2011	Charlotte	United States	Amos
July 8, 2011	Douglasville	United States	The 7 Venue
July 9, 2011	Jacksonville	United States	Murray Hill Theatre
July 10, 2011	Montgomery	United States	The Blue Iguana
July 11, 2011	Little Rock	United States	Revolution Room
July 14, 2011	Willmar	United States	Sonshine Festival
July 15, 2011	Winnipeg	Canada	Garrick Centre
July 16, 2011	Willmar	United States	Sonshine Festival
July 17, 2011	Milwaukee	United States	The Rave
July 18, 2011	Indianapolis	United States	Emerson Theater
July 19, 2011	Dayton	United States	The Attic
July 20, 2011	Memphis	United States	New Daisy Theatre
July 22, 2011	McAllen	United States	Las Palmas Racepark w/ The All Stars Tour
July 23, 2011	San Antonio	United States	The Backstage Live w/ The All Stars Tour
July 24, 2011	Dallas	United States	The Palladium w/ The All Stars Tour
July 25, 2011	Tulsa	United States	Cains Ballroom
July 26, 2011	Lawrence	United States	Granada Theatre
July 27, 2011	Denver	United States	Summit Music Hall
July 28, 2011	Salt Lake City	United States	The Complex
July 30, 2011	Tucson	United States	The Rock
July 31, 2011	Pomona	United States	Glasshouse

== 2012 ==
The lineup for the 2012 tour includes Demon Hunter (selective dates), Emery, Sleeping Giant, MyChildren MyBride, Close Your Eyes, Hundredth, The Great Commission, Gideon, A Bullet for Pretty Boy, Your Memorial, and To Speak of Wolves (selective dates). The tour dates are announced below. This year marks the fifth annual tour.

Date	City	Country	Venue
First leg (without To Speak of Wolves)
June 22, 2012	Nashville	United States	Rocketown
June 23, 2012	Douglasville	United States	The 7 Venue
June 24, 2012	Jacksonville	United States	Murray Hill Theatre
June 26, 2012	Charlotte	United States	Amos
June 27, 2012	Richmond	United States	Kingdom
June 28, 2012	Baltimore	United States	Sonar
June 30, 2012	Dayton	United States	The Attic
July 1, 2012	Joliet	United States	Mojoes
Second leg (without Demon Hunter)
July 2, 2012	Memphis	United States	Newby's
July 3, 2012	Birmingham	United States	Mountaintop Family Life Center
July 5, 2012	Corpus Christi	United States	House of Rock
July 6, 2012	Houston	United States	Warehouse Live
July 7, 2012	San Antonio	United States	White Rabbit
July 8, 2012	Dallas	United States	The Door
July 10, 2012	Tulsa	United States	The Compound
July 11, 2012	St. Louis	United States	Fubar
July 14, 2012	Goshen	United States	The Goshen Theatre

== 2013 ==
The lineup for the 2013 tour includes Impending Doom, Gideon, Wolves at the Gate, Fit For a King, The Great Commission, Everyone Dies in Utah, The Overseer, Those Who Fear, and Silent Planet. The tour dates have been announced below. This year marks the sixth annual tour.

Date	City	Country	Venue
June 30, 2013	Springfield	United States	Empire
July 1, 2013	Charlotte	United States	Amos
July 2, 2013	Louisville	United States	Vernon Club
July 3, 2013	Nashville	United States	Rocketown
July 5, 2013	Jacksonville	United States	Murray Hill Theatre
July 6, 2013	Orlando	United States	H2O Live!
July 7, 2013	Douglasville	United States	The 7 Venue
July 9, 2013	Mobile	United States	Alabama Music Box
July 10, 2013	Metairie	United States	The Cypress
July 11, 2013	Houston	United States	Walter's
July 12, 2013	San Antonio	United States	The White Rabbit
July 13, 2013	Dallas	United States	The Door
July 14, 2013	Springfield	United States	Outland Ballroom
July 15, 2013	Columbus	United States	Alrosa Villa
July 16, 2013	Joliet	United States	Mojoes
