= HeavenFest =

Annual Christian music festival

Coordinates: 39°39′49.76″N 105°11′16.48″W

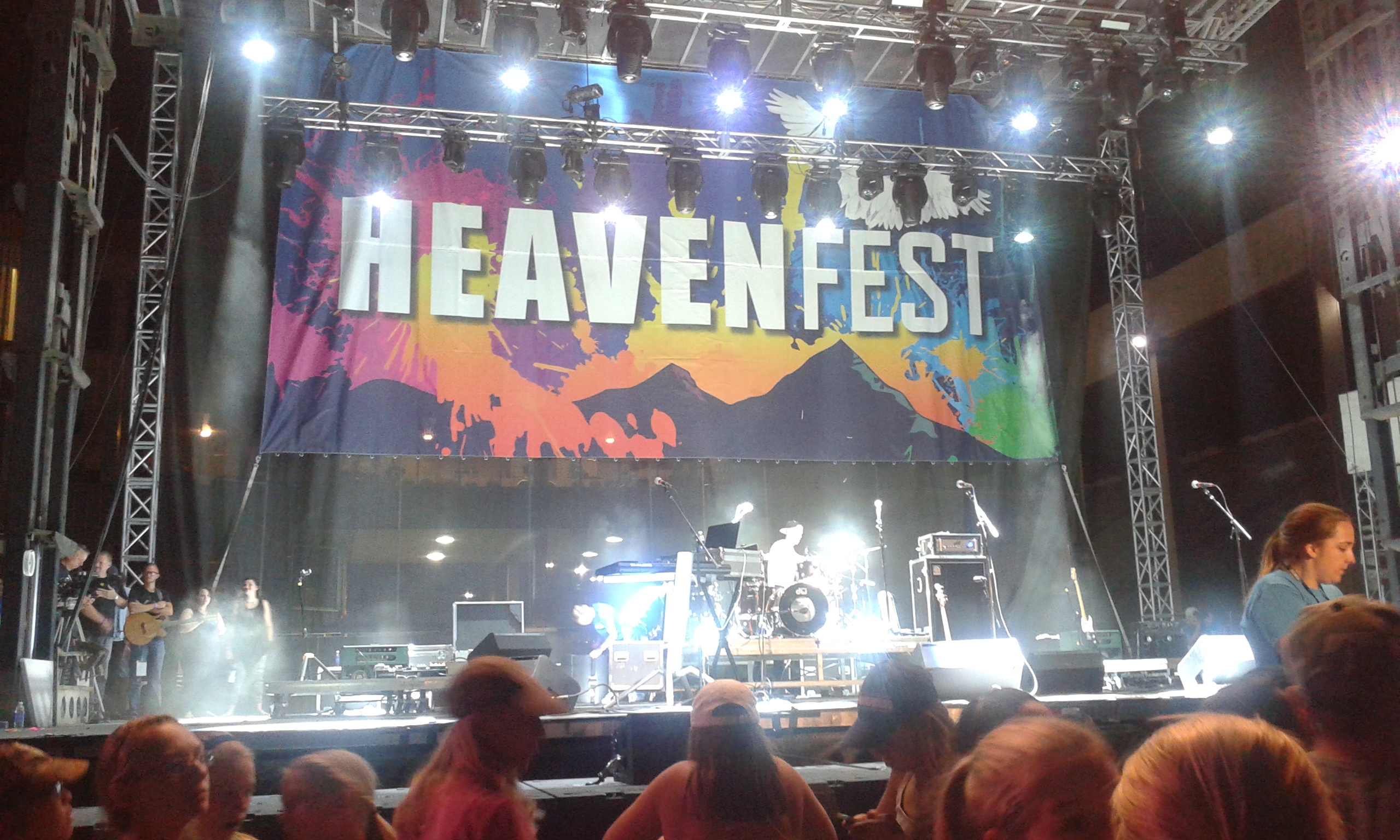
- Backdrop at the CCU Main Stage, HeavenFest 2015
- Genre: CCM, rock, pop, rap
- Locations: Brighton, Colorado (2008-2009); Longmont, Colorado (2010); Loveland, Colorado (2011–2012); Morrison, Colorado (2015-2016)
- Years active: 2008-2012, 2015-2016
- Founders: Worship and the Word Movement
- Website: www.heavenfest.net

HeavenFest was an annual Christian music festival attracting tens of thousands of people each summer. The festival was held in multiple cities over the years along the Front Range of Colorado.

== History ==
In its first two years, HeavenFest drew 12,500 and 23,000 people to the grounds of Northern Hills Church near Brighton, Colorado, a suburb of Denver. The 2010 event brought in the Scream the Prayer Tour while changing locations to a field in Longmont and drawing over 35,000 attendees. After one year in Longmont, The Ranch (Larimer County Fairgrounds and Events Complex) in Loveland became the new host of the festival. After 2 years in Loveland, organizers cancelled the 2013 event for "a year of rest." In July 2014 it was announced on HeavenFest's Facebook page that the festival would return under new ownership and management after a two year hiatus. The 2015 event was held August 7–8 at Bandimere Speedway in Morrison and it was there they announced that HeavenFest would return to the dragstrip July 29th-30th 2016.

== Past Artists ==
- Andy Mineo
- The Afters
- Alive City
- The Almost
- As I Lay Dying
- Biff Gore
- Blanca
- Blessed by a Broken Heart
- Brad Stine
- Braille
- Brightwork
- Building 429
- Capital Kings
- Citipointe Live
- The City Harmonic
- The Color Morale
- Colton Dixon
- Corey Clark
- Danny Oertli
- Da' T.R.U.T.H.
- Derek Minor
- The Devil Wears Prada
- The Digital Age
- Disciple
- Everfound
- Facing West
- Family Force 5
- Fireflight
- For Today
- Foreverlin
- The Great Commission
- Group 1 Crew
- Haste the Day
- Hearts of Worship
- Hundredth
- Hymns for Hunger
- Icon for Hire
- Ignescent
- ILIA
- Jaci Velasquez
- Jamie Grace
- Jeremy Camp
- Joy Hill & The Potters House Band
- KJ-52
- Lauren Daigle
- Lecrae
- Lincoln Brewster
- Love and Death
- Love & The Outcome
- Madeline Garcia
- Mandisa
- Manic Drive
- Maylene and the Sons of Disaster
- Meagan Thwaites
- Medic
- Memphis May Fire
- Michael Gungor
- Mountain City
- NF
- Nine Lashes
- No Fair Fights
- OC Supertones
- Page CXVI
- P.O.D.
- Petra
- Phil Keaggy
- Phocust
- Propaganda
- Random Hero
- Raza For Christ
- Red Rocks Worship
- Sanctus Real
- Seventh Day Slumber
- Shonlock
- Skillet
- Sleeping Giant
- The Smiley Kids
- S.O.G. Crew
- Spoken
- Stellar Kart
- Superchick
- Switchfoot
- Syke Ninety Six
- Tedashii
- Tenth Avenue North
- Third Day
- Thousand Foot Krutch
- Trace Bundy
- Transform DJ's
- Trip Lee
- Tyrone Crawford
- Underoath
- Unspoken
- VERIDIA
- Vertical Church Band
- White Collar Sideshow
- Worship Mob
- Zane Black
