= Slick Shoes =

American punk rock band

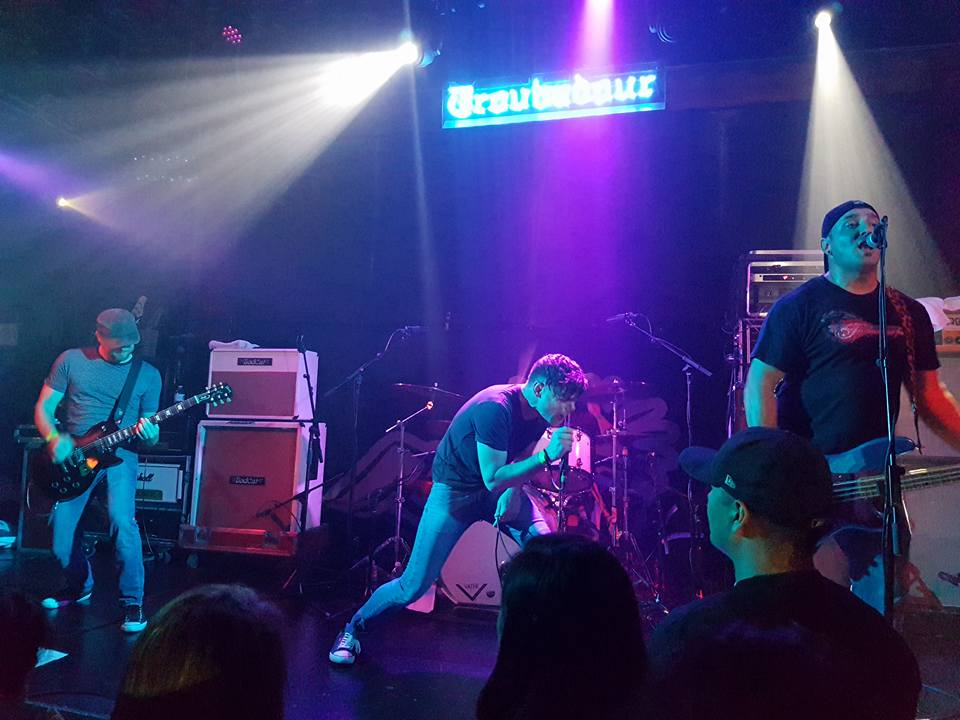
- Slick Shoes performing in 2016

Background information
- Origin: Antelope Valley, California, United States
- Genres: Punk rock, pop punk, skate punk
- Years active: 1994–2004, 2007–2008, 2011–2012, 2015–present
- Labels: SideOneDummy, Tooth & Nail, Fueled by Ramen
- Members: Ryan Kepke; Joe Nixon; Jackson Mould; Jeremiah Brown; Jonah Peterson
- Past members: Dale Yob; Andrew Tremblay; Greg Togawa; David Stoltenberg; Adam Stiletto; Kevin Clark; Josh Kleven; Bill Lanz; Jordan Mould

Slick Shoes is an American punk rock band from Antelope Valley, California, United States. The band formed in 1994 and made their first release as a self-titled EP in 1996. In 2022, Loudwire magazine named the "Wake Up Screaming" album one of the 50 greatest pop-punk albums of all time.

Slick Shoes released six full-length CDs, four of them on Seattle-based Tooth & Nail Records. They also released an EP, a split with Autopilot Off and a greatest hits CD entitled The Biggest & The Best, featuring three previously unreleased songs.

The band had gone through numerous line-up changes over the years, but singer Ryan Kepke and Joe Nixon (drums) performed on every release, while Jeremiah Brown (bass) played on all except their final album, Far From Nowhere (2003), released by SideOneDummy Records instead of the Tooth & Nail.

The third album, Wake Up Screaming (2000) got production from Bill Stevenson of Black Flag fame.

The band's success rode the back of the mid-to-late '90s Christian punk popularity wave that spurred churched teens around the nation to embrace the genre and even start rock clubs, such as the 9th Hour in Richmond and The New Union in Minneapolis. They toured alongside both secular and Christian acts (most notably bands such as Face to Face and MxPx, respectively). In 2002, they toured with Mighty Mighty Bosstones; in 2003, they played the Vans Warped Tour and were featured in Warped Tour DVD in 2004. The Jonas Brothers, when teens, were fans and traveled to their shows.

== 2004–2008 ==
Since touring in 2003 and early 2004 in support of Far From Nowhere, Slick Shoes was very inactive (even their website was taken down), and on October 7, 2006, the band issued a statement through their MySpace page saying that they had begun a side project called Sigmund, and that Slick Shoes was on an "indefinite hiatus". Then, 15 months later on January 3, 2008, the band announced through MySpace that they had reunited:

"Slick Shoes is back together with original members Ryan Kepke, Jackson Mould, Joe Nixon, and Jeremiah Brown. We also added guitarist Jordan Mould. Although we will not be touring extensively we will be playing shows and hope to record a new record in the near future. Don't forget to tell your friends."

== Post-2017 ==
Their first show back together took place at Schooner's in Lancaster, CA in December, 2007, with their last show at the Key Club in Hollywood, CA on April 10, 2008.

The band has been inactive since early 2008, but in October 2011, the band created an official Facebook page. On December 11, 2011, the band announced a comeback show on March 17, 2012, at Chain Reaction in Anaheim, California.

On February 17–18, Slick Shoes did a two night stand in Dallas Texas at the legendary Tree's Venue.

As of early 2017 Slick Shoes is back in action with original "Rusty" line up (as well as Jonah from the Far from Nowhere Era). They are playing select shows through the year and are currently writing and rehearsing new material.

On August 18, 2018, Slick Shoes headlined a show at the House of Blues Anaheim Parish Room. They announced that the show was being recorded for their first live album.

October 24, 2019, Slick Shoes Announced they were rejoining Tooth and Nail Records with "Broadcasting Live" and a new album, "Rotation & Frequency", released in September 2020.

== Style and influences ==
Slick Shoes has been described as punk rock, pop punk, and skate punk in the vein of Blink-182 and Green Day. The band's influences include Germs, Descendents, Lagwagon, Angelic Upstarts and Circle Jerks.

The name comes from the 1985 movie The Goonies. In the film, Richard "Data" Wang (played by Jonathan Ke Huy Quan) says, "I got a great idea you guys: Slick shoes." They reply, in unison, "Slick shoes? Are you crazy?" The clip is the intro to the first song on the first Slick Shoes album.

== Band members ==
Current members

- Ryan Kepke – lead vocals (1994–2004, 2007–2008, 2011–2012, 2015–present)
- Joe Nixon – drums (1994–2004, 2007–2008, 2011–2012, 2015–present)
- Jackson Mould – lead guitar, backing vocals (1994–1998, 2007–2008, 2011–2012, 2015–present)
- Jeremiah Brown – bass guitar, backing vocals (1994–2002, 2007–2008, 2011–2012, 2015–present)
- Jonah Peterson – rhythm guitar, backing vocals (2002–2003, 2011–2012, 2015–present)

Former members

- Dale Yob – rhythm guitar, backing vocals (1997–1999)
- Andrew Tremblay
- Greg Togawa – lead guitar, backing vocals (1999–2002)
- David Stoltenberg
- Adam Stilleto
- Kevin Clark
- Josh Klevin
- Bill Lanz
- Jordan Mould

== Discography ==
- Rusty (1997)
- Burn Out (1998)
- Wake Up Screaming (2000)
- Slick Shoes (2002)
- Far from Nowhere (2003)
- Broadcasting Live (2019)
- Rotation & Frequency (2020)
