= I, the Breather =

American metalcore band

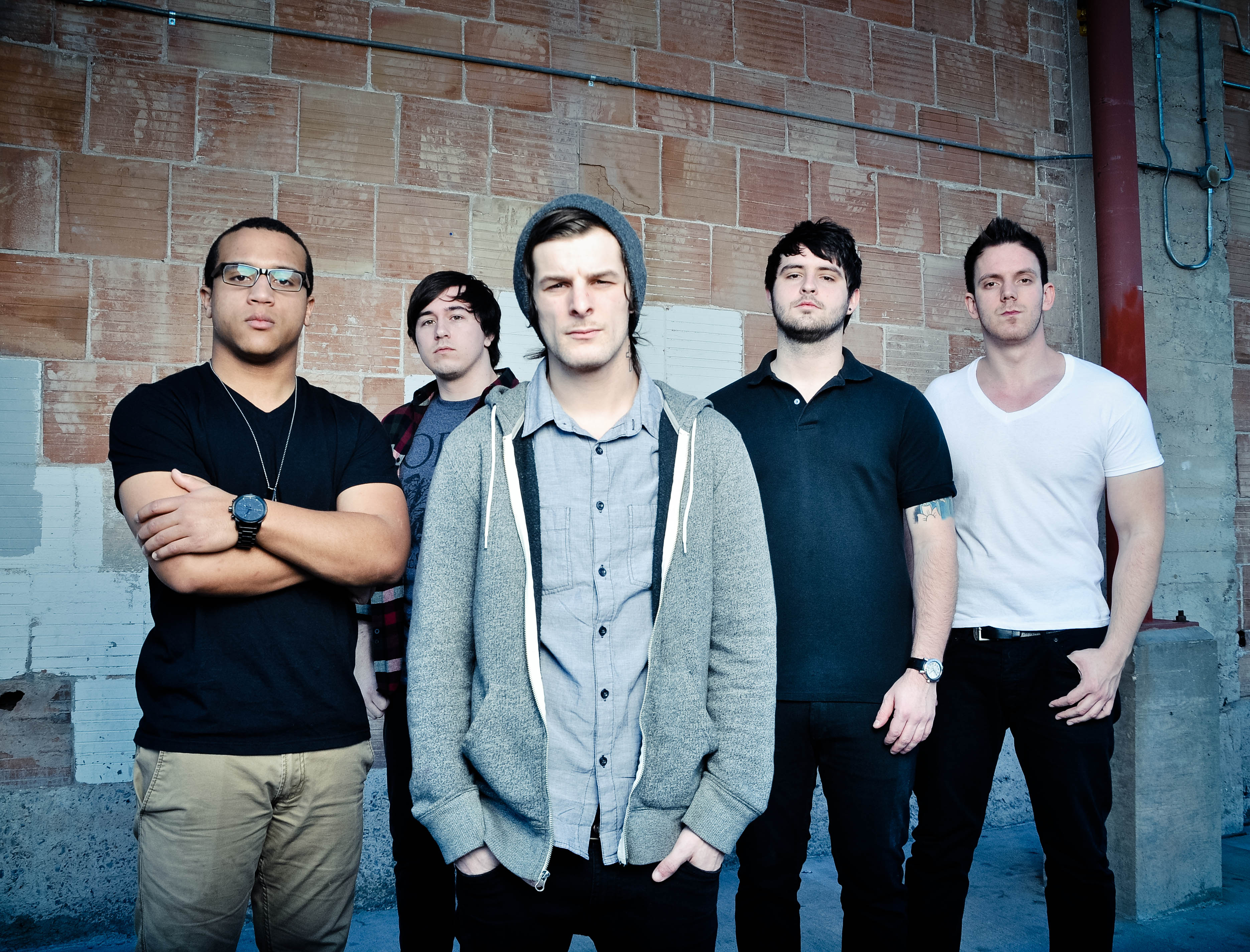
- I, the Breather in January 2012

Background information
- Origin: Baltimore, Maryland, U.S.
- Genres: Metalcore, Christian metal (early)
- Years active: 2009–2015, 2020–2022, 2025-Present
- Label: Sumerian
- Past members: Shawn Spann; Jered Youngbar; Justin Huffman; Armand Jasari; Morgan Wright; Chase Kozlowski; Aaron Ovecka; Kyle Bowman; Mack Goth; Conor Hesse; Logan Young; Nik Popovic
- Website: I, the Breather on Facebook

I, the Breather was an American metalcore band from Baltimore, Maryland. Formed by Shawn Spann, Justin Huffman and Morgan Wright in late 2009, the group was signed to Sumerian Records and had released three albums through the label before announcing their disbanding in 2015.

In 2020, the band briefly reformed with new members and put out two new songs before retiring again.

== History ==
The band was formed by lead vocalist Shawn Spann during 2007 as a side project. After spending a couple years sifting through bands/members to find the right members for I the Breather, Shawn Spann was introduced to Justin Huffman and Morgan Wright by mutual friends. Huffman and Wright had been previously writing music and merged ideas to write the band's self-titled debut studio EP which ended up getting them a record deal with a major label and management. As the band's initial line-up began to settle in, work on their first album began. On June 3, 2010, the band signed onto Sumerian Records. On April 15, 2010, it was announced that I, The Breather would be playing on the "Scream the Prayer Tour" with supporting acts For Today, Blessed by a Broken Heart, A Plea for Purging, The Color Morale, The Crimson Armada, The Great Commission, In the Midst of Lions, and Hundredth.

On December 7, 2010, I, the Breather released their first studio album, entitled These Are My Sins on the Sumerian Records label. Following the release of the album, the band premiered their first music video with the song "Forgiven" later that day.

After extensive summer touring to support These Are My Sins, it was announced on September 16, 2011 that the band had entered the studio and was working on their second studio album with Sumerian Records. "So here it, Its official! Were recording our 2nd album in November! We will be announcing our producer this coming week. Who would like to see what all of our lives are like at home?! I was thinking it would be an awesome addition to studio footage!" Throughout early 2012, the band toured with fellow acts, August Burns Red, Silverstein, Texas in July, and Letlive. On February 28, 2012, I, the Breather released its second studio album, entitled Truth and Purpose through Sumerian Records.

The band also toured on 2012 Rockstar Energy Drink Mayhem Festival tour featuring Slipknot, Slayer, Anthrax, Motörhead, As I Lay Dying, The Devil Wears Prada, Asking Alexandria, Whitechapel, Upon a Burning Body, Betraying the Martyrs and Dirtfedd. On May 4, 2012, a music video for the song, "False Profit" was released. On May 24, 2012, bassist Armand Jasari announced he would be leaving the band via his Facebook. Jasari was then replaced by Conor Hesse on bass guitar. Justin Huffman was next to leave the band, handing the lead guitar parts over to Chase Kozlowski, and left a spot open for second guitarist, Kyle Bowman.

On August 2, 2013, the band parted ways with drummer Morgan Wright. Wright was one of the founding members of the band. The split seems to have been amicable. Aaron Ovecka has been named as his replacement for a drummer. On December 20, the band has released a new song through Sumerian Records, entitled "The Setting Sun" from their third studio album, entitled Life Reaper, which the album later dropped on July 15, 2014. On May 7, 2014, the band announced that they would be playing that year's Van's Warped Tour. On June 10, 2014, a music video for the second single, "Soul:Seek" was released. I, The Breather opened up for Unearth and Darkest Hour on their High or High Wattage Tour in the fall of 2014. Carnifex, Origin and Black Crown Initiate were all featured as support.

On September 3, 2015, I, the Breather announced that they will break up following a farewell tour set for November.

On October 10, 2020, the band announced their return and premiered a new single titled "Prëy".

On January 4, 2021, the band announced the additions of Logan Young (of Reflections and Dal Av) and Nik Popovic (of Termina, also known as Nik Nocturnal of YouTube fame) into the band. On September 8, 2021, the band released a new single "Brainsic", with an accompanying music video; the first material released with Nik Nocturnal in the band. Throughout January and February 2022, the band went on a North American tour they called "10 Year Reunion Tour" for their first two albums. At the conclusion of the tour the band quietly ceased operations again.

== Members ==
Former members

- Shawn Spann – lead vocals (2009–2015, 2020–2022)
- Logan Young – guitars (2020–2022)
- Nik Popovic (aka Nik Nocturnal) – guitars (2021–2022)
- Jered Youngbar – rhythm guitar (2009–2011)
- Justin Huffman – lead guitar (2009–2012), rhythm guitar, bass (2009)
- Armand "Deep V" Jasari – bass (2009–2012)
- Morgan Wright – drums (2009–2013)
- Chase Kozlowski – lead guitar, backing vocals (2012–2014), rhythm guitar (2011–2012)
- Aaron Ovecka – drums (2013–2015)
- Kyle "Bibbins" Bowman – rhythm guitar (2013–2015), lead guitar (2014–2015)
- Mack Goth – guitars (2015)
- Conor Hesse – bass guitar, backing vocals (2012–2015)

Timeline

== Discography ==
Year	Title	Type	Label	Billboard 200	Christian US Album	US Heat
2009	I, the Breather	EP	self-released	N/A	N/A	N/A
2010	These Are My Sins	Studio album	Sumerian	N/A	N/A	39
2012	Truth and Purpose	Studio album	Sumerian	N/A	15	11
2014	Life Reaper	Studio album	Sumerian	158	6	N/A

== Tours ==
- Scream the Prayer Tour
- Farewell to Breather Tour
- 10 Year Reunion Tour for "These Are My Sins" and "Truth and Purpose"

== Videography ==
Title	Year	Director	From the album
"Forgiven"	2009	Chris Rodriguez	These Are My Sins
"False Profit"	2012	Thunder Down Country Productions	Truth and Purpose
"Soul:Seek"	2014	Orie McGinness	Life Reaper
"PREY"	2020	Phillip Christopher	-
"BRAINSIC"	2021	Phillip Christopher	-
