= Everyone Dies in Utah =

American metalcore band

Everyone Dies In Utah
- Origin: Temple, Texas, U.S.
- Genres: Metalcore, post-hardcore, electronicore
- Years active: 2008–present
- Labels: InVogue, Tragic Hero, ONErpm
- Members: Danny Martinez; Daniel Tharp; Nathan Chase-Meadows; Brett Wasson; Ruben Tirado

Everyone Dies In Utah is an American metalcore band from Temple, Texas. The band was featured on the Compilation, A Tribute to Taking Back Sunday They also covered Katy Perry's song, "Unconditionally". The band played the 2013 Scream the Prayer Tour, along with Impending Doom, Wolves at the Gate, The Great Commission, Fit for a King, and Those Who Fear.

== History ==
=== Formation and signing (2008–2014) ===
Formed in 2008 by Danny Martinez, Trey Golden, Justin Morgan, and Dustin Dow, the band wrote and recorded their first EP I Hope You Know This Means War in 2009. The EP, as well as playing local shows frequently, gained the attention of a record label. The band signed to Tragic Hero Records in 2010 and had three full-length releases (Seeing Clearly, Polarities, and Neutral Ground) under the label. The band parted ways with Tragic Hero in late 2014. The name of the band began as a joke, but stuck with them as time went on. It derives from the fact that the death rate in Utah was at one time higher than any other state.

=== Exodus ===
In late 2014 the band independently released their single Exodus. It was well-received by fans in comparison to their previous album release.

=== Self titled album and new record deal with inVogue Records (2015 - present) ===
In 2015, it was announced via the band's Facebook that they were entering the studio to record a new album. Following the release of "A Decade Under The Influence", the band toured extensively throughout North America. In April 2015, they embarked on the As The Seasons Change Tour with direct support from One Year Later and Dreamer/Deceiver, with Her Majesty The King joining for select Canadian dates. On December 7, 2015, Everyone Dies in Utah announced on their Facebook that they have signed a record deal with inVogue Records. On Jan. 1st, 2016, the band released the first single, "Chronophobia", off of their new upcoming album. The album was released on October 7, 2016. On April 2, 2020, the band released a heavy version of Joe Exotic's 2015 country song "Here Kitty Kitty", which gained newfound popularity due to the success of the Netflix series Tiger King and interest in the cold case of Carole Baskin's ex-husband's possible murder which is addressed in the lyrics.

== Band members ==
Current

- Danny Martinez - Vocals
- Nathan Chase-Meadows - Drums
- Daniel Tharp - Bass
- Brett Wasson - Guitar
- Ruben Tirado - Guitar

== Discography ==
Studio albums

- Seeing Clearly (2011; Tragic Hero)
- Polarities (2012; Tragic Hero)
- Neutral Ground (2013; Tragic Hero)
- Everyone Dies in Utah (2016; InVogue Records)
- SUPRA (2021; ONErpm)
- INFRA (2021; ONErpm)
- The Cost of Clarity (2025; 10and8management)

Singles

- "E.T." (Originally by Katy Perry; 2010)
- "Unconditionally" (Originally by Katy Perry; 2014)
- "Exodus" (2014)
- "A Decade Under The Influence" (Originally by Taking Back Sunday; 2015)
- "Chronophobia" (2016)
- "X" (2018)
- "Circles" (Originally by Post Malone; 2019)
- "Planetary" (2020)
- "Passenger//pt.2" (2020)
- Don't Waste Your Breath (2025)
