= Weights and measures (disambiguation) =

Weights and measures are units of measurement subject to governmental regulation, to ensure fairness and transparency.

Weights and Measures may also refer to:

- Various Weights and Measures Acts
- The International Bureau of Weights and Measures, the international standards organisation and its subsidiary
  - International Committee for Weights and Measures, the 18-member core group that meets every year and
  - General Conference on Weights and Measures, a larger group that meets only every four to six years
- Weights and Measures (Spirit of the West album), 1997
- Weights & Measures (Hyland album), 2011
- On Weights and Measures (Epiphanius)

== See also ==
- Metrology
