= MyChildren MyBride =

American Christian metalcore band

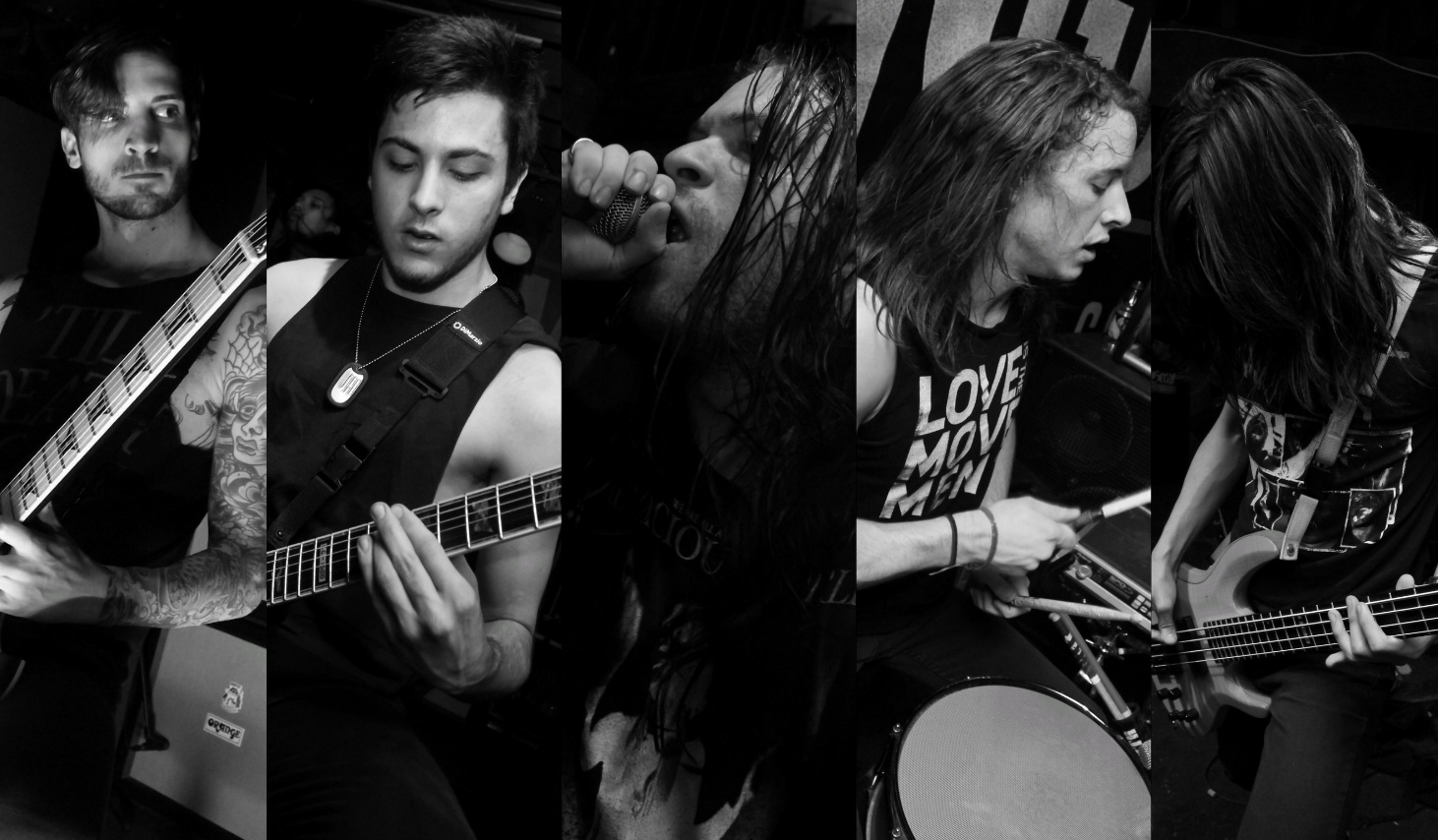
- MyChildren MyBride performing in 2011

Background information
- Origin: Madison, Alabama
- Genres: Metalcore, Christian metal
- Years active: 2004–present
- Labels: Solid State, Good Fight, eOne
- Members: Matthew Hasting; Robert Bloomfield; Andrew Holzbaur
- Website: MyChildren MyBride on Facebook

MyChildren MyBride is an American metalcore band from Madison, Alabama. The group originally signed with Solid State Records after extensive constant touring, including various dates in European countries. After spending seven years and releasing three full-length albums with Solid State, MyChildren MyBride signed with eOne/Good Fight Music.

== History ==
MyChildren MyBride was founded in 2004 in Madison, Alabama while its members were still enrolled in high school. The group proceeded to promote home recordings every way possible, to gain exposure and a larger fan base. Original musicians were Kyle Ray, Brian Hood, Matt Hasting, and Rob Noneman. Over the years, musicians came and went, but the band was determined to find a solid member line-up.

While MyChildren MyBride was on tour with a band called Stars Are Falling, they found and recruited Robert Bloomfield. Directly after, Robert joined MyChildren MyBride as second guitarist. Upon signing a contract to Solid State Records in 2007, Robert asked full-time medical student and drummer of the band Braveheart, Joe Lengson, to join the band to play bass. Towards the culmination of summer 2008, original guitarist, Kyle Ray, was replaced by Daniel Alvarado from the band Here I Come Falling to join, just as Here I Come Falling was announcing the band's breakup. Towards the end of 2008, the original drummer, Brian Hood, decided to leave the band to start his own recording studio. He now owns 456 Recordings in Nashville, Tennessee. The band spent a year working on finding another drummer, but they did not find a permanent drummer until the beginning of 2010, when the band found Mathis Arnell of Requiem for Sirens, hailing from Geneva, Switzerland, who they invited to come to the States to play drums for the band.

=== Unbreakable ===
Their first full-length album Unbreakable was released on Solid State Records on February 26, 2008. The album was produced by Joey Sturgis (The Devil Wears Prada) and mixed by Adam Dutkiewicz (Killswitch Engage). Directly after their Solid State debut was released, the band supported Unearth, Bury Your Dead, and As Blood Runs Black on a full East Coast tour.

The group played Cornerstone Festival 2008 and appeared on the Scream the Prayer Tour with bands such as Impending Doom, With Blood Comes Cleansing and War of Ages.

In October 2008, MyChildren MyBride decided to revolve around their Christian faith, and asked the original guitarist, Kyle Ray, to leave the band, due to his lack of faith.

In Oct–Nov 2008 the band supported Norma Jean on The Anti-Mother Tour along with Haste the Day, The Showdown, Children 18:3, and Oh, Sleeper.

In December 2008, they went on a tour with Stick to Your Guns, and the next month, the band went on a January and February tour with As I Lay Dying, Protest The Hero, and The Human Abstract.

A video for the song "On Wings of Integrity" was released on February 16, 2010 by the band in conjunction with Mitchell Davis with over 60,000+ hits within 18 hours.

=== Lost Boy ===
The band finished recording their new album at Glow in the Dark Studio in Atlanta, Georgia, with the help of Matt Goldman, who has worked with various artists including Underoath, The Chariot, and Copeland. In early 2009, they headlined the Burgers and Bowling tour with The Red Chord, Chelsea Grin, and Those Who Lie Beneath.

They went on a full North American tour in 2009 supporting Parkway Drive alongside Stick to Your Guns.

In the summer of 2009, the band accomplished the Thrash And Burn Tour alongside DevilDriver, Emmure, Despised Icon, Veil of Maya, For the Fallen Dreams, Oceano, Periphery, and Thy Will Be Done. Later that year, they went on tour with The Acacia Strain and Impending Doom in support of August Burns Red for their album Constellations.

At the end of Spring 2010 they supported Haste the Day on their Attack of the Wolf King tour, which crossed North America. The tour also featured the Texas metalcore/deathcore band Upon a Burning Body of Sumerian Records.

The band is confirmed to directly support deathcore band, Suicide Silence for the month of October during the band's No Time to Bleed tour, which will also feature Molotov Solution, Conducting from the Grave and The Tony Danza Tapdance Extravaganza.

=== MyChildren MyBride ===
The band began touring with Haste the Day again in February 2011 in support of their Farewell Tour, along with A Plea for Purging and The Chariot. In March 2011, the band toured with The Chariot in Europe.

In April 2011 guitarist Dan Alvarado decided that it was time for him to leave the band. He posted a message as a note on Facebook citing God's leading for him to go a different direction. There are no hard feelings between him and the rest of the band. He was replaced by Hunter Walls.

In June 2011, The band co-headlined with Impending Doom, on the Nocturnal Alliance tour, with This or the Apocalypse, A Bullet for Pretty Boy, and The Crimson Armada.

In September 2011, The band headlined an Australian tour with Sydney band For All Eternity.

In October 2011, Mychildren Mybride entered the studio with Zeuss at Planet Z Recordings in Hadley Massachusetts to record their third Solid State Records release entitled MyChildren MyBride, set to be released on March 13, 2012.

The band toured in support for For Today on the Fight the Silence Tour in March and April 2012. In mid-2012, the band toured on the Scream the Prayer Tour. 6 Bassist Joe Lengson left the band in March 2012 to be replaced by Nelson Flores of The Great Commission and Sovereign Strength.

=== Label change ===
In September 2014, the band signed with a new label, eOne/Good Fight Music and are expected to release their label debut in early 2015.

== Members ==
Current

- Matthew Hasting – lead vocals (2004–present)
- Robert Bloomfield – lead guitar (2013–present), rhythm guitar (2007–2012, 2013–present), bass (2007–2008, 2012–2013, 2017–present), backing vocals (2007–present)
- Andrew Holzbaur – drums (currently of Impending Doom) (2017–present)

Former

- Kyle Ray (currently of Dismal Dream, No Cure) – lead guitar (2004–2008), bass (2022)
- Corey Brandon – rhythm guitar (2004–2006)
- Brian Hood – drums (2004–2009)
- Rob Noneman – bass (2004–2007)
- Brett Howell – rhythm guitar (2006–2008); bass (2007–2008)
- Joe Lengson – bass, backing vocals (2008–2012)
- Patrick Snyder – drums (2009–2010)
- Daniel Alvarado (formerly of Here I Come Falling) – lead guitar (2008–2011)
- Hunter Walls – lead guitar (2011–2013, 2022)
- Cory Johnson (formerly of Sleeping Giant, xDEATHSTARx, and Impending Doom) – rhythm guitar (2012–2017); lead guitar (2013–2017)
- Nelson Flores (formerly of The Great Commission and Sovereign Strength) – bass (2013–2017)
- Mathis Arnell (currently of The Plot in You) – drums (2010–2017)

Touring musicians

- Paul Vickery – bass (2007)
- Nicholas Giberson – bass (2007)
- Sonny Tremblay – drums (2009)
- Justin Salinas (formerly of The Word Alive and Scars of Tomorrow) – drums (2009)
- Zack Shell – drums (2009)
- Justin Durante – bass (2019–present)
- Harry Haber – rhythm and lead guitar (2019–present)

== Discography ==
Studio albums

Title	Label	Date of release
Unbreakable	Solid State Records	February 26, 2008
Lost Boy	Solid State Records	June 8, 2010
MyChildren MyBride	Solid State Records	March 13, 2012
Vicious World	eOne Music / Good Fight	October 13, 2017

Other releases

- Having the Heart for War (self-released — July 4, 2005)

Appearance on compilations

- Atticus Clothing - Atticus: IV – "The Machinist"
- Tooth & Nail Records - Songs from the Penalty Box Vol. Seven – "On Wings of Integrity"

== Videography ==
- "Faithless" by Tooth & Nail Records
- "On Wings of Integrity" by Tooth & Nail Records, Mitchell Davis of livelavalive, and David Brodsky
- "Terra Firma" by Tooth & Nail Records and David Brodsky
- "Crimson Grim" by Tooth & Nail Records
- "King of the Hopeless" by Tooth & Nail Records
- "On Wings of Integrity Part II" by Solid State Records
- "God of Nothing" by Solid State Records
