= Joe Lengson =

American singer-songwriter

Joseph Henry Lengson
- Lengson at The Freight and Salvage in Berkeley, California in 2012

Background information
- Born: Joseph Henry Lengson; October 6, 1989 (age 36); Los Angeles, California, United States
- Genres: Folk rock, indie, metalcore, ambient
- Occupation: Singer-songwriter
- Instruments: Vocals, guitar, bass, drums, piano, digital production
- Labels: CI Records, Autumn + Colour, T&N / Solid State, 1981

Joseph Henry Lengson (born October 6, 1989) is an American musician, author, and photographer. Lengson is best known for his involvement in the Tooth & Nail/SolidState metal band, MyChildren MyBride and is currently performing under the moniker The Woodsman's Babe.

== Early life ==
Lengson was born in Los Angeles, California. He began playing piano at age seven and had participated in many local musical projects growing up ranging from early American folk to death metal. Lengson wasn't brought up in a spiritual household, however found faith at the age of seventeen on his own after extensive research and questioning. Before Lengson discovered he could be a musician, Lengson wanted to be a medical doctor.

== Musical life ==
Lengson's first solo record was released in 2004 under the name Red Lights & Semis, which was an instrumental ambient electronic project that stemmed off the aspiration to create film score soundtrack music. Red Lights & Semis One garnered attention from musical published agencies, and utilized the track "Magnum" over a Biological Education Series on Discovery Channel in 2006. Lengson released Red Lights and Semis Two in 2005, and Red Lights and Semis Three in 2007.

In 2006, Lengson and friends started the hardcore band, XBraveheartX, where Lengson sat in as the drummer. In 2008, XBraveheartX signed to 1981 Records that released the band's debut album Speak To These Bones.

In 2007, Lengson's former high school bandmate, Robert Bloomfield, asked Lengson to join Mychildren Mybride to be a full-time bassist when they signed to the record label Tooth & Nail Records / Solid State Records. At the time Lengson was studying medical at Northern Arizona University. Lengson joined in September 2007 and was a part of Mychildren Mybride. The band released the 2008 debut record Unbreakable, (Joey Sturgis, Adam Dutkiewicz) the 2010 album Lost Boy, (Matt Goldman, Jason Seucof,) which landed on the Billboard 200 and the 2012 self-titled album, Mychildren Mybride, (Zeuss.)

== Solo works ==
In the fall of 2010, Lengson was offered a position hosting a MTVu television show counting down the top music videos, after winning a contest hosted by Mountain Dew, but declined the offer to continue to tour. In May 2011, Lengson's book, Sleeping in Parking Lots, a 30-chapter memoir of tour stories and personal life lessons, was published worldwide.

In 2012, Lengson left MyChildren MyBride and moved back to Los Angeles to focus on a new solo musical project, The Woodsman's Babe. Lengson played his last show with Mychildren Mybride at the House of Blues in Anaheim, CA.

In 2013, Lengson had his second literary work "Too Many States Get in the Way" published by Autumn + Colour. The book's subtitle is "Poems About Love & Loss" and is of poetry and lyricism that Lengson wrote while transitioning from Mychildren Mybride to The Woodsman's Babe.

== The Woodsman's Babe ==
In February 2012, nine months after announcing his departure with MyChildren MyBride, Lengson premiered The Woodsman's Babe via Alternative Press along with first single Red or White.

Lengson on the name of the project, "It was the title of an old book that I found in a used book store. I found the name to be masculine and sexy at the same time. None of my friends liked the name, they didn't really get it, that's probably why I chose it. I didn't put too much thought into it, the name was really the least important element to the whole project to me." In May 2013, the music video of Red or White premiered on MTV on the program AMTV, where MTV noted Lengson a MTV Buzzworthy artist and quoted Lengson to be "all over the darn place."

In August 2013, The Woodsman's Babe signed with the independent record label Autumn + Colour, where he released the self-titled EP . In February 2015, The Woodsman's Babe signed with CI Records, where the debut full-length album is to be released.

On April 15, 2016, The Woodsman's Babe released the second album under CI Records, "BABELAND" which was produced by Stephen Keech. In an interview for Urban Outfitters, Lengson states he was "drinking a lot and sleeping a lot" in the month that he wrote Babeland. In April 2016 Joe headlined the Babeland tour in support of the new album.
