= On the Run (Children 18:3 album) =

Studio album by Children 18:3
- Released: June 19, 2012
- Genre: Christian punk, punk rock
- Length: 39:47
- Label: Tooth & Nail

Children 18:3 chronology
Rain's a Comin' (2010)	On the Run (2012)	Come In (2015)

On the Run is the third studio album by Children 18:3, released on June 19, 2012 on Tooth & Nail Records.

== Critical reception ==
Professional ratings
Review scores
Source	Rating
About.com	4/5 stars
HM Magazine	4/5 stars 3.5/5 stars
Indie Vision Music	4/5 stars
Jesus Freak Hideout	4.5/5 stars
Louder Than the Music	4/5 stars
New Release Tuesday	4.5/5 stars 4/5 stars

Signaling in a four star review by HM Magazine, where their editor Doug Van Pelt rated it three and a half stars, Matt Conner recognizes the band, "are now savvy rock veterans comfortable in their artistic skin... [sounding] so slick and polished... [on] an expansive, inventive rock and roll affair... [and this] is a band realizing exactly what they're capable of." Both Jesus Freak Hideout reviewers gave four and a half star ratings, where David Goodman realizes, "The sum of On The Run is the progression... [because] The foundation is laid - and obvious - but the layers of the 'new' accentuate the strengths of the 'old,' rather than abandon them entirely", and this is why Roger Gelwicks regards, "On the Run is a triumph that never overstays its welcome." Kim Jones, mentioning in a four star review from About.com, reports, "Good music, regardless of the style, is as timeless as it is appealing to all ages."

Specifying in a four and a half star review for New Release Tuesday, Kevin Davis declares, "This album is by far the catchiest, most energetic and emotionally engaging alternative rock album" of 2012. Sarah Fine, diverges just a tad in a four star review at New Release Tuesday, describes, "The album can get lyrically sketchy at times, leaving almost too much room for personal interpretation, but regardless, listeners will repeatedly take away a solid message." Indicating in a four star review from Indie Vision Music, Sara Walz tells she, "missed the 'old Children 18:3' without realizing that it's still there, it's just shinier. They spread their proverbial wings for this release and created an album that is as unique as they are." Jono Davies, expressing in a four star review by Louder Than the Music, depicts, "if you like your music a little bit edgy and raw (in a good way), then my friends, welcome to one of the best punk rock bands around at the moment. They also know how to write a catchy melody as well!"

== Track listing ==
No.	Title	Length
1.	"Moment to Moment"	2:40
2.	"Bandits"	2:40
3.	"We'll Never Say Goodbye"	4:07
4.	"What About Justice"	4:00
5.	"Jenny"	3:30
6.	"Always on the Run"	3:51
7.	"I Tried to Do the Right Thing"	3:47
8.	"Holding On"	3:18
9.	"Why Are You Afraid of the Dark (featuring Christian Lindskog of Blindside)"	3:50
10.	"Nowhere to Run"	3:09
11.	"All in Your Head"	3:26
12.	"Drifter"	1:29
Total length:		39:47

== Charts ==
Chart (2012)	Peak position
US Top Christian Albums (Billboard)	28
US Heatseekers Albums (Billboard)	27
