= Come In =

Studio album by Children 18:3
- Released: April 21, 2015
- Genre: Christian punk, punk rock
- Length: 35:33
- Label: Tooth & Nail

Children 18:3 chronology
On the Run (2012)	Come In (2015)

Come In is the fourth and final studio album by Children 18:3, released on April 21, 2015 on Tooth & Nail Records. The album was funded via a Kickstarter project.

== Critical reception ==
Professional ratings
Review scores
Source	Rating
HM Magazine	4.5/5 stars
Jesus Freak Hideout	4/5 stars

Awarding the album four and a half stars at HM Magazine, Ben Rickaby stated, "Come In is an inspiringly appropriate sendoff". In five four star reviews by Jesus Freak Hideout, Roger Gelwicks wrote, "Come In is a more than fitting finale for this exceptional trio"; Nathaniel Schexnayder wrote, "The one sure thing is this: the trio brings one last, strong punk-inspired rock project into an underserved genre in Christian music", and Scott Fryberger wrote, "The crowd-funded Come In is a strong effort, and it's everything you'd expect from the band: a lot of energy and passion, with some anti-formulaic approaches to punk rock." Kevin Davis described it in a review for New Release Tuesday as a "most meaningful" album because the music has "emotive vocals and harmonies layered over one catchy and meaningful song after another" where "Children 18:3 saved their best for last."

== Track listing ==
Come In track listing
No.	Title	Length
1.	"Come In"	2:01
2.	"Bethlehem"	3:58
3.	"Afterall"	3:14
4.	"Hold Your Breath"	2:53
5.	"Don't Stop Moving"	3:43
6.	"Because of You"	2:59
7.	"For This We Ride"	2:44
8.	"Let There Be Light"	2:48
9.	"Watch Over Me"	3:03
10.	"Great Big World"	3:13
11.	"Long Ride Home"	4:26
12.	"Red Fire" (bonus)	2:56
Total length:		35:33
