= Unbreakable (MyChildren MyBride album) =

Studio album by MyChildren MyBride
- Released: February 26, 2008
- Recorded: 2007
- Length: 38:38
- Label: Solid State
- Producer: Joey Sturgis

MyChildren MyBride chronology
Demo EP (2007)	Unbreakable (2008)	Lost Boy (2010)

Professional ratings
Review scores
Source	Rating
AllMusic	positive
Jesus Freak Hideout	3.5/5 stars

Unbreakable is the debut studio album by American metalcore band MyChildren MyBride. The album was produced by Joey Sturgis and mixed by Adam Dutkiewicz. It was released on February 26, 2008 through Solid State Records.

== Track listing ==
No.	Title	Length
1.	"Faithless"	3:50
2.	"On Wings of Integrity"	2:41
3.	"The Machinist"	4:04
4.	"Headshot!" (featuring Chad Ruhlig)	3:30
5.	"Boris the Blade"	4:31
6.	"Severance"	4:22
7.	"Versus"	2:44
8.	"Waves of Oppression"	4:09
9.	"Circle the Sky"	4:26
10.	"Choke"	4:21
Total length:		38:38

== Personnel ==
MyChildren MyBride

- Robert Bloomfield – guitar
- Matthew Hasting – vocals
- Brian Hood – drums, bass, guitar, orchestra production, piano programming
- Kyle Ray – guitar

Additional contributors

- Joey Sturgis – production, engineering, orchestra production, piano programming
- Adam Dutkiewicz – mixing
- Troy Glessner – mastering
- Chad Ruhlig – guest vocals on "Headshot!"
