= Children 18:3 (album) =

Studio album by Children 18:3
- Released: February 26, 2008
- Genre: Punk rock, Christian punk
- Length: 36:51
- Label: Tooth & Nail
- Producer: Steve Wilson

Children 18:3 chronology
Songs of Desperation EP (2006)	Children 18:3 (2008)	Rain's a Comin' (2010)

Professional ratings
Review scores
Source	Rating
Jesus Freak Hideout	5/5 stars
AllMusic	3.5/5 stars
HM Magazine	4.5/5 stars

Children 18:3 is the self-titled debut album released by Children 18:3. Christian music website Jesus Freak Hideout gave the album five out of five stars, citing its music as "raw and refined, introspective and fun, emotional and spiritual" and "the best surprise you've gotten in years."

"LCM" is about the film The Bourne Identity (2002 film). It stands for "Last chance, Marie," the words Jason Bourne says to Marie before she decides to stay with him as he runs from the police and the agents after him.

== Track listing ==
All songs written and composed by David Hostetter, Jr. except where noted.

1. "All My Balloons" – 2:16
2. "LCM" – 2:16
3. "You Know We're All So Fond of Dying" – 2:48
4. "Search Warrant" – 2:21
5. "Even Sleeping" (Captain/David Hostetter, Jr.) – 3:17
6. "Ditches" – 3:17
7. "The City" – 2:50
8. "Homemade Valentine" (David Hostetter, Jr./Lee Marie Hostetter) – 2:30
9. "Samantha" – 0:55
10. "Mock the Music" – 2:59
11. "A Chance to Say Goodbye" – 2:58
12. "Time and Wasted Bullets" – 3:15
13. "Balloons (Reprise)" – 0:36
14. "Final" – 4:40
15. "Who They Are" (iTunes bonus track) – 3:21

== Personnel ==
- David Hostetter, Jr. – vocals, guitar
- Lee Marie Hostetter – bass guitar, vocals
- Seth Hostetter – drums
