= These Are My Sins =

Studio album by I, the Breather
- Released: December 7, 2010
- Genre: Metalcore
- Length: 42:55
- Label: Sumerian
- Producer: Durv Viswanathan

I, the Breather chronology
| These Are My Sins (2010) | Truth and Purpose (2012) |

Professional ratings
Review scores
| Source | Rating |
|---|---|
| Alternative Press | 3/5 stars |
| Jesus Freak Hideout | 3.5/5 stars |

These Are My Sins is the first studio album by I, the Breather. The album was released on December 7, 2010 through Sumerian Records.

== Track listing ==
| No. | Title | Length |
|---|---|---|
| 1. | "Forgiven" | 4:12 |
| 2. | "The Common Good" | 3:58 |
| 3. | "Destroyer" | 3:42 |
| 4. | "High Rise" | 3:59 |
| 5. | "Longevity" | 3:23 |
| 6. | "Doomsday" | 3:42 |
| 7. | "Conquer" (featuring Dustin Davidson of August Burns Red) | 4:23 |
| 8. | "Empathy" (instrumental) | 2:51 |
| 9. | "Crown Me King" | 3:39 |
| 10. | "Allspark" | 2:55 |
| 11. | "Illuminate" | 6:10 |
| Total length: | | 42:55 |

== Band members ==
I, The Breather

- Shawn Spann – lead vocals
- Jered Youngbar – guitar
- Justin Huffman – guitar
- Armand Jasari – bass
- Morgan Wright – drums
