= Murray Hill Theatre =

Coordinates: 30.3128°N 81.7188°W

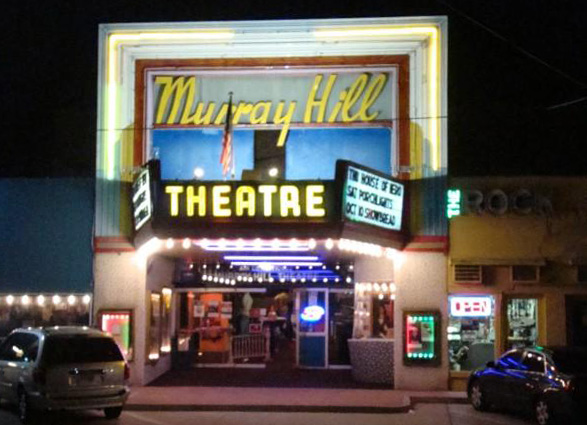
- Exterior of venue in 2009
- Interactive map of Murray Hill Theatre
- Address: 932 Edgewood Ave S Jacksonville, FL 32205-5341
- Location: Murray Hill
- Owner: Murray Hill Ministries
- Capacity: 598

Construction
- Opened: January 8, 1949
- Architect: William Marshall

Website
- Venue Website

The Murray Hill Theatre is a Christian music venue located in the Murray Hill neighborhood of Jacksonville, Florida. It is an independent, 501(c) non-profit charitable organization that is not affiliated with any church or denomination.

It first opened as a west side movie theater in 1949 until becoming a Christian music venue in 1995. It is the longest-running live music venue and nightclub in Jacksonville.

== Overview ==
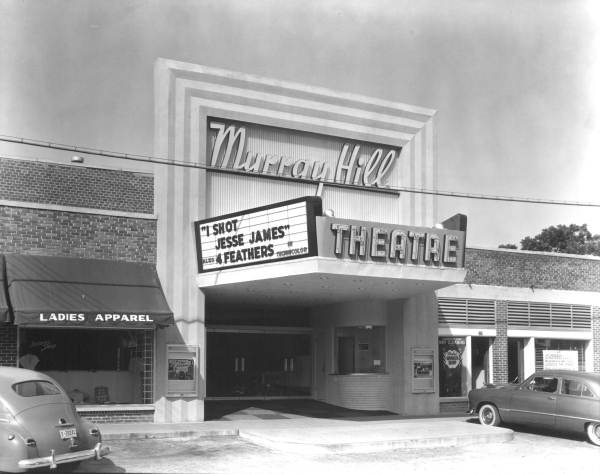
Murray Hill Theatre in 1949.

Murray Hill Theatre first opened in 1949 with Mayor W. Haydon Burns making an appearance for the opening gala. The first movie featured at the theatre was Red River. In 1994 the theatre became an industrial goth club called The Dungeon. In 1995 Tony Nasrallah purchased the theatre and transformed it into a Christian nightclub as a safe alternative to the bar and nightclub scene today. The Murray Hill neighborhood in 1995 was also in decline with crime rates rising and low property values on the rise. Nashrallah's vision of transforming the Murray Hill Theatre into a Christian nightclub was not only for the youth but also as the start of revitalization of the Murray Hill neighborhood.

Since 1995, the Murray Hill Theatre has put on almost 2,000 live music events and concerts hosting the likes of Switchfoot, Jars of Clay, P.O.D., Family Force 5, the Almost, John Mark McMillan and countless other artists. Not only does it have music acts but also an annual City-Wide Prom and Swing Night. Other annual events include its anniversary show to commemorate its long existence as a music venue and the Scream the Prayer Tour. Murray Hill Theatre is considered to be the nation's premier Christian rock venue.

In July 2015 a coffee shop called Vagabond Coffee opened in the previously-occupied Murray Hill Theatre Cafe which is still owned by Murray Hill Ministries.

== Gallery of performances ==
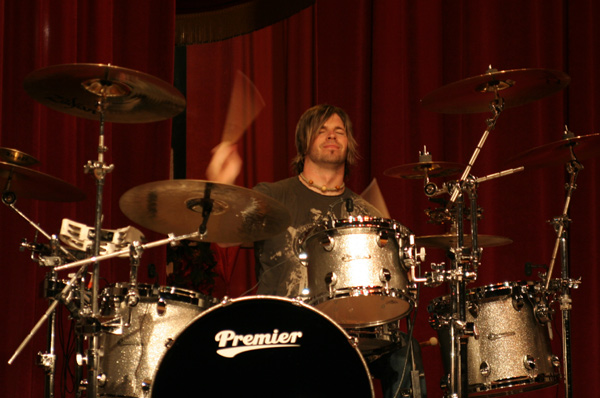
DecembeRadio (2008)

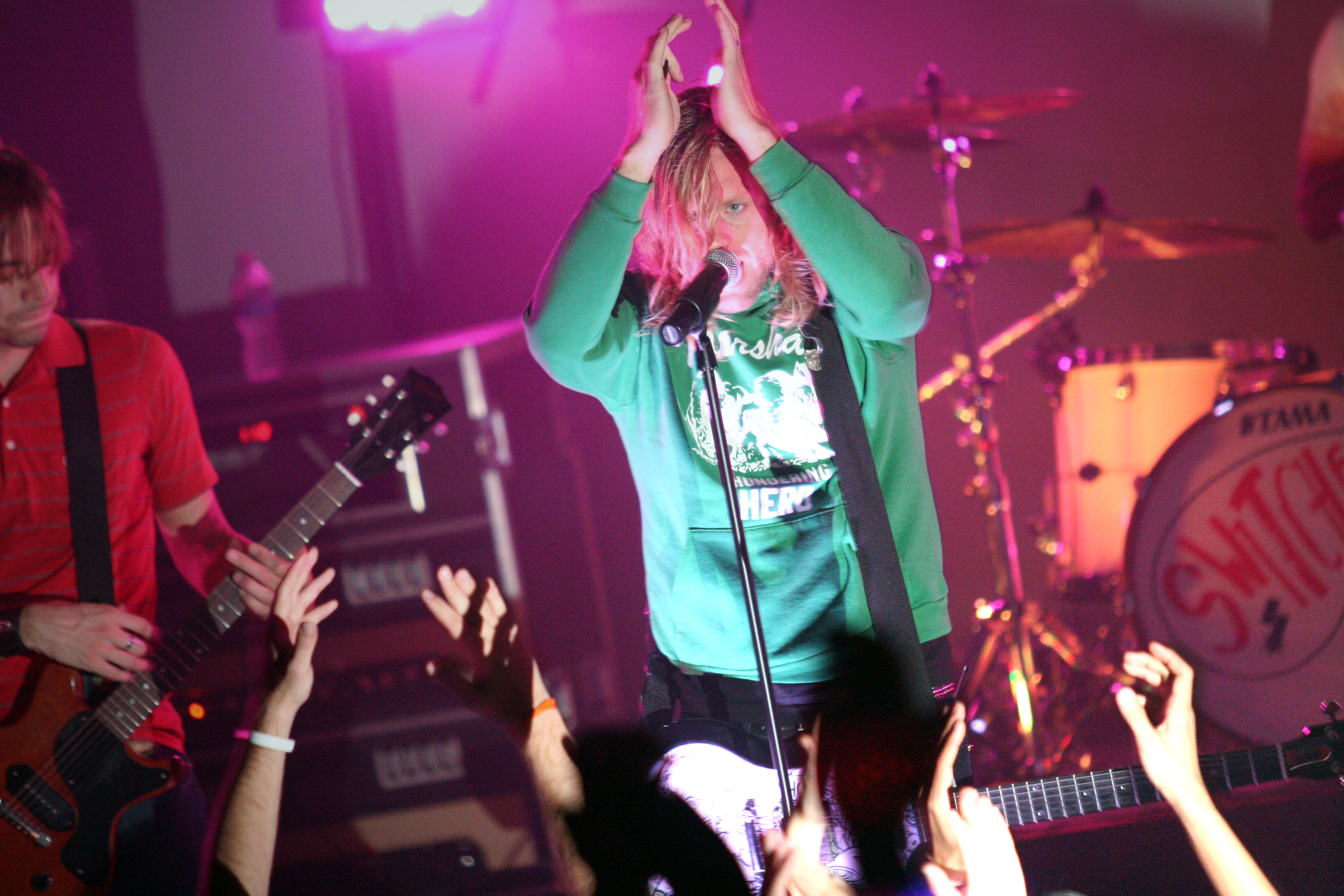
Switchfoot (2008)

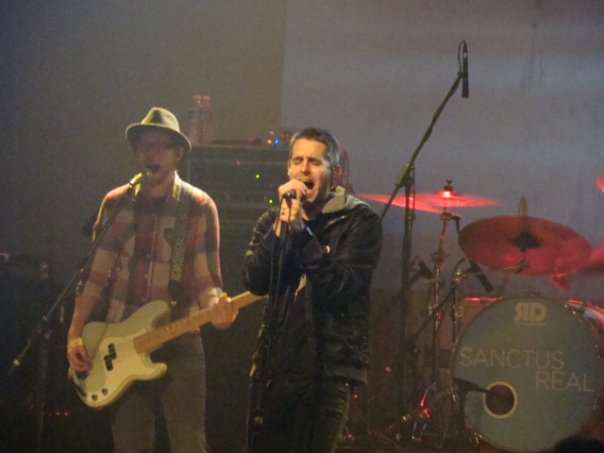
Sanctus Real (2009)

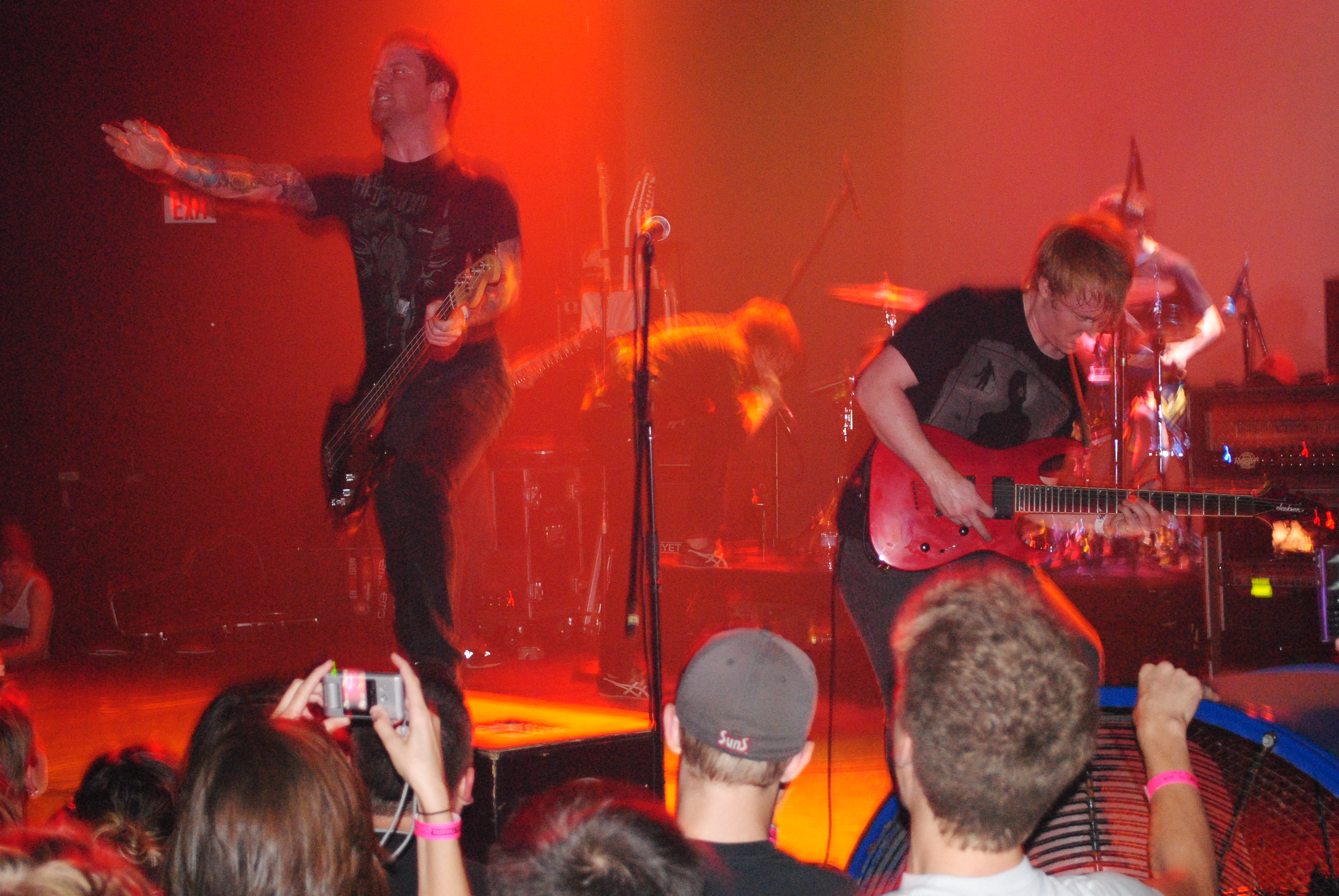
Oh, Sleeper (2010)

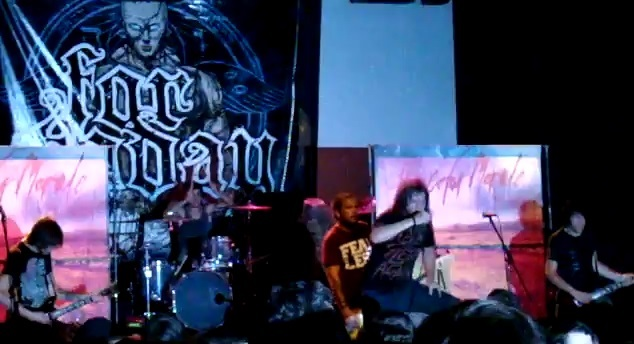
The Color Morale (2011)

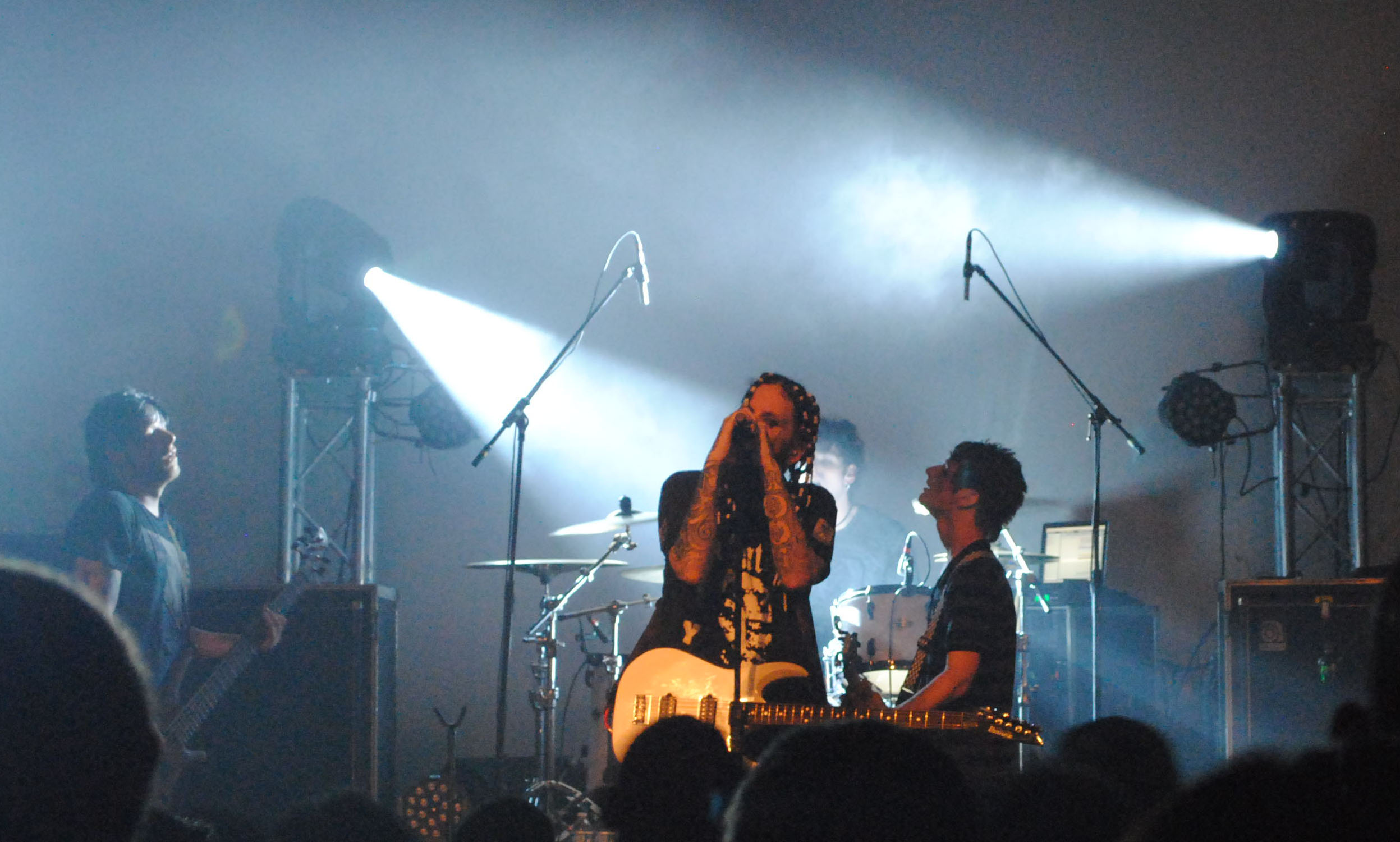
Brian "Head" Welch of Korn (2011)

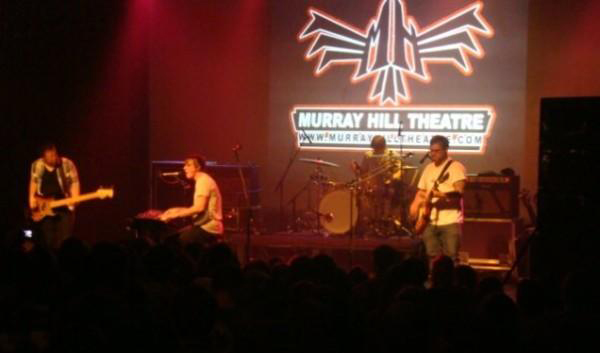
Between the Trees (2011)

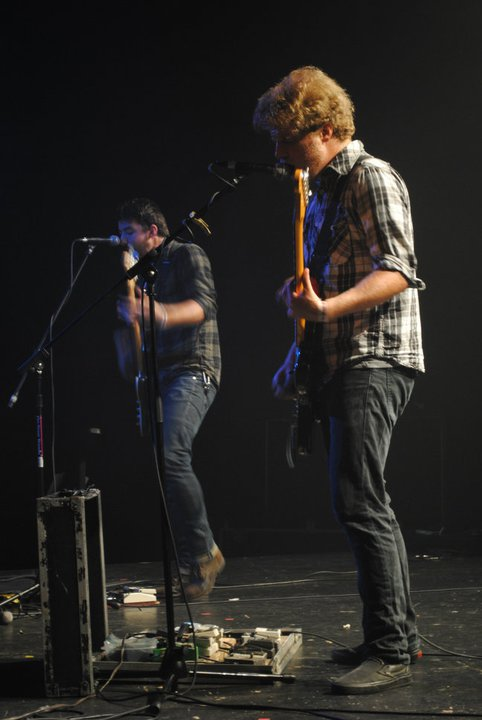
My Epic (2011)

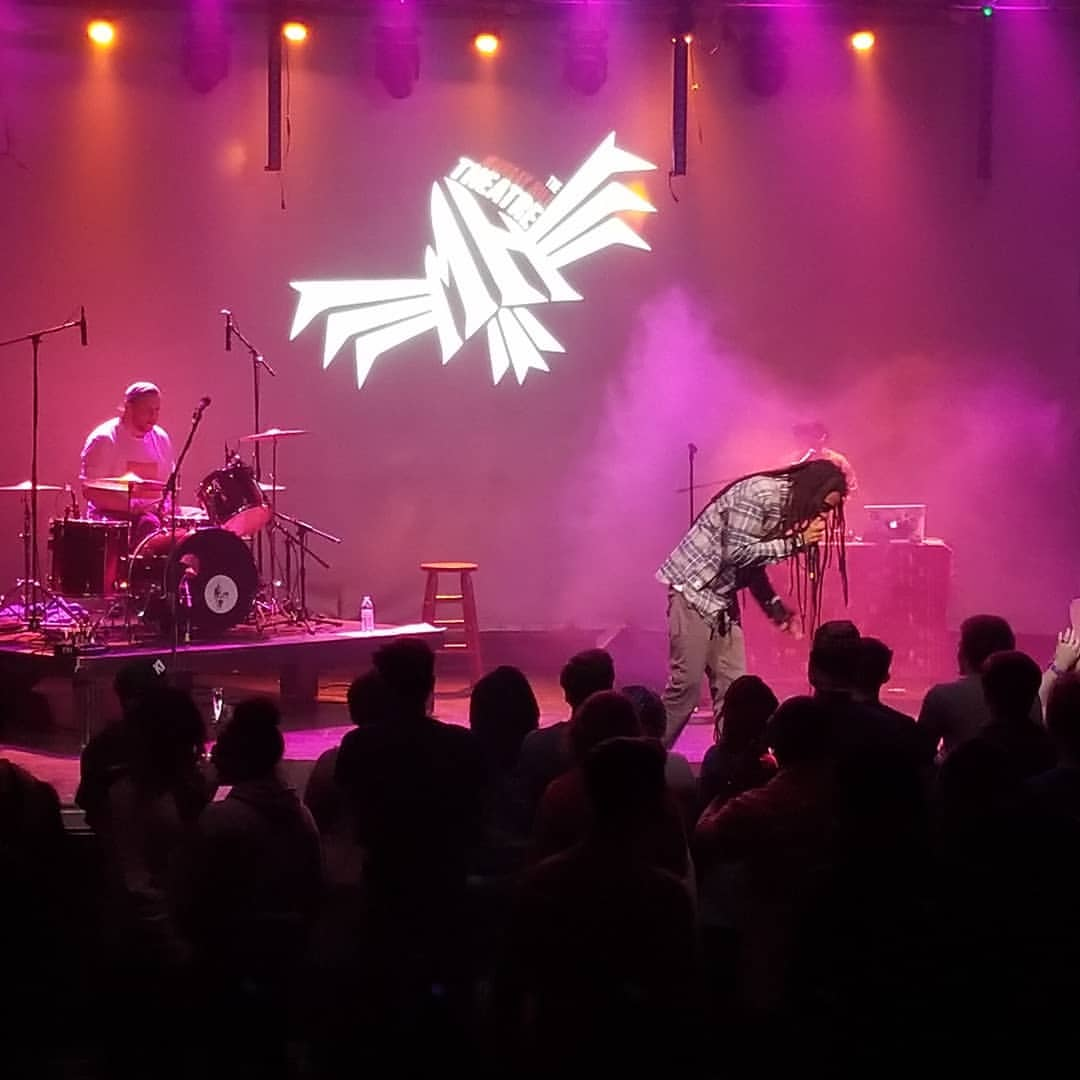
Propaganda (2018)
