= Corpus Christi (band) =

American Christian metalcore band

- Also known as: Skintrade (2002–2006)
- Origin: Cincinnati, Ohio, USA
- Genres: Metalcore, Christian metal, melodic death metal
- Years active: 2002–2016
- Label: Victory Records
- Members: Jarrod Christman; Max O'Connell; Steph Roat
- Past members: Justin Evans; Chris Towning; Will Henry; Jon Pauly; Phil Smith; Andrew Poling; Derek Ayres; Caleb Rhoads; Tyler Jameson; Aaron Strickland; Joshua Tolle; Dustin White; Jacob Tolle; Branden Meade; Steven Elliott; Kenton Bailey; Landon Lockwood
- Website: Corpus Christi on Myspace

Corpus Christi was an American Christian metal band from Cincinnati, Ohio. The term "Corpus Christi" is Latin for "body of Christ," which fits the band's Christian lyrics. They were signed to Victory Records. The band has been featured on TVU's weekly countdown show, TVU's Most Wanted.

== History ==
=== The Darker Shades of White (2009–2010) ===
Corpus Christi titled their debut album The Darker Shades of White and released it on Victory Records. One song from the album, "Fight for Your King", received a music video. Halfway through the 2009 Scream the Prayer Tour, original drummer Justin Evans unexpectedly left the band and Aaron Eckermann, drummer from the Christian metal band A Plea For Purging, filled in for the rest of the tour. Following the tour, the band found a replacement drummer, Peter Keres. Vocalist Will Henry left the band and former Agraceful vocalist Chris Roetter filled in as the vocalist for the remaining shows on the tours.

=== A Feast for Crows (2010–2012) ===
On June 29, the band released the first single, called "Monuments", off of the new album, titled A Feast for Crows. The album was released by Victory Records on July 6, 2010. Guitarist and vocalist Jarrod Christman was the only remaining member from their first release The Darker Shades of White.

=== Unreleased album and inactivity (2012–2016) ===
In February 2012, vocalist Max O'Connell said the band was currently writing their newest album. On their Facebook page, the band said the new album should be out in either the Fall or Winter 2012. In December 2013, the band released a demo song entitled "The Glorious". The song suggested a heavier, grittier sound for their forthcoming album. As of January 2025, however, no new album has been released.

In May 2016, the band released another demo song titled "Sons of a Dynasty", after three years of silence. Corpus Christi played its first show in two years with Spirit and the Bride, Silence the Ocean and other local acts on September 9, 2016, reuniting with drummer Andy Poling who played on the A Feast for Crows album. The band's social media pages have been inactive since 2016 and no new music or tours have been announced, indicating that the band is inactive. The band's label also uses past tense to refer to the band, furthering that indication.

== Band members ==
Current

- Jarrod Christman - rhythm guitar, clean vocals (2002–2016), lead guitar (2014–2016)
- Max O'Connell - lead vocals (2009–2016), bass (2009–2010)
- Steph Roat - bass (Glassworld) (2012–2016)

Live

- Andy Poling - drums (2009–2012; live 2016) (Orca)

Former members

- Dustin White - drums (2002-2007)
- Brian Cash – drums (2007) (ex–Beneath The Sky)
- Justin Evans – drums (2007–2009) (Fall of Babylon)
- Chris Towning – bass (2002–2008) (ex–Suffocate Faster, Bury Your Dead, ex–Too Pure To Die, DevilDriver)
- Will Henry – lead vocals (2006–2009)
- Chris Roetter – lead vocals (ex–Agraceful, ex–Emarosa, Like Moths To Flames (2009)
- Jon Pauly – lead guitar (2002–2009)
- Phil Smith – bass (2008–2009)
- Tyler Jameson – drums (2012–2014)
- Brian Maier Jr. – lead vocals (2002–2006)
- Caleb Rhoads – bass (2009–2012)
- Derek Ayres – lead guitar (2009–2012) (Orca)
- Aaron Strickland – lead guitar (2012–2014)
- Peter Keres – drums (2009)
- Aaron Eckerman – drums (A Plea for Purging) (2009)

Timeline

== Discography ==
Studio albums

Released	Title	Label(s)
February 17, 2009	The Darker Shades of White	Victory Records
July 6, 2010	A Feast For Crows	Victory Records

Studio EPs

Released	Title	Label(s)
2007	It's Always Darkest Before the Dawn	(independent)

Music videos

Year	Title
2009	"Fight for Your King"
2010	"Monuments"

Singles

Song	Year	Album
"The Glorious"	2014	Non-album single
"Sons of a Dynasty"	2016	Non-album single
