= Truth and Purpose =

Studio album by I, The Breather
- Released: February 28, 2012
- Genre: Metalcore
- Length: 34:47
- Label: Sumerian
- Producer: Paul Leavitt

I, The Breather chronology
These Are My Sins (2010)	Truth and Purpose (2012)	Life Reaper (2014)

Singles from Truth and Purpose
- 1. "Bruised & Broken" Released: January 24, 2012

Professional ratings
Review scores
Source	Rating
About.com	3.5/5 stars
Jesus Freak Hideout	5/5 stars

Truth and Purpose is the second album by I, The Breather. The album was released on February 28, 2012, through Sumerian Records. The video for the song "False Profit" was released on May 4, 2012.

== Track listing ==
No.	Title	Length
1.	"False Profit"	4:35
2.	"The "Beginning""	3:16
3.	"Bruised & Broken"	3:48
4.	"Mentalist (feat. Micah Kinard of Oh, Sleeper)"	3:20
5.	"Meaning (Victory)"	3:57
6.	"Lunar"	2:33
7.	"Knights & Pawns"	3:01
8.	"Judgement"	3:56
9.	"Rephaim"	2:57
10.	"4.12.11"	3:24
Total length:		34:47

== Members ==
I The Breather

- Shawn Spann – lead vocals
- Chase Kozlowski – guitar, backing vocals
- Justin Huffman – guitar
- Armand Jasari – bass
- Morgan Wright – drums
