= A Feast for Crows (album) =

Studio album by Corpus Christi
- Released: July 6, 2010
- Recorded: May 2010
- Genre: Metalcore, Christian metal
- Length: 43:32
- Label: Victory
- Producer: Shane Frisby

Corpus Christi chronology
The Darker Shades of White (2009)	A Feast for Crows (2010)

Professional ratings
Review scores
Source	Rating
AllMusic	3/5 stars
Jesus Freak Hideout	3/5 stars
The New Review	4.5/5 stars
Indie Vision Music	5/10 stars
Review Rinse Repeat	1.5/5 stars

A Feast for Crows is the second full-length studio album released by the Christian metal band Corpus Christi. The album was released by Victory Records on July 6, 2010. It hosts a whole new lineup, aside from the only remaining member of the band previously, the rhythm guitarist and clean vocalist, Jarrod Christman. This includes Andrew Poling on drums, Caleb Rhodes on bass, Derek Ayres on lead guitar, and the harsh vocals of Max O'Connell. The album features a new sound different from The Darker Shades of White, sounding similar to bands such as Bury Your Dead. Corpus Christi promoted their album on tour with bands like Divide the Sea, Judges, Thoughts In Reverse, and With Words.

== Track listing ==
No.	Title	Length
1.	"The Red Horse Is Upon Us" (Intro)	1:39
2.	"A Portrait of Modern Greed"	3:49
3.	"Monuments"	3:56
4.	"Betrayed Redemption"	4:28
5.	"Little Miss Let You Know"	4:22
6.	"Windwalker" (Interlude)	2:12
7.	"Broken Man"	4:30
8.	"Blood In The Water"	5:19
9.	"Invictus"	4:42
10.	"(Seeing You Again) For The First Time"	5:20
11.	"Shepherds In Sheep’s Clothing"	3:19
Total length:		43:32

== Personnel ==
- Andrew Poling – drums
- Jarrod Christman – rhythm guitar, clean vocals
- Caleb Rhoads – bass
- Derek Ayres – lead guitar
- Max O'Connell – harsh vocals
