= Rain's a Comin' =

Rain's 'A Comin'

Studio album by Children 18:3
- Released: June 29, 2010
- Studio: Dark Horse Studios, Franklin, TN; Legion of Boom Studio, Nashville, TN
- Genre: Punk rock, Christian punk
- Length: 33:23
- Label: Tooth & Nail
- Producer: Brandon Ebel

Children 18:3 chronology
Children 18:3 (2008)	Rain's 'A Comin' (2010)	On the Run (2012)

Professional ratings
Review scores
Source	Rating
Jesus Freak Hideout	4.5/5 stars

Rain's 'A Comin' is the second album released by Children 18:3. Christian music website Jesus Freak Hideout named Children 18:3's upcoming project as the website's fourth most anticipated album of the year. In 2009 and 2010, they frequently played unreleased songs on tour, including "Jack O Lantern Dreams", "Cover Your Eyes", "Evonne", "The Whispering Well", "The Carnival", "Whispering" and "Oh, Honestly!" Many of these songs made it onto the new album, which the band began recording in mid-December 2009 in Nashville. Rain's A Comin' was made available for a listening party on Jesus Freak Hideout on June 22, 2010. The album was released on June 29, 2010 with a music video for "Cover Your Eyes" was released on June 30, 2010.

After recording the album, Children 18:3 briefly toured Minnesota, North Dakota, and South Dakota with former Korn guitarist Brian Head Welch in April 2010.

The album peaked at #23 on the Billboard Heatseekers Albums chart during July 2010.

== Track listing ==
1. Rain's 'A Comin' – 1:42
2. Cover Your Eyes – 2:09
3. The Cruel One – 2:41
4. Whispering – 1:08
5. Hey Driftwood (Tides) – 4:04
6. Oh Bravo – 3:12
7. Oh Honestly – 3:01
8. Wonder I – 3:12
9. Stronger – 3:34
10. Jack 'O' Lantern Dreams – 2:09
11. Lost So Long – 4:51
12. The Last Laugh – 1:36

== Personnel ==
- David Hostetter, Jr. – vocals, guitar
- Lee Marie Hostetter – bass guitar, vocals, backing vocals
- Seth Hostetter – drums
