= Children 18:3 =

Christian punk-rock band from Minnesota

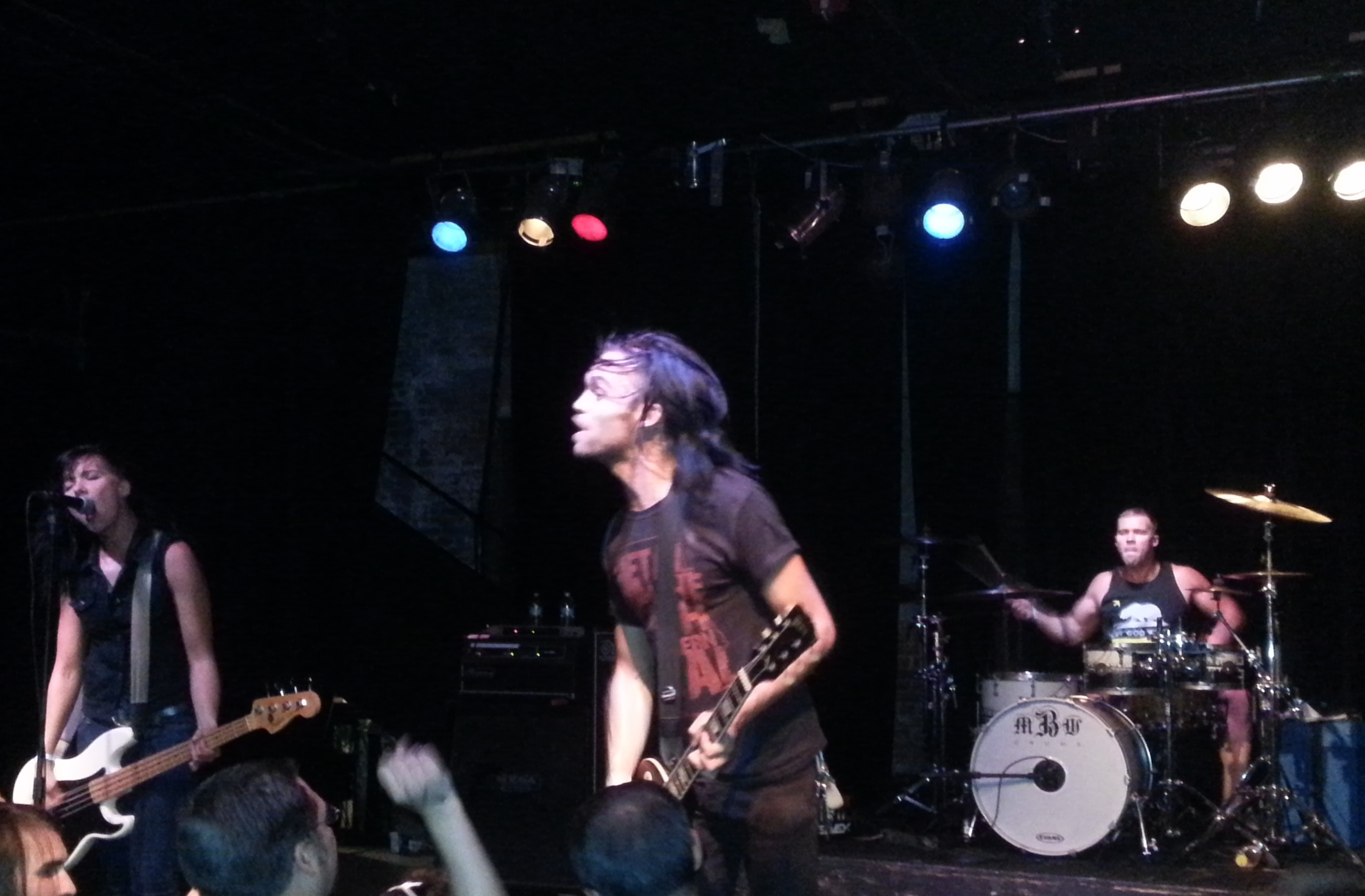

Background information
- Origin: Morris, Minnesota united states
- Genres: Punk rock, Christian punk
- Years active: 1999–present
- Label: Tooth & Nail
- Members: David Hostetter; Lee Marie Hostetter; Seth Hostetter
- Website: Children 18:3 on Facebook

Children 18:3 is an American Christian punk band from Morris, Minnesota. Formed in 1999, the band consists of homeschooled siblings David (vocals/guitar), Lee Marie (vocals/bass), and Seth Hostetter (drums). Since signing to Tooth & Nail Records in 2007, the band has released four albums, Children 18:3 (2008), Rain's a Comin' (2010), On the Run (2012), and Come In (2015).

== History ==
=== Formation, signing to Tooth & Nail, and self-titled album (1999–2008) ===
Children 18:3 was originally formed in 1999 as a five-piece ska band, with David on guitar, Seth on drums, and some friends that played bass guitar, trumpet, and saxophone. In a later interview with HM Magazine, David admitted, "It wasn't like we wanted to be a ska band. It's just that our friends, who wanted to play horns, wanted to play with us. So it was like, 'Okay, we'll be a ska band.' It wasn't like a conscious decision." The three friends ultimately left the band in 2001 and, after going through several replacement bassists, David and Seth settled on their sister, Lee Marie, a year later. Now adopting a punk rock sound, the band recorded their first EP, Places I Don't Want To Go, in 2004 to sell at local shows. Around the same time, the band entered the local Club 3 Degrees' annual Music Tournament competition, and in 2005, they were awarded the grand prize of free recording time at Winterland Studios in Minneapolis. The band used this opportunity to record a second EP, Songs of Desperation, investing their own money when they had used up the allotted time. The band released the EP in 2006 and sent a copy to Tooth & Nail Records CEO Brandon Ebel. Ebel, having already taken a liking to the band as one of the judges at the Music Tournament, signed the band in January 2008. The band released their self-titled debut, Children 18:3, on February 26, 2008.

During Cornerstone Festival 2008 - the band performed 2 different sets, the first on Tooth And Nail day was similar to most sets they had been performing, but the Wednesday set featured the older songs "Don't Even Try" and "The Cowboy Song" and a brand new song entitled "Oh Honestly" that had been written since the album came out.

In October 2008 they supported Norma Jean on The Anti-Mother Tour, along with Haste the Day, Mychildren Mybride, Oh, Sleeper, and The Showdown.

=== Rain's a Comin' (2008–2010) ===
Jesus Freak Hideout named Children 18:3's upcoming project as the website's fourth most anticipated album of the year. In 2009 and 2010, they frequently played unreleased songs on tour, including "Jack O' Lantern Dreams", "Cover Your Eyes", "Evonne", "The Whispering Well", "The Carnival", "Whispering" and "Oh, Honestly!" Many of these songs made it into the new album, which the band began recording in mid-December 2009 in Nashville.

After recording the album, Children 18:3 briefly toured Minnesota, North Dakota, and South Dakota with Brian "Head" Welch and The Classic Crime for the LifeLight Music Festival in April 2010.

On June 22, 2010, Rain's a Comin' was made available for a listening party on Jesus Freak Hideout. The album was released on June 29, 2010.

On June 30, 2010, the music video for "Cover Your Eyes" was released. The band was also said to be recording a music video filmed by members of Showbread.

=== On the Run (2010–2015) ===
Children 18:3 spent much of late 2011/early 2012 in the studio recording what would become their third album for Tooth and Nail/ EMI Records, titled, On the Run, with pre-orders arriving on their website in early May. The album's release date was set for June 19.

=== Come In (2015) ===
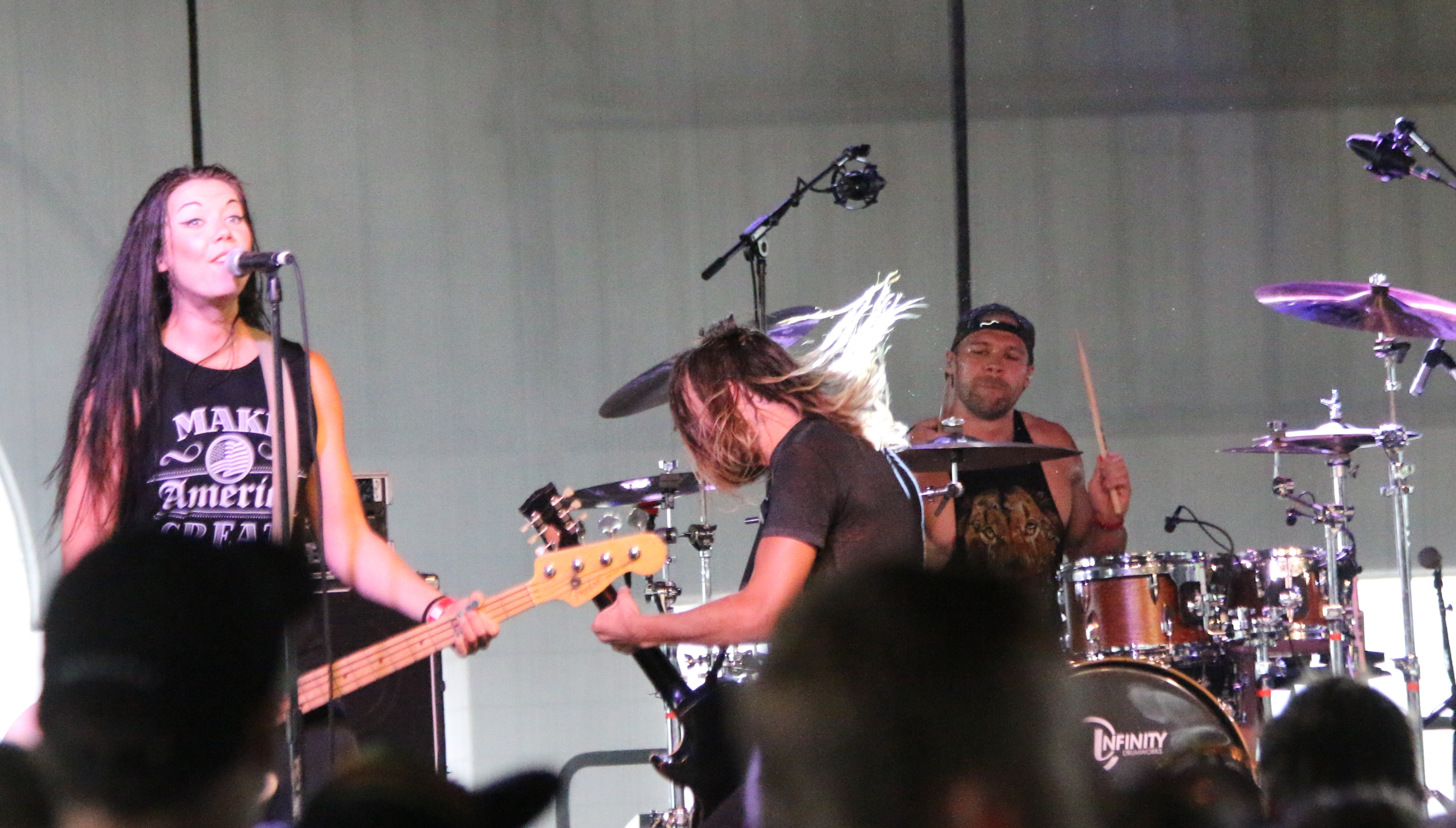
Children 18:3 performing at Lifest 2017

On April 21, 2015, the band released their album, Come In.

=== Future ===
Though the band stated that Come In would be their final album, they continue to play shows and maintain a page on Facebook.

Beginning in 2020, frontman David Hostetter released a number of singles as David Hostetter Jr.

== Band members ==
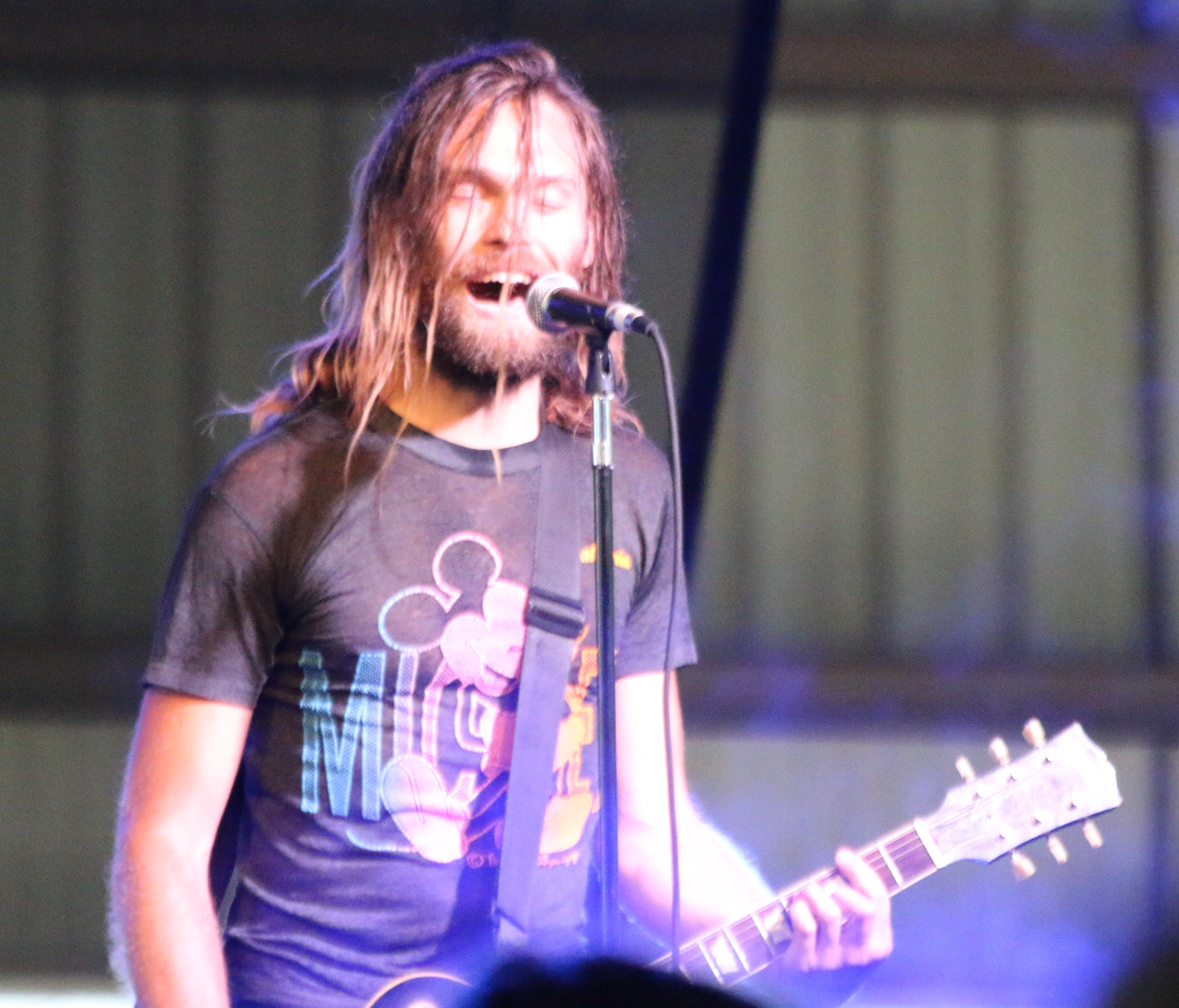
David Hostetter – lead vocals, guitar

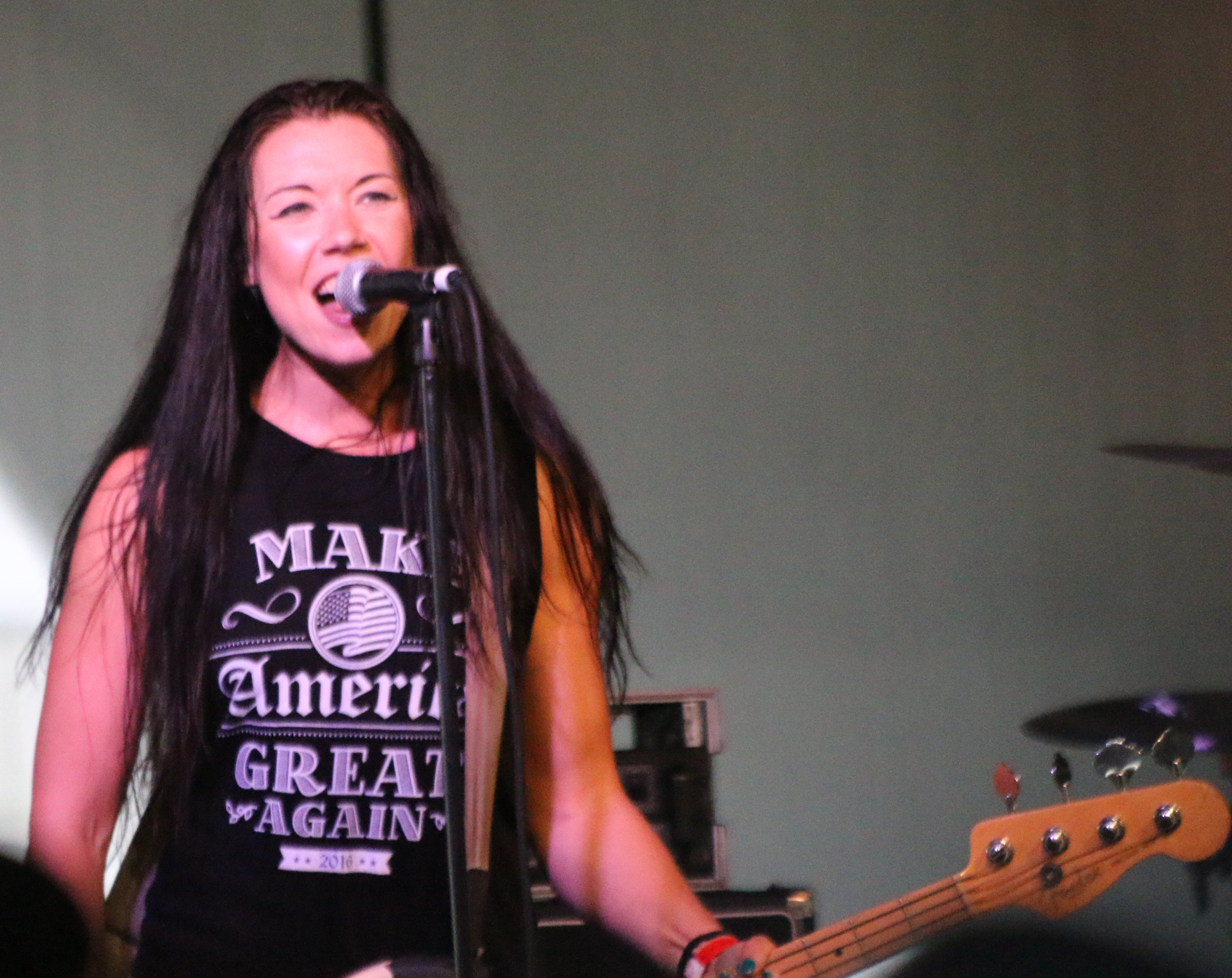
Lee Marie Hostetter – lead vocals, bass

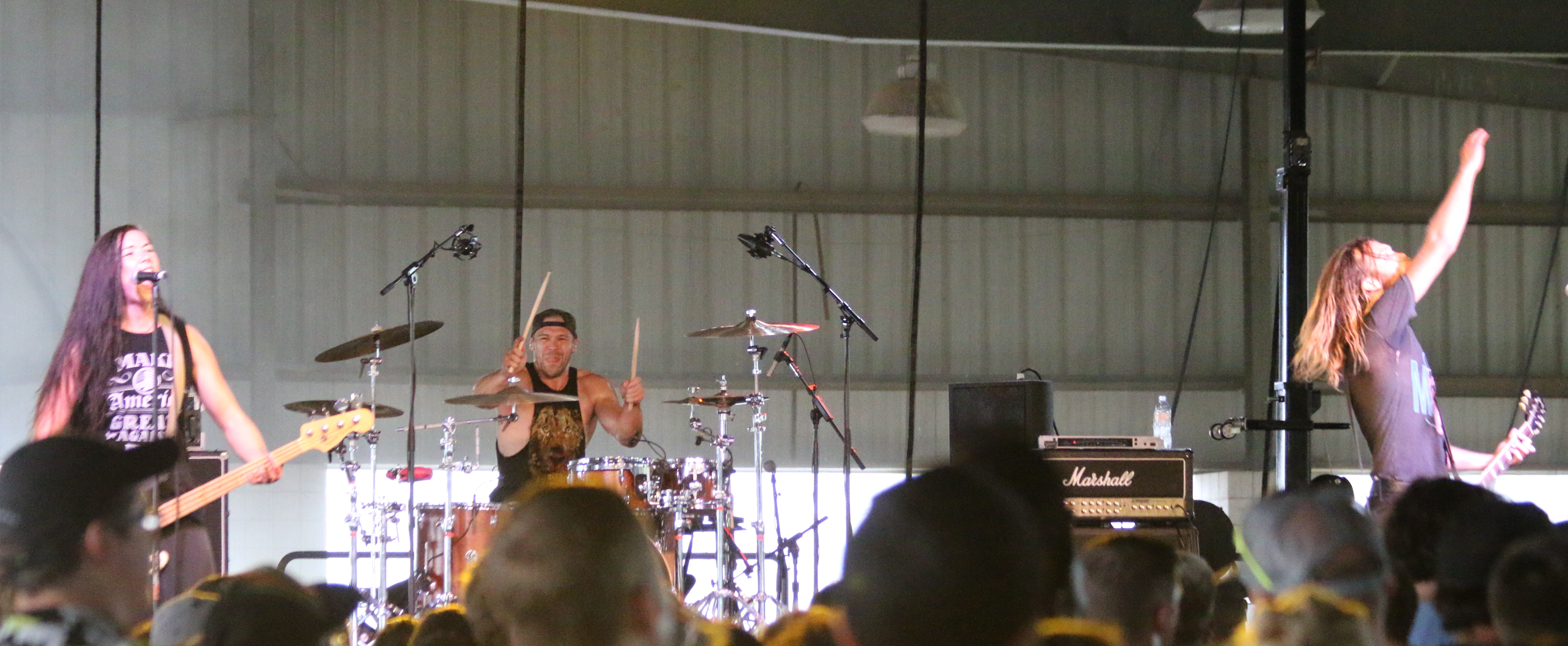
Seth Hostetter – drums

== Discography ==
=== Studio albums ===
Title	Details	Peak chart positions	
Title	Details	US Christ	US Heat
Children 18:3	Released: January 1, 2008; Label: Tooth and Nail Records	—	—
Rain's a Comin'	Released: January 1, 2010; Label: Tooth and Nail	24	23
On the Run	Released: January 1, 2012; Label: Tooth and Nail	28	27
Come In	Released: April 21, 2015; Label: Tooth and Nail	—	—
"—" denotes a recording that did not chart or was not released in that territory.

=== Extended plays ===
Title	Details
Places I Don't Want to Go	Released: 2004; Label: Independent
Songs of Deperation	Released: 2006; Label: Independent
"—" denotes a recording that did not chart or was not released in that territory.

=== Singles ===
Title	Year	Peak Chart Positions	Album
Title	Year	US Christ Rock	Album
"LCM"	2007	—	Children 18:3
"You Know We're All So Fond of Dying"	2008	—	Children 18:3
"All My Balloons"	2008	—	Children 18:3
"Mock the Music"	2009	2	Children 18:3
"A Chance to Say Goodbye"	2009	—	Children 18:3
"Cover Your Eyes"	2010	—	Rain's a Comin'
"Lost So Long"	2010	1	Rain's a Comin'
"Oh Honestly"	2010	—	Rain's a Comin'
"Oh Bravo"	2010	1	Rain's a Comin'
"Stronger"	2010	11	Rain's a Comin'
"Follow the Star"	2012	—	Non-album single
"—" denotes a recording that did not chart or was not released in that territory.

=== Music videos ===
- "All My Balloons"
- Cover Your Eyes
- Moment To Moment

=== Compilation appearances ===
- "LCM", A Not So Silent Night! – Tooth & Nail (2007)
- "All My Balloons", Songs From The Penalty Box, Tooth & Nail Volume 6 - Tooth & Nail Records (2009)
