= Hyland (band) =

American Christian rock band

- Origin: Minneapolis, Minnesota, US
- Genres: Pop rock, Christian rock
- Years active: 2006-2014-2024 present
- Label: Tooth & Nail
- Members: Jon Lewis; Mitch Hansen; Ben Early; Steve Weigel
- Past members: Matt Lennander; Tim Neff; Lee Carter

Hyland is an American Christian rock band originating from Minneapolis, Minnesota. The band released two EPs independently before signing to Tooth & Nail Records on October 25, 2010. Their debut album was released on May 3, 2011.

== Formation (2006–2009) ==
Hyland formed in 2006 in Minneapolis, Minnesota as a local Christian pop rock band. Hyland gained local attention as they traveled the state of Minnesota, and eventually the United States, and performed at local clubs and various scenes, including performing at U.S. festivals (Lifest, Sonshine, etc.), and winning a music tournament at Club 3 Degrees, which is described by the awarding organization as "nationally recognized."

During that time, Hyland released their first two EPs independently. Polyphonic Telegraph No. 1 was released on July 22, 2008 and Quotients was released on May 13, 2009.

== Record deal (2010) ==
On October 25, 2010, Tooth & Nail Records added Hyland to their artist roster. According to lead vocalist Jon Lewis, the band was preparing songs for their third independent release when musician/producer Aaron Sprinkle contacted the band and requested a personal pitch to Tooth & Nail. The request came following the discovery of the band by Sprinkle after one of his interns accidentally left one of Hyland's song samples on Sprinkle's computer without closing the program before leaving for the night. According to the band, the record label was "blown away" by Hyland's live performance and strong original songs.

After the signing, Aaron Sprinkle agreed to produce the band's debut album, Weights & Measures, which was released on May 3, 2011. The album was mixed by JR McNeely.

== National tours (2011–2014) ==
Hyland performed on the "Overcome Tour," headlined by Fireflight and featuring After Edmund and Royal Tailor. Hyland has also performed on the "Mother, May I?" Tour, with Abandon Kansas and Wavorly. The group continued playing shows into 2014.

== Media recognition ==
Aside from touring, Hyland has been the subject of an interview on The Harvest Show, a show on World Harvest Television, a nationally-broadcasting channel. Hyland is also in regular rotation on RadioU and the Northwestern Media network. Hyland's second radio single, "This Love Is Free," from their debut album, Weights & Measures, peaked at No. 29 on the Christian Songs chart published by Billboard.

== Band members ==
Current

- Jon Lewis – lead vocals, rhythm guitar
- Steve Weigel – drums

Former

- Matt Lennander – lead guitar
- Tim Neff – rhythm guitar
- Lee Carter – bass
- Mitch Hansen – lead guitar
- Ben Early – keyboards, backing vocals, additional guitar
- Josiah Erickson – bass

== Discography ==
=== Studio albums ===
Released	Title	Label(s)
May 3, 2011	Weights & Measures	Tooth & Nail Records
October 22, 2012	Finding Our Way	Tooth & Nail Records

=== Studio EPs ===
Released	Title	Label(s)
July 22, 2008	Polyphonic Telegraph No. 1	independent
May 13, 2009	Quotients (four-track preview of Weights & Measures)	independent
