= The Darker Shades of White =

Studio album by Corpus Christi
- Released: February 17, 2009
- Recorded: December 2008
- Genre: Metalcore, Christian metal
- Length: 44:42
- Label: Victory
- Producer: Ken Susi

Corpus Christi chronology
It's Always Darkest Before the Dawn EP (2007)	The Darker Shades of White (2009)	A Feast for Crows (2010)

Professional ratings
Review scores
Source	Rating
AbsolutePunk.net	7/10 stars
Jesus Freak Hideout	4.5/5 stars
Indie Vision Music	8.5/10 stars
Sputnikmusic	3.5/5 stars
Thrashmag.com	8.9/10

The Darker Shades of White is the debut full-length studio album released by the Christian metal band Corpus Christi. The album was released by Victory Records on February 17, 2009, to generally positive reviews.

== Track listing ==
All tracks are written by Corpus Christi.

No.	Title	Length
1.	"Parade of Scars"	3:37
2.	"It's Always Been Darkest Before the Dawn"	3:19
3.	"Marilyn"	4:09
4.	"Baptized in Fire"	4:50
5.	"Until the Day"	4:52
6.	"Fight for Your King"	4:19
7.	"Starry Nights, Cloudy Hearts"	4:11
8.	"Western Downfall"	4:12
9.	"The Sacrifice"	3:59
10.	"I Will Never Forget"	3:49
11.	"Prodigal"	3:25
Total length:		44:42

== Personnel ==
- Will Henry – harsh vocals
- Jarrod Christman – rhythm guitar, clean vocals
- Jon Pauly – lead guitar
- Phil Smith – bass guitar
- Justin Evans – drums

== Media recognition ==
Corpus Christi has been featured numerous times on TVU and RadioU's metal show RadioU Hardcore for their music video and hit song, "Fight for Your King."
