= Life Reaper =

Studio album by I, the Breather
- Released: July 15, 2014
- Genre: Metalcore
- Length: 37:30
- Label: Sumerian
- Producers: Ricky Armellino, I, the Breather, Grant McFarland, Carson Slovak

I, the Breather chronology
Truth and Purpose (2012)	Life Reaper (2014)

Life Reaper is the third studio album by the American metalcore group I, the Breather. It was released on July 15, 2014, by Sumerian Records. It was produced by band and Century band members Ricky Armellino, Grant McFarland, Carson Slovak.

== Background and production ==
The album is the third from the group, who began making music in 2009. I, the Breather produced the album alongside Century bandmates Ricky Armellino, Grant McFarland, Carson Slovak.

== Music style ==
Big Cheese says "they're a five-piece who can be described as metalcore with djent and progressive elements thrown in."

== Critical reception ==
Professional ratings
Review scores
Source	Rating
Big Cheese	7/10
Outburn	7/10
Revolver	4/5 stars

Life Reaper was welcomed with two positive reviews. In a four star review from Revolver, Jeff Perlah averring, "Life is good when I The Breather get down to business." Amy Sciarretto claims the project features some "metallic vigor... with real, flesh and blood passion", bequeathing the album a seven out of ten on behalf of Outburn. In a seven out of ten review by Big Cheese, Lais Martins Waring describing, "Their songs are heavy, and the combination of riffs and catchy choruses is a winning one."

== Track listing ==
Tracklist
No.	Title	Length
1.	"Setting:Sun"	3:53
2.	"Soul:Seek"	4:00
3.	"Self:Restore"	4:36
4.	"Life:Reaper"	3:30
5.	"Dear:Devil"	3:32
6.	"Swine:Cult" (featuring Ricky Armellino of This or the Apocalypse and Century)	3:09
7.	"Demon:Dreams"	3:36
8.	"Shape:Shifter"	3:34
9.	"Re:Volution"	1:40
10.	"Chain:Breaker"	2:26
11.	"Identity:Crisis"	3:34
Total length:		37:30

== Personnel ==
The credit have been adapted from AllMusic.

- I, the Breather
  - Shawn Spann – vocals
  - Chase Kozlowski – lead guitar
  - Kyle Bowman – rhythm guitar
  - Conor Hesse – bass guitar
  - Aaron Ovecka – drums
- Producer(s)
  - Ricky Armellino
  - I, the Breather
  - Grant McFarland
  - Carson Slovak
- Other musicians
  - Ricky Armellino – featured artist
- Technical
  - Grant McFarland – engineer
  - Carson Slovak – engineer
- Miscellaneous
  - Daniel McBride – artwork, layout
  - Orie McGinness – photography
  - T.D. Wehle – band photo

== Chart performance ==
Chart (2014)	Peak position
US Billboard 200	158
US Top Christian Albums (Billboard)	6
US Top Hard Rock Albums (Billboard)	14
US Independent Albums (Billboard)	27
US Top Rock Albums (Billboard)	43
