= Lost Boy (album) =

Studio album by MyChildren MyBride
- Released: June 8, 2010
- Recorded: 2009
- Studios: Glow in the Dark Studios, Atlanta, Georgia
- Genre: Metalcore
- Length: 40:43
- Label: Solid State
- Producer: Matt Goldman

MyChildren MyBride chronology
| Unbreakable (2008) | Lost Boy (2010) | MyChildren MyBride (2012) |

Professional ratings
Review scores
| Source | Rating |
|---|---|
| AllMusic | 3.5/5 stars |
| Jesus Freak Hideout | 4/5 stars |
| DecoyMusic | 3/5 stars |

Lost Boy is the second studio album by American metalcore band MyChildren MyBride. It was released on June 8, 2010 through Solid State Records. The album was recorded at Glow in the Dark Studios in Atlanta, Georgia and produced by Matt Goldman.

== Review ==
Christian metalcore outfit MyChildren MyBride's sophomore effort differs its 2008 predecessor with different approach to the genre. The basic tenets of the style (toneless screaming and staccato riffs layered over a foundation of tight, dry, double kick drum pedal bursts) are represented on Lost Boy, but the machine screw production and tone-deaf melodic structures that often accompany those parameters are not. Guitarists Robert Bloomfield and Daniel Alvarado perform basic jackhammer riffs, but they also know how to take those riffs and bend them into more melodic structures. Tracks like “Hooligans” and “Redeemer” benefit from the old-school punk gang vocals, and producer Matt Goldman (Underoath, the Chariot) allots vocalist Matthew Hasting's voice (which is effective and without "Cookie Monster" style vocals) the room it needs to be heard, resulting in another release for both the band and Solid State Records.

== Track listing ==
All lyrics are written by Matthew Hasting; all music is composed by MyChildren MyBride.

| No. | Title | Length |
|---|---|---|
| 1. | "Terra Firma" | 4:18 |
| 2. | "Hooligans" | 2:36 |
| 3. | "King of the Hopeless" | 3:33 |
| 4. | "Crimson Grim" | 4:09 |
| 5. | "Lost Boys" | 3:09 |
| 6. | "Dark Passenger" | 2:50 |
| 7. | "Gatekeeper" (Instrumental) | 0:55 |
| 8. | "Digital Rebirth" | 3:38 |
| 9. | "Redeemer" | 2:51 |
| 10. | "Nuclear+" | 3:38 |
| 11. | "Lungs Full of Water" | 9:06 |
| Total length: | | 40:43 |

== Credits ==
MyChildren MyBride

- Matthew Hasting – vocals
- Daniel Alvarado – lead guitar, backing vocals
- Robert Bloomfield – rhythm guitar, backing vocals
- Joe Lengson – bass guitar, backing vocals

Session musicians

- Patrick Snyder – drums

Production

- Produced and engineered by Matt Goldman, at Glow in the Dark Studios, Atlanta, Georgia
- Mixed by Jason Suecof
- Mastered by Troy Glessner, at Spectre Studios, Renton, Washington
- A&R by Brandon Day
- Artwork by Jordan Butcher
- Photography by Jerad Knudson
