= Sovereign Strength =

American Christian hardcore band

- Also known as: SS
- Origin: Antelope Valley, California, U.S.
- Genres: Hardcore punk, Christian hardcore,Christian metal, metalcore
- Years active: 2005-2012, 2015, 2026
- Label: Unsigned

Sovereign Strength is an American Christian Metalcore band from Antelope Valley, California. The band has played with Saving Grace as well as many other bands, such as Norma Jean, Texas In July, The Chariot, Sleeping Giant, and War of Ages, on the Scream the Prayer Tour. In 2015, the band briefly reunited to play a show for Daniel Colato, a friend of the band's who was killed by a drunk driver.

== Members ==
Current

- Nelson Flores - Guitar (Mychildren Mybride)
- Jordan King - Vocals
- Jesse Gutierrez - Lead Guitar
- Derek Bjurman - Drums
- Korey Keeton - Bass

== Discography ==
EPs

- Recognition (2006)
- Life Is Easy When Your Eyes Are Closed (2008)

Studio album

- Reflections (2010; Mediaskare)
- The Prophecy (2011; Mediaskare)
