= Weights & Measures (Hyland album) =

Studio album by Hyland
- Released: May 3, 2011
- Recorded: 2009–2010
- Genre: Pop rock, Christian rock
- Length: 42:35
- Label: Tooth & Nail
- Producer: Aaron Sprinkle

Hyland chronology
Quotients EP (2009)	Weights & Measures (2011)	Finding Our Way (2012)

Professional ratings
Review scores
Source	Rating
AbsolutePunk	8/10 stars
Indie Vision Music	5/10 stars
Jesus Freak Hideout	3/5 stars
New Release Tuesday	4/5 stars
Sputnikmusic	3/5 stars

Weights & Measures is the debut album by the American pop rock band, Hyland. Weights & Measures is the first album released on Hyland's new label, Tooth & Nail Records. It was released on May 3, 2011. "This Love Is Free" peaked at No. 29 on the Christian Songs chart published by Billboard.

== Name meaning ==
Lead vocalist Jon Lewis explains:

The album coming out in May is called Weights & Measures and it's just talking about [how] as a society, we're always looking at peer pressure, seeing if we measure up to everybody else. We're always comparing ourselves and weighing ourselves against everybody. So, this album is really just talking about that struggle and that fight.

== Track listing ==
No.	Title	Writer(s)	Length
1.	"Jumping the Gun"	Hyland, Ben Kasica	3:27
2.	"The One that Got Away" (featuring Stephen Christian of Anberlin)	Hyland, Stephen Christian	3:03
3.	"Taking the Scenic Route"	Hyland, Kasica	3:23
4.	"Crying Out"	Hyland, Scott Keypayne, Aaron Sprinkle	3:28
5.	"This Love Is Free"	Hyland, Kasica	3:55
6.	"Fireworks"	Hyland	3:37
7.	"Coast to Coast"	Hyland, Kasica	4:18
8.	"Heart to Life"	Hyland	3:16
9.	"Til Death"	Hyland, Kasica	3:26
10.	"Downhill"	Hyland	3:12
11.	"Desperate Man"	Hyland	3:42
12.	"Never"	Hyland	3:48
Total length:			42:34

== Music videos ==
- "The One that Got Away" (no appearance by Stephen Christian)
- "This Love Is Free"

== Personnel ==
- Jon Lewis - lead vocals, rhythm guitar
- Mitch Hansen - lead guitar
- Ben Early - keys, backing vocals, additional guitar
- Jaran Sorenson - bass
- Steve Weigel - drums
- Ben Kasica - guitar solo ("Til Death")
