= Here I Come Falling =

American post-hardcore band

- Also known as: HICF
- Origin: Springfield, Missouri
- Genres: Christian hardcore, metalcore, post-hardcore, screamo
- Years active: 2005–2008, 2011
- Label: Rise
- Past members: Anthony Rivera; Daniel Alvarado; Parker Daniels; Isaac Neale; Brian Pappalardo; Austin Howell; Colby Moore; Jeff Choate; Rick Griffith; Kasey Smith; Chip Mezo; Princeton Patterson; Joe Hull; Dezmond Scotton; Chad Shumate; Nick Myers
- Website: HICF on Myspace

Here I Come Falling was an American post-hardcore band from Springfield, Missouri, formed in 2005. They were signed to Rise Records in 2007. They released one album, Oh Grave, Where Is Thy Victory, on January 8, 2008. The album charted at number 46 on the Top Billboard Christian Albums. They broke up in August 2008. They stated lineup changes and "other troubles" as the reason for the breakup.

== Musical style ==
Alternative Press Magazine said that the band "boasts a sonically manic sensibility." AllMusic said: "Their guitar leads may be plugged straight into the Devil's amplifier, yet their feet are planted on the path to Christ the Savior. No wonder their debut album, Oh Grave, Where Is thy Victory, boasts such Byzantine poetry for lyrics -- the meaning is suspect and subject to endless speculation and interpretation, just like most Sunday morning sermons." The band's influences include Underoath and The Chariot.

== Discography ==
Studio albums

- Oh Grave, Where Is Thy Victory (Rise Records, 2008)

== Band members ==
Final line-up

- Antony Rivera - lead vocals (The Overseer, ex-The Ghost Inside)
- Daniel Alvarado - guitars (ex-Mychildren Mybride)
- Parker Daniels - guitars [Recorded the album Oh Grave, Where Is Thy Victory]
- Brian Papalardo - bass guitar
- Isaac Neale - keyboards, synthesizers, programming
- Austin Howell - drums

Former members

- Colby Moore - lead vocals [Recorded the album Oh Grave, Where Is Thy Victory]
- Jeff Choate - clean vocals, keyboards, synthesizers, programming [Recorded the album Oh Grave, Where Is Thy Victory]
- Rick Griffith - bass guitar (ex-Agraceful) [Recorded the album Oh Grave, Where Is Thy Victory]
- Kasey Smith - guitar (ex-Agraceful) [Recorded the album Oh Grave, Where Is Thy Victory]
- Chip Mezo - keyboards, synthesizers, programming
- Princeton Patterson - drums [Recorded the album Oh Grave, Where Is Thy Victory]
- Joe Hull - drums
- Andy Foell - bass guitar
- Dezmond Scotton - drums
- Nik Myers - bass guitar
