= Club 3 Degrees =

- Club 3 Degrees logo
- Formation: 1989
- Type: Nightclub
- Legal status: 501(c)3 nonprofit
- Purpose: Christian music, evangelism
- Headquarters: (United States) Minneapolis, Minnesota, USA
- Region served: United States
- Director: Rick Narvaez

Club 3 Degrees, sometimes shortened to Club 3, was a Christian nightclub located in the warehouse district of Minneapolis, Minnesota in the late 1990s/ early 2000s. It is believed to have been the largest Christian nightclub in the United States at that time. Club 3 Degrees was a branch of 3 Degrees Ministries.

In 2010, the ministry changed into a more typical church schedule; the club’s last concert was in November 2010 and featured TobyMac and Skillet.

== History ==
The club's parent company, "3 Degrees Ministries", was founded in 1989 under the name "The New Union." Club 3 Degrees formed at the same time. The club stayed at its second location, after moving from the Old Union Bar and Grille, until 2003. At that point, the ministry, along with Club 3 and 3 Degrees Church, moved to the warehouse district of Minneapolis where it remained for 8 years. The move to the warehouse district attracted attention from major magazines such as Newsweek.

In 2011, 3 Degrees moved across the street from its long-time location and became a mobile ministry.

== Concerts and shows ==
Club 3 Degrees has hosted prominent artists in the Christian music industry, such as Project 86, Family Force 5, Children 18:3, TobyMac, Kirk Franklin, Aiming For Aurora, Philmont, Brian "Head" Welch, Lecrae, and others.

== Music tournament ==
Club 3 Degrees is best known for its nationally recognized music tournament, which has been judged by notable members of the music industry, such as the vice president of Tooth & Nail Records. The tournament is held in rounds and winners in past years, such as Hyland and Philmont, have gone professional, signing record deals with Tooth & Nail Records and ForeFront Records, respectively.
