= Foreverlin =

- Origin: Cheyenne, Wyoming; Laramie, Wyoming
- Genres: Christian alternative rock, indie rock
- Years active: 2012–2017
- Labels: Red Cord, Pando
- Members: Peter Blomberg; Caleb Blomberg; Nathan Thiessen; Burke Florom
- Past members: Anthony Riedl
- Website: foreverlin.com

Foreverlin was an American Christian alternative indie rock band, from the cities of Cheyenne and Laramie, Wyoming, where the band started making music in 2012. They released an extended play, Per Sempre in 2012, followed by two studio albums, Long Lost in 2013, with Red Cord Records, and, Still After in 2014, from Pando Records. In 2017, Foreverlin released their final EP entitled You Remain, which features covers of worship songs, the Doxology, and an original worship song (title track).

== Background ==
Foreverlin formed in 2012. Their members were lead vocalist and guitarist, Peter Blomberg, guitarist and background vocalist, Caleb Blomberg, bassist and background vocalist, Nathan Theissen, and drummer and background vocalist, Burke Florom.

== Music history ==
The band started as a musical entity in early 2012, with their first release, Per Sempre, an extended play, that was released on March 6, 2012, independently. Their subsequent release, a studio album, Long Lost, was released on April 30, 2013, from Red Cord Records. The single, "Long Lost", charted on the Billboard magazine Christian Rock chart at No. 27. They released, Still After, a studio album, with Pando Records, on May 19, 2015. This release saw, "Broken Lines", chart at No. 13 on the Billboard magazine Christian Rock chart. as well as, Speak, which charted at No. 15.

== Members ==
Members

- Peter Donald Blomberg – lead vocals, lead guitar
- Caleb Donald Blomberg – guitar, background vocals
- Nathan Thiessen – bass, background vocals
- Burke Wayne Florom – drums, background vocals

Former members

- Anthony Riedl

== Discography ==
Studio albums

- Long Lost (April 30, 2013, Red Cord)
- Still After (May 19, 2015, Pando)

EPs

- Per Sempre (March 6, 2012, independent)
- You Remain (January 20, 2017, independent)

Singles

Year	Single	Chart Positions
Year	Single	US Chr Rock
2013	"Long Lost"	16
2015	"Broken Lines"	11
2016	"Speak"	13
2017	"You Remain"	29
