= The Great Commission (band) =

American Christian hardcore band

- Origin: Riverside, California, U.S.
- Genres: Christian hardcore, metalcore, deathcore
- Years active: 2007–present
- Labels: Strike First, Ain't No Grave
- Members: Justin Singh; Angela Razo; Christian Ryan; Robby Joyner
- Past members: D.J. Burr; Solomon Joy; Zachary Cohen; Victor Cota; Billy Sweet; Alonso Azofeifa; Rodney; Nelson Flores; Solomon; Derek
- Website: facebook.com/TheGreatCommish

The Great Commission is an American Christian hardcore band from Riverside, California. The band started making music in 2007. Their original membership included Justin Singh, Angela Razo, D.J. Burr, Derek C, Matt B, & Chris Ryan with members Christian, Nelson, Rodney and Solomon joining in as members left. The band released an independently made extended play, The Great Commission, in 2008. They signed to Strike First Records, where they released, And Every Knee Shall Bow, a studio album, in 2009. Their subsequent studio album, Heavy Worship, was released by Ain't No Grave Records, in 2011. Firework, an extended play, was released by Ain't No Grave Recordings, in 2012 and lastly in 2013, the group self-released their follow up full length Cast the First Stone.

== History ==
The band commenced as a musical entity in 2007, with their first release, The Great Commission, an extended play, that was released independently in 2008, They signed to Strike First Records, where they released a studio album, And Every Knee Shall Bow, on February 17, 2009. Their subsequent studio album released by Ain't No Grave Records, Heavy Worship, on July 12, 2011. They released, an extended play, Firework, with Ain't No Grave Records, on May 8, 2012.

== Cameo ==
The band appears as a cameo in Taylor Swift's music video for the song "I Knew You Were Trouble".

== Members ==
Current members

- Justin Singh – vocals (2007–present)
- Angela Razo Singh – rhythm guitar, vocals (2007–present)
- Christian Ryan – rhythm guitar
- Robby Joyner – lead guitar

Former members

- D.J. Burr – lead guitar (2007–2009)
- Solomon Joy – guitar, drums
- Zachary Cohen – drums (2012–2013)
- Victor Cota – guitar, vocals
- Billy Sweet – guitar
- Alonso Azofeifa – drums
- Rodney – drums
- Derek – bass
- Nelson Flores – lead guitar (2009–2011) (ex-Sovereign Strength, MyChildren MyBride)
- Josh Loza – bass
- Corey White – guitar
- Steven "Sven" Webb – drums

== Discography ==
Studio albums

- And Every Knee Shall Bow (February 17, 2009, Strike First)
- Heavy Worship (July 12, 2011, Ain't No Grave)
- Cast the First Stone (September 9, 2013, Self-released)

EPs

- Firework (May 8, 2012, Ain't No Grave)
