= Localization =

Localization or localisation may refer to:

== Biology ==
- Localization of function, locating psychological functions in the brain or nervous system; see Linguistic intelligence
- Localization of sensation, ability to tell what part of the body is affected by touch or other sensation; see Allochiria
- Neurologic localization, in neurology, the process of deducing the location of injury based on symptoms and neurological examination
- Nuclear localization signal, an amino acid sequence on the surface of a protein which acts like a 'tag' to localize the protein in the cell
- Sound localization, a listener's ability to identify the location or origin of a detected sound
- Subcellular localization, organization of cellular components into different regions of a cell

== Engineering and technology ==
- GSM localization, determining the location of an active cell phone or wireless transceiver
- Robot localization, figuring out robot's position in an environment
- Indoor positioning system, a network of devices used to locate objects or people inside a building
- Navigation, determining one's position accurately on the surface of Earth
- Radiolocation, finding the location of something via radio waves
- Satellite navigation, a positioning and navigation technique aided by satellites

== Adaptation to language, etc. ==
- Language localisation, the process of adapting a product into different languages and adapting that translation to a country, region and/or jurisdiction
- Internationalization and localization, the adaptation of computer software for non-native environments, especially other nations and cultures
- Video game localization, preparation of video games for other locales
- Dub localization, the adaptation of a movie or television series for another audience
  - Subtitle localization
- Indigenization, the process of adopting and integrating elements of a local culture, including language, customs, and names, often to better align with the local community

== Mathematics ==
- Localization of a category, adding to a category inverse morphisms for some collection of morphisms, constraining them to become isomorphisms
- Localization of a ring and a module, in abstract algebra, a formal way to introduce the "denominators" to a given ring or a module
- Localization of a topological space, the localization of topological spaces at primes
- Localization theorem, theorem to infer the nullity of a function given only information about its continuity and the value of its integral

== Physics ==
- Anderson localization, in condensed matter physics, the absence of diffusion of waves in a disordered medium
- Weak localization, a physical effect which occurs in disordered electronic systems at very low temperatures
- Supersymmetric localization, a method to compute exact correlation functions of certain supersymmetric operators in supersymmetric quantum field theories

== Other uses ==
- Localization Era (1900-1300 BCE), the fourth and final period of the Indus Valley Tradition
- The opposite of economic globalisation
- Internationalization and localization, the adaptation of products for international use by conforming them to the conventions of each target locale, including language and culture.

== See also ==
- Local theory, a physical theory that obeys the principle of locality
- Local (disambiguation)
- Local group (disambiguation)
- Localism (disambiguation)
- Locality (disambiguation)
- Locus (disambiguation)
- Type locality (disambiguation)
- Locale (computer software)
