= Adam Nagaitis =

British actor (born 1985)

- Nagaitis in 2026
- Born: Adam Matthew Nagaitis; 7 June 1985 (age 41); Chorley, Lancashire, England
- Education: Stella Adler Studio of Acting; Royal Academy of Dramatic Art
- Occupation: Actor
- Years active: 2000–present

Adam Matthew Nagaitis (/nəˈɡaɪtɪs/; born 7 June 1985) is a British actor best known for his roles as Caulker's Mate Cornelius Hickey in the AMC television series The Terror and firefighter Vasily Ignatenko in the HBO miniseries Chernobyl. Nagaitis is a graduate of the Stella Adler Conservatory and the Royal Academy of Dramatic Art.

== Early life ==
Adam Nagaitis was born in 1985 in Chorley, Lancashire to Barry Nagaitis, a quantity surveyor and chartered engineer, and Susan (née Doran), who subsequently divorced. He has an older sister, Kate. In 2002, his father died after being struck by a bus while shopping in Manchester.

At age 19 he left the UK to study acting at the Stella Adler Conservatory in New York, from which he graduated in 2007. Following this, he studied at the Royal Academy of Dramatic Art in London. He graduated from RADA with a BA in Acting in 2012.

== Career ==
At the age of 14, he began his acting career in 2000 when he played a minor character in the television series Children's Ward.

In 2014, he appeared as Jimmy in Yann Demange's first feature film '71. He also appeared as Pete in The Inbetweeners 2 (2014).

In 2015, he appeared as Mr. Cummins in the period biographical film Suffragette and as Private Buckley in 7 episodes of the television series Banished.

In 2018, he appeared as Conductor Jimmy in the mystery action film The Commuter, featuring Liam Neeson, Vera Farmiga, Patrick Wilson and Sam Neill.

He starred as Caulker's Mate Cornelius Hickey in the 2018 AMC television series The Terror. He appeared as firefighter Vasily Ignatenko in the 2019 HBO miniseries Chernobyl.

In 2022, it was reported that Nagaitis had joined the cast of The Walking Dead: Daryl Dixon, a spinoff of The Walking Dead where he starred as Quinn.

== Acting credits ==
Key
†	Denotes projects that have not yet been released

=== Film ===
Year	Title	Role	Notes
2008	The Local	Jack Lord	
2012	Inside	Pete	Short film
2014	'71	Jimmy	
2014	Snow in Paradise	Gravesy	
2014	The Inbetweeners 2	Pete	
2014	Peterman	Dave	Also known as In the Blood
2015	Suffragette	Mr. Cummins	
2017	The Man with the Iron Heart	Karel Čurda	
2018	The Commuter	Conductor Jimmy	
2021	Gunpowder Milkshake	Virgil	
2021	The Last Duel	Adam Louvel	
2024	American Star	Ryan	
2024	Upholstergeist	Brother	Short film

=== Television ===
Year	Title	Role	Notes
2000	Children's Ward	Delboy	Episode: "Episode 9"
2004	The Courtroom	Kevin Hoad	Episode: "Dicky Heart"
2004	Outlaws	Dean Small	Episode: "A Dying Breed"
2013	Law & Order: UK	William Braxton	2 episodes
2014	Happy Valley	Brett McKendrick	3 episodes
2015	Banished	Private Buckley	Television miniseries
2015	Code of a Killer	Ian Whenby	Episode: "Episode 2"
2015	You, Me and the Apocalypse	Todd Jr.	Episode: "Right in the Nuts"
2016	Houdini & Doyle	Sergeant George Gudgett	4 episodes
2016	To Walk Invisible	Branwell Brontë	Television film
2018	The Terror	Cornelius Hickey	Television miniseries
2019	Chernobyl	Vasily Ignatenko	Television miniseries
2019	A Christmas Carol	Fred	Episode: "The Human Beast"
2022	Red Rose	Rick Bennett	8 episodes
2023	The Gold	Micky McAvoy	4 episodes
2023	The Walking Dead: Daryl Dixon	Quinn	6 episodes
2024	The Responder	Franny	5 episodes
2024–2025	The Agency	Grandma	8 episodes
2025	A Thousand Blows	Earl of Lonsdale	3 episodes
2026	Star City	Valya Mironov	7 episodes
TBA	Task	Luke Clemmons	Filming

=== Radio ===
Year	Title	Role	Notes
2012	Une Vie	Julien	BBC Radio 4
2012	The Loving Ballad of Captain Bateman	Derek / Coach Driver	BBC Radio 4
2012	55 and Over	Sam	BBC Radio 4
2012	The Christmas Diaries	Joseph	BBC Radio 4 Extra
2017	The Archivist	Ben	BBC Radio 4
