= Localism =

Localism may refer to:

- Fiscal localism, ideology of keeping money in a local economy
- Local purchasing, a movement to buy local products and services
- Conflict in surf culture, between local residents and visitors for access to beaches with large waves
- The linguistic theory that all grammatical cases, including syntactic cases, are based on a local meaning
- Localism (politics)
  - Localism in Hong Kong, a newly emerging political movement in Hong Kong, which strives for the autonomy of Hong Kong
    - Localist camp, related political camp
  - Taiwanization, Localism in Taiwan, Taiwanese localization movement
    - Pan-Green Coalition, related political groups
  - New localism, a concept associated with Tony Blair's Labour government in the United Kingdom

== See also ==
- Local (disambiguation)
- Local food
- Localization (disambiguation)
