= Vox Lumiere =

American theatre production company

- Industry: performing arts
- Genre: rock, pop, alternative, opera
- Headquarters: Los Angeles, CA, USA
- Website: http://www.VoxLumiere.com

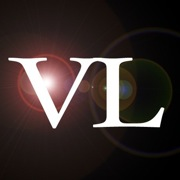
Vox Lumiere logo

Vox Lumiere is a Los Angeles–based theater/concert production and company. Vox Lumiere's shows combine the playing of a silent film with the live performance of original songs, dance and music. Vox Lumiere has combined live performance with the following silent films: Metropolis, The Hunchback of Notre Dame, Peter Pan and The Phantom of the Opera.

== History ==
Vox Lumiere (“voices of light” in Latin and French) was founded in 2000 by composer Kevin Saunders Hayes. On April 30, 2000, Vox Lumiere debuted the music for its first production, "Vox Lumiere – Metropolis" at the sixth annual Avignon Film Festival in New York City. In September 2005, Vox Lumiere’s second full-length production, "Vox Lumiere – The Hunchback of Notre Dame" opened the Prince Music Theater 2005–2006 season in Philadelphia. From 2005 to 2008, Vox Lumiere toured extensively throughout the United States and Canada with "Vox Lumiere–The Hunchback of Notre Dame."

Vox Lumiere has performed in theaters and opera houses throughout North America and Europe, including the Cinémathèque Française in Paris, the Avignon Opera House in Avignon, France, and the Hollywood and Highland Center in Los Angeles.

In fall 2008, Vox Lumiere’s production of "Vox Lumiere – The Hunchback of Notre Dame" was filmed at the La Mirada Theater in La Mirada, California, to be distributed and broadcast nationally on PBS. CD and DVD recordings of the special were produced by Detroit Public TV and released in October 2008 by Koch/E1 Entertainment.

Vox Lumiere productions have featured performers from Broadway, film and television. Performers have included Melissa Fahn, Christian Nesmith, Victoria Levy and Suzi Carr George among others. Vox Lumiere and its tagline "silents you can hear" are registered United States trademarks.

== Productions ==
"Vox Lumiere – Metropolis" premiered in 2000 at the sixth annual Avignon Film Festival in New York. This production is performed in conjunction with the 1927 silent film Metropolis, a science fiction classic directed by Fritz Lang.

"Vox Lumiere – The Hunchback of Notre Dame" premiered in 2005 at the Prince Music Theater as part of the Philadelphia Fringe Festival. This production is performed in conjunction with the 1923 silent film The Hunchback of Notre Dame starring Lon Chaney, Sr.

"Vox Lumiere – Phantom of the Opera" is performed in conjunction with the 1925 silent film The Phantom of the Opera, adapted from the novel by Gaston Leroux and starring Lon Chaney, Sr.

"Vox Lumiere – Peter Pan" is performed in conjunction with the 1924 Paramount Pictures silent film Peter Pan.

"Vox Lumiere – Intolerance" is performed in conjunction with the 1916 Triangle Film Corporation silent film Intolerance.

== Discography ==
Studio Albums

- Vox Lumiere – The Phantom of the Opera (2010)
- Vox Lumiere – Metropolis – Special Limited Edition (2007)
- Vox Lumiere – The Hunchback of Notre Dame – Special Limited Edition (2003)
- Vox Lumiere – Highlights from Five Vox Lumiere Productions (2007)
- Vox Lumiere – Metropolis – Avignon Film Festival Special Limited Edition (2000)

Live Albums

- Vox Lumiere – The Hunchback of Notre Dame (2008)

== Filmography ==
- Vox Lumiere – The Hunchback of Notre Dame (2008)

== Appearances and other work ==
Movies

Vox Lumiere was featured on the soundtrack to the 2010 feature film Expecting Mary and the 2006 feature film Mr. Fix It.
