= Type locality =

Type locality may refer to:

- Type locality (biology)
- Type locality (geology)
- Type site (in archaeology)

== See also ==
- Local (disambiguation)
- Locality (disambiguation)
