= Local =

Local may refer to:

== Geography and transportation ==
- Local (train), a train serving local traffic demand
- Local, Missouri, a community in the United States

== Arts, entertainment, and media ==
- Local (comics), a limited series comic book by Brian Wood and Ryan Kelly
- Local (novel), a 2001 novel by Jaideep Varma
- The Local (film), a 2008 action-drama film
- The Local, English-language news websites in several European countries

== Computing ==
- .local, a network address component

== Mathematics ==
- Local property, a property which occurs on sufficiently small or arbitrarily small neighborhoods of points
- Local ring, type of ring in commutative algebra

== Other uses ==
- Pub, a drinking establishment, known as a "local" to its regulars

== See also ==
- Local food
- Local group (disambiguation)
- Locale (disambiguation)
- Localism (disambiguation)
- Locality (disambiguation)
- Localization (disambiguation)
- Locus (disambiguation)
- Lokal (disambiguation)
