= Prayer to a Vengeful God =

- Directed by: Dan Eberle
- Written by: Dan Eberle
- Starring: Dan Eberle; Paul James Vasquez; Jennifer Farrugia
- Production company: Insurgent Pictures
- Release date: October 8, 2010
- Running time: 93 minutes
- Country: United States
- Language: English

Prayer to a Vengeful God is a 2010 dramatic crime film, written, directed by, and starring Dan Eberle. Broken into several chapters, the film follows the attempts of a man awakening from a coma to seek revenge on his wife's murderers. The film features absolutely no dialogue except one exchange of the word "hi".

== Plot ==
John Krause awakens from an extended coma with visions of his wife Jennifer. A flashback depicts Jennifer as a talented artist, working on a self-portrait. The doorbell rings at their apartment and, upon answering the door, John is pushed to the floor and shot by an unknown assailant. Later as he recovers, John is visited by a police detective who says that Jennifer was strangled to death in the assault. John attempts to return his life of work and visiting Jennifer's grave, but the grief overwhelms him and he attempts suicide. He passes out and fails to die when he vomits up the pills.

A still bleeding John staggers through the local park. He is followed by a mysterious young woman (the Urchin), who assists him in buying narcotics from a street dealer. During this process, John witnesses a Transient being hassled by thugs; the Transient is defeats them with an unknown martial art. Intrigued, John approaches him and shares a pipe of marijuana with him, during which the Transient sees John's bleeding wrist and reveals a similar scar on his own forearm. Finding new peace in his meeting, John returns home to dispose of his pain pills, but encounters a redhead named Gabby, a friend of Jennifer. An extended flashback shows events that transpired shortly before the attack.

Back at the club, John approaches the Miscreant with his cash, and follows her just as Jennifer did, to the bathroom and to the apartment, where this time he is welcomed in. John and the Miscreant have sex and do more drugs, and she lays in a stupor on John. He throws her to the floor and gets dressed when he hears multiple footsteps approaching, but she rouses enough to see him grab the machete and attacks him. John strangles her to death even as she stabs him with a heroin spoon, then kills the Bouncer with a rear naked choke hold.

As the sun rises, John sits on the roof with the gun in his hand. One final flashback shows how he and Jennifer first met, on a rainy day in the park, simply exchanging the word "hi" (the only dialogue in the entire film). As he views a vision of his former self, John places the gun in his mouth and squeezes the trigger, but the chamber is empty. He walks towards the light as the vision of himself smiles and walks away.

== Cast ==
- Dan Eberle as John Krause
- Jennifer Farrugia as Jennifer Krause
- Paul James Vasquez as Transient
- Amanda Bender as Miscreant
- Beau Alluli as Bearer
- Leah Rudick as Gabby
- Jillaine Gill as Urchin
- James Coolio
