= Lokal =

Lokal may refer to:

- Kanal Lokal, defunct Swedish television channel
- Berliner Lokal-Anzeiger, German newspaper
- Lokal (Swiss brand), a brand of food from Manor (department store)

== See also ==
- Local (disambiguation)
