= Avignon Film Festival =

Film festival

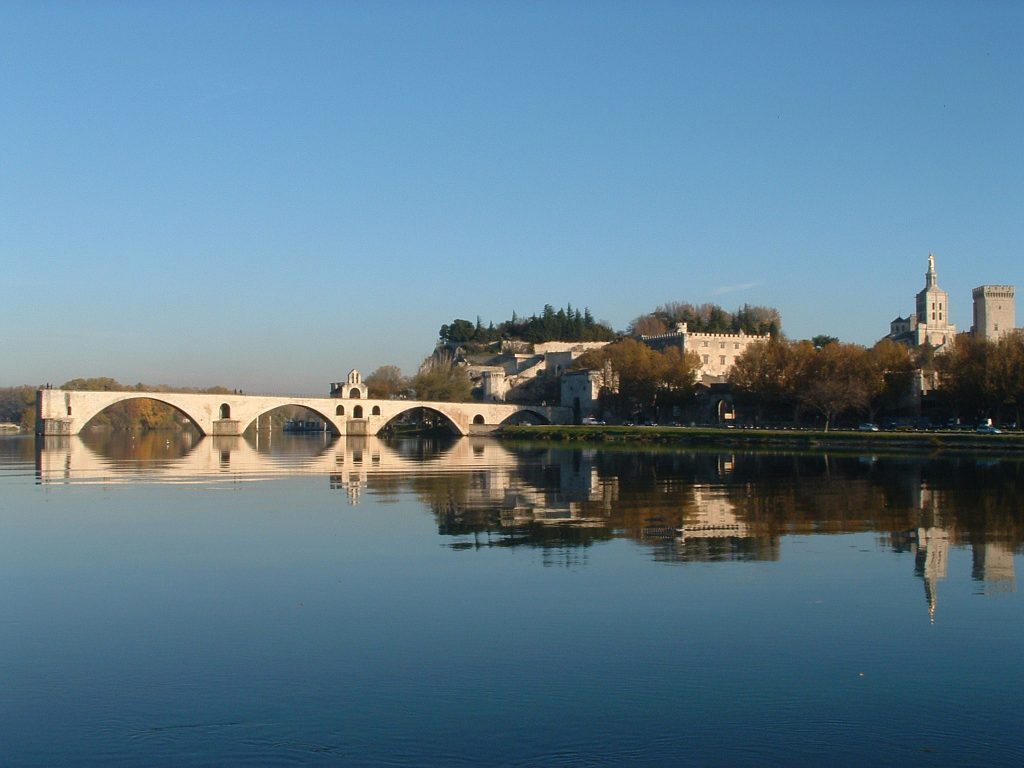
Avignon

The Avignon Film Festival (created 1984), also known as the Avignon/New York Film Festival or Rencontres Cinématographiques Franco-Américain d'Avignon, took place every year in Avignon, France along with a twin film festival organised in New York. It was last held in 2008.

== History ==
Avignon Film Festival was created to promote French/American independent cinema through previews, retrospectives and round-tables.

An award ceremony encouraged young film directors to participate in the festival. The purpose was to bring together independent filmmakers from the United States, France and other European countries. Their mission was to encourage deeper understanding and appreciation for contemporary, thought-provoking cinema by showcasing the work of innovative filmmakers. Feature films, short films and documentaries were presented in French, English and other European languages. Every French film was subtitled in English, and European films in English or French. Film directors, producers and screenwriters could join the discussions about their work with the public.

In 1993 the Harvard Film Archive invited the organisation to co-produce the first American edition of Rencontres Cinématographiques franco-américaines d'Avignon. In 1994, the founder, Jérôme Henry Rudes, launched the Avignon/New York Film Festival at the Angelika Film Center in Manhattan. The festivals were held in June and November. The term "Avignon Film Festival" was born in 2000 due to the extension of the program to Europe.

== Awards ==
- Le Roger: awarded to the Best Feature film from France, the Best Feature film from the USA, the Best Short film from France and the Best Short film from the USA.
- Filming Award: awarded to the three best feature films (American, French and European).
- Panavision Award: for the three best short films
- Kodak Vision Award: for best filmmaking
- SACD Scénario Award: for the two best scriptwriters

== Le Roger Award Recipients ==
1996:

- Best Feature - France: Le fabuleux destin de Madame Petlet / Camille de Casabianca
- Best Feature - USA: Slings & Arrows / Geoffrey Sharp
- Best Short - France: En garde, monsieur / Didier Fontan
- Best Short - USA: Black Kites / Jo Andres

1997:

- Best Feature - France: Des nouvelles du bon Dieu / Didier Le Pêcheur
- Best Feature - USA: 'M' Word / Brett Parker
- Best Short - France: Double jeu / Emmanuel Oberg
- Best Short - USA: Around the Time / Phil Bertelsen

1998:

- Best Feature - France: Artemisia / Agnès Merlet
- Best Feature - USA: Once We Were Strangers / Emanuele Crialese
- Best Short - France: Théo, t'es là? / Julie Lipinski
- Best Short - USA: Tree Shade / Lisa Collins
- Separate Star Award: Pyeon ji / Pierre Anais
- Vision Award: Little Red Riding Hood / Scott Ramsey

1999:

- Best Feature - France: Le ciel, les oiseaux,... et ta mère! / Djamel Bensalah
- Best Feature - USA: Man of the Century / Adam Abraham
- Best Short - France: Personne avant toi / Olivier Lécot
- Best Short - USA: Making Change / Georgia Irwin Eisner
- Separate Star Award: Weekend Getaway / Elizabeth Holder
- Vision Award: The Money Shot / Elia Lyssy

2000:

- Best Feature - France: Salsa / Joyce Buñuel
- Best Feature - USA: Blue Moon / John A. Gallagher
- Best Short - France: Samedi, dimanche et aussi lundi / Eric Valette
- Best Short - USA: City of Thieves / Jason Brandenberg
- Separate Star Award: Générique / Xavier de Choudens
- Vision Award: The Citizen / Oliver Bokelberg
- Honorary Roger: Vox Lumiere – Metropolis / Kevin Saunders Hayes (For his new score)

2001:

- Best Feature - France: Origine contrôlée / Zakia Tahri & Ahmed Bouchaala
- Best Feature - USA: How to Kill Your Neighbor's Dog / Michael Kalesniko
- Best Short - France: Raconte / Guillaume Malandrin
- Best Short - USA: Here / Brendan Donovan
- Separate Star Award: Raconte / Guillaume Malandrin
- Vision Award: The Photographer / Vanja Cernjul
- Honorary Roger: Jacqueline Bisset (In recognition of her 30-year acting career both in France and America), Vox Lumiere – The Hunchback of Notre Dame: Kevin Saunders Hayes (For his new score)

2002:

- Best Feature - France: Grégoire Moulin contre l'humanité / Artus de Penguern
- Best Feature - USA: The Holy Land / Eitan Gorlin
- Best Short - France: Les petits oiseaux / Fred Louf
- Best Short - USA: Celebration / Daniel Stedman
- Vision Award: Pourquoi se marier le jour de la fin du monde? / Harry Cleven

2003:

- Best Feature - France: Les diables / Christophe Ruggia
- Best Feature - USA: Melvin Goes to Dinner / Bob Odenkirk
- Best Short - France: J'attendrai le suivant... / Philippe Orreindy
- Best Short - USA: Coyote Beach / Markus Griesshammer
- Vision Award: The Quality of Mercy / Stephen Marro
- "Valérie" Award: Sandra Schulberg
- Special Roger: Wings / Sasha Gordon (For artistic accomplishment - original score)

2004:

- Best Feature - France: Comme si de rien n'était / Pierre-Olivier Mornas
- Best Feature - USA: David Hockney: The Colors of Music / Maryte Kavaliauskas & Seth Schneidman
- Best Short - France: Soyons attentifs... / Thierry Sebban
- Best Short - USA: The Reunion / Ben Epstein

2005:

- Best Feature - France: Ze film / Guy Jacques
- Best Feature - USA: Lbs. / Matthew Bonifacio
- Best Short - France: Handicap / Lewis Martin Soucy
- Best Short - USA: The Method / Jason Holzman

2006:

- Best Feature - Europe: Pour l'amour de Dieu / Ahmed Bouchaala & Zakia Tahri
- Best Feature - USA: JailCity / Dan Eberle
- Best Short - Europe: Intimità / Matteo Minetto
- Best Short - USA: Hot Afternoons Have Been in Montana / Ken Kimmelman
- Pierre Salinger Award for Documentary Filmmaking: Blues by the Beach / Joshua Faudem
- Chateuneuf-du-Pape Cinema Award: John Turturro

2007:

- Best Feature - Europe: Komma / Martine Doyen
- Best Feature - USA: Superheroes / Alan Brown
- Best Short - Europe: Il était une fois... Sasha et Désiré / Cécile Vernant
- Best Short - USA: To Paint the Portrait of a Bird / Seamus McNally
