= Locality =

Locality may refer to:

- Locality, a historical named location or place in Canada
- Locality (association), an association of community regeneration organizations in England
- Locality (linguistics)
- Locality (settlement)
- Locality (Switzerland)
- Locality (Australia), a geographic subdivision in Australia

== Science ==
- Locality (astronomy)
- Locality of reference, in computer science
- Locality (statistics)
- Principle of locality, in physics

== See also ==
- Local (disambiguation)
- Type locality (disambiguation)
