= Local group (disambiguation) =

Local group or localgroup may refer to:

- Local Group, a galaxy group
- localgroup, a sub-command of the net command
- Locally compact group, a mathematics concept
- Group Policy, feature in the Microsoft Windows operating system
- Local Media Group, news media company

== See also ==
- Local (disambiguation)
