= Dan Eberle =

American actor

Dan Eberle (born September 20, 1974 in San Diego, California) is an American film actor, writer, producer and director.

== Early life and education ==
Eberle attended University of North Texas with a scholarship in jazz performance and then worked as a performer and teacher. In 2005, Eberle began writing, acting and directing.

== Career ==
Eberle co-owns production company Insurgent Pictures, which he co-founded in New York City in 2006.

In 2006, Eberle wrote, directed and acted in the feature film JailCity which won Best Feature (US) at the 12th annual Avignon Film Festival.

In 2008, Eberle wrote, directed and acted in the feature film The Local which was featured in the Brooklyn Film Festival.

In 2010, Eberle wrote, directed and acted in the feature film Prayer to a Vengeful God, which premiered at the 2010 Royal Flush Festival in New York, where it won the Audience Favorite Award and the Jury Award for Best Narrative Feature. Vanguard Cinema released the film on DVD July 26, 2011.

In 2013, Eberle wrote, directed and acted in the feature film Cut to Black. Cut to Black won the Audience Award in the 2013 Brooklyn Film Festival.

In 2016, Eberle wrote, directed and acted in the feature film Sole Proprietor.
