= New localism =

New localism was a political concept associated with Tony Blair's Labour government in the United Kingdom (1997–2010). It was intended to indicate a cautious devolution of power to the local level in an attempt to better implement national goals.

== Labour's first term approach ==
New localism arose from the experience of Labour's first term of office (1997–2001), during which the government's policy approach was characterised as being highly centralised and only partly effective. The most emblematic of its policies were the centrally-driven literacy and numeracy hours in schools.

Labour also introduced new and more complex forms of performance management in an attempt to drive up the standard of local public services through inspection and target setting. In Whitehall, this was achieved through public service agreements between departments and the Treasury, setting out what was expected of a particular department in return for its funding.

In the wider public sector, local government was required to undertake a heavy service review and inspection programme known as Best Value, while the NHS got a new Commission for Healthcare Inspection and a system of 'star rating' based league tables. However, these policies were rapidly seen to be too bureaucratic. Indeed, they could sometimes have adverse consequences as public service organisations changed their priorities to meet centrally set targets. One example of this is arguably the way the government's focus on education and social services drove councils to focus their spending and effort in these areas. While positive in itself, the result was that local environmental services were relatively less well resourced, despite the fact that they are key determinants of public satisfaction with local government. The result was that councils were seen to be improving rapidly by Whitehall, but not by the public, whose satisfaction with local government declined.

New localism emerged from an increasing understanding of the limitations of centrally-driven policy implementation. It involved an acceptance that local problems could not be solved by standardised approaches imposed from above, and that local agencies needed space to adapt and innovate within the policy framework.

== New localism and 'old localism' ==
New localism was characterised by a cautious devolution of power to the local level in an attempt to better implement national goals. It emphasised the devolution of managerial over political power - the aim was generally to allow local managers to meet national priorities more effectively, rather than to allow local politicians to deviate from national goals. New localism differed from the implicit 'old localism' in two important ways. First, it accepted the role of central government in driving change at the local level, something that the localists of the 1980s strongly resisted. Second, it did not center on the role of the local authority, but took a wider view of the locality that included communities and other public service organisations such as health and police services.

== In practice ==
New localism has been most strongly advocated by the New Local Government Network think tank. Advocates in the Labour government have included Alan Milburn, the former health secretary, and Hazel Blears. Nick Raynsford, the local government minister from 2001 to 2005, used his tenure to launch a process called Local:Vision, which aimed at creating a 10-year strategy for local government policy and took a distinctively new localist perspective. His successor, David Miliband, developed this approach further, suggesting the continuing development of a new localist agenda in Labour's third term (2005–2010).

Key new localist policies included:

- Foundation hospitals - the granting of more autonomy to NHS hospital trusts that scored the highest marks in their inspections, including freedom to borrow money on the markets and adjust staff pay levels. The foundation trusts had to create an elected board including representatives from the local community to oversee their work.
- Freedoms for local government - The government granted a number of new freedoms to councils, including the right to freely borrow capital on the financial markets and a general reduction in the number of plans that had to be submitted for central government approval. Further freedoms were promised to those councils that scored the top 'excellent' grade in the key Comprehensive Performance Assessment inspection process. These included freedom from council tax capping and a three-year holiday from inspection. The local government community complained that these freedoms were not always granted in practice.
- Neighbourhoods - The government showed a growing interest in creating new forms of more direct neighbourhood governance in the hope of improving the responsiveness of public services and engaging local people in both local democracy and the delivery of their own services through service level contracts and co-production.
- Education reform - it might also be argued that the government's policy of transferring power to school headteachers from local education authorities represented a new localist approach to devolving beyond the council to local communities.
