= Localization theorem =

In mathematics, particularly in integral calculus, the localization theorem allows, under certain conditions, to infer the nullity of a function given only information about its continuity and the value of its integral.

Let F(x) be a real-valued function defined on some open interval Ω of the real line that is continuous in Ω. Let D be an arbitrary subinterval contained in Ω. The theorem states the following implication: $\int_D F(x) \, \mathrm{d}x = 0 ~ \forall D \subset \Omega ~ \Rightarrow ~ F(x) = 0 ~ \forall x \in \Omega$

float

A simple proof is as follows: if there were a point x_{0} within Ω for which F(x_{0}) ≠ 0, then the continuity of F would require the existence of a neighborhood of x_{0} in which the value of F was nonzero, and in particular of the same sign than in x_{0}. Since such a neighborhood N, which can be taken to be arbitrarily small, must however be of a nonzero width on the real line, the integral of F over N would evaluate to a nonzero value. However, since x_{0} is part of the open set Ω, all neighborhoods of x_{0} smaller than the distance of x_{0} to the frontier of Ω are included within it, and so the integral of F over them must evaluate to zero. Having reached the contradiction that ∫_{N} F(x) dx must be both zero and nonzero, the initial hypothesis must be wrong, and thus there is no x_{0} in Ω for which F(x_{0}) ≠ 0.

The theorem is easily generalized to multivariate functions, replacing intervals with the more general concept of connected open sets, that is, domains, and the original function with some F(x) : R^{n} → R, with the constraints of continuity and nullity of its integral over any subdomain D ⊂ Ω. The proof is completely analogous to the single variable case, and concludes with the impossibility of finding a point x_{0} ∈ Ω such that F(x_{0}) ≠ 0.

== Example ==
An example of the use of this theorem in physics is the law of conservation of mass for fluids, which states that the mass of any fluid volume must not change: $\frac{\mathrm{d}}{\mathrm{d}t} \int_{V_f} \rho(\vec x, t) \, \mathrm{d}\Omega = 0$

Applying the Reynolds transport theorem, one can change the reference to an arbitrary (non-fluid) control volume V_{c}. Further assuming that the density function is continuous (i.e. that our fluid is monophasic and thermodynamically metastable) and that V_{c} is not moving relative to the chosen system of reference, the equation becomes: $\int_{V_c} \left [ {{\partial \rho} \over {\partial t}} + \nabla \cdot (\rho \vec v) \right ] \, \mathrm{d}\Omega = 0$

As the equation holds for any such control volume, the localization theorem applies, rendering the common partial differential equation for the conservation of mass in monophase fluids: ${\partial \rho \over \partial t} + \nabla \cdot (\rho \vec v) = 0$
