= The Jamboree (music festival) =

Annual music festival

The Jamboree (stylized as The JAMboree) is an annual music festival held in Toledo, Ohio. The concert was originally only one day, but it has since expanded to both Saturday and Sunday. The festival features mostly metalcore and hardcore bands and also various merchandise booths.

== Time Line ==
=== 2010 ===
- Main Stage:

The Devil Wears Prada, Whitechapel, We Came As Romans, Miss May I, The Color Morale, I Am Abomination, All 's Quest, At the Skylines, Vivian Banks, Halfway to Winter, Gale Tempest, Burn the Ships!, Wake from Existence, Death of an Era

- 2nd Stage:

Premonitions of War, For the Fallen Dreams, ABACABB, American Me, And Hell Followed With, Within the Ruins, Like Moths to Flames, Fall to the Queen, Fight the Tide, Lookoutbelow!, Lost in the Light, Once at War, Arson Our Savior, I Have Seen Fire, Versus the Ocean

- 3rd Stage:

Four Letter Lie, Abandon All Ships, Kid Liberty, Destruction of a Rose, Across the Sun, Slay the Betrayer, Hailsite

=== 2011 ===
- Main Stage:

Asking Alexandria, Emmure, Winds of Plague, Chiodos, Miss May I, Carnifex, Oceano, Evergreen Terrace, The Tony Danza Tapdance Extravaganza, Within the Ruins, The Crimson Armada, Lower Than Atlantis, Lookout Below!, Arson Our Savior

- Substream Magazine Stage:

The Wonder Years, Fireworks, Reign Supreme, Salt the Wound, Decoder, Lionheart, Such Gold, Hundredth, Legion, Like Moths to Flames, No Bragging Rights, Legacy, The Fragile Season

- Digital Tour Bus Stage:

Monsters, Smash Your Enemies, CDVR, The Greenery, Trust Me I'm a Doctor, FreQontrol, Seasons, Citizen, Cities & Years, Vivian Banks, Siren the Escape

=== 2012 ===
April 14, 2012

- Main Stage:

We Came As Romans, Emmure, Born of Osiris, Woe, Is Me, On Broken Wings, The Plot in You, The Color Morale, Obey the Brave, Glass Cloud, Reign Supreme, No Bragging Rights, Structures, Undesirable People

- Patio Stage:

For All I Am, Citizen, It Prevails, Counterparts, Harm's Way, Wilson, Smash Your Enemies, With Life in Mind, Dr. Acula, Ice Nine Kills, SycAmour

- Side Stage:

Convictions, Maker, State Champs, Johnny Booth, A Violent Perfection, Mayor Mayor, What Happened in Vegas

April 15, 2012

- Main Stage:

The Black Dahlia Murder, Whitechapel, The Acacia Strain, Oceano, And Hell Followed With, Texas in July, Lionheart, Like Moths to Flames, Hundredth, The Air I Breathe, Legion, Parables, In Alcatraz 1962

- Patio Stage:

Gideon, Fit for an Autopsy, Delusions, The Plot in You (special guest performance), Palisades, Aegaeon, As Hell Retreats, Legacy, React, Endeavors, Dweller

- Side Stage:

Measure the Redshift, Of Virtue, Dismember the Fallen, Shores of Elysium, Tharsis They, Hail to the King, Collector, Like Statues

=== 2013 ===
2013 was the first year to feature events other than the festival. A pre-party was held on Friday, April 12 at Frankies Inner City in Toledo, and featured performances from Fireworks, Louder Than Bombs, React, and The Fight Within. An after-party was also held at Frankies after Day 1 and featured a performance from Andrew W.K.

April 13, 2013

- Main stage:

Every Time I Die, The Story So Far, The Acacia Strain, Man Overboard, The Plot in You, Stray from the Path, Backtrack, Citizen, Tonight Alive, Undesirable People, Fit for a King, Mouth of the South, Endeavors

- Side stage:

Dead End Path, Death Before Dishonor, The Greenery, Hostage Calm, Born Low, Koji, Live It Out, The American Scene, To the Winds, InDirections, This Is a Lifetime

April 14, 2013

- Main Stage:

Hatebreed, Miss May I, Terror, Job for a Cowboy, After the Burial, Within the Ruins, I Declare War, The Contortionist, Glass Cloud, Legion, Erra, City in the Sea, Shore of Elysium

- Side Stage:

This Is Hell, Reflections, Sworn In, Aegaeon, King 810, The Holy Guile, Watch This Burn, King Conquer, Years Since the Storm, Arson Our Savior, Hail to the King
