= No Eternity in Gold =

Studio album by Like Moths to Flames
- Released: October 30, 2020
- Genre: Metalcore
- Length: 38:04
- Label: UNFD
- Producer: Carson Slovak; Grant McFarland

Like Moths to Flames chronology
Dark Divine (2017)	No Eternity in Gold (2020)	Pure Like Porcelain (2021)

Singles from No Eternity in Gold
- 1. "Habitual Decline" Released: August 11, 2020; 2. "YOTM" Released: September 9, 2020; 3. "Selective Sacrifice" Released: October 7, 2020; 4. "Killing What's Underneath" Released: October 27, 2020

No Eternity in Gold is the fifth studio album by American metalcore band Like Moths to Flames. It was released on October 30, 2020, through UNFD. The album was produced by Carson Slovak and Grant McFarland. It is the band's first studio release with the label. It is also their last album to feature original member and bassist Aaron Evans, who was fired from the band following allegations of sexual misconduct and mental abuse in 2023.

== Background and promotion ==
In May 2019, vocalist Chris Roetter confirmed that the band had parted ways with Rise Records, the label they had been with since their inception and through which they had released all of their albums and EPs up to that point. He also confirmed that they had already written and recorded several tracks towards what may be their fifth album.

On August 5, 2020, the band teased on their Twitter account that a single titled "Habitual Decline" would be released on August 11. On that day, the band officially released the single along with its music video. At the same time, the band officially announced the album itself, the album cover, the track list, and release date.

On September 9, the band released the second single "YOTM". On October 7, the band released the third single "Selective Sacrifice" alongside an accompanying music video. On October 27, three days before the album release, the band released the fourth and final single, "Killing What's Underneath".

== Critical reception ==
Professional ratings
Review scores
Source	Rating
Distorted Sound	7/10
KillYourStereo	80/100
Rock 'N' Load	9/10
Wall of Sound	9/10

The album received positive reviews from critics. Ellis Heasley of Distorted Sound scored the album 7 out of 10 and said: "Ultimately, how listeners will feel about No Eternity in Gold will likely come down to what they expect from metalcore. If you're a sucker for technical, crushing breakdowns and big sing-along choruses, then you'll definitely enjoy this. If you prefer things a little more unpredictable and unhinged, this album is unlikely to be the one for you. Either way, No Eternity in Gold is a record which reveals a band who are still among the best for what they do." Hunter Hewgley from KillYourStereo gave the album 80 out of 100 and said: "No Eternity in Gold is, without a doubt, the comeback album that I've been personally expecting from Like Moths To Flames. I'd even go as far as to say that it's the band's second best record overall, sitting just behind An Eye for an Eye. If you like your breakdowns heavy, your choruses huge, and your vocals powerful (screaming and singing alike), this is the metalcore album you should be listening to. Everything from the brute staccato chugs of 'Habitual Decline', to the heart-stopping, 808-filled madness that is the breakdown finale in 'Spiritual Eclipse' is fantastic, even if the album does have the occasional small stumble. Like Moths To Flames have positioned themselves back on the path of success and memorability, crafting a release that laughs in the faces of their many lacking core peers. There might be 'no eternity in gold', but there just might be an eternity in this kind of tightly-wound, well-rounded modern metalcore."

Rock 'N' Load praised the album saying, "Decades worth of grinding it on the road have lead Like Moths To Flames to a point in their career that such experience can be outpoured into eleven perfectly crafted tracks with such emotion and angst that it simply leaves you breathless and begging for more. No Eternity in Gold could be their finest work to date." Ricky Aarons from Wall of Sound gave the album almost a perfect score 9/10 and saying: "Again, I love the production here, and also how LMTF deliver their signature sound, but still manage to dial it up a few notches. I genuinely think that metalcore fans will be debating their number one metalcore album of the year between this one and the delivery by Currents a few months ago."

== Track listing ==
No Eternity in Gold track listing
No.	Title	Length
1.	"The Anatomy of Evil"	3:00
2.	"Habitual Decline"	3:11
3.	"Burn in Water, Drown in Flame"	2:54
4.	"Fluorescent White"	3:59
5.	"God Complex"	3:34
6.	"YOTM"	3:11
7.	"Killing What's Underneath"	3:14
8.	"A Servant of Plague"	3:28
9.	"Demon of My Own"	3:37
10.	"Selective Sacrifice"	3:42
11.	"Spiritual Eclipse"	4:09
Total length:		38:04

Vinyl bonus track
No.	Title	Length
12.	"Basilisk"	3:07
Total length:		41:05

B-sides
No.	Title	Length
1.	"Basilisk"	3:07
2.	"Inherit the Tragedy"	3:16
Total length:		6:22

== Personnel ==
Like Moths to Flames

- Chris Roetter – lead vocals
- Jeremy Smith – lead guitar
- Zach Pishney – rhythm guitar
- Aaron Evans – bass, backing vocals

Additional musicians

- Isaiah Perez of Phinehas – drums, percussion

Additional personnel

- Carson Slovak – production
- Grant McFarland – production
