= Bury It (disambiguation) =

"Bury It" is a 2016 song by Chvrches from Every Open Eye.

Bury It may also refer to:

- Bury It, a 2002 comedy short with Andy Beckwith, Des McAleer, Clare Grogan and Steve Sweeney
- "Bury It", a 2012 song by Alter Der Ruine
- "Bury It", a 2012 song by Palisades from I'm Not Dying Today
