= My Devil in Your Eyes =

Studio album by The Color Morale
- Released: March 8, 2011
- Recorded: 2010
- Studio: Foundation Recording Studio, Connersville, Indiana; Random Awesome! Recording Studio, Bay City, Michigan
- Genre: Metalcore; post-hardcore
- Length: 35:40
- Label: Rise
- Producer: Joey Sturgis

The Color Morale chronology
We All Have Demons (2009)	My Devil in Your Eyes (2011)	Know Hope (2013)

Singles from My Devil in Your Eyes
- 1. "Human(s)being" Released: January 26, 2011

My Devil in Your Eyes is the second studio album by American metalcore band The Color Morale. It was released on March 8, 2011 through Rise Records and was produced by Joey Sturgis. It is the last album to feature guitarist John Bross, who left the band in 2011.

== Critical reception ==
Professional ratings
Review scores
Source	Rating
JesusFreakHideout	4/5 stars
Sputnikmusic	3/5 stars

The album got mixed reviews. JesusFreakHideout rated the album 4 out of 5, writing: "Now, I know those have legitimate, non-offensive uses, but I felt unclear about whether they threw those lyrics in with the non-offensive meanings implied, to sound passionate, to sound mainstream, or to just create controversy. Regardless of its intentions, I was a little turned off by that because I'd been looking for some good God-loving Christian music and got a tiny surprise there. Aside from that, the length of the record is only 36 minutes and 10 songs, which seems a little short to me. But My Devil in Your Eyes is a good album, and everytime I start listening to it I'm satisfied with my purchase. I'd recommend it to fans of Sent By Ravens, I Am Alpha And Omega, Blessthefall, Ballast, and all that good post-hardcore stuff."

== Track listing ==
No.	Title	Length
1.	"Nerve Endings"	3:07
2.	"Human(s)being" (featuring Chad Ruhlig of For the Fallen Dreams)	3:48
3.	"The Dying Hymn"	3:39
4.	"Be Longing Always"	4:03
5.	"Walkers"	3:17
6.	"Demon Teeth" (featuring Joey Sturgis)	2:58
7.	"Falling Awake"	3:33
8.	"Quote on Quote" (featuring Chris Roetter of Like Moths to Flames)	3:40
9.	"This Lost Song Is Yours"	3:53
10.	"Fill;Avoid"	3:36
Total length:		35:40

== Personnel ==
Credits adapted from AllMusic.

The Color Morale

- Garret Rapp – lead vocals, keyboards
- Ramon Mendoza – lead guitar
- John Bross – rhythm guitar, backing vocals
- Justin Hieser – bass, vocals
- Steve Carey – drums

Additional musicians

- Chad Ruhlig of For the Fallen Dreams – additional vocals on track 2, "Human(s)being"
- Kellin Quinn of Sleeping with Sirens – chorus lyrics on track 3, "The Dying Hymn"
- Chris Roetter of Like Moths to Flames – additional vocals on track 8, "Quote on Quote"

Additional personnel

- Joey Sturgis – engineering, mixing, mastering, production, guest vocals on track 6, "Demon Teeth"
- Nick Sampson – engineering, vocal editing
- Josh Schroeder – guest vocal tracking
- Jeff Dunne – editing
- Mark Hladish – logo design
- Sons of Nero – layout design
