= Dark Divine =

Studio album by Like Moths to Flames
- Released: November 3, 2017
- Genre: Metalcore; post-hardcore
- Length: 42:28
- Label: Rise
- Producer: Erik Ron

Like Moths to Flames chronology
The Dying Things We Live For (2015)	Dark Divine (2017)	No Eternity in Gold (2020)

Singles from Dark Divine
- 1. "Nowhere Left to Sink" Released: September 27, 2017; 2. "Dark Divine" Released: October 7, 2017; 3. "Empty the Same" Released: October 14, 2017; 4. "Shallow Truths for Shallow Minds" Released: October 21, 2017; 5. "From the Dust Returned" Released: October 28, 2017

Dark Divine is the fourth studio album by American metalcore band Like Moths to Flames. The album was released on November 3, 2017, through Rise Records and was produced by Erik Ron. It is the band's first release with rhythm guitarist Zach Pishney. It is also the last album to feature Greg Diamond as drummer and the last to be released on this label.

== Background and promotion ==
On September 27, 2017, the band released the lead single "Nowhere Left to Sink" and its corresponding music video. They released the second single and title track, "Dark Divine" on October 7. The third single, "Empty the Same" was released on October 14. The fourth single, "Shallow Truths for Shallow Minds" was released on October 21. The final and fifth single, "From the Dust Returned" was released on October 28.

== Critical reception ==
Professional ratings
Review scores
Source	Rating
Louder Sound	2.5/5 stars
New Noise	4.5/5 stars
Original Rock	8/10
Rock Sound	6/10
Sputnikmusic	3.5/5 stars

The album received mostly positive reviews, but also mixed reviews from several critics. Louder Sound gave the album a slightly negative review and stated: "Modern metalcore often sticks to such a rigid formula that it can be difficult to see any innovation beneath it." New Noise gave the album 4.5 out of 5 and stated: "Still, the band keeps their heavy hearts right on at the sleeve; Like Moths to Flames have not lost any of their brutality in this transition. Dark Divine is a great metal record that has range without actually losing itself in the process. Things are kept close at hand, while also standing out for their maturation. Like Moths to Flames have not lost a bit of a steam in the last seven years with Rise Records, and if Dark Divine can be counted on for what's to come, they'll still be around for years yet."

Original Rock gave the album a score 8/10 and saying: "Overall, a good album with some punchy tunes that are brilliantly written with good production. My advice to you is, don't judge this album solely by the first 2 tracks, give it time to envelop your body and completely open you up to the heavy hard-core slams and breakdowns that prevail. Written in order similar to a story, you have the light-hearted start of the album, the curious twist, the meaty chapters that keep you hooked and the cliff hanger that leaves you wanting to re-listen to this story over and over again. This album will open doors (if they aren't already) wide open for Like Moths To Flames, the amount of passion, time and effort put into this creation is defiantly portrayed in Dark Divine." Rock Sound gave it 6 out of 10 and said: "The band's fourth album (mixed by Beartooth's Caleb Shomo no less) is another worthy addition to their catalogue. Looking for mighty choruses? 'Nowhere Left To Sink' is your tune. Breakneck circle pit anthems? 'Instinctive Intuition' has you covered. Or just totally savage riffs? 'Mischief Managed' will straight-up sort you out. None of it is new or radical by any means – and this may not prove to be their breakthrough record – but if you're after some decent quality mosh, look no further."

== Track listing ==
No.	Title	Length
1.	"New Plagues"	3:55
2.	"Nowhere Left to Sink"	3:50
3.	"Shallow Truths for Shallow Minds"	3:39
4.	"Dark Divine"	3:41
5.	"Empty the Same"	3:55
6.	"From the Dust Returned"	4:05
7.	"Even God Has a Hell"	4:24
8.	"Mischief Managed"	3:34
9.	"Instinctive Intuition"	3:44
10.	"The Skeletons I Keep"	4:04
11.	"False Idol"	3:31
Total length:		42:28

== Personnel ==
Like Moths to Flames

- Chris Roetter – lead vocals
- Jeremy Smith – lead guitar
- Zach Pishney – rhythm guitar
- Aaron Evans – bass, backing vocals
- Greg Diamond – drums, percussion

Additional personnel

- Erik Ron – production
