= The Cycles of Trying to Cope =

Studio album by Like Moths to Flames
- Released: May 10, 2024
- Genre: Metalcore
- Length: 40:35
- Label: UNFD
- Producers: Carson Slovak; Grant McFarland

Like Moths to Flames chronology
Pure Like Porcelain (2021)	The Cycles of Trying to Cope (2024)	Does Heaven Ever Mourn for Me (2026)

Singles from The Cycles of Trying to Cope
- 1. "Paradigm Trigger" Released: February 7, 2024; 2. "Angels Weep" Released: February 7, 2024; 3. "Kintsugi" Released: March 7, 2024; 4. "Dissociative Being" Released: April 11, 2024

The Cycles of Trying to Cope is the sixth studio album by American metalcore band Like Moths to Flames. It was released on May 10, 2024, through UNFD. The album was produced by Carson Slovak and Grant McFarland. It is the band's first album to feature drummer Roman Garcia and guitarist Cody Cavanaugh.

== Background and promotion ==
On February 7, 2024, the band released two new singles "Paradigm Trigger" and "Angels Weep" with a corresponding music video for the former. On March 7, the band unveiled the third single "Kintsugi" along with a music video. At the same time, they announced the album itself and the release date, while also revealing the album cover and the track list. On April 11, the band premiered the fourth single "Dissociative Being".

== Critical reception ==
Professional ratings
Review scores
Source	Rating
Blabbermouth.net	8/10
Distorted Sound	8/10
New Transcendence	9/10
Spill	4.5/5

The album received positive reviews from critics. Anne Erickson from Blabbermouth.net gave the album 8 out of 10 and said: "Like Moths to Flames are absolutely triumphant on The Cycles of Trying to Cope, and it should be well-received by new and old fans alike. Next time around, it would be nice to see this band dip into more experimentation, as they certainly have the talent to branch out. But, for now, The Cycles of Trying to Cope is more than worthy of repeat listens." Katie Bird of Distorted Sound scored the album 8 out of 10 and said: "Overall, The Cycles of Trying to Cope is cohesive, fun to listen to, and accessible to new fans. Whilst it isn't perfect, as some of the songs in the middle suffer from production issues, the rest of the album is a masterclass in how to balance two genres at once. By scattering elements of electronica throughout the first three songs, for example, it does not feel out of place for the fourth song to have a heavy electronic metal sound. By doing this throughout the album, the band make sure that the genre changes do not sound sudden. The instruments and vocals throughout are fantastic, and the pacing is – mostly – cohesive, and all told this makes for a brilliant addition to the band's discography."

New Transcendence praised the album saying, "I was astounded, and continue to be astounded at The Cycles of Trying to Cope. A record I expected to enjoy I've ended up loving, and while there may be one or two songs that fall just flat of the heights set by 'Kintsugi', 'Gone Without a Trace' and 'What Do We See When We Leave This Place?' They are by no means slouches. Like Moths to Flames' sixth full-length record is their finest, and a contender for one of 2024's apex metalcore records with precious little in the way of tangible flaws. It remains to be seen how Like Moths to Flames come to terms with trying to cope, but I can only hope they have cycles of churning out more records like this long into the future." Samantha Andujar from Spill gave the album almost a perfect score 4.5/5 and saying: "The Cycles of Trying to Cope addresses these issues by bringing together these complex emotions and various musical threads to create not just one of their finest records to date, but also a fantastic concept album."

== Track listing ==
All tracks are written by Chris Roetter, Cody Cavanaugh, Roman Garcia, and Zach Pishney.

The Cycles of Trying to Cope track listing
No.	Title	Length
1.	"Angels Weep"	3:38
2.	"Paradigm Trigger"	3:21
3.	"Over the Garden Wall"	3:52
4.	"Gone Without a Trace"	4:15
5.	"Dissociative Being"	3:50
6.	"The Shepherd's Crown"	2:56
7.	"To Know Is to Die"	3:38
8.	"Kintsugi"	3:22
9.	"Everything That Once Held It Together"	3:51
10.	"The Depths I Roam"	4:08
11.	"What Do We See When We Leave This Place?"	3:44
Total length:		40:35

Physical release bonus track
No.	Title	Length
12.	"Soul Exchange"	2:55
Total length:		43:30

== Personnel ==
Like Moths to Flames

- Chris Roetter – lead vocals
- Zach Pishney – lead guitar, bass
- Cody Cavanaugh – rhythm guitar, bass
- Roman Garcia – drums, percussion

Additional personnel

- Carson Slovak – production, mixing, mastering
- Grant McFarland – production, mixing, mastering
