= Reaching Hypercritical =

Studio album by Palisades
- Released: July 22, 2022
- Length: 38:27
- Label: Rise
- Producer: Keith Nelson

Palisades chronology
Erase the Pain (2018)	Reaching Hypercritical (2022)

Singles from Reaching Hypercritical
- 1. "My Consequences" Released: December 6, 2021; 2. "Better" Released: March 11, 2022

Reaching Hypercritical is the fifth studio album by American post-hardcore band Palisades. The album was released on July 22, 2022, by Rise Records.

== Release ==
On December 1, 2021, the band announced that vocalist Louis Miceli Jr. would be leaving the band. Bassist Brandon Elgar then became lead vocalist. Shortly afterwards, after three years of no music, they released the new song "My Consequences" on December 6, 2021. On March 11, 2022, they released the single "Better" and announced the album.

The album was written during a tough time for the band, and members of the band said of the writing process of the album:

"This album really captures how the band has matured while being brutally honest with ourselves about all the tough moments that were going through our heads while making the record. Reaching Hypercritical is a true demonstration of how the past few years have changed us as people, as a band and what PALISADES' music stands for."

— Aaron Rosa,

"With everything we went through, we didn't know what was going to happen or if this band would even continue for us, but we stuck together and overcame these obstacles together. The goal of Reaching Hypercritical, more than anything, is to show people that they can do that too."

— Brandon Elgar,

== Musical style ==
Tamara May of Wall of Sound said that the single "Better" is "a soaring emo anthem, through its magnificent melodies and vulnerable lyrics that flow together ever so seamlessly. New listeners of the band will immediately feel similarities to Sleeping With Sirens and Issues."

== Track listing ==
All tracks are written by Palisades. "Better" and "Fray" co-written by Mark Vollelunga.

No.	Title	Length
1.	"My Consequences"	2:59
2.	"Reaching Hypercritical"	3:22
3.	"Invincible (Die Down)"	3:59
4.	"Your Misery"	3:53
5.	"Without You"	3:16
6.	"Better"	3:19
7.	"Fray"	4:10
8.	"Sick of the Attitude"	3:30
9.	"Fade Away"	3:15
10.	"Sober"	3:05
11.	"Closure"	3:39
Total length:		38:27

== Personnel ==
Palisades

- Brandon Elgar – lead vocals, bass guitar
- Xavier Adames – lead guitar, backing vocals
- Matthew Marshall – rhythm guitar
- Aaron Rosa – drums, percussion

Technical personnel

- Keith Nelson – producer, engineer
- Zakk Cervini – mixing
- Jun Murakawa – engineer
- Greg Foeller – assistant engineer
- Chris Athens – mastering
