= Mind Games (Palisades album) =

Studio album by Palisades
- Released: January 13, 2015
- Length: 36:25
- Label: Rise
- Producer: Erik Ron

Palisades chronology
Outcasts (2013)	Mind Games (2015)	Palisades (2017)

Singles from Mind Games
- 1. "Player Haters' Ball (feat. blackbear)" Released: December 3, 2014; 2. "Mind Games (feat. Champs)" Released: December 26, 2014; 3. "No Chaser" Released: April 27, 2015

Mind Games is the second studio album by American post-hardcore band Palisades. The album was released on January 13, 2015, by Rise Records. It debuted at number 81 on the Billboard 200, number 2 on the Heatseekers chart, number 5 on the Hard Rock Albums chart, number 17 on the Top Rock Albums, and number 59 on the Digital Albums chart.

== Track listing ==
No.	Title	Length
1.	"Player Haters' Ball" (featuring blackbear)	3:13
2.	"No Chaser"	4:01
3.	"Bad Girls"	3:33
4.	"Mind Games" (featuring Champs)	4:08
5.	"Whatever You Want It to Be"	3:58
6.	"Afraid"	3:48
7.	"People Like Us" (featuring Garret Rapp of The Color Morale)	3:35
8.	"Like a Drug"	3:37
9.	"True Blood"	3:40
10.	"Come Over and Watch Netflix"	2:52
Total length:		36:25

== Personnel ==
Palisades

- Louis Miceli - lead vocals, unclean vocals
- Xavier Adames - lead guitar, backing vocals
- Matthew Marshall - rhythm guitar, additional unclean vocals
- Earl Halasan - turntables, keyboards, synthesizer, programming
- Brandon Sidney - bass guitar, backing vocals, co-lead vocals
- Aaron Rosa - drums, percussion

Production

- Erik Ron - Producer
- Pete Rutcho - mixing, mastering, engineer

== Charts ==
Chart (2015)	Peak position
US Billboard 200	198
US Heatseekers Albums (Billboard)	2
US Independent Albums (Billboard)	13
US Top Rock Albums (Billboard)	17
