= Sweet Talker (EP) =

EP by Like Moths to Flames
- Released: December 14, 2010
- Recorded: 2010
- Genre: Metalcore; post-hardcore
- Length: 15:56
- Label: Rise
- Producer: Landon Tewers

Like Moths to Flames chronology
| Sweet Talker (2010) | When We Don't Exist (2011) |

Singles from Sweet Talker
- 1. "Dead Routine" Released: February 7, 2010; 2. "Real Talk" Released: October 27, 2010; 3. "Your Existence" Released: November 11, 2010

Sweet Talker is the first EP by American metalcore band Like Moths to Flames. It was released on December 14, 2010, through Rise Records and was produced by Landon Tewers, the lead vocalist of the band The Plot in You.

Sweet Talker is the band's first and only release with bassist Aaron Douglas and drummer Jordan Matz, who left the band in 2011. After Matz's departure, guitarist Aaron Evans switched to bass in the band, and in place of Douglas, Eli Ford joined on lead guitar and Lance Greenfield was introduced on drums.

== Critical reception ==
Professional ratings
Review scores
| Source | Rating |
|---|---|
| Dead Press! | 6/10 |
| Sputnikmusic | 2.5/5 stars |

The EP received mostly positive reviews from music critics. Zach Redrup from Dead Press! rated the EP positively but calling it: "Though it's intense, powerful and hellish from start to end, there's not much here that makes this band worth picking out more so than the flood of hundreds of other bands producing the same fairly generic post-hardcore/metalcore releases that are hitting the shelves week in and week out. This is only their debut EP release, and leaves much time for Like Moths To Flames to show their full worth and potential yet. There's still chance for these guys to pull out the big guns."

== Track listing ==
| No. | Title | Length |
|---|---|---|
| 1. | "Your Existence" (featuring Landon Tewers of The Plot in You) | 3:00 |
| 2. | "Real Talk" | 3:41 |
| 3. | "Death Cup" (originally entitled "Fuck Life") | 2:44 |
| 4. | "Bloodsport" | 3:00 |
| 5. | "Dead Routine" | 3:29 |
| Total length: | | 15:56 |

== Personnel ==
Like Moths to Flames

- Chris Roetter – lead vocals
- Aaron Evans – rhythm guitar
- Zach Huston – lead guitar
- Aaron Douglas – bass, backing vocals
- Jordan Matz – drums, percussion

Additional musicians

- Landon Tewers of The Plot in You – guest vocals on track 1, production
