= Erase the Pain =

Studio album by Palisades
- Released: December 28, 2018
- Genre: Post-hardcore
- Length: 32:38
- Label: Rise
- Producer: Howard Benson

Palisades chronology
Palisades (2017)	Erase the Pain (2018)	Reaching Hypercritical (2022)

Singles from Erase the Pain
- 1. "War" Released: October 5, 2018; 2. "Fragile Bones" Released: November 16, 2018

Professional ratings
Review scores
Source	Rating
Dead Press!	7/10 stars
New Fury	8/10

Erase the Pain is the fourth studio album by American post-hardcore band Palisades. The album was released on December 28, 2018, by Rise Records. It peaked at number 175 on the Billboard 200, number 1 on the Heatseekers chart, number 9 on the Hard Rock Albums chart, and number 1 on the Independent Albums chart. It is their last release to feature Louis Miceli Jr. on lead vocals, since he left the band on December 1, 2021.

== Track listing ==
Erase the Pain track listing
No.	Title	Length
1.	"Vendetta"	3:34
2.	"Erase the Pain"	3:17
3.	"Fade"	2:46
4.	"War"	2:58
5.	"Ways to Disappear"	3:57
6.	"Ghost"	3:28
7.	"Fragile Bones"	3:21
8.	"Push"	2:42
9.	"Patient"	3:20
10.	"Shed My Skin"	3:12
Total length:		32:38

== Personnel ==
Palisades

- Louis Miceli – lead vocals, unclean vocals
- Xavier Adames – lead guitar, backing vocals
- Matthew Marshall – rhythm guitar
- Brandon Elgar – bass guitar, backing vocals, co-lead vocals
- Aaron Rosa – drums, percussion
- Christian "DJ" Graves" Mochizuki – turntables, sampling, keyboards, synthesizers, programming

Additional personnel

- Howard Benson – producer, mixing, additional keyboards
- Mike Plotnikoff – engineer
- Hatsukazu Inagaki – engineer
- Zack Darff – assistant engineer
- Trevor Dietrich – assistant engineer
- Joe Rickard – mixing
- Brian Gardner – mastering

== Charts ==
Chart performance for Erase the Pain
Chart (2015)	Peak position
US Billboard 200	175
US Heatseekers Albums (Billboard)	1
US Independent Albums (Billboard)	1
US Top Hard Rock Albums (Billboard)	9
