= Hold On Pain Ends =

Studio album by The Color Morale
- Released: September 2, 2014
- Genre: Metalcore; post-hardcore; melodic hardcore
- Length: 44:12
- Label: Fearless
- Producer: Mike Green; Courtney Ballard

The Color Morale chronology
Know Hope (2013)	Hold On Pain Ends (2014)	Desolate Divine (2016)

Singles from Hold On Pain Ends
- 1. "Outer Demons" Released: June 23, 2014; 2. "Suicide;Stigma" Released: July 15, 2014; 3. "Damnaged" Released: August 11, 2014

Hold On Pain Ends is the fourth studio album by American metalcore band The Color Morale. It was released on September 2, 2014 through Fearless Records, and was produced by Mike Green and Courtney Ballard. This marks the band's first album on this label following their departure from Rise Records.

== Background ==
The album title was revealed along with the band's announcement of switching record labels, from Rise to Fearless Records, in April. The band were also featured on the fifteenth installment of the Punk Goes... series, Punk Goes 90s Vol. 2 which featured their cover of "Everlong" by Foo Fighters that same month. Further details, track list, album artwork, and release date, were announced on July 2, 2014. The track list revealed that there would be two featuring guest artists; Dave Stephens of We Came as Romans and Craig Owens of Chiodos and was produced by Mike Green.

== Composition ==
=== Influences, style and themes ===
Lead vocalist Garret Rapp explained to Alternative Press of the album's lyrical theme, stating that it discusses issues such as; self-harm and sabotage, suicide, addictions, eating disorders, abandonment along with other related topics shared with him by fans, going on to say that the record itself was made for the listener as a means of telling a story of inner beauty ignored by false belief.

== Release and promotion ==
In April, Alternative Press announced the nominees for their first Alternative Press Music Awards (APMAs). The band released their first song off the album on June 23, two months after the initial announcements of their label switch, their new album, and their APMA nomination. The song, titled "Outer Demons", was released along with a promotional lyric video. Pre-orders of the album were made available on the day the album was announced on July 2. On July 16, the band released their second single "Suicide;Stigma" which features guest vocals Dave Stephens of We Came as Romans. On August 11, the band released their third single "Damnaged", the opening track to the album.

== Critical reception ==
Professional ratings
Aggregate scores
Source	Rating
Metacritic	74/100
Review scores
Source	Rating
AllMusic	3/5 stars
Dead Press!	8/10

The album was met with generally positive reviews, most citing the lyrical content, and Rapp's vocals. At Metacritic, which assigns a normalised rating out of 100 to reviews from mainstream critics, the album has an average score of 74 out of 100 based on 4 reviews, indicating "generally favorable reviews". A reviewer for AbsolutePunk wrote: "... Rapp's vocal delivery is compelling on nearly every chorus, particularly "Damnaged" and "Developing Negative". I'd say this is one of the largest reasons why I keep coming back to this record over and over again."

AllMusic gave the album a positive review saying, "The usual glitchy electronic elements weave throughout the album's ten songs and there is a strong pop element in many of the arrangements. While Hold on Pain Ends is generally well played and well produced, little new ground has been broken and by and large it comes across as a fairly standard, mainstream pop-oriented metalcore record." Zach Redrup from Dead Press! rated the album positively calling it: "Unapologetic in its message, this is a record which manages to portray its over-arching sentiment without diluting the strident musicality and fist-pumping dramatics. It all falls together to make a formidable impression, and whether it's the poignancy or the distinctive punch that's taken away, Hold On Pain Ends is an intensely thrilling piece of work." Another reviewer for Under the Gun praised the collaboration between the band and Craig Owens of Chiodos and saying: "...most memorable mic grab comes from Chiodos' Craig Owens on 'Developing Negative' a track that also highlights the integration of guitarists Aaron Saunders and Devin King, who have come into their own on this release."

== Commercial performance ==
The album debuted at No. 28 on Billboard 200, selling around 8,000 copies in the first week. It has sold 19,000 copies in the United States as of July 2016.

== Track listing ==
No.	Title	Length
1.	"Damnaged"	3:18
2.	"Outer Demons"	3:34
3.	"Prey for Me"	3:36
4.	"Lifeline (Left to Write)"	3:32
5.	"Scar Issue"	3:10
6.	"Suicide;Stigma" (featuring Dave Stephens of We Came as Romans)	3:40
7.	"The Ones Forgotten by the One Forgetting"	2:08
8.	"Developing Negative" (featuring Craig Owens of Chiodos)	4:36
9.	"Is Happiness a Mediocre Sin?"	3:21
10.	"Between You and Eye"	4:16
11.	"Throw Your Roses"	4:04
12.	"Hold On Pain Ends"	4:57
Total length:		44:12

== Personnel ==
Credits adapted from AllMusic.

The Color Morale

- Garret Rapp – lead vocals, keyboards
- Devin King – lead guitar
- Aaron Saunders – rhythm guitar, vocals
- Mike Honson – bass, backing vocals
- Steve Carey – drums

Additional musicians

- Dave Stephens of We Came as Romans – guest vocals on track 6, "Suicide;Stigma"
- Craig Owens of Chiodos – guest vocals on track 8, "Developing Negative"

Additional personnel

- Mike Green – engineering, production
- Courtney Ballard – engineering, production
- Jacob Bautista and Devon Corey – engineering assistance
- Kyle Black – mixing
- Pepe Acevedo, Luis Aceves, Christian Alexander, Anthony Arevelo, Manuel Beltran, Abigail Birchfield, Kristin Biskup, Aldo Elizalde, Mark Fuentes, Emma Gadbois, Clayton Garrison, Jonathan Gonzalez, Michael Kelley, Lynn Kelly, Ashlie Mackenzie, Lorraine Marquez, Alyson Meikle, Autumn Nichole, Aaron Reed, Richard Rodriguez, Abby Schatz, Robert Weidner, Sal Torres and Katrina Wolf – background vocals
- Kristin Biskup – management
- Chris Foitle and Sal Torres – A&R

== Charts ==
Chart (2014)	Peak position
US Billboard 200	28
US Independent Albums (Billboard)	6
US Top Alternative Albums (Billboard)	2
US Top Hard Rock Albums (Billboard)	1
US Top Rock Albums (Billboard)	5
