= We All Have Demons =

Studio album by The Color Morale
- Released: September 1, 2009
- Recorded: 2009
- Studio: Foundation Recording Studio, Connersville, Indiana
- Genre: Metalcore; post-hardcore
- Length: 34:29
- Label: Rise
- Producer: Joey Sturgis

The Color Morale chronology
We All Have Demons (2009)	My Devil in Your Eyes (2011)

We All Have Demons is the debut studio album by American metalcore band The Color Morale. It was released on September 1, 2009 through Rise Records and was produced by Joey Sturgis. A music video was released for the single "Humannequin".

== Critical reception ==
Professional ratings
Review scores
Source	Rating
indievisionmusic	4/5 stars
JesusFreakHideout	4/5 stars

The album received mostly positive reviews, but also mixed reviews from several critics. JesusFreakHideout rated the album 4 out of 5 and stated: "At the end of this 34-minute album, you realize The Color Morale does it better than most in the genre. There's nothing unique here, but it's more excellent than you would expect from a fairly young band. Their sound is more mature than their age. If you like Underoath, Gwen Stacy, or A Bullet For Pretty Boy, than this one could be your next favorite."

== Track listing ==
No.	Title	Length
1.	"The Sage of Washington Oaks"	1:51
2.	"Close Your Eyes and Look Away"	3:35
3.	"When One Was Desolate"	4:15
4.	"Humannequin"	3:15
5.	"Resource: Recourse"	2:13
6.	"A Sponge in the Ocean"	3:26
7.	"Hopes Anchor" (featuring Brian Tombari of City of Ghosts)	4:57
8.	"Manumission"	1:23
9.	"The Man Behind the Hands"	4:19
10.	"I, the Jury"	5:10
Total length:		34:29

== Personnel ==
Credits adapted from AllMusic.

The Color Morale

- Garret Rapp – lead vocals, keyboards
- Ramon Mendoza – lead guitar
- John Bross – rhythm guitar, backing vocals
- Justin Hieser – bass, vocals
- Steve Carey – drums

Additional musicians

- Brian Tombari of City of Ghosts – guest vocals on track 7, "Hopes Anchor"

Additional personnel

- Joey Sturgis – engineering, mixing, mastering, production
- Synapse Design – art direction, design
- Midwestlove Art and Design – band logo
- Glenn Thomas – photography
