= Know Hope =

Studio album by The Color Morale
- Released: March 25, 2013
- Recorded: October–December 2012
- Studios: Random Awesome! Recording Studio, Bay City, Michigan
- Genres: Metalcore; post-hardcore; melodic hardcore
- Length: 46:23
- Label: Rise
- Producers: Josh Schroeder; Ramon Mendoza; Joshua Moore; The Color Morale

The Color Morale chronology
My Devil in Your Eyes (2011)	Know Hope (2013)	Hold On Pain Ends (2014)

Singles from Know Hope
- 1. "Learned Behavior" Released: February 1, 2013; 2. "Strange Comfort" Released: March 7, 2013

Vinyl cover
- Artwork used for the physical vinyl cover.

Know Hope is the third studio album by American metalcore band The Color Morale. It was released on March 20, 2013 through Rise Records and was produced by Josh Schroeder, Ramon Mendoza, Joshua Moore and the band themselves. It is the last album to be released on this label.

== Background and recording ==
By mid-2012, the band was in the process of writing their third album, believed to be entitled Know Hope, and originally expecting a 2012 or 2013 release. The band wrote twenty-two songs, twelve of which were finalized into the album. Josh Schroeder produced, engineered, mixed, and mastered the record from October to December 2012.

== Critical reception ==
Professional ratings
Aggregate scores
Source	Rating
Metacritic	67/100
Review scores
Source	Rating
AllMusic	3.5/5 stars
Dead Press!	5/10
indievisionmusic	4/5 stars
New Transcendence	9.1/10
Rock Sins	9/10
Rock Sound	7/10
Sputnikmusic	3.5/5 stars

The album received mostly positive reviews, but also mixed reviews from several critics. At Metacritic, which assigns a normalised rating out of 100 to reviews from mainstream critics, the album has an average score of 67 out of 100 based on 6 reviews, indicating "generally favorable reviews". AllMusic gave the album a positive review saying, "On their third effort, Rockford, Illinois metalcore group the Color Morale continue to rip out blistering metal, alternating between screaming verses and melodic choruses, but their abilities on both sides of the spectrum are better than ever. Like on We All Have Demons and My Devil in Your Eyes, there is an incredible level of intensity throughout Know Hope. Punishing breakdowns and post-prog guitar riffs punctuate the screamo moments, but Garret Rapp's ability to work in a big, clean, anthemic hook is the X factor that separates the five-piece from the sea of hardcore/emo sound-alikes."

Zach Redrup from Dead Press! rated the album positively calling it: "Back to the original question: why is the newer wave of "tumblr-core" bands more popular? Well, mostly because they're more interesting. Whether you hate them for it or not, other bands do this same style but with a catch or an element that The Color Morale are missing, and because of this they may continue to fall under the radar." New Transcendence gave the album almost a perfect score 9.1/10 and saying: "Know Hope is The Color Morale's third full length album, and released on March the twenty-sixth through Rise Records. There is so much more I could say about this album – so much I could just spend forever talking about, but I don't want to take away from the time you could be spending listening to it! You can pick this album up at Hot Topic, on iTunes or on the band's merch site – grab it and get down with this sick piece of art!"

Lisa Fox of Rock Sins rated the album 9 out of 10 and said: "The bottom line is that The Color Morale play diverse, competent metalcore music. We're just sorry it took till album three for us to hear about them. Although it has to be said, Know Hope is a triumph. The Color Morale are what this generation needs; they are the quintessential heirs to the throne recently vacated by Alexisonfire. Listen to them and you'll be able to say, 'I knew them before they hit the big time' because it won't be long."

== Track listing ==
All tracks are written by The Color Morale, except where noted.

No.	Title	Writer(s)	Length
1.	"Burn Victims"		3:39
2.	"Smoke and Mirrors"	The Color Morale, Ramon Mendoza	3:41
3.	"Learned Behavior" (featuring Kailey Saunders)	The Color Morale, Joshua Moore	3:57
4.	"Living Breathing Something"	The Color Morale, Ramon Mendoza	3:06
5.	"Strange Comfort"	The Color Morale, Joshua Moore	3:53
6.	"In Light in Me"		3:42
7.	"Silver Lining"		2:59
8.	"Steadfast"		4:54
9.	"Hole Hearted"		3:37
10.	"Saviorself"		5:05
11.	"Have.Will"	The Color Morale, Ramon Mendoza	4:17
12.	"Never Enders"		3:33
Total length:			46:23

== Personnel ==
Credits adapted from AllMusic.

The Color Morale

- Garret Rapp – lead vocals, keyboards
- Devin King – lead guitar
- Aaron Saunders – rhythm guitar, backing vocals
- Justin Hieser – bass, vocals
- Steve Carey – drums

Additional musicians

- Kailey Saunders – guest vocals on track 3, "Learned Behavior"

Additional personnel

- Josh Schroeder – engineering, mixing, mastering, production
- The Color Morale – production
- Ramon Mendoza – production
- Joshua Moore – production
- Matthew Stewart – management
- Mike Cubillos – publicity
- Jeremy Holgerson and Bryan Vastano – booking
- Travis Smith – cover art
- Aaron Marsh – layout design

== Charts ==
Chart	Peak position
Billboard 200	106
Top Heatseekers	1
Top Independent Albums	22
