= Palisades (band) =

American rock band

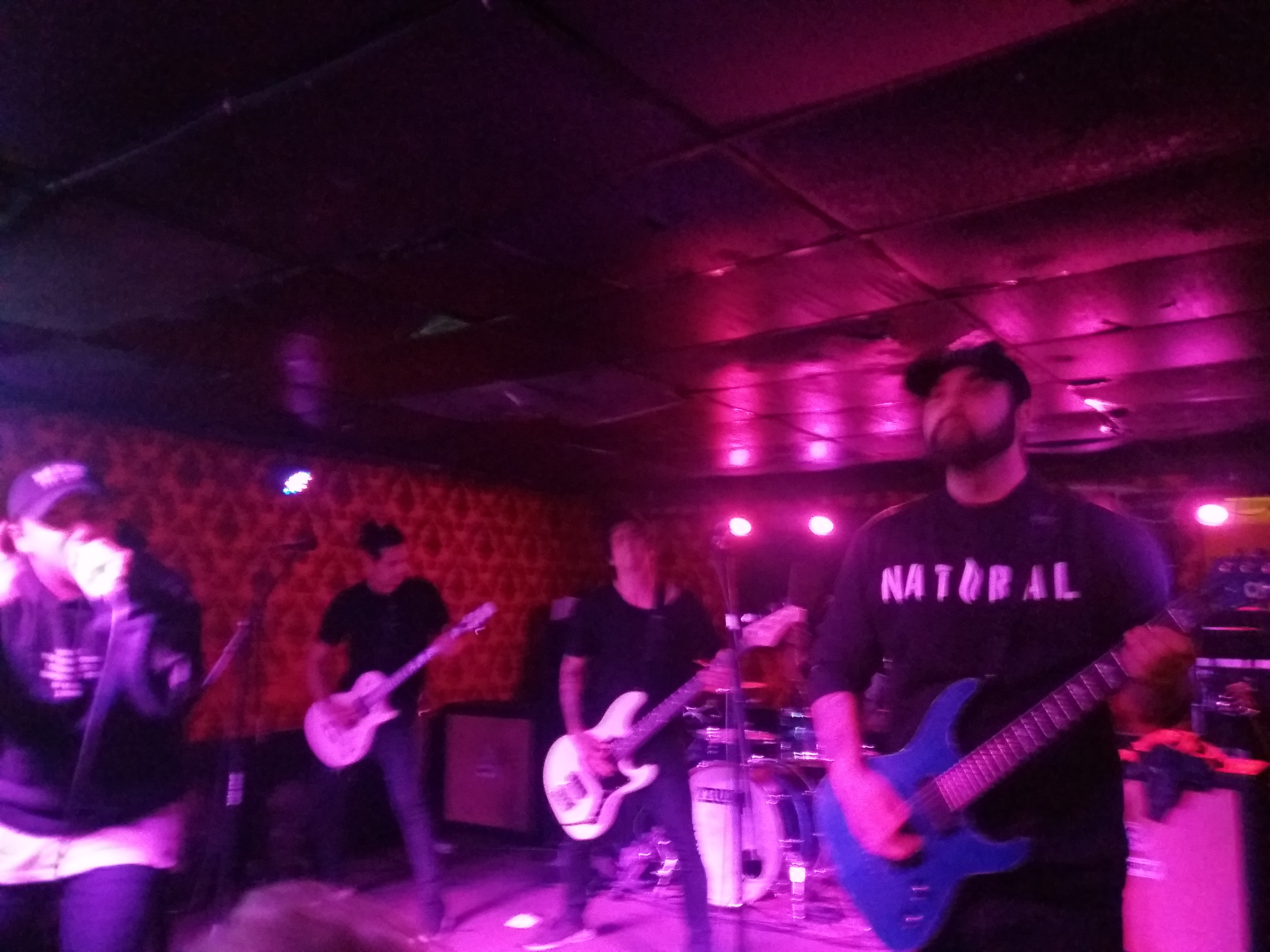
- Palisades in 2016

Background information
- Also known as: Marilyn Is Dead (2008–2011)
- Origin: Iselin, New Jersey, U.S.
- Genres: Post-hardcore; electronicore
- Years active: 2008–2023, 2026–present
- Label: Rise
- Members: Aaron Rosa; Xavier Adames; Matthew Marshall; Lou Miceli; Earl Halasan
- Past members: Alex Farkas; Chris Aleixo; Brandon Sidney; Brandon Elgar

Palisades is an American rock band from Iselin, New Jersey. Formed in 2008 as Marilyn Is Dead, they changed their name to Palisades in August 2011 and signed to Rise Records. Palisades has released one EP titled I’m Not Dying Today in 2012, and five studio albums; Outcasts in 2013, Mind Games in 2015, a self-titled album in 2017, Erase the Pain in 2018, and their most recent Reaching Hypercritical on 22 July 2022. They have a second upcoming EP set to release on January 8th, 2027 titled Faking My Death To Get To Heaven. They also have one self-released album under their previous name.

== History ==
The band formed in January 2008 as Marilyn Is Dead and self-released one album, Appearance Disappear, in 2009. Subsequently, the band saw two lineup changes, with bassist Chris Aleixo being replaced by Brandon Sidney in 2010 and vocalist Alex Farkas being replaced by Louis Miceli in 2011. This change in vocalist also came with a change of the band name to Palisades in August that year, and the self-release of their first EP, The Rise. The EP and its singles - "Immortal", "Bury It" and "Disclosure" (featuring Tyler Smith of The Word Alive) - gained Palisades the attention of Rise Records, who signed them later that year. Rise Records chose to re-release the EP in February 2012 under the new title, I'm Not Dying Today, while the band began work on a full-length debut album. After touring and working on the album throughout 2012, the band released Outcasts in May 2013. To promote the album, they released a single titled "Outcasts", and toured with Capture The Crown, Heartist, and Famous Last Words. Outcasts debuted at #181 on the Billboard top 200 chart. The band continued to release songs into 2014, including their cover of Beyoncé's hit single "Drunk in Love".

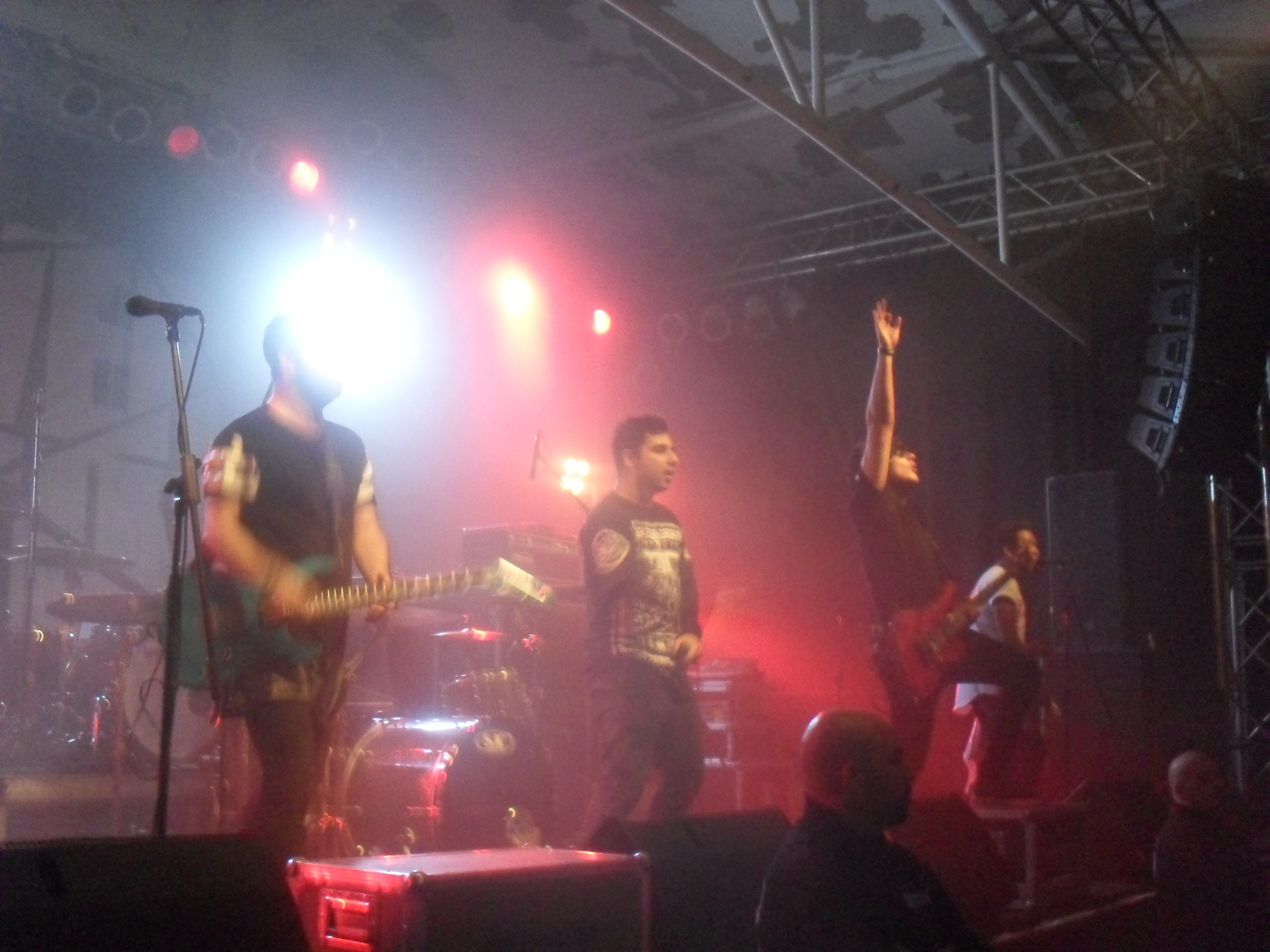
Palisades performing in 2013

On May 28, 2014, the band announced that they would be heading to the studio to begin work on their second album. Vocalist Lou Miceli released a statement regarding the overall sound of the band's second album stating: "We’re so excited to finally be in the studio recording our second album. We have grown so much since our last album and may have really established a sound that is truly just PALISADES. We feel like we are able to capture the energy of our live shows and put it into an actual recording this time around. We are not holding anything back and can’t wait to make our mark with this sophomore release."

On February 13, 2016, Palisades revealed that members Brandon Sidney and Earl Halasan had quit the band to pursue other endeavors, and that Brandon Elgar would be the new bass player and second vocalist, and DJ/Producer Christian Mochizuki known as GRAVES would be the band's new DJ/ studio member. The band had expressed that both new members were better fits personally and had the musicianship to drive the band's new sound to a stronger presence.

In 2016, Palisades covered the My Chemical Romance song "House of Wolves" for a Rock Sound tribute CD.

Palisades released their self-titled studio album on January 20, 2017 via Rise Records. The band stated in multiple interviews that the sound for Palisades on the album is "kind of definitive".

In 2017, the ensemble toured with American hard rock band Letters from the Fire.

In 2018, the ensemble toured once again with American hard rock ensemble Letters from the Fire. On October 5, 2018, they released the single "War" from their new album Erase the Pain, and toured with Dayseeker and Savage Hands in support of it. Erase the Pain was released on December 28, 2018. The band toured with Nothing More, Of Mice & Men and Badflower in February 2019.

On December 1, 2021, Palisades announced the departure of Lou Miceli Jr, and that Brandon Elgar would become the band's lead vocalist going forward. On December 6, 2021, the band released "My Consequences", their first single with Elgar as the sole lead vocalist. On March 11, 2022, the band released the single "Better", and announced their fifth album, Reaching Hypercritical, which was released on July 22, 2022.

On October 27, 2022, the band announced via their Twitter account that vocalist Brandon Elgar had chosen to leave the band, leading them to withdraw from their upcoming tour with Secrets. On January 11, 2023, the band officially confirmed that they will break up after one last show, scheduled on February 25, 2023. They also announced that they would be joined by former vocalist Lou Miceli and keyboardist Earl Halasan for this show

On September 1st, 2026 the band posted a couple of video teasers on their social media teasing an upcoming new song to be released on September 4th 2026 titled “nEverclear”, officially marking the band’s return with Xavier Adames, Matthew Marshall, Aaron Rosa, Earl Halasan, and Lou Miceli as the returning lineup of the band. The band released the new single along with an announcement of a reunion show celebrating the 10 year anniversary of their self titled album on January 30th 2027 at the Wellmont Theater in Montclair NJ. On November 13th 2026 the band released a second single titled “underwater” with an announcement of a new EP titled “Faking My Death To Get To Heaven” releasing January 8th 2027.

== Band members ==
- Xavier Adames – lead guitar, backing vocals (2008-2023, 2026-present), bass (2022–2023, 2026–present)
- Matthew Marshall – rhythm guitar, backing unclean vocals (2008–2023, 2026-present), bass (2022–2023, 2026–present)
- Aaron Rosa – drums, percussion (2008–2023, 2026-present)
- Earl Halasan – turntables, sampling, keyboards, synthesizers, programming (2008–2016, 2023, 2026-present), lead and rhythm guitar (2008–2013)
- Louis "Lou" Miceli Jr – lead vocals (2011–2021, 2023, 2026-present)

Session musicians

- Christian "Graves" Mochizuki – turntables, sampling, keyboards, synthesizers, programming (2016–2022)

Former members

- Alex Farkas – lead vocals (2008–2011)
- Chris Aleixo – bass, backing vocals (2008–2010)
- Brandon Sidney – bass, backing vocals, co-lead vocals (2010–2016)
- Brandon Elgar – bass (2016–2022); co-lead vocals (2016–2021), lead vocals (2021-2022)

Timeline

== Discography ==
=== Studio albums ===
List of studio albums, with selected chart positions
Title	Album details	Peak chart positions				
Title	Album details	US	US Heat	US Rock	US Hard	US Indie
Appearance Disappear	Released: April 7, 2009; Label: Self-released	—	—	—	—	—
Outcasts	Released: May 20, 2013; Label: Rise; Formats: CD, LP, digital download	— (Note: Outcasts did not enter the Billboard 200 chart.)	7	—	—	—
Mind Games	Released: January 13, 2015; Label: Rise; Formats: CD, LP, digital download	198	2	17	5	13
Palisades	Released: January 20, 2017; Label: Rise; Formats: CD, LP, digital download	— (Note: Palisades did not enter the Billboard 200 chart.)	3	—	18	12
Erase the Pain	Released: December 28, 2018; Label: Rise; Formats: CD, LP, digital download	175	1	35	9	1
Reaching Hypercritical	Released: July 22, 2022; Label: Rise; Formats: CD, LP, digital download	—	—	—	—	—

=== EP ===
- I'm Not Dying Today (2012)
- Faking My Death To Get To Heaven (releasing January 8th 2027)

=== Singles ===
Title	Year	Album
"Bury It"	2012	I'm Not Dying Today (EP)
"Disclosure"	2012	I'm Not Dying Today (EP)
"Outcasts" (featuring Andy Leo from Crown the Empire)	2013	Outcasts
"High and Low" (featuring Tyler Carter of Issues)	2014	Outcasts
"Player Haters' Ball" (featuring blackbear)	2014	Mind Games
"Mind Games" (featuring Champs)	2014	Mind Games
"No Chaser"	2015	Mind Games
"Fall"	2016	Palisades
"Aggression"	2016	Palisades
"Through Hell"	2016	Palisades
"War"	2018	Erase the Pain
"Fragile Bones"	2018	Erase the Pain
"My Consequences"	2021	Reaching Hypercritical
"Better"	2022	Reaching Hypercritical
"Reaching Hypercritical"	2022	Reaching Hypercritical
"Sober"	2022	Reaching Hypercritical
"nEverclear"	2026	Faking My Death To Get To Heaven (EP)
"underwater"	2026	Faking My Death To Get To Heaven (EP)

=== Compilation appearances ===
Year	Song	Album
2014	"Happy" (Pharrell Williams cover)	Punk Goes Pop Vol. 6
2014	High and Low	Another Techno Jawn
2016	"House of Wolves" (My Chemical Romance cover)	Rock Sound Presents: The Black Parade

== Music videos ==
- "Bury It" (2012)
- "Disclosure" featuring Tyler "Telle" Smith of The World Alive (2012)
- "Outcasts" featuring Andy Leo from Crown the Empire (2013)
- "High and Low" featuring Tyler Carter of Issues (2014)
- "Mind Games" featuring Champs (2014)
- "Player Haters’ Ball" featuring blackbear (2014)
- "No Chaser" (2015)
- "Fall" (2016)
- "Let Down" (2017)
- "Better Chemicals" (2017)
- "Through Hell" (2018)
- "War" (2018)
- "Erase The Pain" (2019)
- "My Consequences" (2021)
- "Better" (2022)
- "Sober" (2022)

== Tours ==
Tour name	Participating bands	Country/Continent	Participating from – to
The Revived Tour	Us, From Outside, A Faylene Sky, Palisades, Send The Messenger	North America	February – March 2012
The Jamboree 3 Festival	Like Moths to Flames, The Acacia Strain, The Black Dahlia Murder, Palisades, and more	North America	April 2012
Rise Records Freshman Class of 2012 Tour	The Air I Breathe, My Ticket Home, Hands Like Houses, Palisades	North America	May 2012
The Freedom Isn't Free Tour	Our Last Night, Crown the Empire, Set It Off, Palisades, Lions Lions, 'Alive, in Standby'	North America	June 2012
The Canadian Takeover Tour	My Ticket Home, Palisades, Horizons	North America	September 2012
The Infamous Tour	Abandon All Ships, Skip the Foreplay, For All Those Sleeping, Upon This Dawning, Palisades	North America	October 2012
The Filthy February Pt 1 Tour	I See Stars, For All Those Sleeping, Get Scared, Upon This Dawning, Palisades	North America	February 2013
The Rise Records Tour 2013	Like Moths to Flames, Crown the Empire, The Color Morale, Palisades, My Ticket Home	North America	April 2013
The Generation Now Tour	Crown the Empire, Capture the Crown, Palisades, Heartist, Famous Last Words	North America	May 2013
The Fear Inside Our Bones Tour	The Almost, Palisades, Sugar Glider	North America	June 2013
The Started at the Bottom, Now We're Here Tour	I See Stars, The Word Alive, Crown The Empire, Get Scared, Dayshell, Palisades	North America	October – November 2013
This Is How The Wind Shifts Europe Tour	Silverstein, Dream On Dreamer, Palisades	Europe	November – December 2013
Ride or Die Tour	Palisades, Famous Last Words, Tear Out The Heart, So Many Ways, One Last Look	North America	January – February 2014
The Acceptance Speech Tour	Dance Gavin Dance, Capture the Crown, Palisades, Bleach Blonde, Hideouts	North America	April – May 2014
The Allstars Tour	I See Stars, The Acacia Strain, Like Moths to Flames, Slaves, Structures, Mutrix, Betraying the Martyrs, Palisades, Sworn In, Upon This Dawning, and more	North America	July – August 2014
The Present, Future, Past Tour	We Came as Romans, For Today, The Color Morale, Palisades	North America	September – October 2014
The Not Your American Idols Tour	For All Those Sleeping, Capture the Crown, Ice Nine Kills, Palisades, Myka Relocate, Youth in Revolt	North America	October – November 2014
The Win-tour	For the Fallen Dreams, Palisades, Cane Hill	North America	December 2014
The Mind Games Release Tour	Palisades, For All I Am, Youth in Revolt, Aspire	North America	January 2015
Our Last Night World Tour	Palisades, Our Last Night	Europe	May 2015
Warped Tour 2015	August Burns Red, Blessthefall, Crossfaith, Hundredth, Knuckle Puck, Palisades, Simple Plan, This Wild Life and more	North America	June – August 2015
Younger Dreams Tour	Palisades, Our Last Night, Crooks	Europe	October – November 2015

== Notes ==
1.As Marilyn is Dead.
