= The Dying Things We Live For =

Studio album by Like Moths to Flames
- Released: October 23, 2015
- Studio: Graphic Nature Audio, Belleville, New Jersey, U.S.
- Genre: Metalcore; post-hardcore
- Length: 32:04
- Label: Rise
- Producer: Will Putney; Tom Smith Jr.

Like Moths to Flames chronology
An Eye for an Eye (2013)	The Dying Things We Live For (2015)	Dark Divine (2017)

Singles from The Dying Things We Live For
- 1. "Thrown to the Wind" Released: September 9, 2015; 2. "Fighting Fire with Fire" Released: October 8, 2015; 3. "Wither" Released: December 10, 2015

The Dying Things We Live For is the third studio album by American metalcore band Like Moths to Flames. It was released worldwide on October 23, 2015, through Rise Records and was produced by Will Putney and Tom Smith Jr. It is the band's second album to feature drummer Greg Diamond, their first not to feature an official rhythm guitarist, due to the departure of Zach Huston prior to the recording of the album, and their last to feature guitarist Eli Ford. Towards the end of 2015, and following the album's completion, he was replaced by guitarist Jeremy Smith, formerly of the band City Lights.

== Background and recording ==
Lead vocalist Chris Roetter, on the songwriting process for the album, said that the band's approach to songwriting has "definitely changed but I think the root of why people like the band is definitely still there. I think one of the most important things about writing and aging as a band is showing growth and progression and a bit of variety in a sense. So we kind of took [our first two albums] and did like a trial and error. We took what songs worked and tried to implement those ideas into songs on the new album. I think for people who have liked the band in the past, it will give them an opportunity to see the band in a new light. The focal points on the new album are a little bit different than the past. I think most times the songwriting gives me freedom to do a lot more with the vocals. This time around, there was a lot more focal point on the guitar work and the musicianship behind the lyrics and the vocal patterns and everything. I think for us, it was important to do that because we'd never really had a chance to show what we're all capable of. For me, it was a challenge because the music it wasn't just a base foundation. It was there and there were intricate parts that I had to write around. I think overall, it shows growth."

On the first track from the album, "Thrown to the Wind", Chris Roetter has stated that the track "is a great introduction to the record. [it is] A quick aggressive track that showcases what we were trying to accomplish with the new album without giving away too much [about the album]."

The album's cover artwork, release date and track listing were announced on September 3, 2015.

== Critical reception ==
Professional ratings
Review scores
Source	Rating
CaliberTV	7.6/10
Dead Press!	8/10
New Noise	2/5 stars
New Transcendence	9/10

The Dying Things We Live For received mixed reviews upon release. Zach Redrup from Dead Press! rated the album positively calling it: "Essentially, Like Moths To Flames aren't here to bring you music to make you think over how metalcore can be. They're sticking to what they know and what they're good at, and The Dying Things We Love For definitely lets us see them at their strongest yet. If you're after a game changer, you're looking in the wrong place. But, if you're looking for how today's metalcore should be done, there are very few bands out there that can do it quite as well as Like Moths To Flames. Whether this is justified or they remain as underrated as they have been to date, only time will tell." New Noise Magazine awarded the album a score of 2 stars out of 5, stating in their scathing review that "Like Moths To Flames' latest record, The Dying Things We Live For, is just another sonic equivalent of a Jackson Pollock painting. I'm sure there are some people who will be pleased by the utter chaos and sporadic nature of the sound splattered throughout this album, but I am not one of them. In fact, The Dying Things We Live For may be the perfect title for this record as a large part of the vocals do tend to sound like a small mammal dying a slow and agonizing death."

A positive review of the album from New Transcendence concluded that "Like Moths to Flames continue to live up to their gargantuan reputation. The Dying Things We Live For is every bit as heavy as An Eye for an Eye, yet as catchy as When We Don't Exist, all the while omitting superfluous fluff—giving even listeners on their deathbed a reason to keep living and keep listening." The review also described the album as being "free of filler from start to finish, the entire release is a metalcore powerhouse laden with just enough catchiness and ambience to keep the listener breathing throughout its duration. With every track giving the listener a reason to listen and each breakdown hitting like a tidal wave, the only fault found within the ten-track release's limits is production that seems intentionally rough around the edges." However, the reviewer was slightly critical of the album's production quality, stating that "while a majority of the album's grooves and riffs still [sound] crisp and clear, much of the percussion and bass throughout the release feels unnecessarily crunchy and rough, giving an abrasive feel that the band may or may not have been going for. Ultimately, this pitfall passes by largely unnoticed, as it only truly catches the listener's attention during rare portions of the otherwise captivating release."

== Track listing ==
All lyrics are written by Like Moths to Flames; all music is composed by Like Moths to Flames.

No.	Title	Length
1.	"No King"	3:33
2.	"Thrown to the Wind"	2:40
3.	"The Art of Losing"	3:23
4.	"Fighting Fire with Fire"	3:16
5.	"Never Repent"	3:24
6.	"The Give and Take"	3:16
7.	"History Repeats"	2:55
8.	"Wasted Days"	3:08
9.	"Destined for Dirt"	2:59
10.	"Wither"	3:25
Total length:		32:04

Deluxe Edition Reissue
No.	Title	Length
11.	"Bury Your Pain"	3:42
12.	"What's Done Is Done"	3:53
Total length:		40:07

== Personnel ==
Credits adapted from AllMusic.

Like Moths to Flames

- Chris Roetter – lead vocals
- Eli Ford – guitars
- Aaron Evans – bass, backing vocals
- Greg Diamond – drums, percussion

Additional personnel

- Will Putney – production, mixing, mastering
- Tom Smith Jr. – production, engineering
- Steve Seid – editing
- Bryan Vastano – booking
- Marco Walzel – booking
- Sean Heydorn – A&R
- Aaron Marsh – layout
