= Palisades (album) =

Studio album by Palisades
- Released: January 20, 2017
- Genre: Electronicore
- Length: 39:19
- Label: Rise
- Producer: Brandon Paddock

Palisades chronology
| Mind Games (2015) | Palisades (2017) | Erase the Pain (2018) |

Singles from Palisades
- 1. "Fall" Released: February 22, 2016; 2. "Aggression" Released: October 19, 2016; 3. "Through Hell" Released: December 14, 2016

Professional ratings
Review scores
| Source | Rating |
|---|---|
| New Noise Magazine | 3.5/5 stars |

Palisades is the third studio album by American post-hardcore band Palisades. The album was released on January 20, 2017, by Rise Records. In the US, it peaked at number 3 on the Heatseekers chart, number 18 on the Hard Rock Albums chart, and number 12 on the Independent Albums chart.

== Track listing ==
All tracks are written by Palisades, except "Better Chemicals", "Dark", and "Dancing with Demons", written by Palisades and Matt Wentworth.

Palisades track listing
| No. | Title | Length |
|---|---|---|
| 1. | "Aggression" | 3:33 |
| 2. | "Cold Heart (Warm Blood)" | 3:05 |
| 3. | "Better Chemicals" | 3:06 |
| 4. | "Fall" | 3:51 |
| 5. | "Let Down" | 3:37 |
| 6. | "Dark" | 3:21 |
| 7. | "Through Hell" | 4:36 |
| 8. | "Memories" | 3:51 |
| 9. | "Hard Feelings" | 3:47 |
| 10. | "Dancing with Demons" | 3:10 |
| 11. | "Personal" | 3:21 |
| Total length: | | 39:19 |

== Personnel ==
Palisades

- Louis Miceli – lead vocals, unclean vocals
- Xavier Adames – lead guitar, backing vocals
- Matthew Marshall – rhythm guitar
- Brandon Elgar – bass guitar, backing vocals, co-lead vocals
- Aaron Rosa – drums, percussion
- Christian "DJ" Graves" Mochizuki – turntables, sampling, keyboards, synthesizers, programming, additional production (1, 4-6)

Production

- Brandon Paddock – producer, engineer, mixing

== Charts ==
Chart performance for Palisades
| Chart (2015) | Peak position |
|---|---|
| US Top Hard Rock Albums (Billboard) | 18 |
| US Heatseekers Albums (Billboard) | 3 |
| US Independent Albums (Billboard) | 12 |
