= When We Don't Exist =

Studio album by Like Moths to Flames
- Released: November 8, 2011
- Genres: Metalcore; post-hardcore
- Length: 35:46; 42:25 (Reissue)
- Labels: Rise; Nuclear Blast
- Producer: Will Putney

Like Moths to Flames chronology
| Sweet Talker (2010) | When We Don't Exist (2011) | An Eye for an Eye (2013) |

Singles from When We Don't Exist
- 1. "You Won't Be Missed" Released: November 17, 2011; 2. "GNF" Released: February 21, 2012; 3. "The Worst in Me" Released: June 25, 2012; 4. "Learn Your Place" Released: October 10, 2012

Deluxe Reissue album cover
- Artwork used for the Deluxe Reissue album cover.

When We Don't Exist is the debut studio album by American metalcore band Like Moths to Flames. The album was released on November 8, 2011, through Rise Records and was produced by Will Putney. It is the band's first and only release with drummer Lance Greenfield, who left the band in 2012. It is also the last release with another drummer Kevin Rutherford, who performed on two bonus tracks of the deluxe reissue of the album. The album is also the band's first release with lead guitarist Eli Ford. As of 2012, music videos were produced for the songs "You Won't Be Missed", and "The Worst in Me", as well as a live video for "GNF". A reissue of the album was released on November 20, 2012, featuring two new songs.

== Critical reception ==
Professional ratings
Review scores
| Source | Rating |
|---|---|
| AbsolutePunk | 49% |
| Dead Press! | 7/10 |
| KillYourStereo | 30/100 |
| New Transcendence | 4/5 stars |

The album received mostly positive reviews, but also mixed reviews from several critics. Zach Redrup from Dead Press! rated the album positively calling it: "For someone who is somewhat sceptical about the majority of metalcore that makes its way out of America these days, I would say that this is fairly good. It definitely packs all the better elements of the genre into a neat bundle that even your grandmother can get on with. It's well executed, a bit plain, but generally far from boring. Even if metalcore isn't your game you should give this a go. Who knows? You might be like me and discover a new band that you actually quite like." KillYourStereo gave the album 30 out of 100 and said: "Like Moths To Flames have offered up a completely generic sounding record without a single attempt at originality, which these days, is just simply unacceptable." New Transcendence gave the album a score 4/5 and saying: "The bottom line about this album is: If you thought you liked the band or even KNEW you liked the band when you first heard them, you will LOVE them now. The high-energy, aggressive in your face band they were in the beginning is completely revamped and recharged on this album. It explodes with fury and yet is melodic enough to tempt a good bit of previously unlikely listeners. Definitely give this album a listen! Check out When We Don't Exist out now on Rise Records and prepare your ears for one hell of a treat!"

== Track listing ==
| No. | Title | Length |
|---|---|---|
| 1. | "The Worst in Me" | 4:14 |
| 2. | "GNF" (featuring Danny Leal of Upon a Burning Body) | 2:56 |
| 3. | "No Hope" | 3:10 |
| 4. | "You Won't Be Missed" | 3:11 |
| 5. | "Faithless Living" | 3:16 |
| 6. | "Your Existence" (re-recorded version; original version from Sweet Talker) | 3:03 |
| 7. | "Trophy Child" | 2:28 |
| 8. | "My Own Grave" | 3:13 |
| 9. | "Something to Live For" | 3:37 |
| 10. | "Real Talk" (re-recorded version; original version from Sweet Talker) | 3:19 |
| 11. | "Praise Feeder" | 3:19 |
| Total length: | | 35:46 |

Deluxe Edition Reissue
| No. | Title | Length |
|---|---|---|
| 1. | "Learn Your Place" (bonus track) | 3:24 |
| 2. | "Shapeshifter" (bonus track) | 3:05 |
| 3. | "The Worst in Me" | 4:14 |
| 4. | "GNF" (featuring Danny Leal of Upon a Burning Body) | 2:57 |
| 5. | "No Hope" | 3:10 |
| 6. | "You Won't Be Missed" | 3:11 |
| 7. | "Faithless Living" | 3:15 |
| 8. | "Your Existence" (re-recorded version; original version from Sweet Talker) | 3:03 |
| 9. | "Trophy Child" | 2:28 |
| 10. | "My Own Grave" | 3:13 |
| 11. | "Something to Live For" | 3:37 |
| 12. | "Real Talk" (re-recorded version; original version from Sweet Talker) | 3:21 |
| 13. | "Praise Feeder" | 3:19 |
| Total length: | | 42:25 |

== Personnel ==
Credits adapted from AllMusic.

Like Moths to Flames

- Chris Roetter – lead vocals
- Eli Ford – lead guitar
- Zach Huston – rhythm guitar
- Aaron Evans – bass, backing vocals
- Lance Greenfield – drums, percussion
- Kevin Rutherford – drums, percussion (on tracks 1 & 2 of the deluxe reissue)

Additional musicians

- Danny Leal of Upon a Burning Body – guest vocals on track "GNF"

Additional personnel

- Will Putney – production, engineering, mixing, mastering, composition
- Charlie Busacca – engineering
- Alberto de Icaza – editing
- Jay Sakong – editing
- Jason Malhoyt – management
- Mike Mowery – management
- JJ Cassiere – booking
- Craig Ericson – A&R
- Daniel Wagner – art direction, design, photography
