= I'm Not Dying Today =

I'm not Dying Today

EP by Palisades
- Released: February 7, 2012
- Genre: Post-hardcore, electronicore
- Length: 17:02
- Label: Rise Records
- Producer: Cameron Mizell

Palisades chronology
I'm not Dying Today (2012)	Outcasts (2013)

I'm Not Dying Today is the first EP by American electronicore band Palisades. The EP was released on February 7, 2012.

== Track listing ==
No.	Title	Length
1.	"Disclosure" (featuring Tyler Smith of The Word Alive)	4:06
2.	"Bury It"	3:22
3.	"Immortal"	3:45
4.	"Seamless Ending"	4:01
5.	"Wolves"	3:48
Total length:		17:02

== Personnel ==
Palisades

- Louis Miceli – lead vocals
- Xavier Adames – lead guitar, backing vocals
- Matthew Marshall – rhythm guitar
- Earl Halasan – turntables, synthesizer, lead/rhythm guitar
- Brandon Sidney – bass guitar, vocals
- Aaron Rosa – drums, percussion

== Other personnel ==
- Tyler Smith (The Word Alive) – vocals on "Disclosure"
