= An Eye for an Eye (Like Moths to Flames album) =

Studio album by Like Moths to Flames
- Released: July 9, 2013
- Recorded: March–April 2013
- Studio: The Machine Shop Recording Studio, Belleville, New Jersey, U.S.
- Genre: Metalcore; post-hardcore
- Length: 39:03
- Label: Rise
- Producer: Will Putney

Like Moths to Flames chronology
When We Don't Exist (2011)	An Eye for an Eye (2013)	The Dying Things We Live For (2015)

Singles from An Eye for an Eye
- 1. "The Blackout" Released: June 6, 2013; 2. "I Solemnly Swear" Released: June 10, 2013

An Eye for an Eye is the second studio album by American metalcore band Like Moths to Flames. The album was released on July 9, 2013, through Rise Records and was produced by Will Putney. It's the first album to feature drummer Greg Diamond and the last to feature guitarist Zach Huston.

== Critical reception ==
Professional ratings
Review scores
Source	Rating
Already Heard	3.5/5 stars
Alternative Press	3.5/5 stars
Dead Press!	7/10
KillYourStereo	30/100
Louder Sound	1.5/5 stars
Rock Sound	7/10
Under The Gun	7/10 stars

The album received mostly positive reviews, but also mixed reviews from several critics. Already Heard rated the album 3.5 out of 5 and stated: "Like Moths to Flames are the kind of band you'd probably never pay to see, but would really get into if they were a support band and you'd had a few beers. An Eye for an Eye is the same, it won't change your life but you'll enjoy it while it's playing. It's worth a look, but don't rush out to grab it." Zach Redrup from Dead Press! rated the album positively calling it: "An Eye For An Eye still very much presents things that have already been done by a plethora of bands before time and time again. However, this time around, LMTF have expanded their already preset boundaries and have introduced much more melody and towering hooks that, though present on previous releases were far harder to find and latch onto."

KillYourStereo gave the album 30 out of 100 and said: "Most people probably wouldn't notice if you switched An Eye For An Eye with Like Moths To Flames debut. Generic metalcore at its best." Louder Sound gave the album a slightly negative review and stated: "Like Moths To Flames would be well advised to take a moment to quietly consider the purpose of their existence, because, while there is nothing inherently wrong with An Eye For An Eye, this is an album so derivative, so predictable and so one-dimensional that you have to wonder if they have any self-awareness at all." Rock Sound gave it 7 out of 10 and said: "While we might be a tad spoilt for choice in the metalcore market as of late, Like Moths To Flames' second full-length certainly puts them above the general chasing pack. [...] An Eye for an Eye is a cut above, but on the next album, evolution is key."

== Track listing ==
No.	Title	Length
1.	"You'll Burn"	3:14
2.	"A Feast for Crows"	3:21
3.	"The Common Misconception"	3:31
4.	"I Solemnly Swear"	3:16
5.	"Deathmarks"	3:11
6.	"The Blackout"	3:44
7.	"In Dreams"	3:07
8.	"Into the Ground" (featuring Shane Told of Silverstein)	3:10
9.	"Serpent Herders"	2:15
10.	"Nothing But Blood"	3:32
11.	"Lord of Bones" (featuring Ahren Stringer of The Amity Affliction)	3:27
12.	"My Own Personal Hell"	3:11
Total length:		39:03

== Personnel ==
Credits adapted from AllMusic.

Like Moths to Flames

- Chris Roetter – lead vocals
- Eli Ford – lead guitar
- Zach Huston – rhythm guitar
- Aaron Evans – bass, backing vocals
- Greg Diamond – drums, percussion

Additional musicians

- Shane Told of Silverstein – guest vocals on track "Into the Ground"
- Ahren Stringer of The Amity Affliction – guest vocals on track "Lord of Bones"

Additional personnel

- Will Putney – production, engineering, mixing, mastering, composition
- Zakk Cervini – engineering
- Andy Gomoll – editing
- Mike Mowery – management
- JJ Cassiere – booking
- Marco Walzel – booking
