= Like Moths to Flames =

American metalcore band

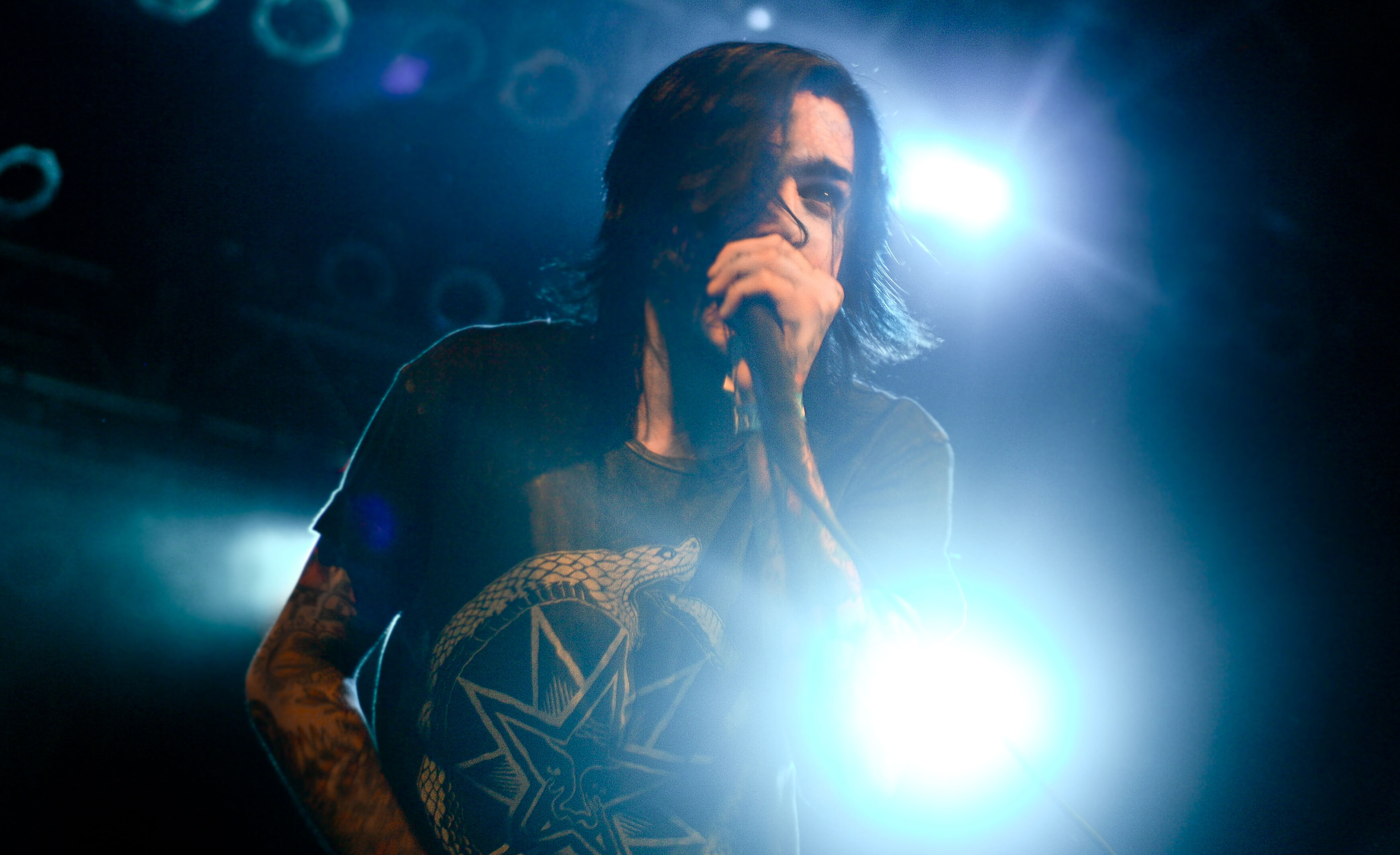
- Chris Roetter performing live in 2012

Background information
- Origin: Columbus, Ohio, U.S.
- Genres: Metalcore; post-hardcore
- Years active: 2010–present
- Labels: Rise; Nuclear Blast; UNFD
- Members: Chris Roetter; Zach Pishney; Roman Garcia; Cody Cavanaugh
- Past members: Jordan Matz; Aaron Douglas; Lance Greenfield; Kevin Rutherford; Zach Huston; Eli Ford; Greg Diamond; Jeremy Smith; Aaron Evans
- Website: Like Moths to Flames on Facebook

Like Moths to Flames is an American metalcore band from Columbus, Ohio, formed in 2010 by former members of various bands, including Emarosa, Agraceful, the Crimson Armada, TerraFirma, and My Ticket Home. The band has released six studio albums and five EPs. The band's current line-up consists of lead vocalist Chris Roetter, guitarists Zach Pishney and Cody Cavanaugh, and drummer Roman Garcia. Roetter is the only member of the original line-up that remains in the band.

== History ==
=== Formation and Sweet Talker (2010) ===
The band was formed in early 2010. Vocalist Chris Roetter, having sung for the bands Agraceful and Emarosa beforehand, formed Like Moths to Flames with four of the six members of Ohio metalcore band TerraFirma: Aaron Evans (who joined playing rhythm guitar before later moving to bass); Zach Huston (lead guitar); Aaron Douglas (bass); and Jordan Matz (drums). The band released their debut single titled "Dead Routine" on February 7, 2010. Prior to the release of debut EP Sweet Talker, they would release two more demos, "Avada Kedavra" and "Death Eaters". Death Eaters featured Michael Guilford of Legion, a deathcore band from the same area.

On October 17, 2010, it was announced that Like Moths to Flames had been signed to Rise Records and were already working on their first EP. Two months later, the band released their EP titled Sweet Talker on December 14, 2010. To help support their new music, the band set out with fellow acts Texas in July and A Hero A Fake on the "A Metal Christmas" tour through late 2010. Sometime before their EP was released, drummer Jordan Matz left Like Moths to Flames, and was replaced by Lance Greenfield.

=== When We Don't Exist and line-up changes (2011–2012) ===
With continuous touring through 2011, the band decided to settle back down and head into the studio to record their first full-length studio album. Right before the band headed to the studio, bassist Aaron Douglas parted ways with the band. The band had Eli Ford (formerly of My Ticket Home) join on guitar and Aaron Evans moved to bass. When We Don't Exist was released on November 8 through Rise Records. In January 2012, the band headed out on the S.I.N. Tour with acts D.R.U.G.S., Hit the Lights and Sparks the Rescue to support the album. Soon after, they toured with bands Texas in July and Hundredth.

=== An Eye for an Eye (2013–2014) ===
The band then spent the first half of 2013 headlining the Rise Records tour around the US with supporting acts Crown the Empire, the Color Morale, Palisades and My Ticket Home. The band recorded their second full-length album with Will Putney at (The Machine Shop) in Hoboken, New Jersey and was released July 9, 2013. On May 29, 2013, the band confirmed the new album was called An Eye for an Eye. The album debuted at number 63 on the Billboard 200 top sales. They toured with the Vans Warped Tour over the summer of 2013 on the Monster Energy Stage. Shortly after the All Stars Tour 2014, guitarist Zach Huston decided to part ways with the band citing that he wants to pursue other interests. It wasn't until late in 2015 that he was replaced by guitarist Jeremy Smith, formerly of City Lights.

=== The Dream Is Dead and The Dying Things We Live For (2015–2016) ===
In a Q&A interview with Stheart, Chris Roetter announced the band has been writing new music and intends to release it "soon". On Monday, April 6, the band released a standalone release on 7" Vinyl called The Dream Is Dead, featuring two tracks - the A-side being "Bury Your Pain" and the B-side being "What's Done Is Done".

The band's third full-length album, The Dying Things We Live For, was announced on September 3, 2015, confirming its release date to be October 23, 2015. Upon release, the album debuted at number 150 on the Billboard 200. Three singles from the album have been released thus far, with music videos accompanying two of the songs - "Fighting Fire with Fire", and "Wither".

=== Dark Divine and Where the Light Refuses to Go (2017–2019) ===
On September 27, 2017, the band released a single "Nowhere Left to Sink". They announced that the associated album, Dark Divine, would be released on November 3, 2017. The music video for "Nowhere Left to Sink" was released exclusively to AltPress on September 27. They released the second single and title track, "Dark Divine" through Loudwire on October 7. The third single, "Empty the Same" was released on October 14. The fourth single, "Shallow Truths for Shallow Minds" was released on October 21 via Tattoo.com. The final and fifth single, "From the Dust Returned" was released on October 28.

On November 16, 2018, the band released Dark Divine Reimagined, a short EP which saw the band record and release some tracks from their Dark Divine record in an acoustic and stripped down format. In May 2019, vocalist Chris Roetter confirmed that the band had parted ways with Rise Records, the label who they had been with since their inception and through which they've released all of their albums and EPs to date. He also confirmed that they had already written and recorded several tracks towards what may be their fifth album. On September 17, the band announced that they signed with UNFD and released a new single "All That You Lost". On October 15, the band released another single titled "Smoke and Mirrors". On November 13, the band released a new EP titled Where the Light Refuses to Go.

=== No Eternity in Gold and Pure Like Porcelain (2020–2023) ===
On August 5, 2020, the band teased on their Twitter account that a single titled "Habitual Decline" would be released on August 11. On that day, the band officially released the single along with its music video. At the same time, the band officially announced No Eternity in Gold, which was released on October 30, 2020. On September 9, the band released the second single "YOTM". On October 7, the band released the third single "Selective Sacrifice" alongside an accompanying music video. On October 27, three days before the album release, the band released the fourth and final single from the album, "Killing What's Underneath".

On October 5, 2021, the band announced a five-track EP, entitled Pure Like Porcelain. The EP, set for release on November 5, 2021, features brand new tracks primarily lifted from a wellspring of new material the band have compiled in recent years, with guitarist Zach Pishney referring to it as just a 'small taste' of what is to come. On October 28, one week before the EP release, the band released the second and final single from the EP, "Views from Halfway Down". On January 25, 2023, the band fired founding member Aaron Evans due to the history of alleged abuses with text messages, ranging from multiple secret relationships to manipulation and gaslighting. On March 30, the band released a brand new single "Predestination Paradox". On May 4, the band unveiled another single "I Found the Dark Side of Heaven".

=== The Cycles of Trying to Cope (2024–present) ===
On February 7, 2024, the band released two new singles "Paradigm Trigger" and "Angels Weep" with a corresponding music video for "Paradigm Trigger". On March 7, the band unveiled the third single "Kintsugi" along with a music video. At the same time, they announced that their upcoming sixth studio album, The Cycles of Trying to Cope, would be released on May 10, 2024, while also revealing the album cover and the track list. On April 11, the band premiered the fourth single "Dissociative Being". On October 3, the band released the song “Soul Exchange” on streaming services after it was a hidden track on physical releases for the album.

== Band members ==
Current

- Chris Roetter – lead vocals (2010–present)
- Zach Pishney – lead guitar (2021–present), rhythm guitar (2016–2021), backing vocals (2016–present)
- Roman Garcia – drums, percussion (2021–present)
- Cody Cavanaugh – rhythm guitar (2023–present)

Former

- Jordan Matz – drums, percussion (2010)
- Aaron Douglas – bass, backing vocals (2010–2011)
- Lance Greenfield – drums, percussion (2010–2012)
- Kevin Rutherford – drums, percussion (2012)
- Zach Huston – rhythm guitar (2011–2014), lead guitar (2010–2011)
- Eli Ford – lead guitar (2011–2015)
- Greg Diamond – drums, percussion (2012–2019)
- Jeremy Smith – lead guitar (2015–2021)
- Aaron Evans – bass (2011–2023), backing vocals (2010–2023), rhythm guitar (2010–2011)

== Discography ==
Studio albums

- When We Don't Exist (2011)
- An Eye for an Eye (2013)
- The Dying Things We Live For (2015)
- Dark Divine (2017)
- No Eternity in Gold (2020)
- The Cycles of Trying to Cope (2024)

EPs

- Sweet Talker (2010)
- The Dream Is Dead (2015)
- Dark Divine Reimagined (2018)
- Where the Light Refuses to Go (2019)
- Pure Like Porcelain (2021)
- Does Heaven Ever Mourn for Me (2026)

Other songs

- "Avada Kedavra" and "Death Eaters" (featuring Michael Guilford of Legion) – 2010 demo songs prior to their first EP
- "Some Nights" (Fun cover) – from Punk Goes Pop 5 compilation
- "Basilisk" and "Inherit the Tragedy" – B-sides from No Eternity in Gold
- "Predestination Paradox" and "I Found the Dark Side of Heaven" – 2023 non-album singles

=== Videography ===
| Song | Year | Album | Type | Link |
|---|---|---|---|---|
| "Your Existence" | 2011 | Sweet Talker | Performance | |
| "You Won't Be Missed" | 2011 | When We Don't Exist | Performance | |
| "GNF" | 2012 | When We Don't Exist | Live performance | |
| "The Worst in Me" | 2012 | When We Don't Exist | Performance | |
| "Learn Your Place" | 2013 | When We Don't Exist (Deluxe Reissue) | Performance | |
| "I Solemnly Swear" | 2013 | An Eye for an Eye | Performance | |
| "Fighting Fire with Fire" | 2015 | The Dying Things We Live For | Performance | |
| "Wither" | 2015 | The Dying Things We Live For | Narrative | |
| "Nowhere Left to Sink" | 2017 | Dark Divine | Narrative | |
| "Empty the Same" | 2018 | Dark Divine | Performance | |
| "All That You Lost" | 2019 | Where the Light Refuses to Go | Narrative | |
| "Habitual Decline" | 2020 | No Eternity in Gold | Performance | |
| "Selective Sacrifice" | 2020 | No Eternity in Gold | Performance | |
| "Paradigm Trigger" | 2024 | The Cycles of Trying to Cope | Narrative | |
| "Kintsugi" | 2024 | The Cycles of Trying to Cope | Performance | |
| "Soul Exchange" | 2024 | The Cycles of Trying to Cope | Narrative | |
| "Over the Garden Wall" | 2024 | The Cycles of Trying to Cope | Narrative | |

=== Collaborations ===
| Year | Song | Album | Artist | Link |
|---|---|---|---|---|
| 2007 | "Close Your Eyes, It's Okay to Rest Now" (featuring Chris Roetter) | Before Their Eyes | Before Their Eyes | |
| 2008 | "The Man in the White Suit" (featuring Chris Roetter) | The Vision and Reality | Tonight Is Glory | |
| 2010 | "Clots" (featuring Chris Roetter) | Wife Beater | The Plot in You | |
| 2013 | "The Reckoning" (featuring Chris Roetter) | Outcasts | Palisades | |
| 2014 | "Loose Ends" (featuring Chris Roetter) | Maybe This Place Is the Same and We're Just Changing | Real Friends | |
| 2014 | "The Untitled" (featuring Chris Roetter) | War of Aggression | Assassins | |
| 2016 | "Downcast" (featuring Chris Roetter) | These Roads Lead Nowhere | Far From Over | |
| 2018 | "The Storm Will Pass" (featuring Chris Roetter) | Hope for the Broken | Convictions | |
