= The Color Morale =

American metalcore band

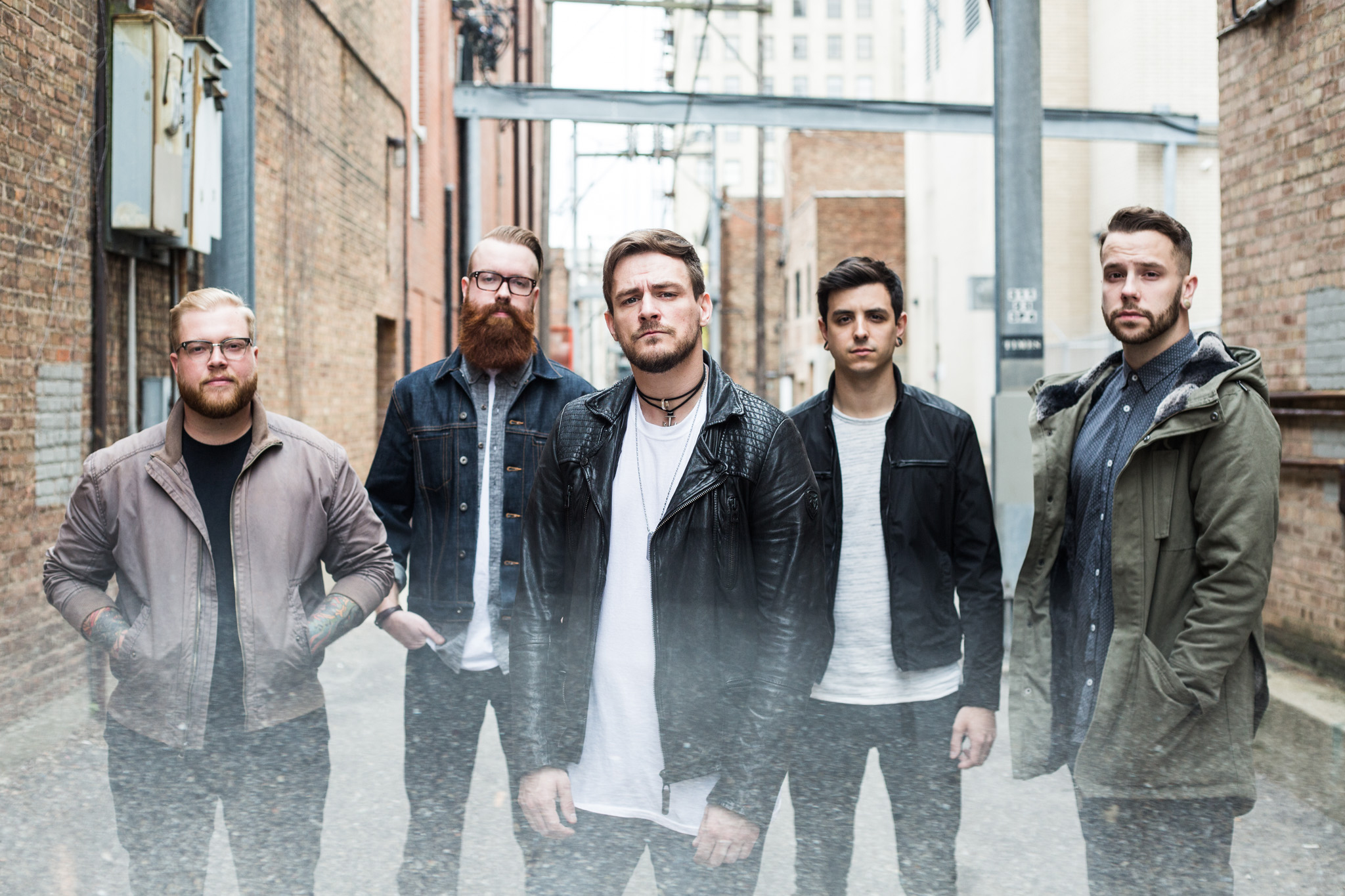
- The Color Morale in 2016. From left to right: Honson, King, Rapp, Carey, Saunders

Background information
- Also known as: The Killer Apathy
- Origin: Rockford, Illinois, U.S.
- Genres: Metalcore; post-hardcore
- Years active: 2007–2018; 2020–present
- Labels: Fearless; Rise
- Members: Garret Rapp; Steve Carey; Devin King; Aaron Saunders; Mike Honson
- Past members: John Bross; Ramon Mendoza; Ryan Pulice; Justin Hieser

The Color Morale is an American metalcore band from Rockford, Illinois, formed in 2007. The band includes vocalist/keyboardist Garret Rapp, guitarists Devin King and Aaron Saunders, bassist Mike Honson, and drummer Steve Carey. Rapp and Carey are the only two members of the original lineup that remain in the band. The group was signed to Fearless Records before they went into a hiatus in 2018. The band officially returned in March 2020. Before the hiatus, the band released five studio albums: We All Have Demons, My Devil in Your Eyes, Know Hope, Hold On Pain Ends, and Desolate Divine.

The band's sound is influenced by a variety of post-hardcore and metalcore bands such as Glassjaw, Beloved, Misery Signals and Poison the Well. Major themes in the group's music included religion, mental disorders, overcoming past struggles, and a message of positivity.

== History ==
=== Formation and We All Have Demons (2007–2010) ===
The band was formed in 2007 by Garret Rapp, Justin Hieser, Ramon Mendoza, John Bross and Steve Carey after their previous bands broke up. All of them, excluding Justin Hieser, were in a band called The Killer Apathy, with Bross on bass and Garret performing clean vocals and guitar. They explained that their name "was a title that says what the band's mission statement is and states what the band does." On June 9, 2009, the band was signed to Rise Records with an expected release on September 1, 2009 for their debut studio album. The band's debut studio album, titled We All Have Demons was recorded at Foundation Studios in Connersville, Indiana with producer Joey Sturgis. In 2010, they set out on the Rise Records Tour with The Bled and also came out with a music video for the song "Humannequin" off the album.

=== My Devil in Your Eyes and lineup changes (2010–2012) ===
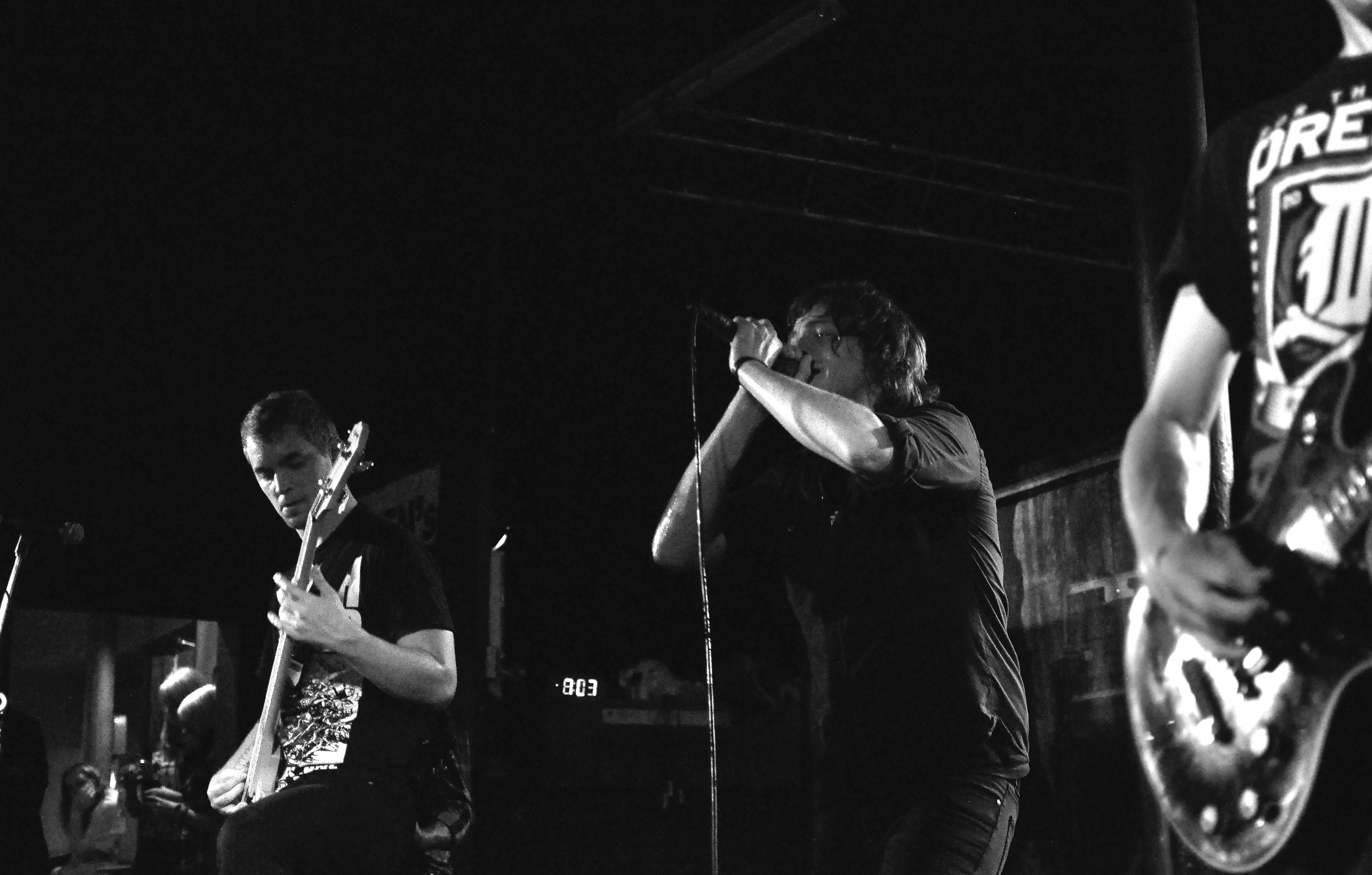
The Color Morale live in 2011.

In late 2010, the band began writing their upcoming second studio album and headed into the studio once again, with Joey Sturgis resuming position as producer. The band's second studio album titled My Devil in Your Eyes was released on March 8, 2011. Shortly before the release, bassist Justin Hieser left the band for personal reasons. Shortly after his leaving, the band recruited a replacement Anthony Wick to take over duties as bassist. While on tour, Hieser reunited with the band and Wick stepped down as bassist. Then, shortly after leaving for the "Scream It Like You Mean It 2011 Tour", guitarist John Bross left the band due to getting engaged and wanting to settle down to start a family, as well as focusing on his clothing line. Hieser took over duties as rhythm guitarist, and bass was tracked during live performances. During the 2012 Fire & Ice tour, they recruited bassist Ryan Pulice, former member of the band Rosaline, to take over bass duties. In August 2012, it was quietly announced that lead guitarist Ramon Mendoza would be taking up a reduced role within the band in order to care for his newborn child. Former touring member and merchandise manager Devin King was confirmed as his replacement.

=== Know Hope (2012–2014) ===
By mid-2012, the band were in the process of writing their third studio album, believed to be entitled Know Hope, and originally expecting a 2012 or 2013 release. The band wrote twenty-two songs, twelve of which were finalized into the album. Josh Schroeder produced, engineered, mixed, and mastered the record from October to December 2012.

Aaron Saunders became the new rhythm guitarist, replacing founding rhythm guitarist John Bross. Bassist Ryan Pulice was also kicked from the band in favor of Justin Hieser desiring to switch his position from guitar to playing bass. On January 31, 2013, the band released a lyric video for the song "Learned Behavior" through Alternative Press and also revealing their album artwork, track listing, and release date of March 26. On March 20, 2013, Rise Records released the album on YouTube.

On January 1, 2014, it was announced that the band would be playing in the 2014 Vans Warped Tour.

=== Signing to Fearless Records and Hold On Pain Ends (2014–2016) ===
On April 10, 2014, it was revealed by Fearless Records that they have signed The Color Morale, and they also announced that the band's label debut and fourth studio album, titled Hold On Pain Ends, will be out later in 2014. On April 11, the band announced Mike Honson as their new official bassist via Facebook, replacing Justin Hieser. On May 27, the band announced that they completed recording their album after two months. On June 23, the first single, "Outer Demons", from their upcoming album was released on iTunes, along with a promotional lyric video.

On July 2, the album artwork and track list for the album was made public with accompanying pre-orders. On July 16, the band released their second single "Suicide;Stigma" which features guest vocals Dave Stephens of We Came as Romans.

Hold On Pain Ends was officially released on September 2, 2014. The album was produced by Mike Green. Beside of Dave Stephens, it also features guest vocals from Craig Owens of Chiodos on the track "Developing Negative".

=== Desolate Divine and hiatus (2016–2020) ===
On June 23, 2016, the band released the name of their fifth studio album, Desolate Divine. It was released on August 19. On the same day, the band released the lead single "Walls". Rapp did not provide the unclean vocals on the album; they were instead done by rhythm guitarist Aaron Saunders.

On January 19, 2018, Garret Rapp announced on the band's Facebook page that the band are taking a break and officially went into a hiatus.

=== Return and upcoming sixth studio album (2020–present) ===
On March 25, 2020, Garret Rapp announced that the band was back and writing for their upcoming sixth studio album. On January 30, 2023, the band announced they would reunite at Blue Ridge Rock Festival 2023 held at the Virginia International Raceway in September.

== Christianity ==
The Color Morale have generally expressed that they are not a Christian band. In an interview, bassist Anthony Wick said this on the issue: "Most of us are Christians. I think the label 'Christian Band' is more related to marketing and sales than it does an actual belief in something. You see so much of this 'We're a Christian band, this and that' sort of thing, and you just don't know what people are like outside of that setting. You can be Christian as you want to be on stage, but off-stage, it's a whole different ball game with people. I think before you say anything like that, I think you need to live your life according to what you believe, or you're just a hypocrite and it doesn't matter what you say on stage. I wouldn't label us a Christian band, but we're guys that believe in Jesus, and that's our beliefs — but we like to talk about it in a different sense, different from the idea of 'Evangelical Christian Metalcore'."

In March 2013, vocalist Garret Rapp was interviewed in which he mentions the following: "I think I was in 2011 during Scream It Like You Mean It Tour. I think in the last year in my life I've really taken a step back. I can feel it when I talk...I'm in a grey area right now, I'm unsure of where I am and where I'm going, it's feel like I'm walking with quicksand beneath me half the time, it's a very unstable time of life right now. I'm just trying to do the best thing I can with what I've got given to me or I've came to do what I've tried to earn I guess...I'm just trying to do something positive for someone else, and that re-affirms a purpose in me for something right now."

== Band members ==
Current

- Garret Rapp – lead vocals, keyboards (2007–2018, 2020–present)
- Steve Carey – drums (2007–2018, 2020–present)
- Devin King – lead guitar (2012–2018, 2020–present)
- Aaron Saunders – rhythm guitar (2012–2018, 2020–present); vocals (2013–2018, 2020–present); backing vocals (2012–2013)
- Mike Honson – bass, backing vocals (2013–2018, 2020–present)

Former

- John Bross – rhythm guitar, backing vocals (2007–2011)
- Ramon Mendoza – lead guitar (2007–2012)
- Ryan Pulice – bass (2011–2012)
- Justin Hieser – bass (2007–2011, 2012–2013); vocals (2007–2013); rhythm guitar (2011–2012)

Touring

- Anthony Wick – bass (2011)
- Ricky Thomas – bass (2013)

Timeline

== Discography ==
=== Studio albums ===
Year	Title	Label	Chart positions			
Year	Title	Label	Top 200	US Heat	US Christian	US Indie
2009	We All Have Demons	Rise	–	–	–	–
2011	My Devil in Your Eyes	Rise	–	11	20	44
2013	Know Hope	Rise	106	1	–	22
2014	Hold On Pain Ends	Fearless	28	–	–	6
2016	Desolate Divine	Fearless	155	–	–	–

=== Music videos ===
Year	Song	Album	Director	Type	Link
2010	"Humannequin"	We All Have Demons	Unknown	Narrative	
2013	"Smoke and Mirrors"	Know Hope	Unknown	Live performance	
2013	"Learned Behavior"	Know Hope	Dan Kennedy & Rasa Acharya	Performance	
2013	"Strange Comfort"	Know Hope	Dan Kennedy & Rasa Acharya	Narrative	
2013	"Steadfast"	Know Hope	Brendan Donahue	Live performance	
2014	"Prey for Me"	Hold On Pain Ends	Dan Centrone	Narrative	
2014	"Between You and Eye"	Hold On Pain Ends	Eric Richter	Performance	
2016	"Walls"	Desolate Divine	Samuel Halleen	Narrative	
2016	"Clip Paper Wings"	Desolate Divine	The Color Morale	Live performance	

=== Collaborations ===
Year	Song	Album	Artist
2011	"Whiteflag" (featuring Garret Rapp)	Broken Mirrors	Mercy Screams
2012	"Inertia (The Hermit)" (featuring Garret Rapp)	Divination	In Hearts Wake
2012	"Holy Smokin O's" (featuring Garret Rapp)	The Call Out	Boys of Fall
2013	"Fractures" (featuring Garret Rapp)	The Greatest of These	Sinners to Saints
2013	"Man of the House" (featuring Garret Rapp)	Pandoras Box	Our Imbalance
2013	"The Loyal Ones" (featuring Garret Rapp)	Beacon	Witness
2013	"Persona Ex Machina" (featuring Garret Rapp)	Indigo on Blast	Indigo on Blast
2013	"Scarred" (featuring Garret Rapp)	Non-album single	Oh, Infamous City
2013	"Elevate" (featuring Garret Rapp)	Elevate	Silence Is Broken
2014	"Empty Eyes" (featuring Garret Rapp)	Rebel Revive	Jamie's Elsewhere
2014	"Voodoo Blues" (featuring Garret Rapp)	I Have Become a Corpse	Illuminate Me
2014	"Dream Eater" (featuring Garret Rapp)	Heavy Hearts	For the Fallen Dreams
2014	"Season of the Dead" (featuring Garret Rapp)	Season of the Dead	Chasing Safety
2015	"The Oil, the Canvas" (featuring Garret Rapp)	Honesty	Abyss, Watching Me
2015	"People Like Us" (featuring Garret Rapp)	Mind Games	Palisades
2015	"DreamWeaver" (featuring Garret Rapp)	DreamWeaver	Made from Myths
2015	"Soulless" (featuring Garret Rapp)	Sounds of Sorrow	DEADSPEAKER
2015	"The Hearts of Our Broken" (featuring Garret Rapp)	Routine Breathing	Slaves
2015	"Dead Society" (featuring Garret Rapp)	Dead Society	We Were Giants
2016	"Stepping Stones" (featuring Garret Rapp)	Past Is Prologue	A Greater Danger
2018	"Delectation" (featuring Garret Rapp)	Reverie	Boy Becomes Hero
2021	"Let's Pretend" (featuring Garret Rapp)	Galleons	Galleons
