= Jeremy Camp discography =

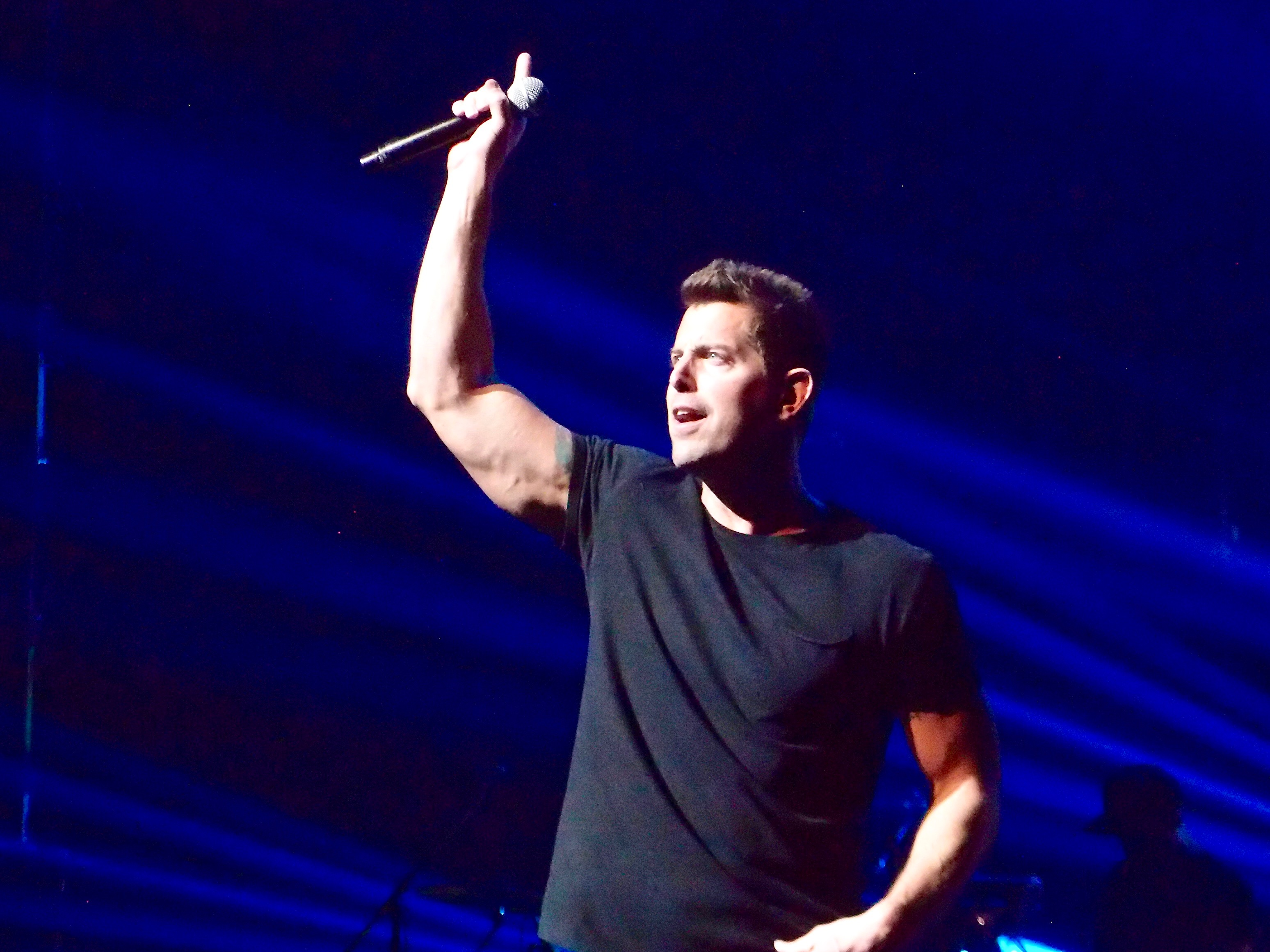
- Studio albums: 14
- EPs: 1
- Live albums: 2
- Compilation albums: 1
- Singles: 36
- Music videos: 8
- Other album appearances: 33

The discography of Christian recording artist Jeremy Camp consists of 14 studio albums, 1 extended play (EPs), 33 other appearances, and 36 singles.

== Albums ==
=== Studio albums ===
Title	Details	Peak chart positions			Sales	Certifications
Title	Details	US	US Christ	US Rock	Sales	Certifications
Burden Me	Released: November 17, 2000; Label: Independent	—	—	—		
Stay	Released: September 24, 2002; Label: BEC Recordings	— (Note: Stay did not enter the Billboard 200, but peaked at No. 13 on the Billboard Top Heatseekers)	10	—		RIAA: Gold
Carried Me	Released: February 10, 2004; Label: BEC	102	2	—		RIAA: Gold
Restored	Released: November 16, 2004; Label: BEC	45	1	17		RIAA: Gold
Beyond Measure	Released: October 31, 2006; Label: BEC	29	1	12		RIAA: Gold
Speaking Louder Than Before	Released: November 25, 2008; Label: BEC	38	1	10		
We Cry Out	Released: August 24, 2010; Label: BEC	15	1	—		RIAA: Gold
Christmas: God With Us	Released: September 25, 2012; Label: BEC	119	27	—		
Reckless	Released: February 12, 2013; Label: BEC	31	1	10	US: 22,000	
I Will Follow	Released: February 3, 2015; Label: Stolen Pride Records/Sparrow Records/Capitol CMG	25	1	—	US: 41,200	
The Answer	Released: October 6, 2017; Label: Sparrow/Capitol CMG	33	2	—		
The Story's Not Over	Released: September 20, 2019; Label: Sparrow/Capitol CMG	39	1	—		
The Worship Project (with Adrienne Camp)	Released: September 4, 2020; Label: Sparrow	—	21	—		
When You Speak	Released: September 10, 2021; Label: Stolen Pride/Sparrow/Capitol CMG	—	2	—		
Deeper Waters	Released: May 17, 2024; Label: Stolen Pride/Sparrow/Capitol CMG	— (Note: Deeper Waters did not enter the Billboard 200, but peaked at No. 34 on the BIllboard Top Album Sales)	2	—		
Revival	Released: February 5, 2027; Label: Capitol CMG	To be released				
"—" denotes a recording that did not chart or was not released in that territory.

== Live albums ==
Title	Details	Peak chart positions		Certification
Title	Details	US	US Christ	Certification
Live Unplugged	Released: November 8, 2005; Label: BEC	111	7	RIAA: 2× Platinum
Jeremy Camp Live	Released: November 17, 2009; Label: BEC	—	22	
"—" denotes a recording that did not chart or was not released in that territory.

== Compilation albums ==
Title	Details	Peak chart positions		Certifications
Title	Details	US	US Christ	Certifications
I Still Believe: The Number Ones Collection	Released: 2012; Label: BEC	— (Note: I Still Believe: The Number Ones Colelction did not enter the Billboard 200, but peaked at No. 198 on the Top Current Album Sales chart)	21	
I Still Believe: The Greatest Hits	Released: February 7, 2020; Label: Sparrow/Capitol CMG	— (Note: I Still Believe: The Greatest Hits did not enter the Billboard 200, but peaked at No. 94 on the Top Album Sales chart)	3	
"—" denotes a recording that did not chart or was not released in that territory.

== Other releases ==
=== Heart of the Artist ===
Heart of the Artist was a six-track bonus disc given out with the pre-order of Carried Me.

=== Live Session EP ===
Live Session EP is an iTunes-exclusive release.

== Singles ==
Title	Year	Peak chart positions					Certifications	Album
Title	Year	US	US Christ	US Christ Air	US Christ AC	US Rock	Certifications	Album
"Right Here"	2002	—	9		10	—		Stay
"I Still Believe"	2002	—	5		6	—	RIAA: Gold	Stay
"Walk By Faith"	2002	—	1		1	—	RIAA: Gold	Stay
"Beautiful One"	2004	—	—		—	—		Carried Me
"Empty Me"	2004	—	—		—	—		Carried Me
"Take You Back"	2004	—	1		1	—		Restored
"Lay Down My Pride"	2005	—	—		—	—		Restored
"This Man"	2006	—	1		1	—		Restored
"Understand"	2006	—	—		—	—		Live Unplugged
"Stay"	2006	—	—		—	—		Live Unplugged
"My Desire"	2006	—	—		—	—		Live Unplugged
"Let Everything That Has Beath"	2006	—	—		—	—		Restored: Deluxe Gold Edition
"Tonight"	2006	—	4		—	—		Beyond Measure
"Give You Glory"	2007	—	4		1	—		Beyond Measure
"Let It Fade"	2007	—	1		1	—		Beyond Measure
"We Remember"	2008	—	—		—	—		Beyond Measure
"There Will Be a Day"	2008	—	1		1	—	RIAA: Platinum	Speaking Louder Than Before
"Speaking Louder Than Before"	2009	—	16		10	—		Speaking Louder Than Before
"Healing Hand of God"	2009	—	6		5	—		Speaking Louder Than Before
"Jesus Saves"	2010	—	2		3	—		We Cry Out
"The Way"	2011	— (Note: "The Way" did not enter the Billboard Hot 100, but peaked at No. 16 on the Billboard Bubbling Under Hot 100)	1		1	—		We Cry Out
"Overcome"	2012	—	2		2	—	RIAA: Gold	We Cry Out
"Reckless"	2012	—	14		9	—		Reckless
"My God"	2013	—	5		8	—		Reckless
"Come Alive"	2014	—	17	13	21	—		Reckless
"Hope Can Change Everything" (with Francesca Battistelli, Jamie Grace, Matt Maher, Bart Millard, and Sidewalk Prophets)	2014	—	14	21	—	—		Non-album single
"He Knows"	2014	—	4	1	1	—	RIAA: Gold	I Will Follow
"Same Power"	2015	—	6	1	3	—	RIAA: Gold	I Will Follow
"Christ in Me"	2016	—	6	1	2	—	RIAA: Gold	I Will Follow
"Word of Life"	2017	—	8	3	3	—		The Answer
"The Answer"	2018	—	22	17	24	—		The Answer
"My Defender"	2018	—	6	1	2	—		The Answer
"Dead Man Walking"	2019	—	7	2	2	—	RIAA: Gold	The Story's Not Over
"Keep Me in the Moment"	2020	—	5	1	1	—	RIAA: Gold	The Story's Not Over
"Out of My Hands"	2020	—	7	1	1	—		The Story's Not Over
"When You Speak"	2021	—	10	4	5	—		When You Speak
"Getting Started"	2022	—	3	1	1	—		When You Speak
"Anxious Heart"	2023	—	16	8	7	—		When You Speak
"These Days"	2024	—	4	2	2	—		Deeper Waters
"Ready Now" (with Lecrae)	2024	—	—	—	—	—		Deeper Waters: Deluxe edition
"Again" (solo or with Arie and Bella Camp)	2025	—	18	3	4	—		Deeper Waters
"No Survivors" (original or with Skillet)	2025	—	12	4	1	34		Deeper Waters
"Go On and Tell It"	2025	—	—	—	—	—		Non-album single
"Reflector"	2026	—	—	—	—	—		Revival
"Revival"	2026	—	10	6	4	—		Revival
"—" denotes a recording that did not chart or was not released in that territory.

== Promotional singles ==
Title	Year	Peak chart positions	Album
Title	Year	US Christ	Album
"Living Word"	2014	29	I Will Follow
"Storm"	2017	—	The Answer
"Never Stopped Loving"	2017	—	The Answer
"Still Alive"	2019	—	The Story's Not Over
"Father"	2019	—	The Story's Not Over
"Cant Take Away"	2021	41	When You Speak
"One Desire"	2021	—	When You Speak
"Shaky Ground"	2026	—	Revival
"—" denotes a recording that did not chart or was not released in that territory.

== Other charted songs ==
List of other charted songs with selected chart positions
Title	Year	Peak chart positions		Album
Title	Year	US Christ	US Christ. Air	Album
"Only You Can"	2019	45	—	The Story's Not Over
"I Still Believe" (2020 version)	2020	34	45	I Still Believe: The Greatest Hits
"—" denotes a recording that did not chart or was not released in that territory.

== Compilation appearances ==
Year	Song title	Album title	Notes
2002	"Understand"	Festival Con Dios 2002, Vol. 2	
2003	"Take My Life"	X 2003	
2003	"I Still Believe"	WOW Hits 2004	
2004	"Stay"	X 2004	
2004	"Walk by Faith"	BEC Music	
2004	"Here I Am to Worship"	Empty Me, Vol. 1	
2004	"Empty Me"	Empty Me, Vol. 1	
2004	"How Great Is Your Love"	Maranatha Friends	
2004	"Right Here"	WOW Hits 2005	
2005	"Lay Down My Pride"	X 2005	
2005	"I Wait For The Lord"	X Worship 2006	
2005	"Take You Back"	WOW Hits 2006	
2005	"Open Up Your Eyes"	Music Inspired by The Chronicles of Narnia: The Lion, the Witch and the Wardrobe	
2006	"Breathe"	X 2006	
2006	"This Man"	WOW Hits 2007	
2007	"Tonight"	X 2007	
2007	"Empty Me"	Worship Together: Favorites	
2007	"It Is Well"	Amazing Grace: Music Inspired By the Motion Picture	performed with Adie
2007	"Right Here"	Music from and Inspired By Bridge to Terabithia	
2007	"What It Means"	WOW Hits 2008	
2008	"Give You Glory"	WOW Hits 1	
2008	"Let It Fade"	WOW Hits 2009	
2009	"There Will Be a Day"	WOW Hits 2010	
2010	"Healing Hand of God"	WOW Hits 2011	
2011	"Move In Me (Paul)"	Music Inspired by The Story	
2011	"Jesus Saves"	WOW Hits 2012	
2012	"Overcome"	WOW Hits 2013	
2013	"My God"	WOW Hits 2014	
2014	"Come Alive"	WOW Hits 2015	
2015	"He Knows"	WOW Hits 2016	
2016	"Same Power"	WOW Hits 2017	
2017	"Word of Life"	WOW Hits 2018	
2018	"The Answer"	WOW Hits 2019 (Deluxe Edition)	
2020	"Walk By Faith (2020 Version)"	I Still Believe: Original Motion Picture Soundtrack	
2020	"I Still Believe (2020 Version)"	I Still Believe: Original Motion Picture Soundtrack	
