= Bill Madden (musician) =

American singer-songwriter

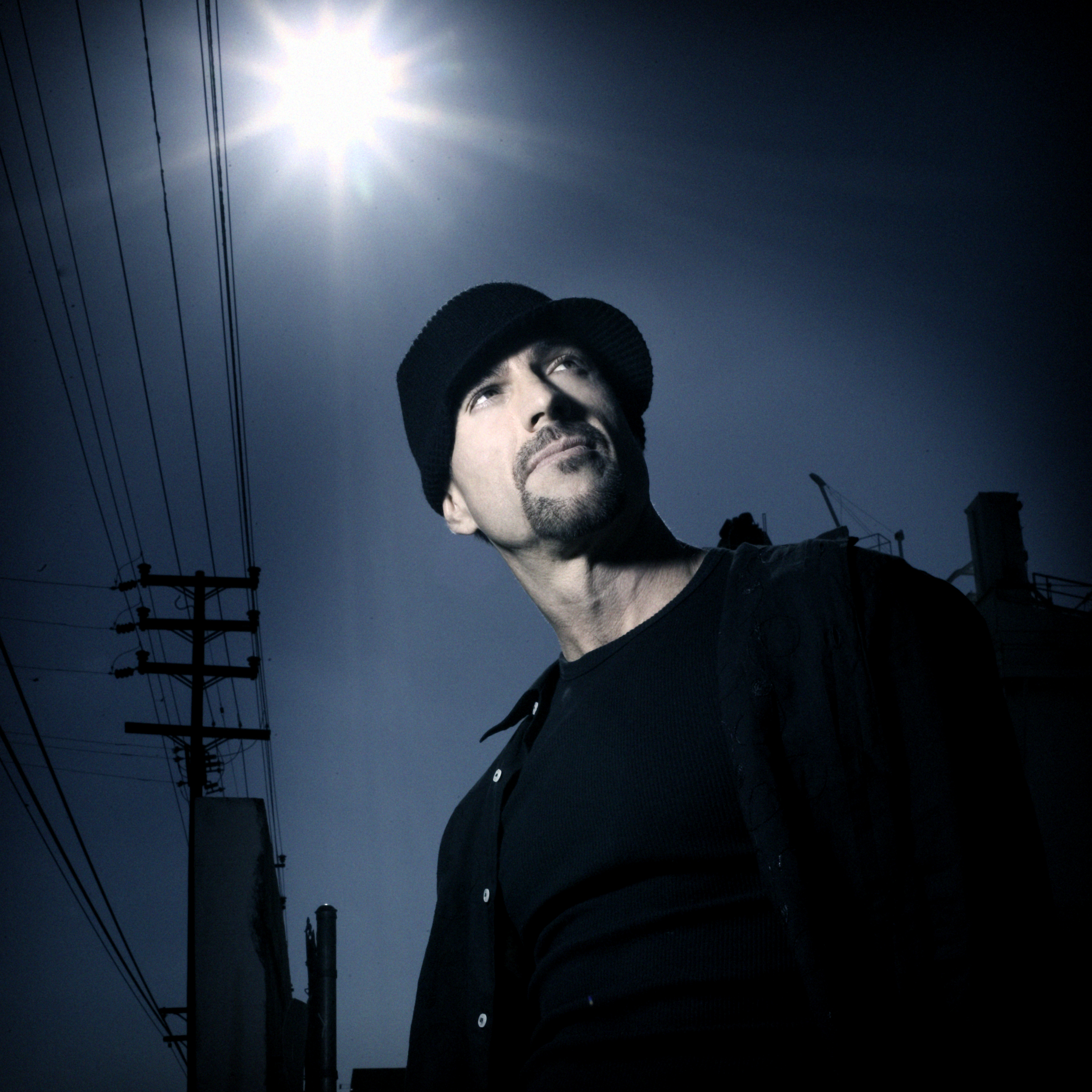
- Bill Madden

Background information
- Origin: Costa Mesa, California, United States
- Genres: Singer-songwriter, folk rock, indie rock
- Instruments: Vocals, guitar, piano
- Years active: 1995–present
- Label: MADMUSE
- Website: www.billmadden.com

Bill Madden is an American singer-songwriter, also regarded as an indie musician and an activist. Madden is best known for his environmental song and music video Gone which was in rotation on television networks, MTVU in America and MuchMusic in Canada. As a short film and music video, Gone also won multiple film festival awards and commendations. Madden's music is typically labeled as alternative folk rock or neofolk. Vocally, Madden's voice has been described as a "deep breathy voice [that] serenades listeners," full of range, melodic, and "reminiscent of Jeff Buckley." In his lyrics he often uses metaphor, verse and poetry, to articulate his socio/political and spiritual themes.

== Musical Career: Original Indie ==
Madden was originally signed by Paul Atkinson, former guitarist for The Zombies. When RCA shelved Madden's project, Madden co-founded MADMUSE and released Chillin' In Hades in 1995, Samsara's Grip in 2004, Gone in 2006, and Child of the Same God in 2008.

In September 2014, Bill Madden released his fifth studio album, which was recorded with long-time partner, multi-instrumentalist/producer Billy Mohler. The album cover and insert features the artwork of Mexican artista plástico Héctor Falcón.

== Activism and Environmentalism ==
Some of Madden's frequent and recurring themes in his music include the quest for spiritual fulfillment, inequity between the wealthy and shrinking middle class, a plea for ethics and accountability of politicians and business leaders for the welfare of the global community as a whole, and calls against the damage being done to the environment. Madden writes in a song titled What in the World from his 2006 album Gone: "I see the human cost / Lives ruined, jobs lost." In the title track Gone, Madden is tough on politicians and writes: "Mother Earth's a mess from pollution and war."

Madden also expresses anger towards the harm caused by guns and violence in community. From the album Chillin’ In Hades, in Here And Now, which debuted on MTV's Real World Boston (Episode #20), Madden sings about the 1992 Los Angeles riots in the aftermath of the Rodney King verdict.

Another recurring theme of Madden's is poverty and materialism. In Here And Now from the album Chillin' In Hades, Madden sings "hungry people need jobs and shelter." In Reconcile, which debuted on MTV's Real World Boston (Episode #14). In 2004, Madden was among the minority of musicians who challenged President George W. Bush. Madden spoke out in opposition to the Bush administration's invasion of Iraq in print and on the 2004 album Samsara's Grip in Om Tat Sat, Consequence of War, and World Just Is. Wim Boluijt of Real Roots Café writes "Madden ... placed his finger on the world's most vulnerable spot when, in Dangerous Game from Gone (2006) he asked: 'How many barrels of / Blood does it take / To fill an SUV / These days'."

On the title track of his 2014 album New Religion, Madden rails against unfettered capitalism and greed, telling a story about a family having everything taken away from them: "The white shirts / Arrived today uninvited / Without any shame / They took everything... / Money, more money, more money, more / Hail to the kings of malfeasance... / God is greed, meet the new religion."

In a 2014 interview, Madden spoke out for the need of more women in leadership roles in the world, "… when it comes to inequality, historically, no group of people have been discriminated against more than women. Men have been fucking up the world for thousands of years. It's time we give more women a chance to lead."

In 1995, Madden launched the progressive news website activist360 which curates news stories, opinion pieces, periodicals, and research with a focus on current and breaking news dedicated to environmental issues, and climate change.

== Philosophy ==
Madden's music is influenced by Eastern Philosophy, the teachings of Krishnamurti, and existentialism. Shrink The Guru, from the album Samsara's Grip, reflects a Madden struggling with his thoughts. As noted by Justin Kownacki of Splendid Magazine, "The inherent paradox in Madden's work, and in Eastern philosophy in general, is summed up in World Just Is."

Madden's poetic influences include poet Dylan Thomas: Right in the Head, from the album Samsara's Grip, was based on the poem Love in the Asylum; Friend, from the album Gone, was inspired by the poem To Others Than You.

== Discography ==
=== Albums ===
- Chillin' In Hades (1995, MADMUSE)
- Samsara's Grip (2004, MADMUSE)
- Gone (2006, MADMUSE)
- Child of the Same God (2008, MADMUSE)
- New Religion (2014, MADMUSE)

=== Video ===
- Gone (2006, MADMUSE)
- Unfair (2008, MADMUSE)
- Francesca (2014, MADMUSE)

== Contributing Musicians ==
- Drew Hester: Percussionist for the Foo Fighters; co-producer of Taylor Hawkins and the Coattail Riders; and drummer for Eagles guitarist Joe Walsh.
- Billy Mohler: Bassist and multi-instrumentalist for The Jimmy Chamberlin Complex; Mohler co-produced Life Begins Again; former member of The Calling; bassist on Liz Phair album Somebody's Miracle.
- Jack Sherman: Guitarist on the albums: Red Hot Chili Peppers The Red Hot Chili Peppers, Bob Dylan Knocked Out Loaded, and Peter Case The Man with the Blue Post-Modern Fragmented Neo-Traditionalist Guitar.
- Cameron Stone: Cellist on the albums: Tracy Chapman New Beginning and Collection, Ann Danielewski, also known as Poe, Hello; Anna Nalick Wreck of the Day, Lana Lane Secrets of Astrology (Think Tank), and Jeremy Camp Restored (Deluxe Gold Edition).
- Adam Watts: Drummer, solo artist and producer; Watts co-produced three Jeremy Camp albums: Stay, Carried Me, and Restored.
- Jimmy Chamberlin: Drummer for The Smashing Pumpkins and The Jimmy Chamberlin Complex.
- Gannin Arnold: Guitarist for The Jimmy Chamberlin Complex and Taylor Hawkins and the Coattail Riders.
- Sean Woolstenhulme: Guitarist for The Jimmy Chamberlin Complex and former member of The Calling.
- Jonathan Dresel: Drummer for Cleto and the Cletones, "house band" of Jimmy Kimmel Live!
- Charlie Paxson: Drummer for James Blunt, Colin Hay, Smash Mouth, Liz Phair, Belinda Carlisle, Rickie Lee Jones, Mylene Farmer, Kyosuke Himuro, Eikichi Yazawa.
