= I Still Believe (film) =

2020 American Christian romantic drama film

- Theatrical release poster
- Directed by: Erwin brothers
- Screenplay by: Jon Erwin; Jon Gunn; Madeline Carroll
- Based on: I Still Believe by Jeremy Camp and Phil Newman
- Produced by: Kevin Downes; Jon Erwin; Andrew Erwin
- Starring: KJ Apa; Britt Robertson; Melissa Roxburgh; Nathan Parsons; Shania Twain; Gary Sinise
- Cinematography: Kristopher Kimlin
- Edited by: Parker Adams; Ben Smallbone
- Music by: John Debney
- Production companies: Kingdom Story Company; Kevin Downes Productions; Erwin Brothers Entertainment
- Distributed by: Lionsgate
- Release dates: March 7, 2020 (ArcLight Hollywood); March 13, 2020 (United States)
- Running time: 116 minutes
- Country: United States
- Language: English
- Budget: $12 million
- Box office: $16.7 million

I Still Believe is a 2020 American biographical Christian romantic drama film directed by the Erwin brothers and starring KJ Apa, Britt Robertson, Shania Twain, Melissa Roxburgh, and Gary Sinise. It is based on the life of American contemporary Christian music singer-songwriter Jeremy Camp and his first wife, Melissa Lynn Henning-Camp, who was diagnosed with ovarian cancer shortly before they married. Camp's song "I Still Believe" is the film's namesake.

The film is the first production by Kingdom Story Company, the Erwin Brothers' fifth feature film, and their second to be released under the Lionsgate banner. It premiered at ArcLight Hollywood on March 7, 2020, and was theatrically released in the United States on March 13, 2020. It received mixed reviews from critics, who commended the film for depicting faith in the midst of suffering, but criticized the plot and characters. Lionsgate released the film to video on demand on March 27, 2020, due to the COVID-19 pandemic.

== Plot ==
In Lafayette, Indiana, in September 1999, Jeremy Camp departs for Calvary Chapel College in Murrieta, California. The night of his arrival, he goes to a concert of Canadian Christian band, the Kry, where he meets the lead singer, Jean-Luc LaJoie, who becomes fast friends with Jeremy, who turns to him for musical advice.

After the concert, Jeremy meets Melissa Henning, a fellow student at his school, and friend of Jean-Luc, who loves Melissa, but she does not feel the same. Jeremy and Melissa get to know each other, and quickly begin dating, causing a rift among the three. As a result, Melissa ends her relationship with Jeremy.

Jeremy goes back to his family's home in Indiana for Christmas break. A few days after Christmas, he receives a phone call from Jean-Luc, saying that Melissa is sick, and asks Jeremy to come back to California.

Upon his arrival, Jeremy visits Melissa in the hospital, who tells him that she has been diagnosed with Stage 3C ovarian cancer spread to her liver after an orange-sized tumor was removed from her stomach. She also tells Jeremy that she loves him. He says the same, proposes and Melissa accepts.

During this time, Jeremy begins to make a name for himself as a Christian singer-songwriter. At one point, when Melissa is about to have an MRI. Melissa learns that the cancer has spread to her ovaries, so she needs a hysterectomy. She wakes up to Jeremy after the surgery was supposed to happen, who tells her the surgery was canceled as she is now cancer-free.

Six months later, Jeremy and Melissa marry. Everything seems perfect until after their honeymoon, when she wakes up in pain. Jeremy takes her to the hospital, where they find out her cancer has returned, and that nothing more can be done for her.

As Melissa grows weaker, Jeremy begins to question his faith in God. In the hospital, Jeremy sings a song he wrote ("Walk by Faith") during their honeymoon. Melissa passes shortly after.

Jeremy becomes angry at God, and chooses to abandon his musical career, smashing his guitar until it breaks. Inside the guitar, Jeremy finds a note Melissa left for him to find after her death, telling him that suffering does not damage faith, but strengthens it. Her parting words encourage him to continue writing songs.

Two years later, Jeremy performs a song he wrote after Melissa's death ("I Still Believe") about his suffering, but eventually restored faith. After the concert, he meets a woman named Adrienne, who tells Jeremy that she lost someone close to her, and she was angry at God, and his songs changed her life.

Jeremy promises to share Melissa's story, believing that God will use it to change lives. The credits reveal that Jeremy and Adrienne got married in 2003, and have three children Bella, Arie and Egan.

== Cast ==
- KJ Apa as Jeremy Camp
- Britt Robertson as Melissa Henning-Camp, Jeremy's first wife
  - JJ Heller as Melissa Henning-Camp (singing voice) (uncredited)
- Melissa Roxburgh as Heather Henning, Melissa's younger sister
- Nathan Dean as Jean-Luc Lajoie, lead singer of The Kry and a mutual friend also interested in Melissa
  - David Leonard as Jean-Luc Lajoie (singing voice) (uncredited)
- Abigail Cowen as Adrienne Liesching, Jeremy's second wife
- Shania Twain as Teri Camp, Jeremy's mother
- Gary Sinise as Tom Camp, Jeremy's father
- Cameron Arnett as Dr. Furst
- Anjelah Johnson as Professor Rochester
- Reuben Dodd as Josh Camp, Jeremy's younger brother
- Nicolas Bechtel as Jared Camp, Jeremy's younger brother
- Ed Litton as the Dean of Students

== Production ==
The film is the first project of a deal struck between the Erwin Brothers and Lionsgate after the success of their film I Can Only Imagine in 2018. It is also the first film produced by Kingdom Story Company, a film studio founded by the Erwin Brothers, Kevin Downes, and Tony Young, and the Erwin Brothers' second music biopic after I Can Only Imagine.

Jeremy Camp was actively involved in the production of the film, while singer-songwriter Bart Millard of MercyMe (whose life story was told in the Erwin Brothers' I Can Only Imagine) acted as an executive producer, along with Camp, Jon Gunn, and others.

=== Casting ===
KJ Apa was announced as the star of the film, playing Camp, and Gary Sinise was announced for the role of Camp's father, at CinemaCon in April 2019. That same month it was announced that Britt Robertson would co-star as Melissa Camp, joined by Shania Twain as Camp's mother, Melissa Roxburgh as Melissa's sister, and Nathan Parsons as Jean-Luc Lajoie, lead singer for the band The Kry, a mutual friend.

Apa, who did his own singing for the film, said he was drawn to the story because "[t]heir love is seriously put to the test in this movie," adding, "it's about journeying through your biggest fears and disappointments and coming out still believing. I believe that anyone, everyone can relate to this film because it's a story about love, loss, and hope." Apa later related that his role in I Still Believe is "the coolest thing I've ever done".

Co-director Andrew Erwin related that he hoped the cast, particularly Apa and Robertson, would attract non-Christians in addition to a Christian audience.

=== Music ===
Composer John Debney was hired to write the score for the film, while KJ Apa sang his own renditions of several songs written by Jeremy Camp during the period of his life recounted in the film, including "I Still Believe", "Walk by Faith", and "This Man". I Still Believe is John Debney's third time composing the score for a Christian film, after The Passion of the Christ in 2004 and The Young Messiah in 2016.

=== Writing ===
Jon Erwin, Jon Gunn, and Madeline Carroll (who starred in I Can Only Imagine) wrote the screenplay for I Still Believe.

=== Filming ===
Filming began in the Mobile, Alabama, area in May 2019, where it was filmed entirely.

The film's cinematographer, Kristopher Kimlin, had collaborated with the Erwin Brothers on their past productions, Moms' Night Out, Woodlawn, and I Can Only Imagine.

== Theme ==
Regarding the film's main theme, Jeremy Camp, on whose life the film is based, said that it "tells my story and shares what God has done amidst all the hard things I went through. It shows hope in the midst of pain."

The film's stars, Apa, Robertson and Twain, also shared their thoughts on the film's themes, with Twain commenting that "[t]his is [about] a love that goes beyond fear, that goes beyond any doubt[.]" Apa said that

it's [about] journeying through your biggest fear and coming out on the other side and still loving God ... I hope people, after seeing the love between Jeremy and Melissa, think, 'I hope that I could one day be in love like that[.]

I Still Believe's co-director, Jon Erwin, said in an interview with the Baptist Press that

[the] film grapples with [the question of why God allows suffering.] ... I think we forget so many times that there is a beauty, and a purpose, and a meaning in the difficult things we go through. And that sometimes God uses those things more than He uses the good things that happen to shape us, to mold us and to give us our voice. ... It's a love story as God intended, between these two people and God, and between these two people and each other[.]

== Soundtrack ==
I Still Believe: Original Motion Picture Soundtrack

Soundtrack album by John Debney, Jeremy Camp, David Leonard, and JJ Heller
- Released: March 6, 2020
- Genre: Soundtrack
- Length: 57:32
- Label: Capitol

John Debney film scores chronology
Dora and the Lost City of Gold (2019)	I Still Believe: Original Motion Picture Soundtrack (2020)	Clifford the Big Red Dog (2021)

The original motion picture soundtrack was released digitally by Capitol Records on March 6, 2020, and included Debney's score, Apa's renditions of Camp's songs "This Man", "I Still Believe", "My Desire", and "Right Here", as well as new versions of "I Still Believe" and "Walk by Faith" performed by Jeremy Camp, and two tracks featuring dialog from the film.

Track listing
No.	Title	Length
1.	"I Still Believe" (performed by KJ Apa; written by Jeremy Camp)	3:42
2.	"Jeremy Says Goodbye" (written by Debney)	4:05
3.	"This Man" (performed by KJ Apa; written by Jeremy Camp)	3:09
4.	"Take My Hand" (performed by David Leonard written by Jean-Luc Lajoie & Yves Lajoie)	4:20
5.	"Find Me in the River" (performed by KJ Apa and JJ Heller)	3:03
6.	"Some Stars Shine Brighter Than Others" (written by Debney)	3:12
7.	"My Desire" (performed by KJ Apa; written by Jeremy Camp)	3:19
8.	"Dwelling Places (Dialog)" (dialog by cast of I Still Believe)	0:59
9.	"Right Here" (performed by KJ Apa; written by Jeremy Camp)	3:29
10.	"Melissa Loves Jeremy" (written by Debney)	2:07
11.	"You Call I'll Answer" (performed by David Leonard)	4:03
12.	"Walk by Faith (Dialog)" (dialog by cast of I Still Believe)	2:35
13.	"Ancient Stories Still Relevant" (written by Debney)	4:44
14.	"Hey, What's Your Name Again?" (written by Debney)	3:21
15.	"Walk by Faith (2020 version)" (written and performed by Jeremy Camp)	3:41
16.	"I Still Believe (2020 version)" (written and performed by Jeremy Camp)	4:31
17.	"I Can't Save Myself (bonus track)" (performed by Adrienne Camp)	3:12
Total length:		57:32

== Release ==
I Still Believe premiered at ArcLight Hollywood in Hollywood, California on March 7, 2020, and was released in North American theaters on March 13 by Lionsgate, with early showings on IMAX theaters on March 11. I Still Believe is the first feature-length faith-based film to be released on IMAX screens.

As the COVID-19 pandemic receded, the film was released in three Santikos Theatres locations in San Antonio, Texas, on May 1, 2020.

=== Marketing ===
Christian band MercyMe announced in October 2019 that it would be promoting the film through their winter-spring 20/20 tour with Jeremy Camp as a special guest. In February 2020, Camp wrote and released I Still Believe: A Memoir in promotion of the film. Jeremy and Adrienne Camp and Jon Erwin spoke at Liberty University in early March prior to the film's release to promote I Still Believe.

=== Video on demand ===
Due to movie theaters closures because of the COVID-19 pandemic restrictions, Lionsgate and Kingdom Story Company announced on March 19 that the film would get an early digital Premium VOD release on March 27 in the United States and Canada, just two weeks after the film's theatrical debut and before the end of the usual 90-day theatrical run. Lionsgate chairman Joe Drake said in a statement, "With theaters closed nationwide due to these unprecedented events, we want to continue to make I Still Believe available to consumers... We're enormously proud of the movie that the Erwin Brothers created and are grateful to be able to share it with audiences for their home viewing pleasure." The Erwin brothers added, "As filmmakers, we are heartbroken that we can't share I Still Believe on a big screen the way we intended. We make movies because we love movies and we stand firmly behind the nation's theater chains, from the largest circuits to the smallest mom and pop indies that have been so dramatically affected by these unprecedented closures. But the safety of guests comes first, and we're proud to have the opportunity to share online a movie whose inspiring message of love, hope and faith is perfect for these uncertain times."

== Reception ==
=== Box office ===
I Still Believe grossed $10.4 million in the United States and Canada, and $6.3 million in other territories, for a worldwide total of $16.7 million.

In the United States and Canada, the film was released alongside The Hunt and Bloodshot, and was projected to gross $11–15 million from 3,250 theaters in its opening weekend. The film was number one at the box office on its first day at $4 million, including $780,000 from Wednesday IMAX screenings and Thursday night previews. It went on to debut to just $9.1 million, finishing third behind holdover Onward and Bloodshot. The weekend was also noteworthy for being the lowest combined grossing since October 1998, with all films totaling only $55.3 million, which was attributed to COVID-19 concerns.

=== Critical response ===
On review aggregator website Rotten Tomatoes, I Still Believe holds an approval rating of 50% based on 48 reviews, with an average rating of 5.6/10. The site's critics consensus reads, "I Still Believe's palpable good intentions are offset by its predictable handling of a fact-based story that ends up preaching to the choir." On Metacritic, the film has a weighted average score of 41 out of 100, based on 12 critics, indicating "mixed or average" reviews. Audiences polled by CinemaScore gave the film an average grade of "A" on an A+ to F scale, and PostTrak reported it received an average 4.5 out of 5 stars.

In a favorable review, Pete Hammond of Deadline Hollywood said that "I Still Believe doesn't rewrite any of the rules of this genre, but it does ask the right questions of faith in light of unimaginable tragedy without trying to sugarcoat them. For those who truly want to 'still believe', it should be enough. Fans of Apa also ought to be happy. Cynics should quarantine themselves from this; it's not for you." Megan Basham of World also wrote a positive review for the film, and, while criticizing it for its "melodramatic raging", similarly praised its depiction of faith amidst suffering, saying, "[t]he Erwins are careful to show that God is faithful even when He says 'no.'" Joe Leydon of Variety, in a positive review for the film, praised Apa's and Robertson's performances and commended the Erwin Brothers' direction, saying that in I Still Believe "they amp the emotional power – subtly at first, then gradually more aggressively – with a 'Love Story'-style scenario that is all the more potent for being based on real-life events."

Frank Scheck of The Hollywood Reporter commended the film for dealing with "the difficulty of maintaining faith when tragedy strikes for no apparent reason", although his review was ultimately negative, with him stating as a bottom line that "[t]ears will be jerked, but you'll feel the machinations." Carla Meyer of The San Francisco Chronicle, while praising Robertson's acting and her chemistry with Apa, derided the film for the lack of "any character development for Jeremy beyond caretaker and worried partner." Similarly, IndieWire writer David Ehrlich gave the film a "C−", stating that "[t]he power of the Camps' story is hard to deny, but it would almost be impossible to make it seem more hollow. Maybe if the Erwins depicted people with half the same detail with which they dote upon Jesus, I Still Believe wouldn't feel so insufferably forced to those of us who don't. Similarly, TheWrap contributor Carlos Aguilar, while praising Kristopher Kimlin's cinematography and the "above-average production value", called the film "[s]accharine" and "[f]ormulaic to the core, from the protagonist's short-lived moment of doubt to the epiphany that sets him back on course."

== Awards and nominations ==
Award	Date of ceremony	Category	Result
Dove Award	2020	Inspirational Film of the Year	Won
