= Become Who You Are =

Studio album by Mainstay
- Released: 25 September 2007
- Recorded: Early 2007
- Genre: Rock, Christian rock
- Length: 44:43
- Label: BEC Recordings

Mainstay chronology
Well Meaning Fiction (2006)	Become Who You Are (2007)

Become Who You Are is the second and final studio album released by Christian rock band Mainstay. It was released September 25, 2007.

== Singles ==
"Believe" was the 20th most-played song of 2008 on U.S. Contemporary Christian music radio stations according to R&R magazine's Christian CHR chart.

== Track listing ==
1. "Become Who You Are"
2. "Stars Are Singing"
3. "Away From You"
4. "Where Your Heart Belongs"
5. "Am I Keeping You?"
6. "Believe"
7. "Only One"
8. "Island"
9. "When You Come Down"
10. "Roads"
11. "Story"
12. "Don't I Look The Same"
13. "Hang On"

== Personnel ==
- Justin Anderson – lead vocals, rhythm guitar
- Scott Campbell – lead guitar
- Dan Ostebo - bass guitar
- Ryan DeYounge – drums

== Jeremy Camp ==
Some of the songs of this album and Chris Tomlin's album Arriving were performed by them as the opening act on Jeremy Camp's Live Unplugged Tour
