= Spirit West Coast =

American Christian music festival

- Locations: Mazda Raceway Laguna Seca; Monterey, California Del Mar Fairgrounds; Concord Pavilion
- Years active: 1997-2013 (Monterey); 2004-2012, 2015 (Del Mar); 2014–2019, 2021– (Concord); 2014–2019, 2021– (Ontario)
- Website: spiritwestcoast.org

Spirit West Coast (SWC) is a Christian music festival that features Christian artists from several different genres. It also features lectures, workshops in tents, kids' shows, petting zoos, and comedians.

Spirit West Coast was founded by five families in 1995. It began in 1997 as a yearly festival in Monterey, California. Later, an additional festival in Del Mar, California, was added. These two festivals are held every summer. The festivals are members of the Christian Festival Association.

Many of the most popular Christian acts play concerts for the attendees. These include Michael W. Smith, Audio Adrenaline, Newsboys, Delirious?, Chris Tomlin, Tree63, Jeremy Camp, Armour Under Fire, Rebecca St. James, Skillet, the Kry, Toby Mac, Jars of Clay, Larry Norman and many others.

Some of the top Christian speakers and authors give lectures/sermons at Spirit West Coast festivals. Past speakers include Charles Stanley, Greg Laurie, Luis Palau, Tony Campolo, Frank Peretti, Miles McPherson, Ron Luce, and Louie Giglio. At nights popular Christian comedians like Bob Smiley tell jokes in big tents.

Compassion International is one of the focuses of SWC. Compassion has a tent where they encourage people to sponsor hungry and needy children in other countries. SWC keeps track of the number of sponsorships and announces the growing number over their loudspeaker.

The layout of Spirit West Coast consists of a main stage with large screens for those that have to stand or sit far away. In addition, it features side stages (some inside tents), several merchandise tents, and various other tents (e.g. first aid, lost and found, etc.). There are also numerous food vendors on site.

SWC offers camping to those that do not live nearby and to those that don't want to stay in hotels. Buses run from the campgrounds to the main stage, so people don't have to walk too far. These buses generally run until about midnight.

Many church groups attend Spirit West Coast. They pack their youth groups into buses and drive to Monterey or Del Mar. SWC offers a special rate for groups. One group calling themselves the "Traveling Circus" has made particularly visible appearances at the concert every year, starting large dance pits at performances. The group is made of a dozen or so Christian punks, goths and hippies.

These festivals last between 3–4 days. They start around 9 am and end around midnight each night. People of all faiths (and no faith) can and do attend. There are invitational messages to repent and trust in Jesus, presented both by the event staff and the individual musicians, and there are also baptisms held at the Monterey festival.

Spirit West Coast is run almost entirely by volunteers. Volunteers typically work four- or nine-hour shifts. Some, namely IT, electrical, construction, kitchen crews, operations, navigators, and a few others, work many more hours. For these individuals, SWC is an adventure and family reunion that they look forward to year after year. For these departments, and many others, onsite work often begins a week prior to the festival start date and doesn't end for days after when the last items are packed up and stored for the following year. There is much to be done to convert the Del Mar Fairgrounds into a festival site, and even more to be done to convert the dust bowl of WeatherTech Raceway Laguna Seca.

No festivals were held in 2020.
