= Live Unplugged (Jeremy Camp album) =

Live album by Jeremy Camp
- Released: November 8, 2005
- Venues: W274, Franklin, TN
- Genres: Contemporary Christian music, worship
- Length: 50:55
- Label: BEC

Jeremy Camp chronology
Restored (2004)	Live Unplugged (2005)	Beyond Measure (2006)

Professional ratings
Review scores
Source	Rating
Allmusic	3.5/5 stars
Jesus Freak Hideout	4/5 stars

Live Unplugged is an album by Jeremy Camp.

== Track listing ==
All tracks are written by Jeremy Camp, except where noted.

Album release
No.	Title	Writer(s)	Original studio recording on	Length
1.	"Understand"		Stay	4:32
2.	"Right Here"		Stay	5:16
3.	"Take You Back"		Restored	4:43
4.	"Stay"		Stay	4:52
5.	"Walk By Faith"		Stay	5:18
6.	"Empty Me"	John Mark Comer, Gene Way	Carried Me	4:20
7.	"Restored"		Restored	4:07
8.	"My Desire"		Restored	4:05
9.	"I Still Believe"		Stay	5:04
10.	"Beautiful One"	Tim Hughes	Carried Me	4:02
11.	"This Man"		Restored	7:08
Total length:				53:27

== Mainstay ==
Mainstay was the opening act in many locations of this tour. They played some of their own singles and some songs off of Arriving, an album from Chris Tomlin.

== Accolades ==
In 2007, the album was nominated for a Dove Award, for Long Form Music Video of the Year, at the 38th GMA Dove Awards.

== Personnel ==
- Drums: Leif Skartland
- Bass: Michael Martin
- Guitar: Randy Williams
- Guitar: Jared Camp
- Piano/keys: Justin Glasco
- Strings: The Nashville String Machine; arranged and conducted by Tom Howard
- Background Vocals: Adrienne Camp

=== Production ===
- DVD Director: Carl Diebold
- DVD Producers: Ken Conrad and Michael Sacci of Jupiter Project
- Audio Produced & Mixed by Adam Watts and Andy Dodd for Reddecibleproductions.com
- Executive Producer: Tyson Paoletti
- A&R: Brandon Ebel
- Mastered by Fred Paragano at Paragon Studio
- Photos by Jeremy Cowart
- Lighting/Set Design: Tony Fransen
- Recorded live at W274 in Franklin, TN
- Management: Matt Balm

== Certifications ==
Region	Certification	Certified units/sales
United States (RIAA)	2× Platinum	200,000^{^}
^{‡} Sales+streaming figures based on certification alone.
