= Jeremy Camp Live =

Live album by Jeremy Camp
- Released: November 17, 2009
- Recorded: March 9, 2009
- Venue: Dallas, Texas
- Genre: CCM, pop rock
- Length: 69:04
- Label: BEC

Jeremy Camp chronology
Speaking Louder Than Before (2008)	Jeremy Camp Live (2009)	We Cry Out: The Worship Project (2010)

Jeremy Camp Live is a live album by musician Jeremy Camp, released on November 17, 2009, and recorded on March 9, 2009, in Dallas, Texas during the Rock And Worship Road Show

== Track listing ==
1. Capture Me - 4:53
2. Give You Glory - 3:39
3. Tonight - 3:44
4. This Man - 4:28
5. Walk By Faith - 3:18
6. Hallelujah/You Never Let Go - 4:46
7. Let It Fade - 4:36
8. Talking - 5:25
9. Speaking Louder Than Before - 3:37
10. There Will Be a Day - 5:00
11. Take You Back - 4:20
12. Take My Life - 4:11
13. Lay Down My Pride - 3:45
14. Right Here - 5:50
15. Give Me Jesus - 7:26

Bonus track from playing the safe minigame on his promotional site for the CD.

1. What It Takes (Live from LA) - 3:52
