= Not Ashamed (disambiguation) =

Not Ashamed may refer to:

- I'm Not Ashamed, a 2016 film directed by Brian Baugh
- Not Ashamed, a 1992 album by Newsboys
- "Not Ashamed", a song by Jeremy Camp from the album We Cry Out: The Worship Project
