= Let It Fade =

Single by Jeremy Camp

from the album Beyond Measure
- Released: 2008
- Recorded: 2006
- Length: 3:44
- Label: BEC Recordings
- Songwriters: Jeremy Camp, Adam Watts
- Producers: Jeremy Camp, Adam Watts, & Andy Dodd

Jeremy Camp singles chronology
"Give You Glory" (2008)	"Let It Fade" (2008)	"Believe" (2008)

Music video
- "Let It Fade" on YouTube

"Let It Fade" is a song by contemporary Christian musician Jeremy Camp from his album Beyond Measure. The song was written by Jeremy Camp and Adam Watts and was released as a single in early 2008, and in April it became a No. 1 hit in the U.S. on Christian adult contemporary radio.

== Compilation and live ==
This song was also the compilation album WOW Hits 2009 and the 2009 live version album Jeremy Camp Live.

== Music video ==
The music video for the single "Let It Fade" was released on December 7, 2008. The video features Camp performing the song and a woman looking through old photographs.

== Credits ==
- Jeremy Camp – lead vocals, backing vocals
- Andy Dodd – keyboards, programming, acoustic guitars, electric guitars
- David J. Carpenter – bass
- Adam Watts – drums, additional programming
- Adrienne Camp – additional backing vocals

== Charts ==
=== Weekly charts ===
Chart (2008)	Peak position
US Christian AC (Billboard)	1
US Christian Airplay (Billboard)	1
US Hot Christian Songs (Billboard)	1
US Christian AC Indicator (Billboard)	1
US Christian Soft AC (Billboard)	6

=== Year-end charts ===
Chart (2008)	Peak position
US Christian Songs (Billboard)	4
