= I Will Follow (disambiguation) =

"I Will Follow" is a song by Irish rock band U2.

It may also refer to:

- I Will Follow (film), a 2010 film
- I Will Follow (album), an album by Jeremy Camp and its title track
- "I Will Follow", a song by Chris Tomlin on the album And If Our God Is for Us...
- "I Will Follow", a song by the band Chapel Hart
- "Go On and I Will Follow", a quote from the William Shakespeare play As You Like It
