= Reckless (Jeremy Camp song) =

Single by Jeremy Camp

from the album Reckless
- Released: November 16, 2012
- Genre: Christian contemporary, Christian alternative rock, Christian rock
- Length: 3:27
- Label: BEC
- Songwriters: Jeremy Camp; Andy Dodd
- Producers: Jeremy Camp; Andy Dodd

Jeremy Camp singles chronology
"Overcome" (2012)	"Reckless" (2012)

Music video
- "Reckless" on YouTube

"Reckless" is a song by Christian Contemporary-Alternative-Rock musician Jeremy Camp from his seventh studio album, Reckless. It was released on November 16, 2012, as the first single from the album.

== Composition ==
"Reckless" was written by Jeremy Camp and Andrew "Andy" Dodd.

== Release ==
The song "Reckless" was digitally released as the lead single from Reckless on November 16, 2012.

== Charts ==
Chart (2012)	Peak position
US Christian AC (Billboard)	9
US Christian Airplay (Billboard)	14
US Hot Christian Songs (Billboard)	14
US Christian AC Indicator (Billboard)	7
