= Lay Down My Pride =

Single by Jeremy Camp

from the album Restored
- Released: June 4, 2005
- Recorded: 2004
- Genre: Christian rock
- Length: 3:30
- Label: BEC/Tooth and Nail
- Songwriters: Jeremy Camp, Jean-Luc LaJoie
- Producer: Aaron Sprinkle

Jeremy Camp singles chronology
"Take You Back" (2004)	"Lay Down My Pride" (2005)	"This Man" (2005)

"Lay Down My Pride" is a song by Christian rock singer Jeremy Camp. It was released as the second single from his 2004 album Restored.

== Critical reception ==
Upon the release of Restored, "Lay Down My Pride" received mostly positive reception from critics. Christa Farris of CCM Magazine described the song as a "full-on rocker". John DiBiase of Jesus Freak Hideout praised the song as one of the strongest songs on the album, opining that "Camp stretches his vocal style slightly further than usual, offering a strong chorus and anthemic rhythm". Russ Breimeier of Christianity Today, however, felt the lyrics in the song were uninventive.

"Lay Down My Pride" was nominated for Rock Recorded Song of the Year at the 37th GMA Dove Awards, ultimately losing to tobyMac's song "The Slam".

== Credits ==
- Jeremy Camp – all vocals
- Aaron Sprinkle – keyboards, programming, electric guitars, bass, percussion
- Joey Sanchez – drums

== Chart performance ==
"Lay Down My Pride" was released to Christian CHR and Christian Rock radio on June 4, 2005. It peaked at number one on the Radio & Records Christian CHR and Christian Rock charts. It ranked at number three on the 2005 year-end Christian CHR chart.

== Charts ==
Weekly

Chart (2005)	Peak Position
Radio & Records Christian CHR	1
Radio & Records Christian Rock	1

Year-end

Chart (2005)	Position
Radio & Records Christian CHR	3

== Release history ==
Date	Format	Label
June 4, 2005	Christian CHR radio	BEC/Tooth and Nail
June 4, 2005	Christian Rock radio	BEC/Tooth and Nail
