= Restored =

Studio album by Jeremy Camp
- Released: November 16, 2004; Mar 27, 2007 (Deluxe Gold Edition)
- Recorded: 2004
- Genres: Christian rock; pop rock; alternative rock
- Length: 44:29; 55:09 (Deluxe Gold Edition)
- Label: BEC
- Producers: Adam Watts and Andy Dodd: Aaron Sprinkle

Jeremy Camp chronology
Carried Me (2004)	Restored (2004)	Live Unplugged (2005)

Alternative cover
- Enhanced Edition

Alternative cover
- Deluxe Gold Edition

Professional ratings
Review scores
Source	Rating
Allmusic	4/5 stars
Christianity Today	2.5/5 stars
Jesus Freak Hideout	3.5/5 stars

Restored is the fourth studio album by American contemporary Christian musician Jeremy Camp. It was released on November 16, 2004, by BEC Recordings.

== Track listing ==
=== Standard release ===
All tracks are written by Jeremy Camp except where noted.

No.	Title	Writer(s)	Length
1.	"Restored"		3:24
2.	"Take You Back"		4:00
3.	"Even When"		4:09
4.	"Lay Down My Pride"	Camp, Jean-Luc Lajoie	3:30
5.	"My Desire"		3:42
6.	"Be the One"		3:31
7.	"Everytime"		3:32
8.	"Letting Go"		3:44
9.	"Breathe"	Camp, Adam Watts	2:56
10.	"This Man"		3:33
11.	"Innocence"		3:22
12.	"Nothing Else I Need"		4:06

=== Enhanced edition ===
All tracks are written by Jeremy Camp except where noted.

No.	Title	Writer(s)	Length
1.	"Restored"		3:24
2.	"Take You Back"		4:00
3.	"Even When"		4:09
4.	"Lay Down My Pride"	Camp, Jean-Luc Lajoie	3:30
5.	"My Desire"		3:42
6.	"Be the One"		3:31
7.	"Everytime"		3:32
8.	"Letting Go"		3:44
9.	"Breathe"	Camp, Adam Watts	2:56
10.	"This Man"		3:33
11.	"Innocence"		3:22
12.	"Nothing Else I Need (Plus Hidden Track)"		6:38

=== Deluxe gold edition ===
All tracks are written by Jeremy Camp except where noted.

No.	Title	Writer(s)	Length
1.	"Restored"		3:24
2.	"Take You Back"		4:00
3.	"Even When"		4:09
4.	"Lay Down My Pride"	Camp, Jean-Luc Lajoie	3:30
5.	"My Desire"		3:42
6.	"Be The One"		3:31
7.	"Everytime"		3:32
8.	"Letting Go"		3:44
9.	"Breathe"	Camp, Adam Watts	2:56
10.	"This Man"		3:33
11.	"Innocence"		3:22
12.	"Nothing Else I Need"		4:06
13.	"Burden Me"		3:09
14.	"Stand By"		3:02
15.	"Hungry"	Kathryn Scott	4:29
16.	"Let Everything That Has Breath"	Matt Redman	3:32

=== Standard Australian release ===
All tracks are written by Jeremy Camp except where noted.

No.	Title	Writer(s)	Length
1.	"Restored"		3:24
2.	"Take You Back"		4:00
3.	"Even When"		4:09
4.	"Lay Down My Pride"	Camp, Jean-Luc Lajoie	3:30
5.	"My Desire"		3:42
6.	"Be the One"		3:31
7.	"Everytime"		3:32
8.	"Letting Go"		3:44
9.	"Breathe"	Camp, Adam Watts	2:56
10.	"This Man"		3:33
11.	"Innocence"		3:22
12.	"Nothing Else I Need"		4:06
13.	"Go Home"	Camp, Mark Matthews	4:35

== Personnel ==
- Jeremy Camp – lead vocals, backing vocals, acoustic guitar (1–3, 5–8, 10, 12)
- Andy Dodd – keyboards and programming (1, 3, 7, 9, 10, 12), electric guitar (1, 3, 7, 9, 10, 12)
- Adam Watts – keyboards and programming (1, 3, 9), drums (1, 3, 7, 9, 10, 12), additional electric guitar outro (12)
- Aaron Sprinkle – keyboards (2, 4, 5, 11), programming (2, 4, 8), electric guitar (2, 4–6, 8, 11), percussion (2, 4–6, 8, 11), bass (4), Rhodes electric piano (8)
- Zach Hodges – acoustic piano (6)
- Dave Van Liew – electric guitar solo (8), electric guitar (11)
- Nic Rodriguez – bass (1, 3, 7, 9, 10, 12)
- Nick Barber – bass (2, 5, 6, 8, 11)
- Joey Sanchez – drums (2, 4–6, 8, 11)
- Cameron Stone – cello (12)
- Brandon Roberts – string arrangements and conductor (3, 10)
- Phil Peterson – string arrangements and performer (5)
- Adrienne Camp – backing vocals (1, 5, 8)

== Production ==
- Tracks #1, 3, 7, 9, 10, 12 and Tracks #14, 15, 16 from Deluxe Gold Edition produced and engineered by Adam Watts and Andy Dodd at Red Decibel Studios (Orange, CA).
- Drums recorded at Sonikwire (Irvine, CA); Drum Tech – Mike Jackson; Assistant engineer – Alex Bush.
- Tracks #2, 4, 5, 6, 8, 11 and Track #13 from Deluxe Gold Edition produced and recorded by Aaron Sprinkle at Compound Recording (Seattle, WA).
- Drum Tech – Aaron Mlasko
- Tracks #1, 2, 3, 7, 10 & 12 mixed by Chris Lord-Alge at Image Recording (Hollywood, CA), assisted by Keith Armstrong.
- Tracks #4, 5, 6, 8, 11 and Tracks #13–16 from Deluxe Gold Edition, mixed by JR McNeely at Compound Recording (Seattle, WA), assisted by Adam Deane (Tracks 5, 8 & 11) and Austin Thomason (Tracks 4 & 6).
- Track #9 mixed by Scott Humphrey
- Executive Producer – Brandon Ebel
- Mastered by Brian "Big Bass" Gardner for Bernie Grundman Mastering (Hollywood, CA).
- Photography by Brandon Dickerson
- Art Direction and Design by Asterik Studio and Brad Davis.
- Management – Matt Balm

== Accolades ==
In 2006, the album was nominated for a Dove Award for Pop/Contemporary Album of the Year at the 37th GMA Dove Awards. The song "Lay Down My Pride" was also nominated for Rock Recorded Song of the Year.

== Certifications ==
Region	Certification	Certified units/sales
United States (RIAA)	Gold	500,000^{^}
^{‡} Sales+streaming figures based on certification alone.
