= I Still Believe (Jeremy Camp song) =

Single by Jeremy Camp

from the album Stay
- Released: June 24, 2003
- Recorded: 2002
- Genre: CCM
- Length: 4:37 (album version)
- Label: BEC Recordings
- Songwriter: Jeremy Camp
- Producers: Adam Watts, Andy Dodd

Jeremy Camp singles chronology
"Walk By Faith" (2002)	"I Still Believe" (2003)	"Stay" (2003)

Music video
- "I Still Believe" on YouTube

"I Still Believe" is the fourth single from contemporary Christian singer-songwriter Jeremy Camp's first major label full-length album, Stay, released on June 24, 2003. This song was written after the death of Camp's first wife, Melissa. The song peaked at No. 5 on the US Hot Christian Songs chart, becoming his second top ten single. Camp released a live version which was performed on his 2005 album, Live Unplugged. The track appears on the compilation WOW Hits 2004.

The song inspired Camp to write his own life story of the same name, which was released in November 2003. Lionsgate announced that they would be filming a faith-based movie named for the song, after the success of the Erwin Brothers's I Can Only Imagine (2018). It was shot in the spring of 2019 and released on March 13, 2020.

== Background ==
Camp released the song as the fourth single from his second studio album Stay on June 24, 2003. He wrote the song after the passing of his first wife, Melissa, who died from ovarian cancer on February 5, 2001. Camp wrote on the liner notes of WOW Hits 2004, "This is the first song that the Lord gave me after the passing of my wife. I remember one night the Lord speaking to my heart to sit down and write a song, and I really didn't feel like writing at the time, but of course the tug was too strong. The whole basis of the song is that basically, no matter what happens in your life or how devastating a situation may be, God is still on the throne. And everything in His word is truth."

== Composition ==
"I Still Believe" is originally in the key of E-flat major. Written in common time, Camp's vocal range spans from B♭_{3} to G_{5} during the song.

== Track listing ==
CD release

1. "I Still Believe (Medium Key Performance Track)" – 4:47
2. "I Still Believe (Low Key Performance Track)" – 4:45
3. "I Still Believe (High Key Performance Track)" – 4:45
4. "I Still Believe" – 4:39
- Digital download
1. "I Still Believe" – 4:35
2. "I Still Believe" (Acoustic) – 4:48
3. "Empty Me" – 3:37
4. "You Are" [performed by Everman] – 4:03

== Music video ==
The music video for the single "I Still Believe" was released on February 25, 2009. The video features Camp performing the song on stage.

== Charts ==
Chart (2003)	Peak position
US Christian AC (Billboard)	6
US Christian Airplay (Billboard)	5
US Hot Christian Songs (Billboard)	5

== Certifications ==
Region	Certification	Certified units/sales
United States (RIAA)	Gold	500,000^{‡}
^{‡} Sales+streaming figures based on certification alone.
