= Beyond Measure (Jeremy Camp album) =

Studio album by Jeremy Camp
- Released: October 31, 2006
- Recorded: Early 2006
- Genre: Contemporary Christian music
- Length: 45:30; 52:47 (Special Edition)
- Label: BEC
- Producers: Ron Aniello; Aaron Sprinkle; Andy Dodd and Adam Watts; Steve Hindalong and Marc Byrd

Jeremy Camp chronology
Live Unplugged (2005)	Beyond Measure (2006)	Speaking Louder Than Before (2008)

Alternative cover
- Special Edition

Professional ratings
Review scores
Source	Rating
Allmusic	4/5 stars
Christianity Today	3.5/5 stars
Jesus Freak Hideout	4/5 stars

Beyond Measure is the fifth album by Jeremy Camp, released on October 31, 2006. It includes the singles, "Tonight", "What It Means" and "Let It Fade". A special edition version of the album was released on March 27, 2007.

He recorded this album shortly after marrying his wife, Adrienne. On August 15, 2006, Camp released an EP on iTunes, featuring a song from his new album and a song from his wife, Adrienne's new album, along with an interview about their new albums and talk about their tour. "Tonight", the title song from the EP, is on the new album along with the title song, "Beyond Measure", that was mentioned throughout the interview. Jeremy's younger brother, Jared Camp, plays electric guitar on a few tracks, including "Tonight" and "What It Means".

The album entered the Billboard 200 at No. 29, selling about 31,000 copies in its first week. This was also the album's highest position on the chart. It was certified Gold in April 2010.

== Track listing ==
All tracks are written by Jeremy Camp except where noted.

No.	Title	Writer(s)	Length
1.	"Tonight"		3:03
2.	"What It Means"		3:38
3.	"Beyond Measure"		3:23
4.	"Let It Fade"	Jeremy Camp, Adam Watts	3:44
5.	"Feels Like"		4:19
6.	"When You Are Near"	Ron Aniello, Camp, Jason Wade	4:05
7.	"No Matter What It Takes"		3:06
8.	"Take a Little Time"		4:14
9.	"Everything"		3:21
10.	"I Am Nothing"		4:07
11.	"Give You Glory"		4:06
12.	"Give Me Jesus"	Traditional	4:24
Total length:			45:30

Special Edition
No.	Title	Writer(s)	Length
13.	"We Remember"	Camp, Leeland Mooring	3:53
14.	"Can't Begin"		3:24
Total length:			52:47

== Personnel ==
- Jeremy Camp – vocals, backing vocals, acoustic guitar (5, 7–9), electric guitar (7)
- Aaron Sprinkle – keyboards and programming (1, 2, 10), electric guitar (1, 2), percussion (1, 2, 10)
- Ron Aniello – keyboards (3, 5–7), acoustic piano (3, 8), electric guitar (3, 6, 8, 9), bass (6), acoustic guitar (7)
- Andy Dodd – keyboards and programming (4, 11), acoustic and electric guitars (4, 11)
- Jared Camp – electric guitar (1–3, 5, 7, 9)
- Randy Williams – electric guitar (5–7, 9)
- Lars Katz – electric guitar (10)
- Michael Roe – acoustic guitar (12)
- Marc Byrd – electric guitar (12)
- Matt Woll – bass (1, 2), acoustic guitar (2, 10), electric guitar (2)
- Paul Bushnel – bass (3, 5, 7–9)
- David J. Carpenter – bass (4, 11)
- Joey Sanchez – drums (1, 2, 10)
- Josh Freese – drums (3, 5, 7–9)
- Adam Watts – drums (4, 11), additional programming (4, 11)
- Eddie Jackson – drums (6)
- Dennis Holt – drums (12)
- Steve Hindalong – percussion (12)
- Matt Slocum – cello (10, 12), string arrangements (10), bass (12)
- Kris Wilkinson – viola (10)
- David Angell – violin (10)
- David Davidson – violin (10)
- Adrienne Camp – additional backing vocals (4, 6, 8, 12)

== Production ==
- Tracks #1, 2 & 10 produced and engineered by Aaron Sprinkle; Recorded at Compound Recording Studio (Seattle, WA); Drums recorded at London Bridge Studio (Seattle, WA); Assistant Engineers – Aaron Lipinski, Larz Katz and Franklin Mazzeo; Drum Tech – Aaron Mlasko.
- Tracks #3 & 5–9 produced by Ron Aniello; Recorded at NRG Studios (N. Hollywood, CA) and Flat Out Studios (West Point, IN); Engineered by Eddie Jackson, Clif Norrell and Ron Aniello; Assistant Engineer at NRG – Casey Lewis.
- Tracks #4 & 11 produced and recorded by Andy Dodd and Adam Watts for Red Decibel Productions; Recorded at Red Decibel Studios (Orange County, CA) and Flat Out Studios (West Point, IN); Assistant Engineer at Flat Out – Jared Camp.
- Track #12 produced by Steve Hindalong and Marc Byrd; Recorded by Derri Daugherty at Sled Dog Studio (Franklin, TN).
- Tracks #1, 3 & 5–9 mixed by Tom Lord-Alge at South Beach Studios, assisted by Femio Hernandez.
- Tracks #2, 10 & 12 mixed by Michael Shipley at The Animal House; Assistant and Pro-Tools Editor – Brian Wohlgemuth.
- Tracks #4 & 11 mixed by Chris Lord-Alge at Resonate Music (Burbank, CA), assisted by Nik Karpen.
- Mastered by Brian Gardner at Bernie Grundman Mastering (Hollywood, CA).
- Executive Producer – Brandon Ebel
- A&R – Tyson Paoletti
- Project Coordinator – Jeff Carver
- Art Direction – Invisible Creature, Inc.
- Design – Ryan Clark for Invisible Creature, Inc.
- Photography – Jeremy Cowart
- Management – Matt Balm

== Accolades ==
In 2007, the album won a Dove Award for Recorded Music Packaging of the Year at the 38th GMA Dove Awards.

== Certifications ==
Region	Certification	Certified units/sales
United States (RIAA)	Gold	500,000^{^}
^{‡} Sales+streaming figures based on certification alone.
