= Mainstay (band) =

American Christian rock band

- Origin: United States
- Genres: Christian rock
- Years active: 2001–2008
- Label: BEC Recordings
- Past members: Justin Anderson; Scott Campbell; Dan Ostebo; Ryan DeYounge
- Website: purevolume.com/mainstayrock

Mainstay was a Christian rock band from Minneapolis, Minnesota. The band was formed in 2003 and is signed to BEC Recordings. While a lot of the band's music has decidedly Christian lyrics and messages, their music appeals to a large secular fanbase as well. Their music style has been compared to Copeland, Kutless, Sanctus Real, Lifehouse and The Goo Goo Dolls. Their debut album, Well Meaning Fiction, was released on February 21, 2006.

== Discography ==
- 2004: From Here To Where....
- 2005: Mainstay EP
- 2006: Well Meaning Fiction
- 2007: Become Who You Are

=== Singles ===
- "Believe," hit at least No. 5 on the R&R magazine's February 16, 2008 Christian CHR chart. It was the 20th most-played song of 2008 on U.S. Contemporary Christian music radio stations according to R&R magazine's Christian CHR chart. The song was written with Jeremy Camp.
- "Where Your Heart Belongs," No. 29 on the R&R Christian AC chart.
- "Become Who You Are," released to Christian CHR and Rock; as of October 10 it has not charted.

== Members ==
- Justin Anderson - Vocals, Rhythm Guitar
- Scott Campbell - Lead Guitar
- Dan Ostebo - Bass Guitar
- Ryan DeYounge - Drums
