= Stay (Jeremy Camp album) =

Studio album by Jeremy Camp
- Released: September 24, 2002
- Studios: Red Decibel Studios (Mission Viejo, California)
- Genres: Contemporary Christian music, Christian rock
- Length: 45:16
- Label: BEC
- Producers: Adam Watts; Andy Dodd

Jeremy Camp chronology
Burden Me (2000)	Stay (2002)	Carried Me (2004)

Professional ratings
Review scores
Source	Rating
Allmusic	4/5 stars
Christianity Today	3/5 stars
Jesus Freak Hideout	4/5 stars

Stay is Jeremy Camp's second studio album and his first major-label studio album, released in 2002.

== Track listing ==
All tracks are written by Jeremy Camp, except where noted.

No.	Title	Writer(s)	Length
1.	"Understand"		3:34
2.	"Right Here"		4:16
3.	"Walk by Faith"		3:59
4.	"Stay"		3:16
5.	"All the Time"		3:20
6.	"I Still Believe"		4:35
7.	"One Day at a Time"		4:01
8.	"Breaking My Fall"		3:43
9.	"Nothing"		3:11
10.	"I Know You're Calling"		3:58
11.	"Take My Life"	Camp, Jean-Luc Lajoie	3:07
12.	"In Your Presence"		4:15
Total length:			45:15

== Personnel ==
- Jeremy Camp – vocals, backing vocals, acoustic guitar
- Andy Dodd – acoustic piano, keyboards, electric guitar, 12-string guitar, backing vocals (6)
- Dave Vance – additional guitars (1, 3, 9, 10), electric guitar parts (3, 9, 11)
- Luke Agajanian – bass (1, 3, 9–11)
- Aubrey Torres – bass (2, 4–8, 12)
- Adam Watts – drums (1, 2, 4–8, 11), additional backing vocals, additional acoustic piano (2), additional guitar (4), percussion (12)
- Julian Rodriguez – drums (3, 9, 10)
- Leif Skartland – percussion (12)
- Brandon Roberts – string arrangements, conductor and composer (3, 6)

=== Production ===
- Brandon Ebel – executive producer
- Tyson Paoletti – A&R
- Adam Watts – producer, engineer
- Andy Dodd – producer, engineer
- JR McNeely – mixing at The Castle (Franklin, Tennessee)
- Steve Short – mix assistant
- Steve Kaplan – string recording at Citrus College (Glendora, California)
- Chris Bellman – mastering at Bernie Grundman Mastering (Hollywood, California)
- Ben Pearson – photography
- Kris McCaddon – design
- Matt Balm – management

== Certifications ==
Region	Certification	Certified units/sales
United States (RIAA)	Gold	500,000^{^}
^{‡} Sales+streaming figures based on certification alone.
