= This Man (song) =

Single by Jeremy Camp

from the album Restored
- Released: 2005
- Recorded: 2004
- Genre: Christian rock
- Length: 3:56
- Label: BEC
- Songwriter: Jeremy Camp
- Producers: Andy Dodd; Adam Watts

Jeremy Camp singles chronology
"Lay Down My Pride" (2004)	"This Man" (2005)	"Breathe" (2006)

"This Man" is a song by Jeremy Camp. The song is off his Restored album, which was released in 2004.

== Reception ==
The single has reached number one on the Billboard Hot Christian Songs chart. It was the twentieth most played song on Christian CHR radio in 2005 and "Breathe", a song from the same album, was the tenth most played song on CHR radio that year. "This Man" has aired on YouTube with video clips from the film The Passion of the Christ.

== Credits ==
- Jeremy Camp – all vocals, acoustic guitar
- Andy Dodd – keyboards, programming, electric guitars
- Adam Watts – keyboards, programming, drums
- Nic Rodriguez – bass
- Brandon Roberts – string arrangements and conductor

== Appearances ==
Live versions by Camp appear on his 2005 album, Live Unplugged, and his 2009 album, Jeremy Camp Live. "This Man" is also available on the compilation album WOW Hits 2007.

== Charts ==
=== Weekly charts ===
Chart (2006)	Peak position
US Hot Christian Songs (Billboard)	1

=== Year-end charts ===
Chart (2006)	Position
US Billboard Hot Christian Songs	5

=== Decade-end charts ===
Chart (2000s)	Position
Billboard Hot Christian Songs	22
