= Speaking Louder Than Before =

Speaking Louder than Before

Studio album by Jeremy Camp
- Released: November 24, 2008
- Recorded: May 2008
- Studio: Dark Horse Recording and Townsend Sound Studio (Franklin, Tennessee)
- Genre: CCM, pop rock
- Length: 48:46
- Label: BEC
- Producer: Brown Bannister; Jeremy Camp

Jeremy Camp chronology
Beyond Measure (2006)	Speaking Louder than Before (2008)	Jeremy Camp Live (2009)

Professional ratings
Review scores
Source	Rating
AllMusic	3/5 stars
Christianity Today	3/5 stars
Jesus Freak Hideout	3.5/5 stars

Speaking Louder than Before is the sixth studio album from contemporary Christian musician Jeremy Camp. It was released on November 24, 2008, and entered the Billboard 200 at No. 38.

== Background ==
In May 2008, Camp went into the studio to begin recording the album. Speaking Louder Than Before was recorded over five days, with Camp spending 12 hours in the studio each day. He co-produced the album with Brown Bannister.

Camp has said that Speaking Louder Than Before has a different theme to his previous releases and that he has "a more clear-cut purpose and vision of what I'm meant to do ... I see the hurt, the lack of direction, in this new generation. I always had a passion for youth, but this album is really aimed at them." Referring to the album's title and theme, he said, "I have walked through the valleys, the mountains, and plains. That's why I'm speaking up, that's why I'm speaking now and loud."

== Promotion and release ==
The first single "There Will Be a Day" was released around early September. It was the most-added song at R&R's AC and CHR charts, and it was also the highest-debuting track in its first week of entering the chart. The song was digitally released on September 23.

The album itself was subsequently released in the United States on November 24, 2008. It debuted at No. 38 on the Billboard 200, with 32,700 copies sold in the first week. Speaking Louder Than Before also reached number one at Billboard's Top Christian Albums, and in its first week became Camp's highest-charting album to date. "There Will Be a Day" reached number one at Christian CHR radio on November 28, and stayed at the top of the chart for two weeks.

A special edition of the album was released on December 5, which included a DVD with an hour of in-studio video footage, a booklet containing journal entries from Camp, a sticker, three art cards and a silicone bracelet.

== Track listing ==
All tracks are written by Jeremy Camp.

No.	Title	Length
1.	"Slow Down Time"	4:34
2.	"Capture Me"	4:05
3.	"Speaking Louder Than Before"	3:26
4.	"There Will Be a Day"	4:39
5.	"I Know Who I Am"	3:37
6.	"I'm Alive"	3:49
7.	"You Will Be There"	3:42
8.	"Healing Hand of God"	4:24
9.	"So in Love"	4:48
10.	"My Fortress"	4:19
11.	"Giving You All Control"	2:51
12.	"Surrender"	4:32
13.	"Christ Is Come" (iTunes Bonus Track)	3:43

== Personnel ==
- Jeremy Camp – lead and backing vocals
- Blair Masters – keyboards, acoustic piano, Hammond B3 organ
- Tom Bukovac – guitars
- Jerry McPherson – guitars
- Scott Denté – acoustic guitar (12)
- Matt Pierson – bass
- Dan Needham – drums (1–4, 6–9, 12)
- Chris McHugh – drums (5, 10, 11)
- Eric Darken – percussion
- Richie Peña – loops (8)
- Matt Balm – backing vocals
- Luke Brown – backing vocals
- Adie Camp – backing vocals
- Jean-Luc Lajoie – backing vocals

String Section (Tracks 4, 5, 7)

- Phillip Keveren – string arrangements (4, 7)
- Don Chapman – string arrangements (5)
- Monisa Angell, John Catchings, Janet Darnall, Jim Grosjean, Sarighani Reist, Pamela Sixfin and Karen Winklemann – string players

== Production ==
- Brandon Ebel – executive producer
- Tyson Paoletti – executive producer, A&R
- Brown Bannister – producer, overdub recording
- Jeremy Camp – co-producer
- Steve Bishir – recording
- Colin Heldt – recording assistant
- Mike Carr – recording assistant
- Billy Whittington – additional engineer, digital editing
- Kent Hooper – additional engineer, digital editing
- Ron Robinson – additional engineer, digital editing
- Craig Swift – additional engineer, digital editing
- Dave Dillbeck – additional engineer, digital editing
- F. Reid Shippen – mixing (1–3, 5–12) at Sound Stage Studios (Nashville, Tennessee)
- Buckley Miller – mix assistant (1–3, 5–12)
- J.R. McNeely – mixing ("There Will Be a Day") at Elm South Studios (Franklin, Tennessee)
- Ted Jensen – mastering at Sterling Sound (New York City, New York)
- Ryan Clark – art direction and design for Invisible Creature, Inc.
- Dave Hill – photography

== Accolades ==
In 2010, the album was nominated for a Dove Award for Pop/Contemporary Album of the Year at the 41st GMA Dove Awards.

== Charts ==
=== Weekly charts ===
Chart (2008–2010)	Peak position
US Billboard 200	38
US Christian Albums (Billboard)	1
US Top Rock Albums (Billboard)	10

=== Year-end charts ===
Chart (2009)	Position
US Billboard 200	193
US Christian Albums (Billboard)	7
Chart (2010)	Position
US Christian Albums (Billboard)	44
