= Reckless (Jeremy Camp album) =

Studio album by Jeremy Camp
- Released: February 12, 2013
- Recorded: 2012
- Genres: Contemporary Christian music, Christian rock
- Length: 41:04
- Producers: Jeremy Camp, Andy Dodd

Jeremy Camp chronology
Christmas: God With Us (2012)	Reckless (2013)	I Will Follow (2015)

Singles from Reckless
- 1. "Reckless" Released: November 16, 2012

Reckless is contemporary Christian musician Jeremy Camp's ninth studio album, and the producers are Camp and Andy Dodd. The album was released on February 12, 2013 via BEC Recordings. The first single from the album is entitled "Reckless", which was released on November 16, 2012. For the week of March 2, 2013, the album was the No. 31 most sold album in the nation via the Billboard 200 chart, on which the album was the No. 10 most popular rock album in the same week, and the most popular Christian album.

== Background ==
Jeremy Camp gave an interview to Worship Leader and was asked "What do you hope to communicate with Reckless?"

My hope is that this album encourages people to step into the fullness of what God has called them to do, and take action. The album is meant to encourage all of us to go out, not just me. If we can all work together and be in the same place spiritually, that body of Christ working together can fuel a passion that is truly great. There is power in numbers!

— Jeremy Camp, Worship Leader

In regards to the album's title, Camp was asked in the same interview with Worship Leader: "How does being reckless describe surrendering your life to Christ?"

Reckless started as a word that kept being embedded in my mind, so I started to look up its meaning. I found that it means doing something without regards for the consequences. It occurred to me that "Reckless" is a lot like true faith. When I step out in faith, no matter the circumstance, I know that God will take care of me. One of the biblical examples of living reckless for Christ that came to mind was Paul. In 2 Corinthians chapter 4, Paul returned to Lystra after being stoned for witnessing to people in the city because He knew the Lord called him to go back. In [Acts] 20:23-24, [Paul] writes, "I only know that in every city the Holy Spirit warns me that prison and hardships are facing me. However, I consider my life worth nothing to me; my only aim is to finish the race and complete the task the Lord Jesus has given me—the task of testifying to the good news of God's grace.' Paul served the Lord with all his heart. He knew that he was going to face trials and persecution, but God had placed a call on his life and wanted him to surrender his heart to the Lord. My desire, and the message in this song, is to completely surrender everything to God. I want to be able to do what God calls me to do without worrying. That's being sold out [reckless] for Christ. I don't want to miss out on the fullness of what God has for me, so when God calls me, I want to be willing to go!

— Jeremy Camp, Worship Leader

== Critical reception ==
Professional ratings
Review scores
Source	Rating
About.com	4/5 stars
AllMusic	3.5/5 stars
CCM Magazine	3/5 stars
Christian Broadcasting Network	3.5/5 spins
Christian Music Review	4/5 stars
Christian Music Zine	4/5 stars
CM Addict	4.5/5 stars
Cross Rhythms	7/10 squares
Indie Vision Music	3/5 stars
Jesus Freak Hideout	3/5 stars 2.5/5 stars

Reckless has achieved generally favorable ratings from the reviewers. Positive reviews came from About.com, AllMusic, Christian Broadcasting Network, Christian Music Review, Christian Music Zine, CM Addict, Cross Rhythms, Louder Than the Music, New Release Tuesday, ONCOURSE MAGAZINE and Worship Leader magazine. Reckless received mixed reviews from CCM Magazine, Indie Vision Music, and both Jesus Freak Hideout reviewers.

CM Addict David Bunce, who rated it four-and-a-half-stars-out-of-five, described it as "packed with a powerful punch". Kim Jones of About.com noted "solid vocals." Christian Music Zine's Joshua Andre wrote that "While musically Reckless is more aggressive than the previous album We Cry Out, it still however doesn't match the intensity of albums such as Stay and Speaking Louder Than Before" but called it "an enjoyable album." Roger Gelwicks of Jesus Freak Hideout noted how "Reckless aims to hold nothing back, even if the musical result isn't as demonstrative of its title."

Thematically, Thom Jurek of AllMusic questioned "why are there no songs that express the truly human vulnerability in a life of faith that Camp so readily and beautifully expressed in his riveting autobiography I Still Believe in 2011? [...] [H]ere's hoping that vulnerability comes into his music at some point." Kevin Davis of New Release Tuesday praised its "cohesiveness and spiritual maturity".

Critics both praised and lampooned the album's similarity to Camp's previous releases. Matt Conner of CCM Magazine noted that "[t]he pop/rock anthems on Reckless...resonate like his many hits to date". Alex "Tincan" Caldwell of Jesus Freak Hideout, who rated the album a two-and-a-half-out-of-five-stars, wrote that "Reckless rehashes similar musical and lyrical themes over and over again, and they are themes and melodies that Camp has hit many times before on previous records [...] there's nothing really original on it". Hannah Goodwyn of Christian Broadcasting Network wrote that "isn't mind-blowingly inventive, musically speaking [but it] has some instrumental surprises along the way." Worship Leader magazine's Lindsay Young wrote that the album "carries some songs that would be useful in the church" but that "an adjustment in instrumental arrangement and musicality would make the record stronger and more dynamic." At Cross Rhythms, Tony Cummings wrote that "All in all, this is an album which will find support from Camp's existing fans who probably won't even register the generic quality of many of the pop rock arrangements."

Consequently, Gelwicks criticized that "Despite some strong points, however, a lack of musical or lyrical complexity troubles some areas of Reckless. With a career spanning over twelve years with accolades galore, Camp is one of the more experienced songwriters in the business, but some of the fruits of his labors don't show it very evidently on Reckless." In closing, Gelwicks said that "While Jeremy Camp is thankfully still in the business of writing authentic songs that are unashamed in their inspiration, Reckless isn't among Camp's best work. After the first couple tracks, Reckless declines in the areas of exceptionality, and the few bright spots scattered throughout the project aren't quite enough to save the album from the 'ordinary' category. Camp's career can afford to take more risks than are demonstrated on Reckless, and perhaps his next effort will see the musical revival his talent deserves."

== Commercial performance ==
Reckless was the No. 31 most sold album in the United States for the week of March 2, 2013 on the Billboard 200 chart. In addition, the album was the tenth most sold via Billboard Rock Albums chart, and it was the best selling on the Christian Albums chart in the same week. The album has sold 41,000 copies in the US as of February 2015.

== Track listing ==
Reckless
No.	Title	Writer(s)	Length
1.	"Reckless"	Jeremy Camp, Andy Dodd	3:27
2.	"The Way You Love Me"	Camp, Dodd	3:42
3.	"Free"	Camp, Dodd, Toby Friesen	3:27
4.	"Paradise"	Camp	4:02
5.	"We Must Remember"	Camp	4:03
6.	"Shine"	Camp, Dodd	3:42
7.	"Come Alive"	Camp, Dodd	3:21
8.	"My God"	Camp, Dodd	3:58
9.	"We Need"	Camp, Dodd	3:38
10.	"Reign in Me"	Camp	3:39
11.	"Without You"	Camp	4:05
Total length:			41:04

== Personnel ==
=== Musicians ===
- Jeremy Camp – lead and backing vocals, additional piano
- Andy Dodd – keyboards, programming, guitars, backing vocals
- Tom Bukovac – guitars
- Toby Friesen – electric guitar on "Free"
- Tony Lucido – bass
- Dan Needham – drums
- John Catchings – cello on "Reign in Me"
- Luke Brown – backing vocals

== Production ==
- Produced by Jeremy Camp and Andy Dodd
- Recorded and Mixed by Andy Dodd at Red Decibel East (Nashville, TN).
- Drums, bass and additional guitars recorded by Ben Phillips at Superphonic (Nashville, TN).
- Mastered by Stephen Marcussen at Marcussen Mastering (Los Angeles, CA).
- A&R – Conor Farley
- Management – Matt Balm
- Art Direction – Invisible Creature, Inc.
- Design – Ryan Clark for Invisible Creature, Inc.
- Photography by Lee Steffen

== Charts ==
Chart (2013)	Peak position
US Billboard 200	31
US Top Christian Albums (Billboard)	1
US Top Rock Albums (Billboard)	10
