= Well Meaning Fiction =

Studio album by Mainstay
- Released: February 21, 2006
- Genre: Rock, Christian rock
- Label: BEC

Mainstay chronology
Mainstay EP (2005)	Well Meaning Fiction (2006)	Become Who You Are (2007)

Well Meaning Fiction is the first full-length studio album by the Christian rock band Mainstay.

It was rated three out of five stars by AllMusic.

== Track listing ==
1. "These Pages"
2. "Mirrors"
3. "Yesterday"
4. "This Could Be"
5. "Overnight on Nicollet"
6. "Take Away"
7. "Danger"
8. "Well Meaning Fiction"
9. "October Came Late "
10. "Down Silver Lake"
11. "Take Away (reprise)"

== Personnel ==
- Justin Anderson – lead vocals, guitar
- Scott Campbell – guitar
- Dan Ostebo – bass guitar
- Ryan DeYounge – drums
