= Carried Me =

Studio album by Jeremy Camp
- Released: February 10, 2004
- Recorded: 2003
- Genres: Christian rock; worship
- Length: 50:44
- Label: BEC Recordings
- Producers: Adam Watts & Andy Dodd: Steve Hindalong & Marc Byrd

Jeremy Camp chronology
Stay (2002)	Carried Me (2004)	Restored (2004)

Professional ratings
Review scores
Source	Rating
Christianity Today	2.5/5 stars
Jesus Freak Hideout	3.5/5 stars

Carried Me: The Worship Project is the third studio album from contemporary Christian musician Jeremy Camp. It was released on February 10, 2004, and entered the Billboard 200 at #102.

== Track listing ==
No.	Title	Writer(s)	Length
1.	"Trust in You"	Danny Daniels	03:40
2.	"Beautiful One"	Tim Hughes	03:57
3.	"Enough"	Chris Tomlin, Louie Giglio	03:57
4.	"Wonderful Maker"	Tomlin, Matt Redman	04:28
5.	"Hear My Voice"	Camp	03:49
6.	"I Wait for the Lord"	Scott Cunningham	03:31
7.	"Empty Me"	John Mark Comer, Gene Way	03:37
8.	"I Surrender to You"	Adam Watts, Gannin Arnold, Andy Dodd	04:12
9.	"Walk By Faith"	Camp	03:58
10.	"Revive Me"	Camp	03:26
11.	"You're Worthy of My Praise"	David Ruis	03:49
12.	"Longing Heart"	Camp	04:12
13.	"Carried Me"	Camp, Watts, Dodd	04:08
Total length:			50:44

== Personnel ==
- Tracks #1, 3, 5-13 Produced & Engineered by Adam Watts & Andy Dodd at Red Decibel Studios (Mission Viejo, CA).
- Tracks #2 & 4 Produced by Steve Hindalong & Marc Byrd; Engineered by Derri Daugherty & Jordan Richter at The Sound Kitchen (Franklin, TN) and Roswell East (Nashville, TN).
- Tracks #1, 5, 6, 7, 9-13 mixed by JR McNeely at The Castle (Franklin, TN); Tracks #3 & 8 mixed at Compound Studios (Seattle, WA).
- Tracks #2 & 4 mixed by Tom Laune at Bridgeway Studio (Franklin, TN).
- Mastered by Brian Gardner at Bernie Grundman Mastering (Hollywood, CA).
- Executive Producer – Brandon Ebel
- Management – Flat Out Entertainment/Matt Balm
- Art Direction and Design – Asterik Studio, Seattle.
- Photography – Matthew Barnes

== Certifications ==
Region	Certification	Certified units/sales
United States (RIAA)	Gold	500,000^{^}
^{‡} Sales+streaming figures based on certification alone.
