= Right Here (Jeremy Camp song) =

Single by Jeremy Camp

from the album Stay
- Released: 2002
- Recorded: 2002
- Genre: Rock
- Length: 4:16 (album version)
- Label: BEC
- Songwriter: Jeremy Camp
- Producers: Andy Dodd; Adam Watts

Jeremy Camp singles chronology
"Understand" (2002)	"Right Here" (2002)	"Walk By Faith" (2002)

Music video
- "Right Here" on YouTube

"Right Here" is a song written and performed by Christian singer-songwriter Jeremy Camp. It was the second radio single released in promotion of his debut studio album, Stay. The single reached the No. 9 position on the Billboard Hot Christian Songs airplay chart. This song also appears on the WOW Hits 2005 compilation album and Music from and Inspired by Bridge to Terabithia. Versions also appear on the live albums Live Unplugged and Jeremy Camp Live.

== Track listing ==
1. "Right Here" (Radio Mix)
2. "Right Here" (Album Version)

== Performance credits ==
- Jeremy Camp – vocals, backing vocals, acoustic guitar
- Andy Dodd – acoustic piano, keyboards, electric and 12-string guitars
- Adam Watts – additional acoustic piano, drums, additional backing vocals
- Aubrey Torres – bass

== Charts ==
Chart (2003)	Peak position
US Christian AC (Billboard)	10
US Christian Airplay (Billboard)	9
US Hot Christian Songs (Billboard)	9
