= There Will Be a Day =

Single by Jeremy Camp

from the album Speaking Louder Than Before
- Released: September 23, 2008
- Recorded: May 2008
- Genre: Christian rock
- Length: 4:43
- Label: BEC Recordings
- Songwriter: Jeremy Camp
- Producers: Brown Bannister; Jeremy Camp

Jeremy Camp singles chronology
"No Matter What It Takes" (2008)	"There Will Be a Day" (2008)	"Speaking Louder Than Before" (2009)

"There Will Be a Day" is the lead single by CCM musician Jeremy Camp from his fifth studio album, Speaking Louder Than Before. It was released to radio in mid-September 2008 and as a digital download on September 23, 2008.

The song was included on the compilation album WOW Hits 2010, and a live version is available on the 2009 album Jeremy Camp Live.

== Charts ==
After being released in September 2008, "There Will Be a Day" became a number-one hit on R&R's Christian CHR chart in early December. It stayed at the top position for nine consecutive weeks. During January 2009, it stayed at number one for three weeks on the Christian AC chart.

Chart (2008)	Peak position
Billboard Hot Christian Songs	1
Radio & Records – Soft AC/Inspo	2
Radio & Records – Christian AC	1
Radio & Records – Christian CHR	1

=== Year-end charts ===
Chart (2009)	Position
US Billboard Hot Christian Songs	4

=== Decade-end charts ===
Chart (2000s)	Position
Billboard Hot Christian Songs	8

== Certifications ==
Region	Certification	Certified units/sales
United States (RIAA)	Platinum	1,000,000^{‡}
^{‡} Sales+streaming figures based on certification alone.
