= Christmas: God with Us =

Christmas: God With Us

Studio album by Jeremy Camp
- Released: September 25, 2012
- Recorded: May 2008
- Genre: Contemporary Christian music, rock, pop rock, Christmas music
- Length: 36:32
- Label: BEC
- Producer: Brown Bannister: Jeremy Camp; Ben Shive

Jeremy Camp chronology
| We Cry Out: The Worship Project (2010) | Christmas: God With Us (2012) | Reckless (2013) |

Christmas: God With Us is the eighth studio album, and first Christmas album, from Christian contemporary musician Jeremy Camp, the album released on September 25, 2012, through BEC Recordings.

== Critical reception ==
Reviewer ratings
Review scores
| Source | Rating |
|---|---|
| Christian Music Zine | 3/5 stars |
| Indie Vision Music | 3/5 stars |
| Jesus Freak Hideout | 3.5/5 stars |
| Louder Than the Music | 3.5/5 stars |
| New Release Tuesday | 3.5/5 stars 4/5 stars |
| The Trades | C+ |
| Worship Leader | 3.5/5 stars |

Indie Vision Music's Jonathan Andre said that "Jeremy's album is the first of many to release in the year of 2012, and with some commendable melodies full of heart and promise, Jeremy's first Christmas album is able to set us in the right Christmas spirit as we start to remember the reason for our existence on Earth. Though not necessarily right on the song selection, Jeremy's infusing of both holiday and Christmas songs will give some appeal to the mainstream market, and will definitely be a positive if he chooses to breakout in that niche market later on in his musical career. With Christmas: God With Us whetting my musical appetite for more Christmas albums,...Well done Jeremy for such an enjoyable record!"

Jesus Freak Hideout's John DiBiase said that "Overall, Christmas: God With Us is a pretty good first holiday offering from Jeremy Camp. Fans of traditional Christmas songs will probably find a lot to love on here, while those looking for fresh and original material will most likely be disappointed. As for me, I tend to lean toward traditional covers delivered in a familiar form with a signature touch by current artists, and Jeremy has done a pretty good job at leaving his own mark on familiar songs. The additional lyrics don't always work, but it may be just enough of an update for some people to find these familiar songs fresh again. If anything, just hearing Jeremy rock out and have fun on a few songs here is worth checking out the record for alone. There should be at least a few songs on Christmas: God With Us that will be worth replaying each holiday season, while fans of Jeremy will certainly want to add this into their annual seasonal rotations."

Louder Than The Music's Rich Smith said that "This album feels a little like a mix tape of favourite Christmas songs, which could be the intention, as Camp says that he wanted to pick songs that he listened to growing up and make them his own. He has selected the Christmas carols that he and his family love to sing, and who can argue with that...Overall this is a good Christmas album and has a prayerful, reverent feel to it, giving us a great reflection and reminder that Christmas is the time to celebrate Jesus' birth for us."

New Release Tuesday's Jonathan Francesco said that "It's Jeremy Camp singing Christmas songs. That's what the cover advertises, and that's what you get. Nothing here is really shocking. Christmas music is a big draw and an artist of Camp's caliber obviously was bound to tackle a Christmas album eventually. It's just that an artist of Camp's caliber should have a release that's at least a little more "classic" than this."

Worship Leader said that "...Camp's signature growl graces some of our favorite Yuletide tunes in Christmas: God With Us...Solid beats, a pop/rock production that keeps Camp's pipes front and center, and a song list that takes no chances make this an easy pickup for fans or anyone looking for a new collection of favorites (and one added original)."

== Track listing ==
Christmas: God With Us
| No. | Title | Writer(s) | Length |
|---|---|---|---|
| 1. | "Jingle Bell Rock" | Joe Beal & Jim Boothe | 2:09 |
| 2. | "Hark! The Herald Angels Sing" | Public Domain | 3:00 |
| 3. | "Joy to the World" | Public Domain | 4:14 |
| 4. | "O Little Town of Bethlehem" | Public Domain | 5:04 |
| 5. | "Have Yourself a Merry Little Christmas" | Ralph Blane & Hugh Martin | 4:05 |
| 6. | "Let It Snow" | Sammy Cahn & Jule Styne | 2:10 |
| 7. | "Mary Did You Know" | Mark Lowry & Buddy Greene | 4:04 |
| 8. | "God with Us" | Brown Bannister, Jeremy Camp & Ben Shive | 3:07 |
| 9. | "O Come, O Come, Emmanuel" | Public Domain | 4:56 |
| 10. | "Away in a Manger" | Public Domain | 3:43 |
| Total length: | | | 36:32 |

== Personnel ==
- Jeremy Camp – lead vocals
- Ben Shive – acoustic piano, keyboards, additional guitars, string arrangements
- Adam Lester – guitars
- Tony Lucido – bass
- Dan Needham – drums
- EMT – additional percussion
- Nashville Recording Orchestra – strings
- David Davidson – string contractor
- Luke Brown – backing vocals
- Ellie Holcomb – backing vocals

Production

- Brandon Ebel – executive producer
- Tyson Paoletti – executive producer
- Brown Bannister – producer, engineer, editing
- Ben Shive – producer, engineer, editing
- Jeremy Camp – producer
- Ben Phillips – recording at Superphonic, engineering, editing
- Jeff Pitzer – additional engineer
- Andrew Mendleson – mastering at Georgetown Masters
- Townsend Sound – overdub recording location
- The Beehive – overdub recording location
- Vance Powell – mixing (1, 4, 5, 8, 10)
- Mark Petaccia – mix assistant (1, 4, 5, 8, 10)
- Shane D. Wilson – mixing (2, 3, 6, 7, 9)
- Justin Dowse – mixing (2, 3, 6, 7, 9)
- Lani Crump – mix coordination for Showndown Productions
- Conor Farley – A&R
- Brad Davis – design
- Lee Steffen – photography

== Charts ==
| Chart (2012) | Peak position |
|---|---|
| US Billboard 200 | 119 |
| US Top Christian Albums (Billboard) | 6 |
| US Holiday Albums (Billboard) | 1 |
| US Current Albums (Billboard) | 170 |
