= The Way (Jeremy Camp song) =

Single by Jeremy Camp

from the album We Cry Out: The Worship Project
- Released: August 9, 2011
- Studio: Fountaineye Studios, Port Elizabeth, South Africa
- Genre: CCM, pop rock, worship
- Length: 3:57
- Label: BEC
- Songwriters: Jeremy Camp; Grant Dryden; Brad Peens; Rob Williams
- Producers: Brown Bannister; Jeremy Camp

Jeremy Camp singles chronology
"Jesus Saves" (2010)	"The Way" (2011)	"Overcome" (2012)

Music video
- "The Way" on YouTube

"The Way" is a song by American contemporary Christian music singer and songwriter Jeremy Camp from his 2010 album We Cry Out: The Worship Project. It was released on August 9, 2011, as the second single. The song became Camp's sixth Hot Christian Songs No. 1, staying there for two weeks. It lasted 42 weeks on the overall chart. The song is played in a B minor key, and 80 beats per minute.

== Background ==
"The Way" was released on August 9, 2011, as the second single from his seventh studio album, We Cry Out: The Worship Project. The song is one of his personal favorites from the album, about identifying Jesus as the way of life. They nearly had the album complete until Jeremy's brother-in-law, Brad Peens, gave him an idea for a song that included an African choir. Jeremy gathered a few more ideas for the song, and they re-wrote it together. In an interview with "The Worship Community", Jeremy explained the feel he was trying to show in the song, “It’s very anthemic, a world-wide kind of song. It feels like a war song, a cry of God’s glory.”

== Music video ==
The music video for the single "The Way" was released on August 15, 2011.

== Track listing ==
- Digital download
1. "The Way" – 3:57
- Digital download (acoustic)
1. "The Way" – 4:05

== Charts ==
=== Weekly charts ===
Chart (2011)	Peak position
US Bubbling Under Hot 100 (Billboard)	16
US Christian AC (Billboard)	1
US Hot Christian Songs (Billboard)	1
US Christian AC Indicator (Billboard)	1
US Christian Soft AC (Billboard)	2

=== Year-end charts ===
Chart (2011)	Peak position
US Christian Songs (Billboard)	6
