= Tonight (Jeremy Camp song) =

2007 single by Jeremy Camp

Single by Jeremy Camp

from the album Beyond Measure
- Released: 2007
- Recorded: 2006
- Genre: Rock
- Length: 3:04 (Album Version)
- Label: BEC Recordings
- Songwriter: Jeremy Camp
- Producer: Aaron Sprinkle

Jeremy Camp singles chronology
"What It Means" (2006)	"Tonight" (2007)	"Give You Glory" (2007)

"Tonight" is a song written and performed by Christian singer-songwriter Jeremy Camp. The song was the second radio single released in promotion of his fourth studio album, Beyond Measure. The single reached the No. 4 position on Billboard's Hot Christian Songs airplay chart. This song is featured on the Digital Praise game Guitar Praise. A live version is featured on his 2009 live album Jeremy Camp Live.

== Track listing ==
1. "Tonight" – 3:04 (Jeremy Camp)

== Credits ==
- Jeremy Camp – all vocals
- Aaron Sprinkle – keyboards, programming, electric guitars, percussion
- Jared Camp – electric guitars
- Matt Woll – bass
- Joey Sanchez – drums
