= Take You Back =

Single by Jeremy Camp

from the album Restored
- Released: 2004
- Recorded: 2004
- Genre: Christian rock
- Length: 3:59 (album version)
- Label: BEC
- Songwriter: Jeremy Camp
- Producer: Aaron Sprinkle

Jeremy Camp singles chronology
"Empty Me" (2004)	"Take You Back" (2004)	"Lay Down My Pride" (2005)

Music video
- "Take You Back" on YouTube

"Take You Back" is a song written and performed by Christian singer-songwriter Jeremy Camp. The song was the first radio single released in promotion of his third studio album, Restored. The single reached the No. 1 position on the Billboard Hot Christian Songs airplay chart.

"Take You Back" was also the 2005 live album Live Unplugged and the 2009 live album Jeremy Camp Live. "Take You Back" was also the compilation album WOW Hits 2006.

== Credits ==
- Jeremy Camp – all vocals, acoustic guitar
- Aaron Sprinkle – keyboards, programming, electric guitars, percussion
- Nick Barber – bass
- Joey Sanchez – drums

== Charts ==
=== Weekly charts ===
Chart (2004–2005)	Peak position
US Christian AC (Billboard)	1
US Christian Airplay (Billboard)	1
US Hot Christian Songs (Billboard)	1

=== Year-end charts ===
Chart (2005)	Position
US Billboard Hot Christian Songs	1

=== Decade-end charts ===
Chart (2000s)	Position
Billboard Hot Christian Songs	14
