= Stay (Jeremy Camp song) =

2003 single by Jeremy Camp

Single by Jeremy Camp

from the album Stay
- Released: June 24, 2003
- Genre: Christian rock
- Length: 3:17 (Studio) 5:00 (Live Unplugged)
- Label: BEC Recordings
- Songwriter: Jeremy Camp

Jeremy Camp singles chronology
| "I Still Believe" (2003) | "Stay" (2003) | "Empty Me" (2003) |

"Stay" is the fifth single from Christian singer-songwriter Jeremy Camp's first major label full-length album Stay, released on June 24, 2003.

== Credits ==
- Jeremy Camp – vocals, backing vocals, acoustic guitar
- Andy Dodd – acoustic piano, keyboards, electric and 12-string guitars
- Adam Watts – additional guitars, drums, additional backing vocals
- Aubrey Torres – bass

== Awards ==
On 2005, the song won a Dove Award for Rock Recorded Song of the Year at the 36th GMA Dove Awards.
