= I Will Follow (album) =

Studio album by Jeremy Camp
- Released: February 3, 2015
- Recorded: 2014
- Genres: Contemporary Christian music, Christian rock, contemporary worship music
- Length: 38:50
- Labels: Stolen Pride, Sparrow, Capitol Christian Music Group
- Producers: Seth Mosley, Bernie Herms

Jeremy Camp chronology
Reckless (2013)	I Will Follow (2015)	The Answer (2017)

I Will Follow is the tenth studio album by Christian musician Jeremy Camp. Stolen Pride Records in association with Sparrow Records and Capitol Christian Music Group released the album on February 3, 2015. Camp worked with Bernie Herms and Seth Mosley on the production of this album. Tom Camp, Jeremy's father, plays harmonica on the track "Can't Be Moved", as well as his daughters, Isabella and Arianne, contributing background vocals. The lead single, "He Knows", was inspired by fans who asked him questions on how he dealt with losing his first wife to cancer, following the release of his autobiography, "I Still Believe". He then used those questions to help him write the song.

== Reception ==
Professional ratings
Review scores
Source	Rating
365 Days of Inspiring Media	4.5/5 stars
AllMusic	3/5 stars
CCM Magazine	4/5 stars
Christian Music Review	4.2/5
Christian Review Magazine	5/5 stars
CM Addict	3/5 stars
Cross Rhythms	9/10 squares
Jesus Freak Hideout	3/5 stars
Jesus Wired	8.5/10 stars
Louder Than the Music	4.5/5 stars
New Release Tuesday	4.5/5 stars
The Sound Opinion	4/5 stars
Worship Leader	5/5 stars

Mark Deming, giving the album three stars for AllMusic, writes, "I Will Follow demonstrates he remains a man with sincere and strong belief in the Lord, and a desire to share his testimony with the world." Signaling in a four star review by CCM Magazine, Grace S. Aspinwall recognizes, "a solid record bathed in scripture, and saturated with a more mature sound from Camp" because it "represents a grown-up version of the artist, and it's a stalwart and near-perfect effort." Caitlin Lassiter, indicating in a four and a half star review at New Release Tuesday, realizes, "The overarching theme of I Will Follow is to continue walking the path God has laid out for us, no matter how unexpected or uncomfortable...as much as the vocals and lyrics will be part of its success, the incredible instrumentation and background vocals stand out as a major part of why I Will Follow is such a well-rounded effort." Specifying in a five star review from Worship Leader, Steve Reed replies, "I Will Follow is an amazing collection of musical expressions from the legendary Jeremy Camp... From ambient, to rock, to acoustic, it all works together to make this album fresh and relevant." Tony Cummings, representing in a nine out of ten review by Cross Rhythms, reckons, "Listening to this outstanding song and indeed the whole album leads me to the conclusion that those jaundiced reviewers are badly undervaluing Jeremy's talent." In a three star review from Jesus Freak Hideout, Christopher Smith responds, "the lackluster lyrics and unoriginal musical formula drag this album down. That's not to say this is a bad album--in its weakest moments I Will Follow is average and in its best moments it is enjoyable." Jonathan Andre, awarding the album four and a half stars at 365 Days of Inspiring Media, writes, "Jeremy displays- a sense of maturity within these tracks." Awarding the album three stars from CM Addict, Andrew Funderburk says, "I Will Follow seems to be taking a small step back into how passionate and real his music used to be." Lindsay Williams, awarding the album four stars at The Sound Opinion, writes, "I Will Follow is easily the best addition to Camp’s discography thus far." Rating the album four and a half stars for Louder Than the Music, Jono Davies says, "Jeremy has started the year with a massive pop bang." Laura Chambers, awarding the album a 4.2 out of five at Christian Music Review, writes, "With a voice full of raw love, craving, longing, and hope, Jeremy Camp's desire couldn’t be any clearer". Rating the album an eight and a half stars for Jesus Wired, Rebekah Joy says, "I Will Follow is a great album full of emotional, worship, and soul-filled songs." Christian St. John, awarding the album five stars for Christian Review Magazine, writes, "I Will Follow is a release Mr. Camp can be proud of."

== Track listing ==
All tracks are written by Jeremy Camp, Seth Mosley except where noted.

No.	Title	Writer(s)	Length
1.	"Living Word"	Camp, Ian Eskelin	3:25
2.	"I Will Follow (You Are With Me)"		3:00
3.	"He Knows"		3:28
4.	"Finally Home"		3:39
5.	"Christ In Me"	Camp, Bernie Herms	3:31
6.	"'Til the End"		3:02
7.	"Can't Be Moved"		3:03
8.	"Only In You"	Camp, Matthew West	3:50
9.	"Same Power"	Camp, Jason Ingram	4:37
10.	"We Are the Dreamers"	Camp, Ingram, Mosley	3:21
11.	"Here I Am"	Camp, Ed Cash	3:54
Total length:			38:50

Deluxe edition
No.	Title	Writer(s)	Length
12.	"Spirit Now"		4:08
13.	"Be Still"		5:02
14.	"Perfect Love"		4:04
15.	"He Knows" (Acoustic)		3:21
16.	"Here I Am" (Acoustic)	Camp, Ed Cash	3:36
Total length:			59:01

== Personnel ==
Tracks 1–4, 6–11

- Seth Mosley – producer, recording engineer, vocal editing, editing, bass guitar, guitars, programming, keyboards, background vocals
- Recording studio – Blackbird Studio A, Nashville, Tennessee
- Recording studio – Full Circle Music, Franklin, Tennessee
- Mike "X" O'Connor – recording engineer, vocal editing, editing
- Celi Mosley – production coordination
- Dave Hagan – vocal editing
- Keith Everett Smith – vocal editing
- Jerricho Scoggins – audio editing
- Jeremy Camp – lead vocals, guitars, background vocals
- Ben Phillips – drums
- Miles McPherson – drums
- Leif Skartland – drums, background vocals
- Tony Lucido – bass guitar
- Walt Smith – bass guitar, background vocals
- Mike Payne – guitars
- Toby Friesen – guitars, background vocals
- Andrew DeRoberts – guitars
- Tim Lauer – programming and keyboards
- Donnie Cox – programming, keyboards, background vocals
- Adie Camp – background vocals
- Matt Balm – background vocals, vocal coaching
- Isabella Camp – background vocals
- Arianne Camp – background vocals
- Tom Camp – harmonica on "Can't Be Moved"
- Mark Endert – mixing (tracks 1–4)
- Sean Moffitt – mixing (tracks 6–11)

Track 5

- Bernie Herms – producer, recording engineer, piano, keyboards, programming
- Luke Fredrickson – producer, recording engineer
- Recording studio – Soul Fuel Studios, Nashville, Tennessee
- Sean Moffitt – mixing
- Andy Selby – editing
- Jeremy Camp – lead, backing vocals
- Fred Williams – additional programming
- Luke Fredrickson – guitars

Additional credits

- Brad O'Donnell – A&R
- Ted Jensen – mastering
- Mastering location – Sterling Sound, New York City
- Becca Wildsmith – art and design
- David Bean – photography
- Kris Whipple – grooming
- Tasia Treimer – styling

== Charts ==
Chart (2015)	Peak position
US Billboard 200	25
US Top Christian Albums (Billboard)	1
