= Walk by Faith =

Single by Jeremy Camp

from the album Stay and Carried Me: The Worship Project
- Released: 2002
- Recorded: 2002
- Genre: CCM
- Length: 3:59
- Label: BEC Recordings
- Songwriter: Jeremy Camp
- Producers: Andy Dodd; Adam Watts

Jeremy Camp singles chronology
"Right Here" (2002)	"Walk by Faith" (2002)	"I Still Believe" (2003)

"Walk by Faith" is a song by Jeremy Camp that reached No. 1 on the Hot Christian Songs Billboard chart. It is his second song to be made into a music video and is off Jeremy's first major-label studio album, released in 2002, called Stay. It later appeared on his second album, Carried Me: The Worship Project, in 2004. The song was written by Camp while he and his first wife, Melissa, were on their honeymoon.

== Credits ==
- Jeremy Camp – vocals, backing vocals, acoustic guitar
- Andy Dodd – acoustic piano, keyboards, electric and 12-string guitars
- Dave Vance – additional guitars and electric guitar parts
- Luke Agajanian – bass
- Julian Rodriguez – drums
- Brandon Roberts – string arrangements and conductor
- Adam Watts – additional backing vocals

== Certifications ==
Region	Certification	Certified units/sales
United States (RIAA)	Gold	500,000^{‡}
^{‡} Sales+streaming figures based on certification alone.
