= We Cry Out: The Worship Project =

Studio album by Jeremy Camp
- Released: August 24, 2010
- Genres: CCM, praise and worship music
- Length: 50:04
- Label: BEC
- Producers: Brown Bannister; Jeremy Camp

Jeremy Camp chronology
Jeremy Camp Live (2009)	We Cry Out: The Worship Project (2010)	Christmas: God With Us (2012)

Professional ratings
Review scores
Source	Rating
Christian Music Zine	4/5 stars
Jesus Freak Hideout	2.5/5 stars

We Cry Out: The Worship Project is the seventh studio album from contemporary Christian musician Jeremy Camp. It was released on August 24, 2010, and peaked at No. 1 on the Billboard Christian Albums Charts and No. 15 on the Billboard 200.

== Track listing ==
No.	Title	Writer(s)	Length
1.	"Jesus Saves"	Nick Herbert, Tim Hughes	3:48
2.	"Not Ashamed"	Jeremy Camp, Jon Egan	4:15
3.	"The Way"	Camp, Grant Dryden, Brad Peens, Rob Williams	3:57
4.	"Mighty to Save"	Ben Fielding, Reuben Morgan	5:23
5.	"We Cry Out"	Brenton Brown, Camp	3:57
6.	"You Are the Lord"	Camp, Matt Maher	4:22
7.	"Everlasting God"	Brown, Ken Riley	4:06
8.	"Overcome"	Egan	8:04
9.	"You Never Let Go"	Beth Redman, Matt Redman	4:30
10.	"Unrestrained"	Camp	3:15
11.	"King Jesus"	Camp	4:42
Total length:			50:04

The deluxe edition of We Cry Out features three acoustic versions of songs from the album, and one new song.

Deluxe edition
No.	Title	Writer(s)	Length
12.	"Magnify"	Camp, Morgan	4:22
13.	"We Cry Out" (Acoustic)	Brown, Camp	3:48
14.	"The Way" (Acoustic)	Camp, Dryden, Peens, Williams	4:05
15.	"Not Ashamed" (Acoustic)	Camp, Egan	4:21

== Personnel ==
- Jeremy Camp – lead vocals, backing vocals
- Jacob Sooter – acoustic piano, keyboards
- Blair Masters – acoustic piano, keyboards
- Brown Bannister – acoustic piano, keyboards, additional programming, additional percussion
- Randy Williams – electric guitars
- Andy Davis – electric guitars
- Jerry McPherson – electric guitars
- Scott Denté – acoustic guitars
- Walton B. Smith – bass
- Leif Skartland – drums
- Ken Lewis – percussion
- Eric Darken – percussion
- Adrienne Camp – backing vocals
- Luke Brown – backing vocals
- Missi Hale, Tom Lane, Jennifer Paige, Debi Selby, Michelle Swift, Aimee Joy Weimer, Terry White and Felicia Wolfe – choir on "Jesus Saves", "Overcome" and "Mighty to Save"
- Joy of Africa Choir – choir on "The Way"
- Hector Mjana – Joy of Africa Choir director
- Brad Peens – Joy of Africa Choir director

Production

- Brandon Ebel – executive producer
- Tyson Paoletti – executive producer, A&R
- Brown Bannister – producer, overdub recording
- Jeremy Camp – co-producer
- Steve Bishir – tracking at Dark Horse Recording Studio, Franklin, Tennessee
- Colin Heldt – tracking assistant
- Nick Kallstrom – tracking assistant
- Billy Whittington – overdub recording
- Doug Sarrett – overdub recording
- Colin Heldt – overdub recording
- John Bannister – digital editing
- Billy Whittington – digital editing
- Buckley Miller – digital editing
- Chuck Butler – digital editing
- Dave Dillbeck – digital editing
- Robin Ghosh – digital editing
- Rob Williams – engineer for Joy of Africa Choir, at Fountaineye Studios, Port Elizabeth, South Africa
- J.R. McNeely – engineer, at Elm South Studios, Franklin, Tennessee
- Adam Hall – assistant engineer
- Chris Lord-Alge – mixing ("Jesus Saves" and "Not Ashamed") at Mix LA
- Kirk Armstrong – mix assistant ("Jesus Saves" and "Not Ashamed")
- Nik Karpen – mix assistant ("Jesus Saves" and "Not Ashamed")
- Brad Townsend – additional mix assistant ("Jesus Saves" and "Not Ashamed")
- Andrew Schubert – additional mix assistant ("Jesus Saves" and "Not Ashamed")
- Ted Jensen – mastering at Sterling Sound, New York City
- Brian Kroll – A&R assistant
- Jordan Butcher – art direction and design
- Laura Dart – artist photography

== Accolades ==
The album was nominated for two Dove Awards: Praise & Worship Album of the Year and Recorded Music Packaging of the Year (for the Deluxe Edition), at the 42nd GMA Dove Awards.

== Certifications ==
Region	Certification	Certified units/sales
United States (RIAA)	Gold	500,000^{‡}
^{‡} Sales+streaming figures based on certification alone.
