= The Kry =

Canadian Christian rock band

- Genre: Rock
- Years active: 1992–present
- Labels: Freedom, Metro One Music, LeKri
- Members: Jean-Luc La Joie; Yves La Joie; Nic Rodriguez; Steve Marcia
- Past members: Pete Nelson
- Website: www.thekry.com

The Kry is a Christian rock and worship band from Quebec City, Quebec, Canada. The band consists of Jean-Luc La Joie (vocals, bass and acoustic guitars), Yves La Joie (drums, percussion, and backing vocals), Nic Rodriguez (bass guitar), and Steve Marcia (electric guitar).

In addition to their invitational songs, ballads, rock music, and thought-provoking lyrics, they are also known for "Cassie's Song". This song was inspired by the Columbine shootings and it looks to God for healing and an explanation, while encouraging believers to be steadfast at any cost.

In 1995, their album You reached number 27 on Billboard's Top Christian Albums chart. That same year Unplugged hit 40, while in 1996 What About Now peaked at 30th position. The Kry has been featured at events such as Spirit West Coast and the Harvest Crusades. They also frequently play free concerts and lead worship on Wednesday nights at Maranatha Chapel in San Diego.

In 2000, The Kry formed The Max Ministries to evangelize specific regions, including the French-speaking areas of the world. Although they tend to play a number of shows in Southern California, they also do extensive touring. The Kry has toured in the United States, Canada, Australia, England, France, Germany, Austria, Israel, Russia, Albania, Estonia, and Ireland.

== Discography ==
=== Albums ===
- I'll Find You There (1992, remixed 1995)
- You (1994)
- Unplugged (1995)
- what about NOW (1996)
- Let Me Say (2000)
- La Compilation (2000) Compilation of songs sung in French
- The New York CD Project (2002)
- Undone (2002)
- God of Infinite Worth (2004)
- Peut Être (2007) "Undone" in French with extra track "Lettre D'Amour" (Letter of Love)
- You Shine (2009)
- Let Your Kingdom Come (2015)

=== Songs on compilations ===
- Pop Hits: Christian Music's No. 1 Songs, "Everywhere" (Madacy, 2003)
- Sea to Sea: I See The Cross, "Holy Is Your Name" (CMC, 2005)
- Life Is Precious: A Wes King Tribute, "Hold On" (YMZ, 2006)
- GMA Canada presents 30th Anniversary Collection, "I'll Find You There" (CMC, 2008)

== Videography ==
- The Kry Unplugged (1995)

== Music videos ==
- I Know Everything About You (1994)
- Faithful (2005)

== Awards ==
Gospel Music Association Dove Awards

- 2000 The Kry was nominated by the Gospel Music Association for a Dove Award for their album "Let Me Say" in the category of Recorded Music Packaging of the Year.

Gospel Music Association Canada Covenant Awards

- 2007 The Kry won Francophone Album of the Year with "Peut Être", and Francophone Song of the Year with "Merveilleux".
- 2007 The band also received nominations for several Gospel Music Association Canada Covenant Awards: for Francophone Album Of The Year for "Peut Être", as well two of their songs were nominated in the category of Francophone Song Of The Year: "Merveilleux" and "Seulement L’Amour De Dieu".
