= Adam Watts (musician) =

American singer-songwriter

Adam Watts (born Adam Matthew Watts; December 8, 1975) is an American songwriter, producer, musician, visual artist, author, filmmaker, and educator.

His songwriting and productions are featured on over 50 Million Albums Sold Worldwide in both the mainstream and contemporary Christian music industries and have accrued nearly 4 Billion Streams.

In 2020 Watts was the Executive Music Producer (songwriting, production, mixing, and mastering) on the Netflix Original Musical "A Week Away", serving as the producer, mixer, and co-writer of the film's songs. The film won the Dove Award for "Inspiration Film of the Year" in 2021.

Most recently Watts was the Executive Music Producer (songwriting, production, mixing, and mastering) on the Angel Studios Original Musical Series "A Week Away the Series" (2025). Watts was also was a Producer on the series.

Watts is also a music educator. He authored a book called "The Human of Being Art: A Holistic Approach to Being an Artist and Creating Art."

Watts has served as an Adjunct Professor at Biola University (2017-2019) as well as Cal Baptist University (2021-2025).

In 2026 he launched a website for his arts education endeavors at www.MyArtistDNA.com. The website features his My Artist Type Quiz as well as other assessments for artists.

Watts is currently developing an original animated musical film project and a live action musical series.

In 2026 Watts is set to begin work on Season 2 of the "A WEEK AWAY" franchise (Angel Studios/Monarch Media).

== Biography ==
Adam Watts was born in Laguna Beach, California. He came from a musical family. His grandmother was a Hawaiian style steel guitar player and teacher, his mother plays accordion and piano, his father plays guitar and sings. His older brother plays guitar and his younger sister is a multi-instrumentalist, singer, songwriter and producer.

Adam began playing drums at the age of 10, inspired by the drummer in his brother's band which rehearsed in the home. Watts is a devout Christian. His faith is evident in much of his work as a songwriter.

Watts studied drumming throughout his late childhood and teens studying with various drum teachers including Glenn Young, John Hannan, Roy Burns, Evan Stone, Jim Wunderlich and Mike Jackson (in the Mission Viejo High School Drumline 1991–1994), Dave Weckl, Chad Wackerman, Joey Heredia. In 1993 he was the local winner of the Santa Ana Guitar Center Drum-Offs. In 1994 he won the National Will Calhoun Drum Solo Scholarship Contest Sponsored by Sonor Drums. In 1995, Watts attended Saddleback Community College where he studied music and philosophy, opting to leave after for one year to pursue a career in music full-time.

Watts was the drummer of local Orange County band Bulkhead (along with OC Supertones bassist Tony Terusa) from 1994 to 1997. In 1996 Adam contributed drum tracks to Gannin Arnold's pop/rock indie solo release entitled "One". He played his drums in various funk and top 40 cover bands in the Orange County/L.A. club scene including The Strangers, Stone Jonez and Soul Shaker. It was around this time that he began writing songs, singing and producing/engineering/mixing his own music. He also began to play live (singing and playing guitar) with various backing musicians and band members including Gannin Arnold, Melvin Davis, Adam Marcello, Drew Hester, Andy Dodd, Bill Mohler, Nate Wood, Luke Agajanian and Derek Frank.

In 2000, he contributed drums to bassist Melvin Davis's jazz/fusion solo album Tomorrow's Yesterday and percussion to Pax217's album TwoSeventeen. In 2001, Adam and his sister Jenn Watts wrote the theme song for the movie Pootie Tang (Directed and a screenplay by comedian Louis C.K.). This kickstarted his career as a full-time songwriter and producer. This year also saw the launch of his production company, Red Decibel, with Andy Dodd. Watts and Dodd produced Christian pop/rock artist Jeremy Camp's six-song indie EP which led to Jeremy's signing with BEC Recordings. Watts and Dodd produced and recorded the majority of Jeremy Camp's first two albums Stay and Carried Me in a three-month span in Watt's childhood home in Mission Viejo, CA in late 2001. Stay and Carried Me were both eventually RIAA Certified Gold. Watts and Dodd continued working with Camp throughout his career on his albums Restored, Beyond Measure and Live Unplugged. Watts and Dodd also produced various other contemporary Christian albums for 'Jadon Lavik' and 'The OC Supertones and Maranatha Music.

In 2003, Watts and Dodd were connected to pop artist Jesse McCartney through the independent A&R company TAXI. They wrote the songs Take Your Sweet Time and Beautiful Soul for McCartney, which led to his signing with Disney's Hollywood Records. Beautiful Soul became the title track and first single on Jesse's debut release. It went on to become a worldwide smash hit reaching number 5 on the Billboard Pop 100 charts, number 15 on the Billboard Hot 100, number 5 on Pop 100 Airplay and number 23 on the Adult Contemporary Charts. The "Beautiful Soul" video spent the maximum amount of time (50 days) on MTV's TRL Top 10 music video countdown. The album Beautiful Soul went platinum in 2004. The song appeared on various compilations and soundtracks including That's So Raven, A Cinderella Story and Kidz Bop 7.

Watts signed a publishing deal with Disney Music Publishing in 2004 and went on the write and/or produce (with Andy Dodd) on Aly and AJ's album Into The Rush, High School Musical 1, 2 and 3, Hannah Montana seasons 1, 2, 3 and 4, Jump In soundtrack, Go Figure soundtrack, Everlife's self-titled release and Ingram Hill, The Chronicles of Narnia: Prince Caspian end titles song "This Is Home", co written with Switchfoot, Kelly Clarkson's "Can We Go Back", Camp Rock 1 & 2 and The Jonas Brothers among others.

In 2011, Red Decibel added songwriter, producer, guitarist Gannin Arnold to their team. In addition to writing and recording new artist Joel Piper, they are currently working with new Hollywood Records signing, all girl rock group Cherri Bomb on their debut album.

2012 to present: Watts/Dodd/Arnold contributed as songwriters, producers, mixers and mastering engineers to American Idol finalist, Colton Dixon's debut album "A Messenger". The team is reported to have been collaborating extensively with American Idol finalist Angie Miller. During this time, RED DECIBEL have also contributed songs to a variety of projects within Disney including, Austin & Ally (the song "Parachute"), the theme song to a new live show at Disneyland in Anaheim and the opening/titles titles song for an upcoming animated feature entitled Tinkerbell Pirate Fairy. The song features solo artist Natasha Beddingfield on vocals.

Most recently RED DECIBEL contributed four productions (which Watts mixed) to Colton Dixon's sophomore album "Anchor" which debuted at #1 on the iTunes Christian & Gospel Album Chart. The group also co-wrote the songs "Loud and Clear" and "This Isn't The End" as well as the bonus track "Where I End". Watts also played drums on the track "Our time Is Now".

While RED DECIBEL still exists as Watts/Dodd/Arnold, in 2014, Watts/Arnold formed a separate songwriting, production, mixing/mastering and artist development entity known as BROKEN CITY. The pair are focusing on the development and launch of two new solo artists, iRussi and Sanni as well as various other indie and major label projects in the mainstream and CCM markets.

July 2014 saw the release of the Watts/Arnold band project MOON KILLER. Their debut album, "Pretty Stupid" is a set of intense alternative/rock songs which add a modern twist to influences such as Led Zeppelin, Black Sabbath and Soundgarden. The lineup consists of just Watts (Drums, Percussion, Synths and Vocals) and Arnold (Guitars, Bass, Synths). The pair co-produced and Watts mixed the album.

=== Visual arts ===
In late 2012 Watts began to more seriously delve into visual arts. A long time interest in photography and graphic design expanded into leather handcrafting and the fine arts. AMW HUMAN DECOR is the brand name surrounding his leather works which include bracelets, bags and wallets with unique designs which often incorporate bison leather, early 20th century World War I and World War II rifle sling leather and antique hardware including vintage camera and clock parts.

Watts' mixed media assemblage fine artwork incorporates objects from the Victorian era through the early 20th century. His highly conceptual work often includes found objects, early medical tools, primitive wood mechanical objects such as gears and pulleys as well as taxidermy and skeletal elements including animal skulls, feathers etc. His work has been shown at Artology, The Paul Williams Gallery, Bunker 1970, The Egan (within the Magoski Art Colony), Artservatory as well as his own gallery and retail space which was located in Downtown Fullerton, CA. Watts has an upcoming exhibition at the Center Gallery in Anaheim.

Most recently Watts had multiple works chosen to be included in the Brea Art Gallery's 29th Annual Juried Exhibit "MADE IN CALIFORNIA" as well as in the OCCCA's show entitled "THE BODY EXHIBIT" with works chosen by world renowned assemblage artist George Herms.

== Selected song discography ==
- "Amazing Grace (How Silent the Sound)"" – from the 2025 Angel Studios Original Series "A WEEK AWAY The Series"
- "Never Be the Same"" – from the 2025 Angel Studios Original Series "A WEEK AWAY The Series"
- "Camp Crush"" – from the 2025 Angel Studios Original Series "A WEEK AWAY The Series"
- "Let's Go Make a Memory"" – from the 2021 Netflix Original film "A WEEK AWAY"
- "Where I Belong"" – Kevin Quinn (from the 2021 Netflix Original film "A WEEK AWAY")
- "The Rest of Me" – Adam Watts (from the album "The Devil & The Light")
- "Mend" – Adam Watts (from the album "The Devil & The Light")
- "Back to Earth" – Adam Watts (from the album "When a Heart Wakes Up")
- "Never Gone" – Colton Dixon (from the album "A Messenger")
- "Universe Electric" – Angie Miller (from the EP "Weathered")
- "Way Out" – Adam Watts (from the album "Way Out")
- "Shake The Ground" – Cherri Bomb (from the album "The is the End of Control")
- "This Is Home" – Switchfoot (For the soundtrack to "The Chronicles of Narnia: Prince Caspian")
- "Can We Go Back" – Kelly Clarkson
- "Let It Fade" – Jeremy Camp
- "Reckless" – Adam Watts (from the album "Murder Yesterday")
- "Life On Earth" – Adam Watts (from the album "Life On Earth")
- "Poison Soul" – Adam Watts (from the album "FALLBORN")
- "The Glow" – Shannon Saunders (Disney Princess franchise in 2011, it served as the official anthem for Rapunzel's royal induction)
- "Carried Me" – Jeremy Camp
- "How Does It Feel" – Adam Watts (from the album "The Noise Inside")
- "Critical Condition" – Adam Watts (from the album "The Noise Inside")
- "Beautiful Soul" – Jesse McCartney
- "What I've Been Looking For" – (From Disney's "High School Musical")
- "Just So You Know" – Jesse McCartney
- "Right Where You Want Me" – Jesse McCartney
- "Where Do I Go From Here" – Sebastian Mego – Jump In
- "Gotta Go My Own Way" – High School Musical 2
- "Just Like You" – Hannah Montana – Season 1
- "Make Some Noise" – Hannah Montana – Season 2
- "I Gotta Find You" – Joe Jonas – Camp Rock
- "This Is Me" – Demi Lovato and Joe Jonas – Camp Rock
- "Just Wanna Be With You" – High School Musical 3: Senior Year
- "Every Part of Me" – Hannah Montana – Season 3
- "This is Our Song" – Demi Lovato, Joe Jonas, Nick Jonas and Alyson Stoner – Camp Rock 2: The Final Jam
- "It's Not Too Late" – Demi Lovato – Camp Rock 2: The Final Jam
- "Wherever I Go" – Hannah Montana Forever
- "Turn Up the Music" – Lemonade Mouth
- "Better Together" – Ross Lynch – Austin and Ally
- "Who I'm Gonna Be" – Coco Jones – Let it Shine
- "Good To Be Home" – Coco Jones – Let it Shine
- "Parachute" – Laura Marano – Austin and Ally: Turn It Up
- "As Long As I Have You" – Dove Cameron – Liv and Maddie
- "Live the Magic" – Disneyland Forever
- "Happily Ever After" – Hong Kong Disneyland 10th anniversary theme song and Magic Kingdom fireworks show song.
- "Stand By You" – Anna Gjebrea – Junior Eurovision

== Adam Watts – solo artist ==
In 2002 Watts contributed as a solo artist to projects such as, Songs For A Purpose Driven Life (based on Rick Warren's best selling book The Purpose Driven Life), and The Left Behind 2 soundtrack. In 2003, Watts signed to BEC Recordings and released his critically acclaimed first album The Noise Inside. In 2005 Watts amicably left BEC Recordings to pursue an indie career. In 2006 Watts independently released his album "Sleeping Fire".

After the breakup of his alt/rock project, Fallborn in early 2010, Watts went to work on his third solo effort entitled "Murder Yesterday". The album released worldwide digitally, on September 21, 2010.

"Murder Yesterday" marks a return to Watts' singer-songwriter roots. While in the past Watts' used piano only intermittently, this album's material relies heavily on the instrument, as well as a more spacious, organic production style. The extensive collaboration with the Los Angeles-based strings group, The Section Quartet (Foo Fighters, Snow Patrol, Ryan Adams) served to further distinguish "Murder Yesterday" from previous works.

Watt's toured through New York, Chicago, L.A. and Seattle as part of author Cornelia Funke's "Get Reckless Tour". Watts performed the song "Reckless" which was inspired by Funke's book of the same name.

=== 2013, Album: "Life on Earth" ===
Watts released his solo album entitle "Life on Earth".

=== 2014, Album: "Way Out" ===
On April 7, 2014 Watts released his sixth studio album which reportedly marks a bit of a departure from the more straightforward songwriting of previous releases. The album is said to lean more heavily on influences including Philip Glass and Thomas Newman while still incorporating his singer-songwriter and rock roots.

=== 2016, Album: "The Hero and the Pain" ===
On March 13, 2016 Watts released his seventh studio album "The Hero and the Pain". This album features the song "World War Three" which features Watts' first vocal duet, with female singer-songwriter, iRussi.

The vocals from the songs "Let You Win" and "Where to Begin" were both used as source material for the 2019 show "CEDE" from the Broken City Percussion ensemble.

=== 2018, Album: "When a Heart Wakes Up" ===
On April 3, 2018 Watts released his eighth studio album "When a Heart Wakes Up".

A 5 Star Review from the online publication Jesus Freak Hideout stated:

"In summary, When a Heart Wakes Up shoots straight for the moon as if to bring it crashing down. Watts doesn't rely on cheap tricks or catchy hooks, but rather emphasizes true musicianship. The album isn't desperate for attention, choosing instead to stand on its own two legs. Because of this, it most decidedly contends to be one of 2018's greatest offerings; there are few projects slated for release later this year which could likely challenge its standing. The album's runtime is set at a smooth 43 minutes, clocking out right when it should. Yet somehow, the listener just may be left wanting more..."

Much of Watts' solo work has been used as source material in the marching arts world. The vocals from the song "Love You More" was used as source material for the 2018 show "Fall" from the world-class Broken City Percussion ensemble.

=== 2019, Album: "Reason to Grow EP" ===
On May 23rd, 2019 Watts released his 9th studio release "Reason to Grow EP", which features four songs. Track listing: 1) A Reason to Grow 2) Hold Me Tight, Leave Me Alone 3) Black Snow 4) Hallelujah, Amen

=== 2021, Album: "The Devil & The Light" ===
On December 16th, 2021 Watts released his 10th studio album "The Devil & The Light", featuring 13 new songs.

Track listing:

1) The Rest of Me 2) A Long Time Here 3) Mend 4) Been to the Valley 5) Fragile Chemistry 6) Fun 7) Let's Make a Fire 8) Disappear 9) Dark Heart 10) All the Signs 11) All My Friends 12) World Without Weight 13) The Devil & The Light

=== Albums ===
Year	Title	Label(s)
2004	The Noise Inside	BEC Recordings
2006	Sleeping Fire	Red Decibel Music
2010	Murder Yesterday	Dying Ego Records
2012	Fallborn	Dying Ego Records
2013	Life on Earth	Dying Ego Records
2014	Way Out	Dying Ego Records
2016	The Hero and the Pain	Broken City Artists
2018	When a Heart Wakes Up	Broken City Artists
2019	Reason to Grow EP	Broken City Artists
2021	The Devil & The Light	Broken City Artists

== Fallborn (2008–2010) ==
In late 2008, Watts, along with musicians Jules, Nic and Matt Rodriguez (all brothers), FALLBORN was formed. FALLBORN's debut single "Poison Soul" released on iTunes in 2009 and has received radio play on mainstream alt/rock radio, debuting on LA's 106.7 KROQ Locals Only show and Tucson, AZ's KFMA 92.1, among others. The band worked throughout 2009 recording their debut album which was mixed by Grammy winning producer/engineer Jack Joseph Puig (John Mayer, U2). Apart from a 5-song promotional EP, the album never saw the light of day. In early 2010, due to creative differences, FALLBORN disbanded.
