= Andy Dodd =

American Christian musician

- Also known as: Andy
- Born: Andrew Creighton Dodd; March 28, 1977 (age 49)
- Origin: Los Angeles, California; Nashville, Tennessee
- Occupations: Music producer, composer, songwriter
- Instruments: Guitar, drums, keys, piano
- Years active: 2000–present
- Label: Red Decibel
- Website: andydoddmusic.com

Andrew Creighton Dodd (born March 28, 1977) is an American music producer and songwriter. His work spans two decades and sales of over 50 million albums worldwide. He is the co-owner of multiple production companies partnered with The Walt Disney Company.

== Early and personal life ==
Dodd was born, Andrew Creighton Dodd, on March 28, 1977, and he is based out of studios in Los Angeles, California and Nashville, Tennessee, where he and his partner, Adam Watts started Red Decibel Music Group.

== Music career ==
His music production songwriting career began in 2000, and he has worked with artists including Miley Cyrus, Demi Lovato, Zac Efron, Kelly Clarkson, Natasha Bedingfield, Jonas Brothers, Jesse McCartney, Jeremy Camp, Billy Ray Cyrus, Switchfoot, Jadon Lavik and projects including Hannah Montana, High School Musical, The Chronicles of Narnia, Avengers, Disneyland, Walt Disney World, Tokyo Disneyland, Hong Kong Disneyland, Camp Rock, Tangled The Series, Austin & Ally and Descendants.

A full list of credits can be found here, Allmusic.com Andy Dodd.

Awards include ASCAP Pop Awards, ASCAP Film/TV Awards and GMA Dove Awards for Special Event Album of the Year in 2006, for Music Inspired by The Chronicles of Narnia, while he won for Rock/Contemporary Album of the Year in 2013, for A Messenger by Colton Dixon, where he also won at the 2015 GMA Dove Awards for Rock/Contemporary Album of the Year, with regards to his production work on Anchor from Colton Dixon. In 2017, Dodd produced P!nk's cover of Jefferson Airplanes' 1967 hit "White Rabbit," which served as a Japan bonus track for her seventh studio album "Beautiful Trauma."
