= Jeremy Camp =

American singer and songwriter (born 1978)

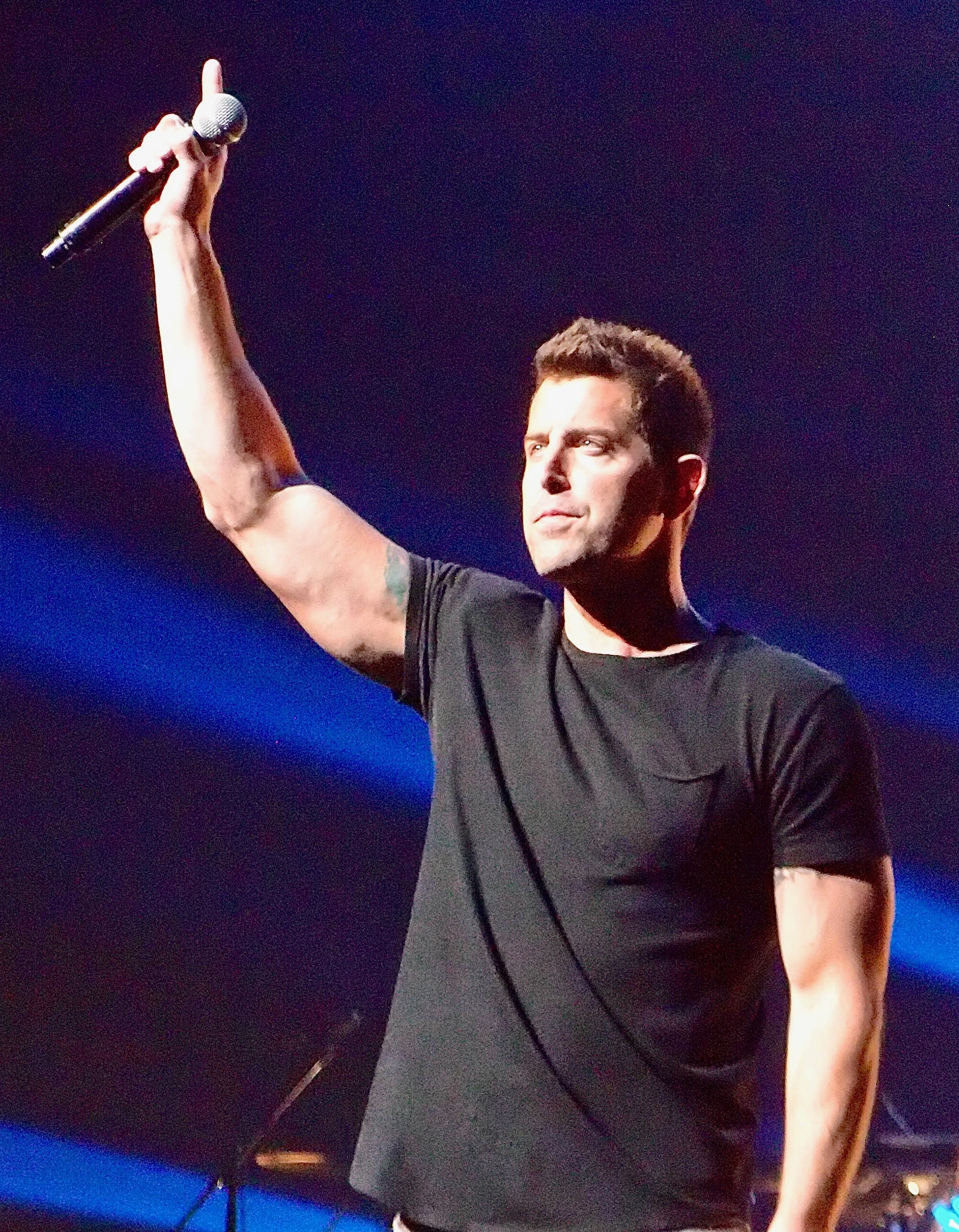
- Camp in 2019
- Born: Jeremy Thomas Camp; January 12, 1978 (age 48); Lafayette, Indiana, U.S.
- Occupations: Singer; songwriter
- Years active: 2000–present
- Spouses: Melissa Lynn Henning-Camp (m. 2000; died 2001); Adrienne Liesching (m. 2003)
- Children: 3
- Awards: Full list
- Musical career
- Genre: Contemporary Christian music · Christian rock
- Instruments: Vocals; guitar
- Labels: BEC; Capitol Christian
- Website: jeremycamp.com

Jeremy Thomas Camp (born January 12, 1978) is an American contemporary Christian singer and songwriter from Lafayette, Indiana. He has released eleven albums, four of them RIAA-certified as Gold, and two live albums. Camp's original music is a mixture of ballads and up-tempo songs with rock influence. He has won five GMA Dove Awards, has been nominated for three American Music Awards, and was nominated for a Grammy Award for Best Pop/Contemporary Gospel Album in 2010 for his album, Speaking Louder Than Before. I Still Believe, a film based on Camp's first marriage, was released in 2020, with Camp being played by New Zealand actor KJ Apa.

== Early life ==
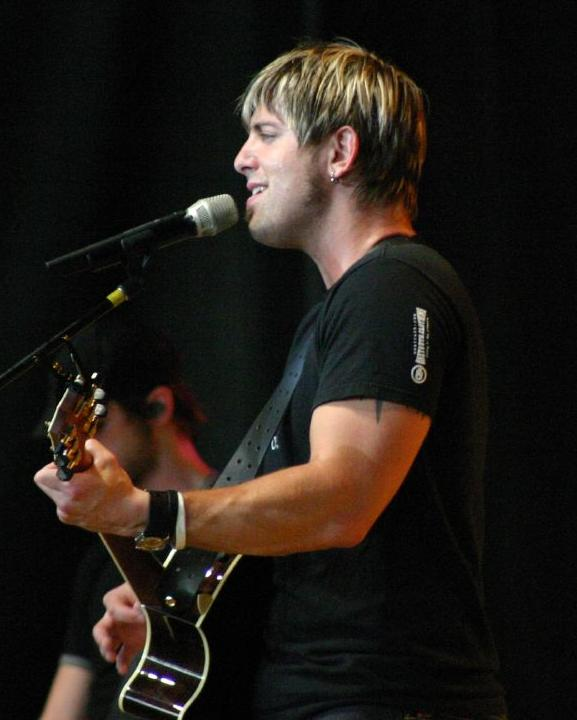
Camp performing in 2006

Jeremy Camp was born in Lafayette, Indiana. His father Tom, the pastor at Harvest Chapel (associated with Calvary Chapel Costa Mesa), taught him how to play guitar. He studied theology at Calvary Chapel Bible College in Murrieta, California, and graduated with a degree. After his studies, he was ordained minister. After one of the worship leaders heard him play in the kitchen of the school, he urged Camp to become a part of the worship team. Soon, he led worship and played all over Southern California.

== Career ==
=== 2000s ===
His first independent album, Burden Me, was released in 2000. In 2002, he produced his first label album, Stay, with BEC Recordings.

Camp has scored 32 No. 1 hits on Christian Radio across all formats (Contemporary Hit Radio, Hot AC, Rock, and Inspirational Charts). His album Beyond Measure contributed six back-to-back No. 1 hits, including the track "Let It Fade", which held the No 1. spot for 10 weeks on AC Radio. His first single was "Understand". He has made ten music videos: "Understand", "Walk by Faith", "Take You Back", "Tonight", "Give You Glory", "Let It Fade", "I Am Willing" (a song that was not included on any of his albums), "Speaking Louder Than Before", "The Way", and "Reckless".

Camp scored Christian music top spots for "Take You Back" and "Lay Down My Pride". He also was voted the Best Male Artist in the 2005 Reader's Choice Music Awards in the Christianity Today magazine. Camp was also ASCAP 2005 Songwriter of the Year and won the Dove Award for the Male Vocalist of the Year for the second consecutive year. In 2005, he recorded the song "Open Up Your Eyes" for the compilation release Music Inspired by the Chronicles of Narnia: The Lion, the Witch, and the Wardrobe, a September 2005 album which contained original songs written by various Christian artists for the 2005 film The Chronicles of Narnia: The Lion, the Witch, and the Wardrobe. Camp closed the year with both Stay and Carried Me: the Worship Project being RIAA-certified as Gold.

Camp earned the top honors at the Twenty-Eighth Annual ASCAP Music Awards, winning the Songwriter of the Year award ("Take You Back" and "This Man"). "Take You Back" also earned him the Song of the Year award. Camp won two 2006 CCM Reader's Choice Awards, for Favorite Artist and Favorite Male Artist. He took part in the Dove award for Special Event Album of the Year, which went to Music Inspired by The Chronicles of Narnia: The Lion, the Witch and the Wardrobe. He released a special edition of his hit album, Restored. Four new songs were included on Restored: The Deluxe Gold Edition as well as a letter to his fans.

Camp went back into the studio to record Beyond Measure in early 2006 and was released on October 31, 2006. Camp is also credited as producer for his wife's album, Don't Wait, which was released in September 2006. "Tonight", the first single from the album Beyond Measure, was released in mid-August and eventually hit No. 1 on Christian contemporary hit radio. It was the eleventh most-played single on HR stations in 2007. "Give Me Jesus", the third single off Beyond Measure made it into the top 5 on Inspirational radio. The fourth single, "Give You Glory", debuted on Jewish AJ radio at No. 16. His song "Let It Fade" was the seventh most-played song on HR radio in 2007. That year he also released a two-disc (CD and DVD) for his concert tour "Live Unplugged" recorded in Franklin, Tennessee.

His song "No Matter What" was the fourth most-played song on R&R magazine's Christian CHR chart for 2008. He also came out with his new studio album Speaking Louder Than Before, containing the hit lead single "There Will Be a Day". On November 17, 2009, Camp released another live album: Jeremy Camp Live. This album featured songs from all of Camp's previous albums. His Speaking Louder Than Before received his first Grammy nomination.

=== 2010s ===
Beyond Measure was certified as Gold by the RIAA. The worship album We Cry Out was released on August 24, 2010, and also certified Gold. Camp was also a judge for the 10th annual Independent Music Awards to support independent artists' careers.

On May 20, 2011, Camp released his first book, I Still Believe. The book is about Camp's life, illuminating his childhood, the death of his first wife, and where he believes God has brought him.

Reckless was released on February 12, 2013. This was Camp's first studio album since 2008, when he released Speaking Louder Than Before. The first single released from the album was the title track, "Reckless". A video accompanied the single in February 2013. "Reckless" was followed by his second single, "My God", which reached number 5 on the Christian Songs Chart. He also released an acoustic video of "My God" to his Vevo Channel in 2013.

Camp released his ninth studio album, I Will Follow, on February 3, 2015. The album's lead single, "He Knows", was released in September 2014.

Camp released his tenth studio album, The Answer, on October 6, 2017. The album's lead single, "Word of Life", was released in June 2017.

Camp released his eleventh studio album, The Story's Not Over, on September 20, 2019. The album's lead single was "Dead Man Walking".

== Personal life ==
Camp and his first wife, Melissa Lynn Henning-Camp (b. October 7, 1979), were married on October 21, 2000. She was diagnosed with ovarian cancer and died on February 5, 2001, when he was 23 and she was 21. Some of his early songs reflect the emotional ordeal of her illness. "I Still Believe" was the first song he wrote after she died. "Walk by Faith" was written during their honeymoon. A film based on Camp's romance with Melissa, I Still Believe, was released in March 2020, with Camp's role being played by KJ Apa and the role of Melissa being played by Britt Robertson.

On December 15, 2003, he married Adrienne Liesching, former frontwoman for The Benjamin Gate. They have three children.

In March 2024, Camp underwent heart surgery to treat atrial fibrillation.

== In popular culture ==
He was played by New Zealand actor KJ Apa in the 2020 biographical musical film I Still Believe, which received mixed reviews.

== Discography ==
- Burden Me (2000)
- Stay (2002)
- Carried Me: The Worship Project (2004)
- Restored (2004)
- Live: Unplugged (2005)
- Beyond Measure (2006)
- Speaking Louder Than Before (2008)
- We Cry Out: The Worship Project (2010)
- Christmas: God With Us (2012)
- Reckless (2013)
- I Will Follow (2015)
- The Answer (2017)
- The Story's Not Over (2019)
- When You Speak (2021)
- Deeper Waters (2024)

== Awards and nominations ==
=== GMA Dove Awards ===
Year	Award	Result
2004	New Artist of the Year	Won
2004	Male Vocalist of the Year	Won
2004	Pop/Contemporary Recorded Song of the Year ("I Still Believe")	Nominated
2005	Male Vocalist of the Year	Won
2005	Rock Recorded Song of the Year ("Stay")	Won
2006	Artist of the Year	Nominated
2006	Male Vocalist of the Year	Nominated
2006	Pop/Contemporary Album of the Year (Restored)	Nominated
2006	Rock Recorded Song of the Year ("Lay Down My Pride")	Nominated
2007	Male Vocalist of the Year	Nominated
2007	Recorded Music Packaging of the Year (Beyond Measure)	Won
2007	Long Form Music Video of the Year (Live Unplugged)	Nominated
2008	Song of the Year ("Give You Glory")	Nominated
2008	Inspirational Recorded Song of the Year ("Give Me Jesus")	Nominated
2009	Male Vocalist of the Year	Nominated
2010	Male Vocalist of the Year	Nominated
2010	Pop/Contemporary Album of the Year (Speaking Louder Than Before)	Nominated
2011	Praise & Worship Album of the Year (We Cry Out: The Worship Project)	Nominated
2011	Recorded Music Packaging of the Year (We Cry Out: The Worship Project - Deluxe Edition)	Nominated
2012	Special Event Album of the Year (Music Inspired by The Story - Various Artists)	Won
2020	Song of the Year ("Dead Man Walking")	Nominated
2020	Pop/Contemporary Recorded Song of the Year ("Dead Man Walking")	Nominated
2020	Pop/Contemporary Album of the Year (The Story's Not Over)	Nominated
2026	Rock/Contemporary Recorded Song of the Year ("No Survivors")	Pending

=== Other ===
Year	Award	Result
2005	ASCAP Songwriter of the Year Award	Won
2006	ASCAP Songwriter of the Year Award	Won
2006	ASCAP Song of the Year ("Take You Back")	Won
2007	American Music Award for Favorite Contemporary Inspirational Artist	Nominated
2008	First Family Ambassador Award	Won
2008	ASCAP Songwriter of the Year Award	Won
2009	American Music Award for Favorite Contemporary Inspirational Artist	Nominated
2010	ASCAP Songwriter/Artist of the Year Award	Won
2010	Grammy Award for Best Pop/Contemporary Gospel Album	Nominated
2012	American Music Award for Favorite Contemporary Inspirational Artist	Nominated
2026	K-Love Fan Award for Song of the Year ("No Survivors")	Nominated
2026	K-Love Fan Award for Artist of the Year	Nominated
2026	K-Love Fan Award for Male Artist of the Year	Nominated

Awards
Preceded by Paul Colman Trio	GMA's New Artist of the Year; 2004	Succeeded by Building 429
Preceded by Michael W. Smith	GMA's Male Vocalist of the Year; 2004 - 2005	Succeeded by Chris Tomlin
Preceded by "Ammunition" from The Beautiful Letdown by Switchfoot	GMA's Rock Recorded Song of the Year "Stay" from Stay; 2005	Succeeded by "The Slam" from Welcome to Diverse City by tobyMac (featuring T-Bone)
