= Sanctus Real discography =

Christian Rock band discography

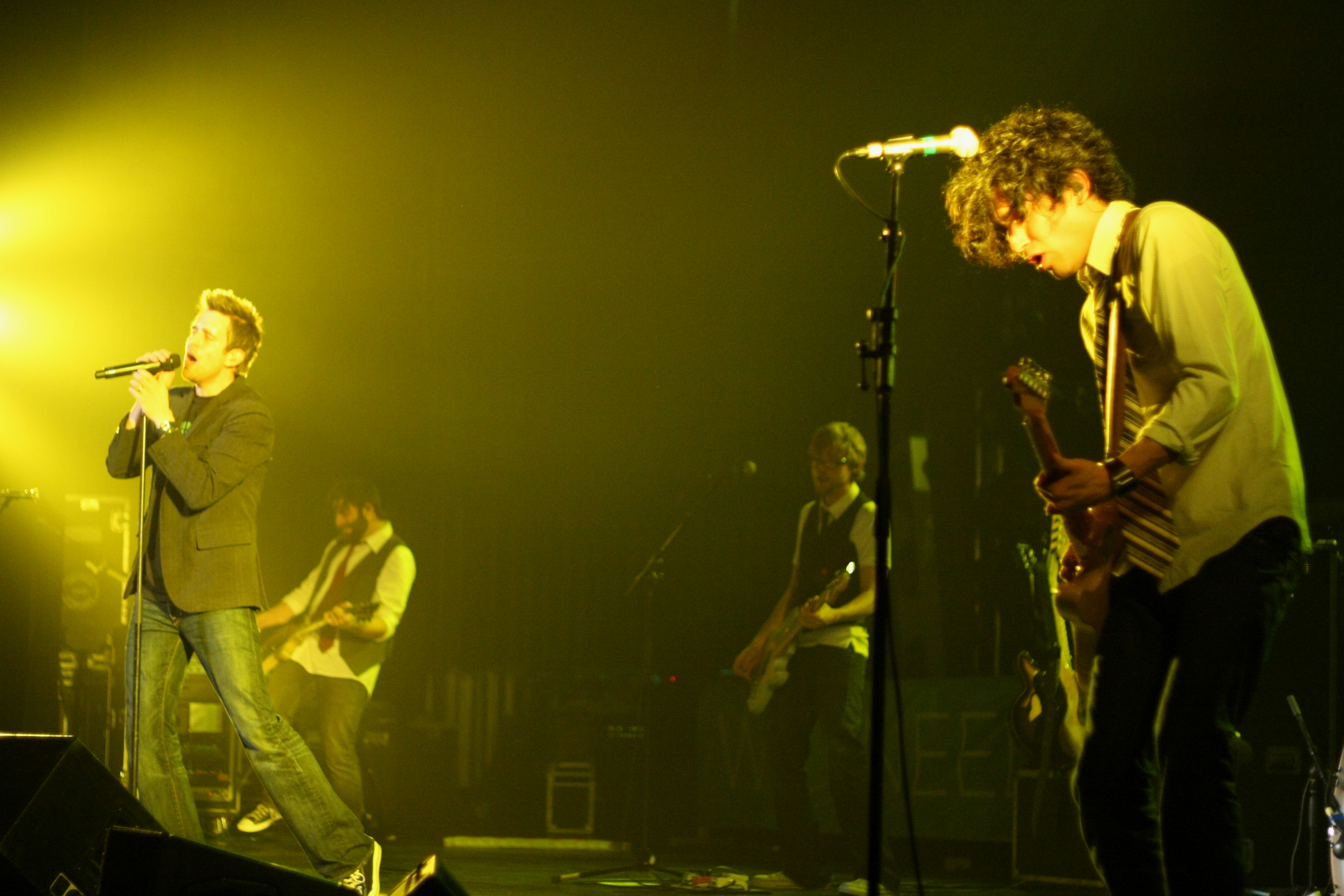
- Studio albums: 8
- Singles: 28
- Music videos: 10

The discography of Sanctus Real, a Christian rock band which formed in 1996.

== Albums ==
=== Studio albums ===
Title	Details	Peak chart positions		
Title	Details	US	US Christ.	US Heat
Say It Loud	Released: December 24, 2002; Label: Sparrow Records; Formats: CD, streaming	—	—	—
Fight the Tide	Released: June 15, 2004; Label: Sparrow; Formats: CD, streaming	—	23	38
The Face of Love	Released: April 4, 2006; Label: Sparrow; Formats: CD, streaming	158	10	2
We Need Each Other	Released: February 12, 2008; Label: Sparrow, EMI/Capitol CMG; Formats: CD, streaming	153	10	—
Pieces of a Real Heart	Released: March 9, 2010; Label: Sparrow; Formats: CD, streaming	76	4	—
Run	Released February 5, 2013; Label: Sparrow; Formats: CD, streaming	112	6	—
The Dream	Released: October 14, 2014; Label: Sparrow; Formats: CD, streaming	191	14	—
Changed	Released: April 27, 2018; Label: Framework Records; Formats: CD, streaming	—	— (Note: Changed did not enter the Top Christian Albums chart, but peaked at number 21 on the Christian Album Sales chart.)	—
Unstoppable God	Released: August 30, 2019; Label: Framework/Fair Trade Services; Formats: CD, streaming	—	42	—
All Along	Released: April 19, 2024; Label: Framework/The Fuel Music; Formats: CD, streaming	—	—	—
"—" denotes a recording that did not chart or was not released in that territory.

== Singles ==
Title	Year	Peak Chart Positions						Certifications	Album
Title	Year	US	US Rock	US Christ	US Christ Air	US Christ AC	US Christ Digital	Certifications	Album
"Say It Loud"	2002	—	—	—		—	—		Say It Loud
"Hey Wait"	2003	—	—	—		—	—		Say It Loud
"Audience of One"	2003	—	—	—		—	—		Say It Loud
"Beautiful Day"	2004	—	—	—		—	—		In the Name of Love: Artists United for Africa
"Everything About You"	2004	—	—	— (Note: "Everything About You" did not enter the Hot Christian Songs chart, but did peak at #1 on the Christian Contemporary Hit Radio chart.)		—	—		Fight the Tide
"Alone"	2004	—	—	—		—	—		Fight the Tide
"Things You Like"	2004	—	—	—		—	—		Fight the Tide
"The Fight Song"	2005	—	—	—		—	—		Fight the Tide
"Closer"	2005	—	—	25		—	—		Fight the Tide
"I'm Not Alright"	2006	—	—	— (Note: "Everything About You" did not enter the Hot Christian Songs chart, but did peak at #1 on the Christian Contemporary Hit Radio chart.)		—	—		The Face of Love
"The Face of Love"	2006	—	—	6		13	—		The Face of Love
"Don't Give Up"	2007	—	—	11		25	—		The Face of Love
"We Need Each Other"	2007	—	—	16		—	—		We Need Each Other
"Whatever You're Doing (Something Heavenly)"	2008	—	—	20		19	—		We Need Each Other
"Turn on the Lights"	2008	—	—	—		—	—		We Need Each Other
"Sing"	2008	—	—	—		—	—		We Need Each Other
"Forgiven"	2009	—	—	4		4	20		Pieces of a Real Heart
"Lead Me"	2010	— (Note: "Lead Me" did not enter the Billboard Hot 100, but peaked at No. 12 on the Bubbling Under Hot 100)	—	1		1	1		Pieces of a Real Heart
"Take Me Over"	2010	—	—	—		—	—		Pieces of a Real Heart
"The Redeemer"	2010	—	—	7		10	—		Pieces of a Real Heart
"Keep My Heart Alive"	2012	—	—	33		—	—		Pieces of a Real Heart
"Promises"	2012	—	—	11		13	37		Run
"Pray"	2013	—	—	20		24	34		Run
"Lay It Down"	2014	—	—	29	23	24	—		The Dream
"On Fire"	2015	—	—	23	22	—	44		The Dream
"Safe In My Father's Arms"	2017	—	—	—	38	—	—		Changed
"Confidence"	2018	—	17	10	7	3	13	RIAA: Platinum	Changed Unstoppable God
"Unstoppable God"	2019	—	—	22	16	18	—		Unstoppable God
"Today Tomorrow & Forever"	2020	—	—	—	—	—	—		Unstoppable God
"My God is Still the Same"	2021	—	—	6	3	5	—	RIAA: Gold	All Along
"Rebel"	2021	—	—	—	—	—	—		All Along
"Won't Let Me Go"	2022	—	—	44	23	—	—		All Along
"Dare to Hope"	2023	—	—	—	—	—	—		All Along
"All Along"	2023	—	—	—	—	—	—		All Along
"What Christmas Means to Me (Oh Holy Night)"	2023	—	—	—	—	—	—		Non-album singles
"Hope Begins"	2024	—	—	—	—	—	—		Non-album singles
"On the Mend"	2025	—	—	—	—	—	—		Non-album singles
"The Difference"	2025	—	—	—	—	—	—		Non-album singles
"You Are I Am"	2025	—	—	—	—	—	—		Non-album singles
"Steady"	2026	—	—	—	—	—	—		Non-album singles
"The War I'm In"	2026	—	—	—	—	—	—		Non-album singles
"Land of the Living" (with Jason Gray)	2026	—	—	—	33	—	—		Non-album singles
"Days Like These"	2026	—	—	—	—	—	—		Non-album singles
"—" denotes a recording that did not chart or was not released in that territory.

=== Promotional singles ===
Title	Year	Peak Chart Positions	Album
Title	Year	US Christ	Album
"This Love"	2016	—	This is Love EP
"Changed"	2017	—	Changed
"Jesus Loves You"	2019	—	Unstoppable God
"Lazarus"	2019	—	Unstoppable God
"A Million Ways"	2019	—	Unstoppable God
"—" denotes a recording that did not chart or was not released in that territory.

=== Other charted songs ===
Title	Year	Peak Chart Positions	Album
Title	Year	US Christ	Album
"Silent Night"	2007	13	—
"Shining"	2013	30	—
"Angels We Have Heard on High"	2014	46	—
"—" denotes a recording that did not chart or was not released in that territory.

== Music videos ==
Year	Song	Album	Ref.
2002	"Say It Loud"	Say It Loud	
2004	"Everything About You"	Fight the Tide	
2006	"I'm Not Alright"	The Face of Love	
2008	"Whatever You're Doing (Something Heavenly)"	We Need Each Other	
2010	"Forgiven"	Pieces of a Real Heart	
2010	"Lead Me"	Pieces of a Real Heart	
2012	"Promises"	Run	
2013	"Pray"	Run	
2016	"This Is Love"	This Is Love EP	
2018	"Confidence"	Changed	
2019	"Jesus Loves You"	Unstoppable God	
2019	"Lazarus"	Unstoppable God	
2019	"Unstoppable God"	Unstoppable God	
2020	"Today Tomorrow & Forever"	Unstoppable God	
2021	"Rebel"	Rebel	

== Compilation appearances ==
- 2004: In the Name of Love: Artists United for Africa – "Beautiful Day" (Sparrow)
- 2004: Veggie Rocks! – "Promised Land" (ForeFront)
- 2005: X2005 – "Everything About You", from Fight the Tide (BEC)
- 2005: X Worship 2006 – "Everything About You", from Fight the Tide (Worship Together)
- 2006: X2006 – "I'm Not Alright", from The Face of Love (BEC)
- 2006: X2007 – "Fly", from The Face of Love (BEC)
- 2006: WOW Hits 2007 – "I'm Not Alright", from The Face of Love (EMI)
- 2006: Unexpected Gifts (12 New Sounds of Christmas) – "Silent Night" (Sparrow)
- 2007: WOW Hits 2008 - "Don't Give Up", from The Face of Love (EMI)
- 2007: X Worship 2007 – "Eloquent", from The Face of Love (Worship Together)
- 2008: X Christmas – "Silent Night" (BEC)
- 2009: ConGRADulations! Class of 2009 – "We Need Each Other", from We Need Each Other (Interlinc)
- 2009: WOW Hits 2010 - "Whatever You're Doing (Something Heavenly)", from We Need Each Other (Word)
- 2010: WOW Hits 2011 - "Forgiven", from Pieces of a Real Heart (Word)
- 2010: WOW Hits 2011: Deluxe Edition - "I'm Not Alright (Broken-World Remix)", exclusive to the deluxe edition (Word)
- 2011: WOW #1s: Yellow - "I'm Not Alright", from The Face of Love (Word)
- 2011: X 2011 - "Take Over Me", from Pieces of a Real Heart (BEC)
- 2011: Courageous: Original Motion Picture Soundtrack - "Lead Me", from Pieces of a Real Heart
- 2011: WOW Hits 2012 - "Lead Me", from Pieces of a Real Heart (EMI)
- 2012: WOW Hits 2013 - "The Redeemer", from Pieces of a Real Heart (EMI)
- 2013: WOW Hits 2014: Deluxe Edition - "Pray", from Run (Capitol CMG)
- 2014: WOW Hits 2015: Deluxe Edition - "Lay It Down", from The Dream (Capitol CMG)
