= Pieces of Our Past: The Sanctus Real Anthology =

Compilation album by Sanctus Real
- Released: October 26, 2010
- Genre: Christian rock
- Label: Sparrow

Sanctus Real chronology
Pieces of a Real Heart (2010)	Pieces of Our Past: The Sanctus Real Anthology (2010)	Run (2013)

Pieces of Our Past: The Sanctus Real Anthology is a comprehensive, 34-song, 3-CD set including all the songs from Sanctus Real's albums We Need Each Other, The Face of Love, and Fight the Tide. The album explores the group's growth as musicians and songwriting with songs such as "We Need Each Other", "Everything About You", and "I'm Not Alright".

== Track listing ==
Pieces of Our Past track listing
No.	Title	Length
1.	"Everything About You"	4:06
2.	"The Fight Song"	3:39
3.	"Alone"	4:19
4.	"Things Like You"	4:02
5.	"Closer"	3:54
6.	"Change Me"	4:12
7.	"The Show"	3:56
8.	"Message"	3:31
9.	"Deeds"	3:08
10.	"You Can't Hide"	3:39
11.	"Where Will They Go"	3:26
12.	"Say Goodbye"	8:47
13.	"Everything About You" (Alternate Version)	6:22
14.	"I'm Not Alright"	4:07
15.	"Eloquent"	3:22
16.	"Fly"	3:58
17.	"The Face of Love"	3:55
18.	"Don't Give Up"	4:14
19.	"We're Trying"	3:00
20.	"Thank You"	3:34
21.	"Magnetic"	4:27
22.	"Possibilities"	3:30
23.	"Where We Belong"	3:34
24.	"Benjamin"	4:15
25.	"Turn On the Lights" (featuring Peter York)	3:28
26.	"We Need Each Other"	4:16
27.	"Black Coal"	3:26
28.	"Whatever You're Doing (Something Heavenly)"	4:11
29.	"Sing"	4:41
30.	"Leap of Faith"	3:17
31.	"Lay Down My Guns"	4:17
32.	"Eternal"	4:27
33.	"Half Our Lives" (featuring Zoe Harrison)	4:20
34.	"Legacy"	3:43
Total length:		136:33
