= Message for the Masses =

Message For the Masses

Studio album by Sanctus Real
- Released: 1999
- Genre: Christian Rock
- Length: 49:05
- Label: Independent
- Producer: Sanctus Real

Sanctus Real chronology
All This Talk of Aliens (1998)	Message For the Masses (1999)	Nothing to Lose (2001)

Message for the Masses is the second independent album recorded by Sanctus Real. It was released in 1999. Both the title track and "After Today" were re-recorded for the band's third independent album Nothing to Lose (2001), with the former track being re-titled "Message". "After Today" would later be re-recorded again for the album Say it Loud (2002), while "Message" was re-recorded again for the album Fight the Tide (2004).

== Track listing ==
1. "One of the Best" – 3:01
2. "Waiver" – 4:14
3. "Never Leave" – 2:44
4. "Free to Be" – 4:43
5. "Forever and a Day" – 4:01
6. "Remedy" – 4:49
7. "After Today" – 5:46
8. "Message for the Masses" – 4:18 – (early version of "Message")
9. "S.O.S." – 3:04
10. "Recognized" – 4:11
11. "So Long" – 5:45
12. "Coffee of Life" – 2:37

== Personnel ==
- Matt Hammit – Lead vocals, Rhythm guitar
- Chris Rohman – Lead guitars
- Mark Graalman – Drums and Percussion
- Matt Kollar – Bass

Production

- Recorded at Waveburner Studio
- Engineered & Mastered by Dalton Brand
- Produced by Sanctus Real
- Photography – Jim Rohman
- Graphic Art – Jeff Frye
- Cover – Matt Hammit
- Management – Jessica Lardinais
