= Savage Arena =

Multi-purpose arena in Toledo, Ohio

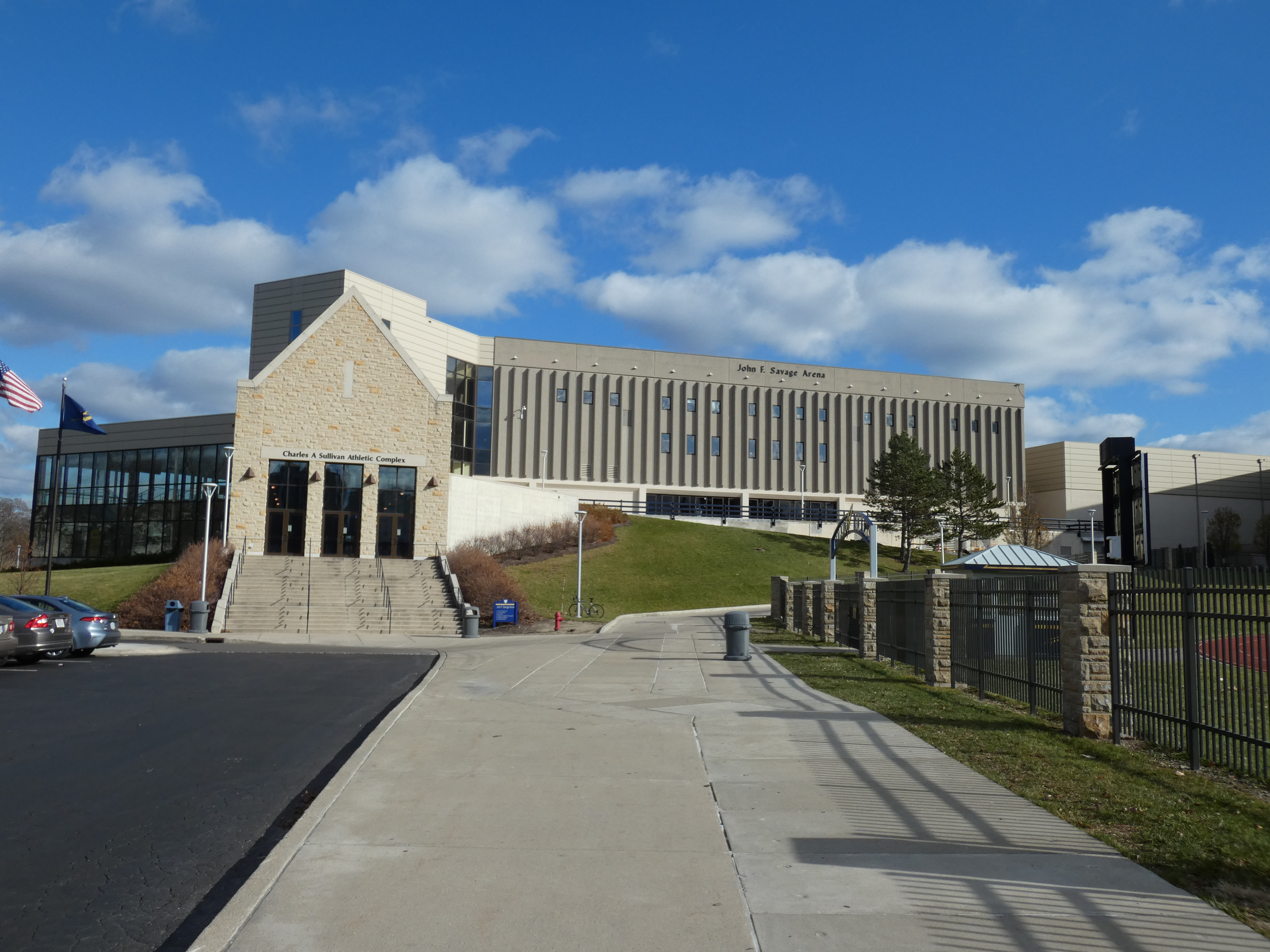
- Exterior view of the Sullivan Athletic Complex and Savage Arena
- Interactive map of Savage Arena
- Full name: John F. Savage Arena
- Former names: Centennial Hall (1976–88); John F. Savage Hall (1988–2008)
- Address: 2025 N Douglas Rd; Toledo, OH 43606
- Coordinates: 41.660232°N 83.609795°W
- Owner: University of Toledo
- Capacity: 7,014

Construction
- Opened: 1976
- Renovated: 2008
- Architect: SSOE + Ellerbe Becket (AECOM)

Tenant
- Toledo Rockets (NCAA) (1976–present)

Savage Arena (formerly John F. Savage Hall and Centennial Hall) is a multi-purpose arena located in Toledo, Ohio, on the campus of the University of Toledo.

The arena opened in 1976 and originally seated 9,000 for basketball and up to 10,000 for concerts. As part of a $30 million renovation and addition to the arena, completed in 2008, the seating capacity was reduced to 7,300 for basketball and up to 8,300 for concerts. It primarily serves as the home venue for the Toledo Rockets men's and women's basketball teams and women's volleyball team, and also hosts concerts, commencement exercises, and other events.

== Features ==
Savage Arena features 33,000 square feet (3,100 m^{2}) of space on its arena floor, large enough to accommodate an ice rink, an arena football field, a rodeo ring, five basketball courts, eight volleyball courts, five tennis courts, six racquetball courts, 22 badminton courts, and a 300-yard (274 m) indoor track. There is also a 48-by-56-foot (15 m × 17 m) portable stage. The Joe Grogan Room, which seats 200 for dinners, is located at the arena's south side, above the running track. The glass-enclosed room contains a lounge and a bar. More than $350,000 was spent on building and equipping the Joe Grogan Room. All funds for the room were raised through $5,000 pledges by members of the Rocket Club, the athletic department's main support group that now totals more than 1,000 members.

The arena is built with long span trusses that support the roof, 57 feet (17 m) above the arena floor. The trusses also support the arena's public address and ventilation systems, a catwalk system for service and maintenance, and the arena's center-court scoreboard. The arena is named for John F. Savage, a university alum (Class of 1952) who was instrumental in the arena's construction. The free span is 200 feet (61 m) from wall to wall. The building structure and wall systems are constructed of noncombustible material.

== Men's basketball ==
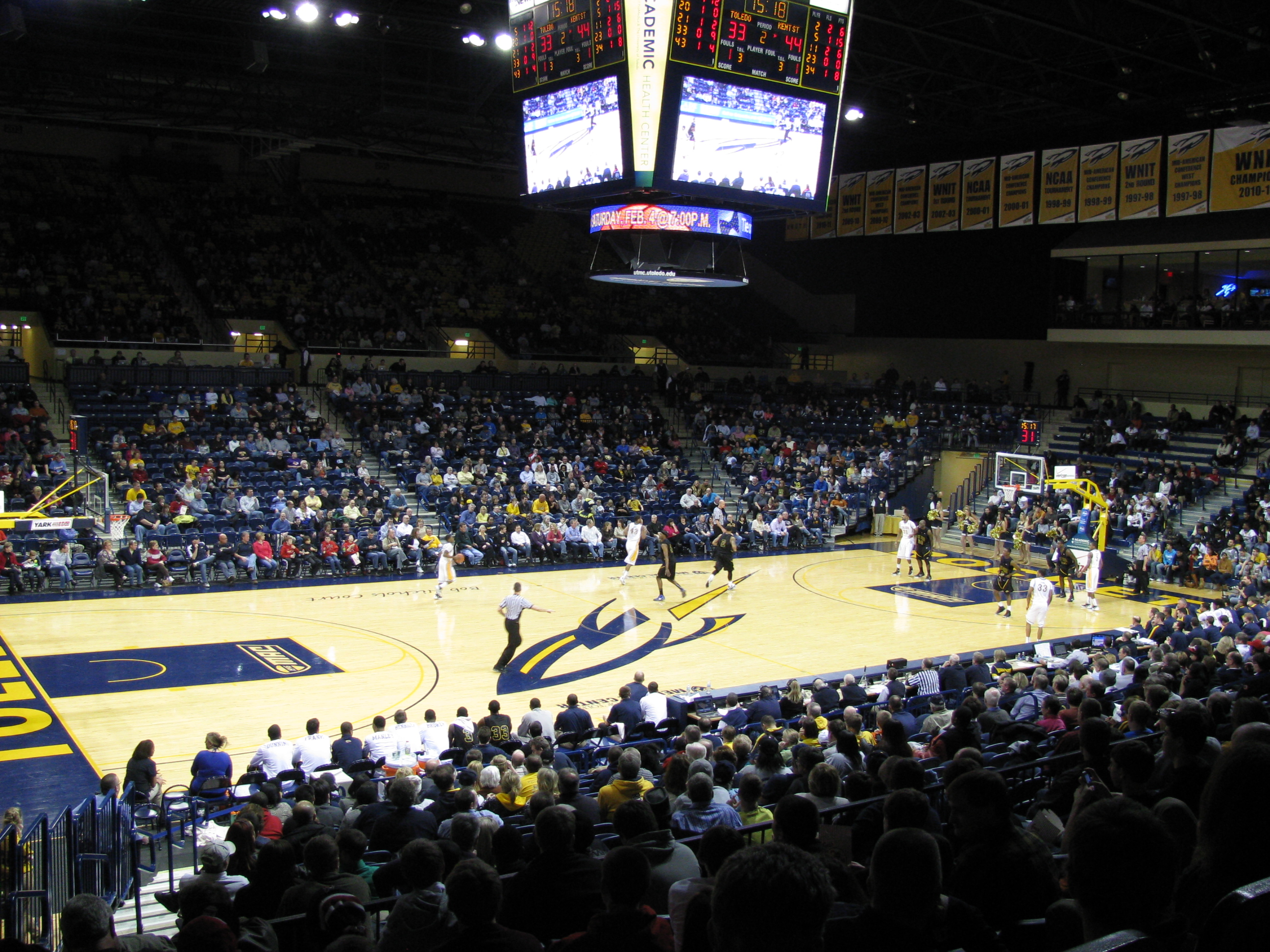
Interior of Savage Arena in 2012

In the first game played in Savage Arena, the men's basketball team defeated defending NCAA champion Indiana 59–57. With that win, the Rockets snapped Bobby Knight and the Hoosiers' 33-game winning streak. At Savage Hall, Toledo has beaten Ohio State, Xavier, Cincinnati, Houston and Pittsburgh. The longest consecutive winning streak by the Rockets in Savage Arena is 16 games, during the 1978–79 season. During that streak, UT outscored opponents by an average of 17 points per game. Between November 30, 1978 and December 1, 1981, the Rockets recorded a 45–3 (.938) home record. Prior to the 1985–86 season, they had lost back-to-back games at home only twice in 146 contests.

Toledo has won 73.5% of its games at home, posting a 312–112 record. During the first five years in Savage Arena, UT posted a 71–10 (.877) record, with a 15–1 mark in 1976–77 and 1978–79 and a 14–1 slate in 1979–80. Under former head coach Stan Joplin, the Rockets were 84–22 (.792) at Savage Arena. The Rockets have also ranked among the MAC leaders in attendance, averaging 6,640 fans per game since the arena opened in 1976. In 2004, Toledo led the MAC with an average attendance of 5,292.

In 1980–81, the Rockets set a school record with 147,203 in total attendance, the 30th-best total in the nation, and during the 1999–2000 season the Rockets eclipsed the 2.5 million attendance mark in arena history.

== Other uses ==
In addition to the activity areas, Savage Arena contains athletic department offices, a reception area, press room, sports medicine and therapy rooms, laundry and equipment facilities and locker rooms with showers and saunas for both men and women. It is also the site of convocations and commencement ceremonies, as well as the occasional conventions.

The facility has hosted five Mid-American Conference men's basketball tournaments: 1985, 1987–1989, and 1995. In addition, the arena hosted U.S. President George W. Bush and Mexican president Vicente Fox in 2001. World Championship Wrestling used Savage Arena as its Toledo stop until its 2001 folding, as would All Elite Wrestling in the late 2010s and early 2020s.

Among the many performers who have played Savage Arena over the years have been Bob Dylan, Elvis Presley, Frank Sinatra, Yes (band), Elton John, Fleetwood Mac, Boyz II Men, Steve Winwood, Rod Stewart, Phil Collins, Pearl Jam, Smashing Pumpkins, Sheryl Crow, Kenny Chesney, Tim McGraw, Red Hot Chili Peppers, Van Halen, Alabama, Charlie Daniels, The Judds, John Schneider and, more recently, Chris Brown, Katy Perry, The Black Keys, P!nk, Eric Church, American Idols Live!, Adele and Ariana Grande. Of note, Savage Arena hosted Crystal Bowersox's homecoming performance when it hosted the 2010 edition of the latter show. As part of their Promises Tour, the Christian rock band Sanctus Real had their homecoming concert at Savage Arena in 2013. Kiss performed at the arena during their 1997 Reunion Tour, a professionally shot recording of which has been widely bootlegged.

== Renovation ==
On July 17, 2006, a gift of $5 million, the largest single gift ever made to the UT athletic department, was donated and earmarked for use on the new Savage Hall update project. These funds were used along with those obtained in a capital raising campaign in order to make major repairs and upgrades to the facility, including an all new athletic center. Final plans included new locker rooms, weight rooms, a pro shop, a Rocket Hall-of-Fame, new ticket offices and a professional office area, as well as revamping of the main arena area which modernized every aspect of the Savage Hall experience. The complex was also renamed Savage Arena. The renovations, which totaled $30 million, were completed in time for the 2008-09 basketball season.

There are also plans in the works to attach an enclosed indoor practice complex for both the basketball and football teams.

== See also ==
- List of NCAA Division I basketball arenas
