= We Need Each Other =

We Need Each Other may refer to:

- We Need Each Other (album), 2008 album by Sanctus Real
  - "We Need Each Other" (song), song from the album
- We Need Each Other (film), 1944 Swedish film
