= This Is Love (EP) =

EP by Sanctus Real
- Released: February 5, 2016
- Genre: Christian pop; Christian rock; pop rock; worship
- Length: 12:24

Sanctus Real chronology
The Dream (2014)	This Is Love (2016)

This Is Love is the first extended play from Sanctus Real, and first release after the departure of lead singer Matt Hammitt, while they replaced him with Dustin Lolli. They released the EP on February 5, 2016, but this time without a label.

== Critical reception ==
Professional ratings
Review scores
Source	Rating
365 Days of Inspiring Media	4/5 stars
Jesus Freak Hideout	3.5/5 stars
New Release Today	4/5 stars

Awarding the album three and a half stars for Jesus Freak Hideout, Christopher Smith writes, "If This Is Love is any indication of the future for Sanctus Real, it looks promising." Jonathan J. Francesco, rating the album four stars from New Release Today, states, "Musically and creatively, Sanctus Real has managed to change lead singers and still sound incredibly good." Rating the album four stars at 365 Days of Inspiring Media, Jonathan Andre describes, "Well done Dustin and the band for such a lyrically rich set of 3 songs".

== Track listing ==
No.	Title	Length
1.	"This Is Love"	4:25
2.	"Find Me"	3:51
3.	"My Desire"	4:08
Total length:		12:24

== Personnel ==
- Dustin Lolli - Lead Vocals
- Chris Rohman - Guitars
- Mark Graalman - Drums
- Jake Rye - Bass Guitar, Backing Vocals
- Seth Huff - Keyboards, Backing Vocals
