= Pray (Sanctus Real song) =

Single by Sanctus Real

from the album Run
- Released: April 30, 2013
- Genre: Contemporary Christian music, Christian alternative rock, Christian rock
- Length: 3:56
- Label: Sparrow
- Songwriters: Matt Hammitt; Chris Rohman; Christopher Stevens
- Producer: Stevens

Sanctus Real singles chronology
"Promises" (2012)	"Pray" (2013)	"Lay It Down" (2014)

Music video
- "Pray" on YouTube

"Pray" is a song by the Christian rock band Sanctus Real from their sixth studio album, Run. Released on April 30, 2013, it served as the album's second single.[1] The song was chosen for the National Day of Prayer campaign.[2]

== Composition ==
"Pray" was written by Matt Hammitt, Chris Rohman and Christopher Stevens.

== Release ==
The song "Pray" was digitally released as the lead single from Run on April 30, 2013.

== Charts ==
=== Weekly charts ===
Chart (2013)	Peak position
US Christian AC (Billboard)	24
US Christian Airplay (Billboard)	20
US Hot Christian Songs (Billboard)	20
US Christian AC Indicator (Billboard)	18

=== Year-end charts ===
Chart (2013)	Peak position
US Christian Songs (Billboard)	49
