= Where We Belong =

Where We Belong may refer to:

== Books ==
- Where We Belong (novel), 2012 chick-lit novel by Emily Giffin
- Where We Belong, environmental book by Paul Shepard
- "Where We Belong, A Duet", poem by Maya Angelou from collection And Still I Rise

== Film ==
- Where We Belong, 2011 Ugandan film directed by Mariam Ndagire
- Where We Belong, 2019 Thai film directed by Kongdej Jaturanrasamee

== Music ==
- Where We Belong (album), 1998 album by Boyzone
- Where We Belong, 1990 album by Kenyan band Them Mushrooms
- Where We Belong, 2003 album by Swedish artist Rasmus Faber

=== Songs ===
- "Where We Belong" (song), 2010 song by UK band Lostprophets from the album The Betrayed
- "Where We Belong", 1999 single by Hot Water Music on the EP Moonpies for Misfits
- "Where We Belong", 2003 song by Westlife
- "Where We Belong", 2003 song by Rasmus Faber
- "Where We Belong", 2006 song by DeYarmond Edison
- "Where We Belong", 2007 song written by Kate Alexa from DNA Songs
- "Where We Belong", 2010 song by Thriving Ivory from Through Yourself & Back Again
- "Where We Belong", 2012 song by Devin Townsend from the album Epicloud
- "Where We Belong", 2013 song by Fedde le Grand and Di-rect
- "Where We Belong", song by Reuben Morgan and Joel Davies from the 2008 album This Is Our God
- "Where We Belong", song by Sanctus Real from album Pieces of Our Past: The Sanctus Real Anthology

== Theater ==
- "Where We Belong", a 2019 play by Madeline Sayet

== See also ==
- "Up Where We Belong", song by Joe Cocker and Jennifer Warnes in the 1982 film An Officer and a Gentleman
- "We All Go Back to Where We Belong, 2011 song by R.E.M.
- Where We All Belong, album by The Marshall Tucker Band
