= Lead Me =

Single by Sanctus Real

from the album Pieces of a Real Heart
- Released: March 5, 2010
- Genre: CCM, pop rock
- Length: 3:48
- Label: Sparrow
- Songwriters: Matt Hammitt; Jason Ingram; Chris Rohman

Sanctus Real singles chronology
"Forgiven" (2009)	"Lead Me" (2010)	"Take Over Me" (2010)

Music video
- "Lead Me" on YouTube

"Lead Me" is a song by American Christian rock band Sanctus Real from their 2010 album Pieces of a Real Heart. The song was written by Chris Rohman of Sanctus Real with Matt Hammitt and Jason Ingram. It was a big success staying nine consecutive weeks at the top of the US Billboard Christian Songs chart starting September 11, 2010, and until November 6, 2010, chart inclusive, staying a total of 52 weeks on the chart. The song is their highest-charting to date.

== Background ==
"Lead Me" was released on March 5, 2010, as the second single off their fifth studio album, Pieces of a Real Heart.

Sanctus Real lead guitarist, Chris Rohman, told the story about the song in an interview with "NewReleaseTuesday": "Our lead singer, Matt Hammitt, had most of the song written. It was written after Matt and his wife had a pretty gut-wrenching conversation, where she told him that she needed him to be a better spiritual leader to her and their family. It rocked Matt's world. They're the ones that have been married the longest in the band. They've been married longer than I have. They already have two daughters and they're expecting their third child right now. Matt said that he found it humbling that his wife would have the courage to say something like that out of love. Secondly, he realized that he had to do something about it. There was no way around it. We don't believe in divorce. There were some things they had to work on to keep that open dialogue between the two of them, so that they could admit problems and work through them. That's where the song came from. The idea is actually at least a year and a half old. We had a rough idea of the song because he had a demo, but it got put in the pile. The president of our record label somehow found the song before we completely finished the record and said, 'Something is going on with that song. I think it could really be turned into something special if you guys finish it.' Until he said that, we hadn't even entertained the thought of putting the song on the record. When we went in the studio to finish the song with this writer from Nashville, the story came together perfectly. The song is kind of a father's prayer for his family and wife. It's an honest cry out to God saying, 'If I'm going to lead my family, I need You to lead me.' I can say this because I didn't have a lot to do with it. I hope that hearing the story behind the song, and what went into writing it, will touch a lot of lives. It's a powerful song!"

== Music video ==
The music video for the single "Lead Me" was released on September 24, 2010. The video depicts a man who walks away from his family. Throughout the visual, he is motivated by God to return and look at his life. At the end, it shows the man returning to his home with his family there to welcome him.

== Track listing ==
- Digital download
1. "Lead Me" – 3:47
- Digital download (acoustic)
1. "Lead Me" – 3:45

== Charts ==
=== Weekly charts ===
Chart (2010)	Peak position
US Bubbling Under Hot 100 (Billboard)	12
US Christian AC (Billboard)	1
US Hot Christian Songs (Billboard)	1
US Christian AC Indicator (Billboard)	1
US Christian Soft AC (Billboard)	1
US Heatseekers Songs (Billboard)	15

=== Year-end charts ===
Chart (2010)	Peak position
US Christian Songs (Billboard)	8
Chart (2011)	Peak position
US Christian Songs (Billboard)	19

=== Decade-end charts ===
Chart (2010s)	Position
US Christian Songs (Billboard)	27
