= Active rock =

Radio format

Active rock is a radio format used by many commercial radio stations across the United States and Canada. Active rock stations play a balance of new hard rock songs with valued classic rock favorites, normally with an emphasis on the harder edge of mainstream rock and album-oriented rock.

== Format background ==
There is no concrete definition of the active rock format. Sean Ross, editor of Airplay Monitor, described active rock in the late 1990s as album-oriented rock (AOR) "with a greater emphasis on the harder end of the spectrum". Radio & Records defined the format as based on current rock hits in frequent rotation and targeted to males ages 18–34, akin to the approach of contemporary hit radio (CHR) stations.

An active rock station may include songs by classic hard rock artists whereas a modern rock or alternative station would not. Additionally, an active rock station will play a very popular demand in rotation of new hard rock and heavy metal artists as well as hard rock and heavy metal artists from the mid-1990s and throughout the 2000s. Usually an active rock station will play predominantly newer artists and songs, while other stations will play a balance of classic and new hard rock as close to home as possible to mainstream rock without overlapping the format.
