= Nothing to Lose (Sanctus Real album) =

Studio album by Sanctus Real
- Released: 2001
- Recorded: 2000–2001
- Length: 44:57
- Label: SpinAround Records
- Producer: Skidd Mills

Sanctus Real chronology
Message for the Masses (1999)	Nothing to Lose (2001)	Say It Loud (2003)

Professional ratings
Review scores
Source	Rating
Jesus Freak Hideout	4/5 stars

Nothing to Lose is the last independent album recorded by Sanctus Real before signing their record deal with Sparrow Records. It was released in 2001. The album was sold at live concerts in the Northwestern Ohio, Northern Indiana, and Southern Michigan areas. Six tracks were re-recorded for the album Say It Loud (2002). The song "Message" was re-recorded for the album Fight the Tide (2004).

== Track listing ==
Nothing to Lose
No.	Title	Length
1.	"Nothing to Lose"	3:33
2.	"Won't Walk Away"	3:51
3.	"Otherside"	3:28
4.	"Captain's Chair"	3:32
5.	"Inside Out" (early version of "Audience of One")	3:49
6.	"All I Want"	3:35
7.	"Overflow"	4:11
8.	"The Way You Wanted"	3:34
9.	"Message"	4:09
10.	"Craving"	5:21
11.	"After Today"	5:56
Total length:		44:57

== Personnel ==
- Matt Hammit – Vocals
- Chris Rohman – Guitars
- Mark Graalman – Drums
- Steve Goodrum – Bass

Production

- Skidd Mills – Production and Mixing
- Brad Blackwood – Mastering
- Jim Rohman Photography – Cover and Live Photos
- Chris Rohman – Design and layout
- Dan Weeks – Mechanical layout
