= Every Falling Tear =

Studio album by Matt Hammitt
- Released: September 13, 2011
- Genre: CCM, worship
- Length: 40:58
- Label: Sparrow
- Producer: Matt Hammitt

Every Falling Tear is the first studio album by contemporary Christian musician Matt Hammitt, released on September 13, 2011 by Sparrow Records.

== Critical reception ==
Professional ratings
Review scores
| Source | Rating |
|---|---|
| CCM Magazine (Matt Conner) | 4/5 stars |
| Christian Music Zine (Tyler Hess) | 3.5/5 stars |
| Christianity Today (Andy Argyrakis) | 3/5 stars |
| Indie Vision Music (Jonathan Andre) | 3/5 stars |
| Jesus Freak Hideout (Jerold Wallace) | 3.5/5 stars |
| Jesus Freak Hideout (Ryan Barbee) | 4/5 stars |
| Louder Than the Music (Jono Davies) | 4.5/5 stars |
| New Release Tuesday (Sarah Fine) | 5/5 stars |

CCM Magazine's Matt Conner said the album "hold[s] an intimate power and authenticity backed by Hammitt's already apparent melodic talents. It's a compelling package that's not easily shaken long after the last song is finished."

Christian Music Zine's Tyler Hess stated "there are songs out there that sound convoluted, but when it is known that the pain is real, that is when it is easiest to relate to and apply personally. When Hammitt sings his heart out, replacing grief with joy in the Lord Jesus Christ, that is when it is obvious that through the testing of fire, his faith has come out pure." In addition, Hess said "you don’t have to be going through a tragedy to appreciate what is happening here, though it is certain to cause great comfort to those who are."

Christianity Today's Andy Argyrakis alluded to how "the vulnerable storytelling will inspire those in similar situations."

Indie Vision Music's Jonathan Andre noted how "This is an album for solemn reflection and declaratory praise as we sing to a God who has everything in His hands."

Jesus Freak Hideout's Jerold Wallace evoked how this album left him with a "feeling reassured. Even the simple act of empathizing with Matt Hammitt's ordeal is painful, but his insistence that Christ will prevail is uplifting and encouraging. While the lyrics sometimes feel redundant, the strong emotional core and musical merit help balance things out."

Jesus Freak Hideout's Ryan Barbee called the album "proof that Jesus provides peace in the midst of the storm. Well done, Matt Hammitt."

Louder Than the Music's Jono Davies suggested Hammitt "put together an honest, raw, lyrical album, that will touch the hearts of whoever listens. A great set of songs on a stunning album."

New Release Tuesday's Sarah Fine referred to the album "as a 10 song progression from darkness to light. Beginning in the pit of the darkest valley, and ending at the sunrise of the highest mountain." Fine indicated the album "is a lyrical masterpiece, and by far some of Matt Hammitt’s strongest songwriting to date. I was blown away by the transparency found in these lyrics, and absolutely breath taken by how a song so simple could be so powerful. Musically, this isn’t the upbeat pop/rock style of music Sanctus Real fans have gotten used to over the years, but I think that’s what sets this project apart. This is hands down one of the top 10 Christian albums of the year and one longtime fans of the band and beyond will NOT want to miss. I speak for many when I say it has been a privilege to hear how the Hammitt family’s story has unfolded over this last year, and their continuing platform to bring hope to the hurting is sure to leave a legacy we won’t soon forget."

== Track listing ==
Every Falling Tear
| No. | Title | Writer(s) | Length |
|---|---|---|---|
| 1. | "All of Me" | Hammitt, Bernie Herms | 4:04 |
| 2. | "Holding You" | Hammitt, Jason Ingram, Peter Prevost | 3:59 |
| 3. | "Let Go" | Hammitt, Joy Williams | 3:36 |
| 4. | "Trust" | Hammitt, Ingram | 4:43 |
| 5. | "You Are My Treasure" | Hammitt, Ingram | 5:18 |
| 6. | "Without You" | Audrey Assad, Hammitt | 4:03 |
| 7. | "Let It Bring You Praise" | Hammitt, Ingram | 3:35 |
| 8. | "Little Light" (featuring Audrey Assad) | Assad | 3:05 |
| 9. | "I Couldn't Love You More" | Hammitt, Ingram | 4:09 |
| 10. | "This is Grace" | Hammitt, Ingram, Leeland Dayton Mooring | 4:29 |
| Total length: | | | 40:58 |

== Charts ==
=== Album ===
| Chart (2011) | Peak positions |
|---|---|
| US Billboard Christian Albums | 26 |
| US Billboard Heatseaker Albums | 29 |

=== Singles ===
| Year | Single | Peak chart positions |
| Year | Single | US Christian |
|---|---|---|
| 2011 | "All of Me" | 11 |
| 2011 | "Holding You" | — |
| 2011 | "Trust" | — |
| 2011 | "You Are My Treasure" | — |
