= All Along (album) =

Studio album by Sanctus Real
- Released: April 19, 2024
- Genre: Christian contemporary; Rock/pop; AC; Inspo
- Length: 38:44
- Language: English
- Label: Framework Records; The Fuel Music
- Producer: Chris Rohman; David Spencer; AJ Pruis; Josh Bronleewe; Tedd T.

Sanctus Real chronology
Unstoppable God (2019)	All Along (2024)

Singles from All Along
- 1. "My God is Still the Same" Released: March 5, 2021; 2. "Rebel" Released: August 6, 2021; 3. "How Many Times" Released: October 8, 2021; 4. "Won't Let Me Go" Released: September 30, 2022; 5. "Dare to Hope" Released: June 2, 2023; 6. "All Along" Released: October 13, 2023

All Along is the tenth studio album by American Christian rock band Sanctus Real. The album was released on April 19, 2024, through Framework Records/The Fuel Music.

== Background ==
As a predecessor to All Along, the Won't Let Me Go extended play was released, featuring five songs later included on the full album.

Sanctus Real stated about the album that the songs are "a testament to God’s faithfulness through it all."

Six songs from the album were released as singles, "My God Is Still the Same", "Rebel", "How Many Times", "Won't Let Me Go", "Dare to Hope", and "All Along". The song "My God Is Still the Same" reached No. 4 on the Billboard Hot Christian Songs chart, No. 2 on the Christian Airplay, and No. 2 on the Christian Adult Contemporary. "Won't Let Me Go" reached No. 49 on the Hot Christian Songs chart and No. 23 on the Christian Airplay chart.

== Critical reception ==
Professional ratings
Review scores
Source	Rating
365 Days of Inspiring Media	4/5 stars

Reviewing for 365 Days of Inspiring Media, Joshua Andre gave the album a 4-out-of-5 star review.

== Track listing ==
No.	Title	Writer(s)	Producer(s)	Length
1.	"When the Good Times End"	Chris Rohman; Corey Voss; Dustin Lolli; Mark Campbell	Chris Rohman	2:57
2.	"Won't Let Me Go"	Chris Rohman; David Spencer; Dustin Lolli	Chris Rohman; David Spencer	3:29
3.	"How Many Times"	AJ Pruis; Chris Rohman; Dustin Lolli; Mark Graalman	AJ Pruis	3:35
4.	"My God Is Still the Same"	Benji Cowart; Chris Rohman; Dustin Lolli; Josh Bronleewe	Josh Bronleewe	3:26
5.	"Victory"	David Spencer; Chris Rohman; Dustin Lolli	David Spencer	3:57
6.	"All Along"	AJ Pruis; Chris Rohman; Dustin Lolli	AJ Pruis	3:09
7.	"What He's Done Before"	Chris Rohman; Dustin Lolli; Rebekah White; Tedd T.	Tedd T.	3:51
8.	"Rebel"	David Spencer; Paul Duncan; Chris Rohman; Dustin Lolli	David Spencer	4:01
9.	"Used to Be"	AJ Pruis; Chis Rohman; Dustin Lolli; Mark Graalman	AJ Pruis	2:50
10.	"Dare to Hope"	David Spencer; Ethan Hulse; Chris Rohman; Dustin Lolli	David Spencer	3:33
11.	"Won't Let Me Go - Acoustic" (with Brennley Brown)	Chris Rohman; David Spencer; Dustin Lolli	David Spencer	3:53
Total length:				38:44
