= Forgiven (Sanctus Real song) =

Single by Sanctus Real

from the album Pieces of a Real Heart
- Released: October 23, 2009
- Genre: Alternative rock, power pop
- Length: 3:50
- Label: Sparrow
- Songwriter(s): Matt Hammit; Chris Rohman; Mark Graalman; Christopher Stevens; Peter Prevost; Dan Gartley
- Producer(s): Christopher Stevens, Jason Ingram, Rusty Varenkamp

Sanctus Real singles chronology
"Sing" (2008)	"Forgiven" (2009)	"Lead Me" (2010)

Music video
- "Forgiven" on YouTube

"Forgiven" is a song by American Christian rock band Sanctus Real, which was released to radio on October 23, 2009. The song is the first single from the band's fifth studio album Pieces of a Real Heart, which was released in March 2010. The song peaked at No. 4 on the US Hot Christian Songs chart, becoming their second Top 10 single from that chart. It stayed on the chart for 40 weeks, becoming their second longest charting song. The song is played in a D major key, and 82 beats per minute.

This song was also featured by the compilation album WOW Hits 2011.

== Background ==
"Forgiven" was released on October 23, 2009, as the first single off their fifth studio album, Pieces of a Real Heart. Sanctus Real's Matt Hammitt explained the meaning of the song: "The working-out of forgiveness is so key to our growth and maturity as followers of Jesus. The very idea that we have been forgiven for so much wrong moves, reforms, transforms and heals us. As we were framing 'Forgiven' around this concept, we realized that this was such a fundamental aim for all of us – to forgive and be forgiven." Sanctus Real lead guitarist Chris Rohman also gave his side of the story to NewReleaseTuesday,"It came out of an experience, as a band, where we just needed forgiveness from each other. We had no idea that when we released it to radio that it would have the effect that it did. We started a spot on our website where people could come and share stories about forgiveness. It was flooded by people opening up the deepest things they've struggled with in their lives - things that have effected them personally and also things that they've held against other people. This song has helped them to forgive. We put out a song that was personal to us, but others were able to deal with their own issues after hearing it. People wrote on the website, saying things like they were abused as a child and now they're able to forgive their father. It's deep! I would never have guessed that people would have that kind of connection with a song! It's pretty wild to read the stories people chose to share and, because there were so many, there's not one that really stands out."

== Music video ==
The music video was for single "Forgiven" was released on March 15, 2010. The music video was directed by Nathan Corona in late March.

== Track listing ==
CD release

1. "Forgiven" – 3:42
2. "Forgiven (Medium Key With Background Vocals)" – 3:40
3. "Forgiven (High Key Without Background Vocals)" – 3:40
4. "Forgiven (Medium Key Without Background Vocals)" – 3:40
5. "Forgiven (Low Key Without Background Vocals)" – 3:36
- Digital download
1. "Forgiven" – 3:36
- Digital download (Acoustic version)
1. "Forgiven" – 3:30

== Charts ==
=== Weekly charts ===
Chart (2010)	Peak position
R&R's Christian CHR format	1
US Christian AC (Billboard)	4
US Christian Airplay (Billboard)	4
US Christian Songs (Billboard)	4
US Christian AC Indicator (Billboard)	3

=== Year-end charts ===
Chart (2010)	Peak position
US Christian Songs (Billboard)	12
