= WOW Number 1s: Yellow =

WOW #1s: Yellow

Compilation album by Various artists
- Released: March 1, 2011
- Genre: CCM
- Length: 2:04:38
- Label: Word Distribution

WOW #1s compilation albums chronology
WOW #1s (2005)	WOW #1s: Yellow (2011)

Professional ratings
Review scores
Source	Rating
Allmusic	4/5 stars

WOW #1s: Yellow is a two-disc compilation album of 30 songs heralded as the biggest Christian hits of 2005-2010. It debuted at No. 9 on the Billboard Top Christian Albums chart. The Deluxe Edition featured 6 extra songs.

== Track listing ==
=== Disc one ===
1. "God with Us" - MercyMe
2. "Give Me Your Eyes" - Brandon Heath
3. "The Motions" - Matthew West
4. "Praise You in This Storm" - Casting Crowns
5. "Cry Out to Jesus" - Third Day
6. "The Words I Would Say" - Sidewalk Prophets
7. "There Will Be a Day" - Jeremy Camp
8. "Revelation Song" - Phillips, Craig and Dean
9. "Held" - Natalie Grant
10. "How Great Is Our God" - Chris Tomlin
11. "My Savior My God" - Aaron Shust
12. "I Am" - Mark Schultz
13. "Cinderella" - Steven Curtis Chapman
14. "Here I Am to Worship" - Michael W. Smith
15. "What Faith Can Do" - Kutless
16. "Brave" - Nichole Nordeman [Bonus Deluxe]
17. "Undo" - Rush of Fools [Bonus Deluxe]
18. "Stand In The Rain" - Superchick [Bonus Deluxe]

=== Disc two ===
1. "Never Going Back to Ok" - The Afters
2. "City on Our Knees" - TobyMac
3. "Free to Be Me" - Francesca Battistelli
4. "By Your Side" - Tenth Avenue North
5. "The Lost Get Found" - Britt Nicole
6. "Washed by the Water" - Needtobreathe
7. "The Last Night" - Skillet
8. "I'm Not Alright" - Sanctus Real
9. "I Need You to Love Me" - BarlowGirl
10. "This Is Your Life" - Switchfoot
11. "Me and Jesus" - Stellar Kart
12. "Every Time I Breathe" - Big Daddy Weave
13. "Hide" - Joy Williams
14. "Everlasting God" - Lincoln Brewster
15. "Everything You Ever Wanted" - Hawk Nelson
16. "Forgiven" - Relient K [Bonus Deluxe]
17. "All Along" - Remedy Drive [Bonus Deluxe]
18. "The Way to Begin" - Krystal Meyers [Bonus Deluxe]

== See also ==
- WOW series
