= Pieces of a Real Heart =

Studio album by Sanctus Real
- Released: March 9, 2010
- Recorded: 2009
- Studio: FabMusic (Franklin, Tennessee); The Smoakstack and Conservatory Park (Nashville, Tennessee)
- Genre: Contemporary Christian music, Christian rock
- Length: 39:16
- Label: Sparrow
- Producer: Christopher Stevens; Jason Ingram; Rusty Varenkamp

Sanctus Real chronology
We Need Each Other (2008)	Pieces of a Real Heart (2010)	Run (2013)

Pieces of a Real Heart is the fifth studio album from Christian rock band Sanctus Real. It was released on March 9, 2010, via Sparrow Records. The first single released was the song "Forgiven", which reached No. 6 on Billboard's Christian Songs chart. The second single "Lead Me" reached No. 1 on Billboard's Christian Music chart and was nominated for a GMA Dove Award.

According to lead vocalist and songwriter Matt Hammitt, the album title reflects the band's goal of striving to write honest songs. Hammitt once said in an interview, "These songs are pieces of the deepest part of who we are. Since we wrote 'I'm Not Alright' for our album The Face of Love, we have always strived to be really honest with what we are thinking and how it pertains to our faith and draws us closer to the Lord. I think now more than ever these songs are a great picture of what is going on underneath the surface with us."

== Track listing ==
Pieces of a Real Heart
No.	Title	Writer(s)	Length
1.	"Forgiven"	Dan Gartley, Mark Graalman, Matt Hammitt, Peter Prevost, Chris Rohman	3:37
2.	"These Things Take Time"	Gartley, Graalman, Hammitt, Prevost, Rohman, Christopher Stevens	3:21
3.	"The Way the World Turns"	Gartley, Graalman, Hammitt, Prevost, Rohman, Stevens	4:08
4.	"Lead Me"	Hammitt, Jason Ingram, Rohman	3:48
5.	"The Redeemer"	Gartley, Graalman, Hammitt, Prevost, Rohman, Stevens	3:45
6.	"Take Over Me"	Gartley, Graalman, Hammitt, Prevost, Rohman, Stevens	3:05
7.	"I Want to Get Lost"	Gartley, Graalman, Jason Gray, Hammitt, Prevost, Rohman	3:54
8.	"'Til I Got to Know You"	Ben Glover, Hammitt, Stevens	3:57
9.	"Dear Heart"	Hammitt, Rohman, Allen Salmon	3:01
10.	"I'll Show You How to Live"	Hammitt, Ingram, Prevost, Rohman	3:19
11.	"Keep My Heart Alive"	Glover, Hammitt, Rohman	3:26
Total length:			39:17

Special Edition bonus tracks
No.	Title	Length
12.	"Forgiven" (Acoustic)	3:29
13.	"These Things Take Time" (Acoustic)	3:33
14.	"Lead Me" (Acoustic)	3:45
15.	"I Want to Get Lost" (Acoustic)	4:27
16.	"'Til I Got to Know You" (Acoustic)	3:39

== Personnel ==
Adapted from the liner notes.

Sanctus Real

- Matt Hammitt – vocals, guitars
- Pete Provost – guitars, banjo
- Chris Rohman – guitars, mandolin
- Dan Gartley – bass
- Mark Graalman – drums

Additional musicians

- Christopher Stevens – keyboards (1–3, 5–8, 11), programming (1–3, 5–8, 11)
- Darren King – keyboards (9), programming (9)
- Zach Casebolt – strings (1, 5, 11)
- Claire Indie – strings (1, 5, 11)

Kids Choir on "The Way the World Turns"

- Kelli Harrah, Krista Harris, McKenzie Henderson, Tim Henderson, Memorie Johnston, Cheyanne Jones, Sierra Kelly, Melanie Kronick, Makenzee Lady, Caleb Losh, Al Lowe, Micah Lucas, Jess Manchester, Brittany Mann, Linda May, Grace Mercer, Jessica Moe, Sierra Mottola, Katie Parson, Sunshine Pearson, Wesley Phillips and Kyle Scott

== Production ==
- Christopher York – A&R
- Christopher Stevens – producer (1–3, 5–9, 11), engineer (1–3, 5–9, 11), mixing (1–3, 5–9, 11)
- Jason Ingram – producer (4, 10)
- Rusty Varenkamp – producer (4, 10), recording (4, 10)
- Paul Moak – engineer (1–3, 5–9, 11)
- Josh Silverberg – assistant engineer (1–3, 5–9, 11)
- Taylor Stevens – assistant engineer (1–3, 5–9, 11)
- Thomas Toner – assistant engineer (4, 10)
- Bob Boyd – mastering at Ambient Digital (Houston, Texas)
- Jess Chambers – A&R administration
- Crystal Varenkamp – production assistant (4, 10)
- Jan Cook – creative direction
- Lee Floyd – cover artwork
- Tec Petaja – photography
- Katie Moore – art direction, layout
- Jesse Hall – hair stylist, make-up
- Talitha Moak – wardrobe styling
- Matt Balm – management

== Charts ==
Chart	Peak position
Billboard 200	110

== Accolades ==
The album was nominated for a Dove Award for Rock/Contemporary Album of the Year at the 42nd GMA Dove Awards, while the song "Lead Me" was nominated for Song of the Year and Pop/Contemporary Recorded Song of the Year.
