= Don't Give Up (Sanctus Real song) =

Single by Sanctus Real

from the album The Face of Love
- Released: 2007
- Recorded: 2005
- Genre: Pop rock
- Length: 4:15
- Label: Sparrow
- Songwriters: Sanctus Real, Christopher Stevens
- Producer: Christopher Stevens

Sanctus Real singles chronology
"The Face of Love" (2006)	"Don't Give Up" (2007)	"We Need Each Other" (2007)

"Don't Give Up" is a song by Christian rock band Sanctus Real from their 2006 album The Face of Love. The song was released as the third radio single in early 2007, and reached No. 1 on R&R's Christian CHR chart in the beginning of May 2007. It is the band's fifth No. 1 hit, and the second chart-topping single from The Face of Love. It ended 2007 as the 6th most played song of the year on Christian contemporary hit radio. The song peaked at No. 11 on the Hot Christian Songs chart. It lasted 20 weeks on the overall chart. The song is played in a D-flat major key, and 120 beats per minute.

== Background ==
"Don't Give Up" is a rock-based song which encourages the longevity of marriage relationships. Lead singer Matt Hammit said: "The song was inspired by close friends of ours that made difficult decisions to end their marriages. I'm not here to judge those decisions, but as a band we want to be a voice for lasting love and commitment in a world where breaking vows is as common as taking them."

The song has been compared to U2's "Beautiful Day" and Coldplay's "Speed of Sound", having similarities in style to the band's previous album, Fight the Tide.

== Charts ==
=== Weekly charts ===
Chart (2007)	Peak position
US Christian AC (Billboard)	25
US Christian Airplay (Billboard)	11
US Hot Christian Songs (Billboard)	11
US Christian AC Indicator (Billboard)	18

=== Year-end charts ===
Chart (2007)	Peak position
US Christian Songs (Billboard)	27
