= The Face of Love (album) =

Studio album by Sanctus Real
- Released: April 4, 2006
- Recorded: 2005
- Studios: Fabmusic (Franklin, Tennessee); The Smoakstack (Nashville, Tennessee).
- Genre: Christian rock
- Length: 42:04
- Label: Sparrow/EMI CMG
- Producer: Christopher Stevens

Sanctus Real chronology
Fight the Tide (2004)	The Face of Love (2006)	We Need Each Other (2008)

Singles from The Face of Love
- 1. "I'm Not Alright" Released: February 21, 2006; 2. "The Face of Love" Released: 2007; 3. "Don't Give Up" Released: 2007

The Face of Love is the third studio album from Christian rock band Sanctus Real. It was released on April 4, 2006 and peaked at number 158 on the Billboard 200. The singles "I'm Not Alright" and "Don't Give Up" both reached number 1 on Christian contemporary hit radio. The album was written and recorded following a period of personal struggles for the band members, and carries themes of honesty and brokenness.

The Face of Love was generally well received by music critics, who praised its lyrical maturity and vocal performance of lead singer Matt Hammit. The album itself was GMA Dove Award-nominated for Rock/Contemporary Album of the Year, and the song "I'm Not Alright" also received a Dove Award nomination.

== Background ==
Before recording their third major studio album, the members of Sanctus Real faced several personal struggles including family deaths. In early February 2005, drummer Mark Graalman and his wife had a child, and on the same day, Graalman received news of his father's failing health due to cancer. Within two months his father and lead vocalist Matt Hammit's grandmother died, and the band's bassist left the group. Hammit said in an interview, "It basically left [us] feeling pretty confused about what was next for Sanctus Real, what kind of record we were going to make and how it was even going to happen." The album's final track, "Benjamin", was written to Graalman's infant son in relation to the father's death.

The band had difficulty in attempting to prepare and record an album following the circumstances at that time. Producer Christopher Stevens encouraged them to write honest songs about the pain that they had experienced, and was credited by the band members as "walking with them through their dark night of the soul experience".

The first recording session occurred in April 2005 in the garage of Stevens' Nashville, Tennessee home, which was used as a temporary studio. "It was so hot in that garage the first session", guitarist Chris Rohman recalled in an interview. "We go in there and we don't have the songs, we don't know what we're doing, we're stressed, he's stressed, and it's like 90 degrees [Fahrenheit] in the studio. Nobody wanted to be there." Stevens began playing over the chords to "I'm Not Alright", initially titled as "I'll Be Fine", and at that point the band decided to rework the song's lyrical theme. "We're not going to lie. We're not going to try to sit here and try to sugarcoat what's happening right now or say something because it sounds good. I'm not alright", Matt Hammit said. The previous material they had written was lyrically "shifted to the stuff we were going through at [that] point". "I'm Not Alright", which became the album's lead single, was rewritten and represented the themes of brokenness and confession on The Face of Love. Mark Graalman noted: "It's been an unbelievably hard year for the band. But we've learned to rely on God’s grace, and we've learned to be honest and transparent. Being honest and transparent means not faking it; it has to be OK to say, 'No, I'm not alright'."

The Face of Love was recorded and mixed at the fabmusic and Smoakstack studios in Tennessee.

== Musical style ==
The Face of Love has generally been labeled as a melodic alternative rock album, taking influence from the power pop of their debut Say It Loud and the more distinctive rock sound of Fight the Tide. Allmusic's review noted, "If you swirled together Switchfoot's The Beautiful Letdown, Jars of Clay's Good Monsters and U2's How to Dismantle An Atomic Bomb, the concoction would sound much like this."

== Release and promotion ==
The Face of Love was released on April 4, 2006 through Sparrow Records and Capitol Music Group. It debuted at number 168 on the Billboard 200, and number 2 on Billboard magazine's Top Heatseekers chart. It also reached number 10 on Billboard's Top Christian Albums chart, and in December 2006, the album re-entered the Billboard 200 and placed at number 158.

Three radio singles were released from the album: "I'm Not Alright", "The Face of Love", and "Don't Give Up". On April 23, 2006, the band launched The Face of Love Tour in promotion of the album; it travelled through the southeast and midwest of the United States, featuring Needtobreathe and This Beautiful Republic as guest artists.

=== Reception ===
Professional ratings
Review scores
Source	Rating
Allmusic	link
Jesus Freak Hideout	link
Christianity Today	link
Cross Rhythms	link
Music Faith	link
The Phantom Tollbooth	(not rated) link

Upon its release, The Face of Love was generally well-received by music critics. Jared Johnson of Allmusic gave a 4.5/5 review, praising Matt Hammit's lead vocals as "so rich and mature that he could practically sing a computer owner's manual to rave reviews"; it was also labeled by Allmusic as an AMG Album Pick. The title track "The Face of Love" received individual accolade, as well: Jesus Freak Hideout main editor John DiBiase called it "probably the band's best [song] to date", while Christianity Today said that it was a "beautiful illustration". The album was noted to somewhat "lack distinction" by Christianity Today, however; the magazine's review noted, "Based on the songwriting, this is Sanctus Real's most mature effort to date ... Though it all sounds great, there's ultimately something a little lacking ... [W]hile there is indeed growth here, it doesn't necessarily make The Face of Love a step forward in excellence compared to the band's two previous efforts."

The Face of Love was nominated for the Rock/Contemporary Album of the Year honor at the 2007 GMA Dove Awards. The album's lead single "I'm Not Alright" also received a Dove Award nomination, in the category Rock/Contemporary Recorded Song of the Year.

== Track listing ==
The Face of Love
No.	Title	Writer(s)	Length
1.	"I'm Not Alright"	Dan Gartley, Mark Graalman, Matt Hammitt, Doug McKelvey, Chris Rohman, Christopher Stevens	4:07
2.	"Eloquent"	Gartley, Graalman, Hammitt, Rohman, Stevens	3:22
3.	"Fly"	Gartley, Graalman, Hammitt, Rohman, Stevens	3:58
4.	"The Face of Love"	Gartley, Graalman, Hammitt, Rohman, Stevens	3:55
5.	"Don't Give Up"	Gartley, Graalman, Hammitt, Rohman, Stevens	4:14
6.	"We're Trying"	Gartley, Graalman, Hammitt, Rohman	3:00
7.	"Thank You"	Gartley, Graalman, Hammitt, Rohman, Stevens	3:34
8.	"Magnetic"	Gartley, Graalman, Hammitt, Rohman, Stevens	4:27
9.	"Possibilities"	Gartley, Graalman, Hammitt, Rohman, Stevens	3:30
10.	"Where We Belong"	Gartley, Graalman, Hammitt, Rohman, Stevens	3:34
11.	"Benjamin"	Gartley, Graalman, Hammitt, Rohman, Stevens	4:15
Total length:			41:56

== Personnel ==
Sanctus Real

- Matt Hammitt – all vocals
- Chris Rohman – guitars
- Dan Gartley – bass
- Mark Graalman – drums

Additional musicians

- Christopher Stevens – acoustic piano, Wurlitzer electric piano, synthesizers, Moog synthesizer
- Paul Moak – acoustic piano, Moog synthesizer, guitars

== Production ==
- Christopher York – A&R
- Christopher Stevens – producer, recording, mixing
- Paul Moak – recording
- Hank Williams – mastering at MasterMix (Nashville, Tennessee)
- Holly Meyers – A&R administration
- Jess Chambers – A&R administration
- Dave Hill – photography
- Jan Cook – creative direction
- Alexis Goodman – art direction
- Benji Peck – design, illustration
- Mark Anderson – touring manager
- Keith Shackleford – personal manager

== Charts ==
=== Album ===
Year	Chart	Peak position
2006	U.S. Billboard 200	158
2006	U.S. Billboard Top Heatseekers	2
2006	U.S. Billboard Top Christian Albums	10

=== Singles ===
Year	Single	Chart	Peak position
2006	"I'm Not Alright"	U.S. R&R Christian CHR format	1
2007	"Don't Give Up"	U.S. R&R Christian CHR format	1
