= We Need Each Other (album) =

Studio album by Sanctus Real
- Released: February 12, 2008
- Recorded: 2007
- Studio: FabMusic (Franklin, TN); The Smoakstack (Nashville, TN).
- Genre: Christian rock, CCM, pop rock, indie rock, folk rock
- Length: 40:06
- Label: Sparrow/EMI CMG
- Producer: Christopher Stevens

Sanctus Real chronology
| The Face of Love (2006) | We Need Each Other (2008) | Pieces of a Real Heart (2010) |

Singles from We Need Each Other
- 1. "We Need Each Other" Released: 2007; 2. "Whatever You're Doing (Something Heavenly)" Released: 2008; 3. "Turn On the Lights" Released: 2008; 4. "Sing" Released: 2008

Professional ratings
Review scores
| Source | Rating |
|---|---|
| AllMusic | 4/5 stars |
| Christianity Today | 4.5/5 stars |
| Jesus Freak Hideout | 4.5/5 stars |
| Evade the Noise | 3.5/5 stars |

We Need Each Other is the fourth album released by Christian rock band Sanctus Real. It was released in the United States on February 12, 2008 through Sparrow Records. It debuted at #153 on the Billboard 200. Three songs have been released as singles: "Whatever You're Doing (Something Heavenly)", "Turn On the Lights", and the title track "We Need Each Other".

== Background ==
We Need Each Other was recorded over a few months in 2007, beginning in the middle of the year. The album's name had not yet been decided in late August 2007, but in early November the working title was announced as Turn On the Lights. However, by December 2007 the title was solidified as We Need Each Other.

Christopher Stevens produced We Need Each Other as he had also done with band's previous release The Face of Love. Lead singer Matt Hammitt explained that the album's title represents its general theme. "There's a longing for something bigger than oneself, a band, a song or a crowd of concertgoers. We need to come together as the body of Christ, unifying to see God’s work done through us. There’s so much simple truth in the statement, 'we need each other.' We can accomplish so much more if we stand together as one."

Two musicians guested on two of the songs from We Need Each Other. It was the first Sanctus Real album to feature appearances from other musicians outside the band. Singer Katie Herzig appeared on the song "Half Our Lives", singing a lead duet with Matt Hammitt. Guitarist Peter York recorded the distinct guitar riffs for the track "Turn On the Lights". Sanctus Real guitarist Chris Rohman has said that "Peter 'tore it up' in the studio and it turned out great! It's a highlight on the album".

== Release ==
The album's first single, title track "We Need Each Other", was released on November 12, 2007. It began increasing in radio airplay during December 2007, and in February 2008, the song stayed at number 1 for three weeks on R&R's Christian contemporary hit radio chart. The album itself was then released on February 12, 2008 and debuted at #153 on the Billboard 200, becoming the band's highest charting album to date on the 200 chart.

The album's second single, "Whatever You're Doing (Something Heavenly)" was released in May 2008. A music video for the song debuted in the beginning of June 2008 and was filmed about a month earlier. The third radio single "Turn On the Lights" was released in August 2008.

We Need Each Other went on to receive a Grammy Award nomination for Best Rock Gospel Album.

== Track listing ==
We Need Each Other
| No. | Title | Writer(s) | Length |
|---|---|---|---|
| 1. | "Turn On the Lights" (featuring Peter York) | Mark Graalman, Matt Hammitt, Chris Rohman, Christopher Stevens | 3:28 |
| 2. | "We Need Each Other" | Graalman, Hammitt, Rohman, Stevens | 4:16 |
| 3. | "Black Coal" | Graalman, Hammitt, Rohman, Stevens | 3:26 |
| 4. | "Whatever You're Doing (Something Heavenly)" | Graalman, Hammitt, Rohman | 4:11 |
| 5. | "Sing" | Graalman, Hammitt, Rohman, Stevens | 4:41 |
| 6. | "Leap of Faith" | Graalman, Hammitt, Rohman, Stevens | 3:17 |
| 7. | "Lay Down My Guns" | Graalman, Hammitt, Douglas Kaine McKelvey, Rohman | 4:17 |
| 8. | "Eternal" | Graalman, Hammitt, Rohman | 4:27 |
| 9. | "Half Our Lives" (featuring Katie Herzig) | Graalman, Hammitt, Rohman | 4:20 |
| 10. | "Legacy" | Graalman, Hammitt, Rohman, Stevens | 3:43 |
| Total length: | | | 40:06 |

== Personnel ==
Sanctus Real

- Matt Hammitt – vocals
- Pete Provost – guitars, lap steel guitar
- Chris Rohman – guitars, mandolin
- Dan Gartley – bass, accordion, backing vocals
- Mark Graalman – drums

Additional musicians

- Christopher Stevens – programming, keyboards
- Peter York – lead guitar (1)
- Paul Moak – guitars, glockenspiel
- Katie Herzig – vocals (8, 9)

Gang vocals on "Black Coal"

- Matt Hammitt, Christopher Stevens and Taylor Stevens

Crowd vocals on "Sing"

- Megan Conner and Christopher Stevens

== Production ==
- Christopher York – A&R
- Christopher Stevens – producer, engineer, mixing
- Paul Moak – engineer
- Kevin Powell – assistant engineer
- Hank Williams – mastering at MasterMix (Nashville, Tennessee)
- Jess Chambers – A&R administration
- Jan Cook – creative director
- Jeremy Cowart – photography
- Josh Byrd – art direction
- Kate Moore – cover design
- Benji Peck – package design
