= Billboard Radio Monitor =

American music trade publication

- Cover for the final issue of Billboard Radio Monitor
- Categories: Trade magazine
- Frequency: Weekly
- Founded: January 9, 1993
- Final issue: July 14, 2006
- Company: Billboard
- Country: USA
- Language: English
- Website: www.billboardradiomonitor.com (as of June 15, 2006)
- ISSN: 1556-7338

Billboard Radio Monitor was a weekly music trade publication that followed the radio industry and tracked the monitoring of current songs by format, station and audience cumes. The magazine was a spinoff of Billboard magazine and was mostly available through subscription to people who worked in the radio industry as well as music chart enthusiasts. It was developed in Columbia, Maryland, initially by Alan Smith and Jonas Cash, principals of the music company called AIR. AIR created music listening competitions for radio programmers in five different musical genres and were looking for a "qualifier" for the contests. The contests involved testing new songs' potential by having radio programmers listen to and respond to each song's hit potential using a national chart as the qualifier. After using Radio and Records chart for the first 10 years of the competition, AIR developed the BAM, and went into partnership with Billboard Magazine to produce and market the magazine. As members of the Board of Directors, the AIR principals continued to improve its features over the next eight years under the new name of Billboard Radio Monitor.

It started out in 1993 as one 8-page publication covering Top 40, Rhythm 40, Crossover, Urban, AC, Hot AC, Rock, Alternative and Country formats. Eventually, four different publications under the Airplay Monitor title appeared and became the #1 source of hit music information. They were combined in 2001 and later changed their name to Billboard Radio Monitor in 2003. On July 14, 2006, publication ceased and was relaunched under the Radio & Records banner on August 11, 2006. The move was a result of a merger between the current R&R and Radio Monitor after VNU Media acquired R&R on July 6, 2006. The relaunched R&R would later cease publication on June 5, 2009.

== History ==
Prior to 1993, the radio stations playlists and radio music charts were featured in Billboard. But with the addition of monitored airplay from Nielsen Broadcast Data Systems in 1990 and the fragmentation of music formats, the need for a magazine that would focus on one format would come to the forefront. That move resulted in the spinoff of Airplay Monitor, a publication that would the monitor songs or tracks being played on radio station by the number of spins, which in turn are added and tabulated to the corresponding chart the station reports to. The charts and the number of spins featured on the chart are also used to factor in the main Billboard Hot 100 chart, as well as the Hot 100 Airplay, Pop 100, Pop 100 Airplay, Hot R&B/Hip-Hop Singles & Tracks and Hot Country Singles & Tracks music charts.

== Airplay Monitor (1993-2003) ==
At the start of Airplay Monitor's first issue on January 9, 1993, the publication was available in four editions, which would last until 2001, when they were consolidated into one publication as Airplay Monitor:

- Top 40 Airplay Monitor
  - Mainstream Top 40
  - Rhythmic Top 40 (originally Top 40 Rhythm-Crossover from 1993 to 1997)
  - Crossover (1997–2002)
  - Adult Contemporary
  - Adult Top 40
  - Modern Adult
- R&B Airplay Monitor
  - Mainstream R&B
  - Adult R&B
  - Rap (based on playlists from both Rhythmic Top 40 and Mainstream R&B reporters)
- Rock Airplay Monitor
  - Active Rock
  - Heritage Rock
  - Mainstream Rock (combined playlists from Active and Heritage Rock)
  - Modern Rock
  - Triple-A
- Country Airplay Monitor
  - Country Tracks (based on airplay)

== Billboard Radio Monitor (2003-2006) ==
On January 6, 2003, just ten years after its debut, Billboard renamed the publication Billboard Radio Monitor. The change was to reflect to growing landscape of the radio industry as it began to incorporate more articles involving programmers, markets, formats and artists into the magazine. They also expanded the number of format airplay panels as well and in 2004 became the first music trade to include satellite and audio networks in its reporting panels.

The monitored radio panels are:

- Mainstream Top 40
- Rhythmic Top 40
- Dance airplay
- Adult Top 40
- Adult Contemporary
- R&B/Hip-Hop airplay
- Adult R&B airplay
- Rap airplay
- Country Airplay
- Modern Rock airplay
- Active Rock airplay
- Heritage Rock airplay
- Triple-A airplay
- Smooth Jazz airplay
- Contemporary Christian airplay
- Christian AC airplay
- Gospel airplay
- Latin Rhythm Airplay
- Latin Pop Airplay
- Regional Mexican Airplay
- Tropical/Salsa airplay

== Merger with Radio & Records ==
On July 6, 2006, VNU, the parent company of Billboard Radio Monitor, announced the acquisition of Radio & Records (R&R), which became a part of the Billboard Information Group a month later on August 1. R&R had been considered a rival to Billboard and BRM for more than 33 years (since 1973, the year R&R started) and like BRM also used radio airplay to determine chart activity.

In a statement on both R&R and Billboard Radio Monitor's websites:

"This acquisition is in line with VNU's strategy to further strengthen its services to the radio and record industries", said Michael Marchesano, president and CEO of VNU Business Media and Nielsen Entertainment. "With the added resources of VNU, especially our music services, including the Billboard Information Group, Nielsen BDS, and Nielsen SoundScan, R&R will continue to grow as a vibrant brand."

With the purchase of R&R it was announced on July 12, 2006, that their operations were integrated into R&R after the transition was completed, since both BRM and R&R's charts and radio reporting panels were identical to each other, thus resulting in Billboard Radio Monitor ceasing publication with its July 14 issue. However they continued issuing weekly charts and report on radio industry news online during the turnover, as R&R started integrating their articles and columns into the Billboard Information Group.

Once the merger was completed both trades was relaunched on August 11 under the "R&R" name, which combined the features and format articles from the current R&R but continues to use the same BDS charts and format reporting panels that was featured in Radio Monitor, starting with the week ending August 6. The change also ended R&R's partnership with Mediabase after the August 4, 2006 issue.

== Use in countdown shows ==
From January 9, 1993, up until its last first-run show on January 28, 1995, American Top 40 used the Top 40 Mainstream chart as its main source. From 1995 to 1997, Rick Dees Weekly Top 40 used this chart as its main source; it was still used as of 2005.

== See also ==
- Radio & Records
- R&R magazine
