= Everything About You (Sanctus Real song) =

Single by Sanctus Real

from the album Fight the Tide
- Released: Mid-2004
- Recorded: February–April 2004
- Genre: Alternative rock, power pop
- Length: 4:06
- Label: Sparrow Records
- Songwriter(s): Tjornhom, Matt Hammit, Chris Rohman, Steve Goodrum
- Producer(s): Tedd T

Sanctus Real singles chronology
"Beautiful Day" (2004)	"Everything About You" (2004)	"Alone" (2004)

"Everything About You" is a song by Christian rock band Sanctus Real from their second album Fight the Tide. It was released as a radio single in mid-2004 and reached number 1 on R&R magazine's Christian rock radio format by August. It held the top position for at least six consecutive weeks.

== Awards ==
On 2005, the song was nominated for a Dove Award for Rock Recorded Song of the Year at the 36th GMA Dove Awards.
