= Promises (Sanctus Real song) =

Single by Sanctus Real

from the album Run
- Released: October 9, 2012
- Genre: Christian Contemporary-Alternative-Rock
- Length: 3:22
- Label: Sparrow
- Songwriters: Mark Graalman; Matt Hammitt; Pete Prevost; Chris Rohman

Sanctus Real singles chronology
"Keep My Heart Alive" (2012)	"Promises" (2012)	"Pray" (2013)

Music video
- "Promises" on YouTube

"Promises" is a song by Christian Contemporary-Alternative-Rock band Sanctus Real from their sixth studio album, Run. It was released on October 9, 2012, as the first single from the album.

== Composition ==
"Promises" was written by Mark Graalman, Matt Hammitt, Peter Prevost and Chris Rohman, who are all band members of Sanctus Real.

== Release ==
The song "Promises" was digitally released as the lead single from Run on October 9, 2012.

== Charts ==
=== Weekly charts ===
Chart (2012)	Peak position
US Christian AC (Billboard)	4
US Christian Airplay (Billboard)	11
US Hot Christian Songs (Billboard)	11
US Christian AC Indicator (Billboard)	10

=== Year-end charts ===
Chart (2013)	Peak position
US Christian Songs (Billboard)	41
US Christian AC (Billboard)	41
US Christian CHR (Billboard)	16
