= Confidence (Sanctus Real song) =

Single by Sanctus Real

from the album Changed
- Released: February 23, 2018
- Recorded: 2017–2018
- Genre: Christian alternative rock, Christian rock, pop rock
- Length: 3:01
- Label: Framework, Provident Distribution
- Songwriters: Dustin Lolli; Chris Rohman; Ethan Hulse; Matt Armstrong
- Producers: Matt Armstrong; Sanctus Real

Sanctus Real singles chronology
"Safe In My Father's Arms" (2017)	"Confidence" (2018)	"Unstoppable God" (2019)

Music video
- "Confidence" on YouTube

"Confidence" is a song by American Christian rock band Sanctus Real. The song was released as the third single from their 2018 album Changed on February 23, 2018. The song peaked at No. 10 on the US Hot Christian Songs chart, becoming their fifth Top 10 single in over seven years. It also crossed over to the Hot Rock Songs chart, peaking at No. 17. The song is played in an A major key, and 167 beats per minute.

== Background ==
"Confidence" was released as the third single from their eighth studio album Changed. The song was released to Christian radio the same day. The band explained the meaning of the song in a video on their YouTube channel,“Confidence is a prayer. It’s a prayer to see the world selflessly. Not a prayer to be in the lion’s den but a prayer to have such unshakable faith in the kingdom of heaven that we are willing to go through dangerous things.Moses never made it to the promise land. He only was able to view it, but his hope was in God’s plan for God’s people. The plan that he contributed to. He knew it was so much bigger than himself. Confidence is a prayer to see this big picture, to walk humbly, to do what you feel He has called you to do. The truth is real confidence comes from real belief. Belief in a creator that does see this big picture, who does call the unqualified to do unimaginably big things.”

== Commercial performance ==
It debuted at No. 48 on the Billboard Christian Airplay chart on the issue week of February 24, 2018. After a long, thirty-six week climb, it finally reached the Top 10. It peaked at No. 7. It debuted at No. 16 on the Hot Christian Songs chart, their highest debut in their career. On its thirteenth week, it reached the Top 10, peaking at No. 10. It continued its Christian radio dominance by cracking the top 10 on the Nielsen AC Monitored charts at radio, and was as high as No. 2 on AC indicator. After twenty-eight weeks, it departed from the Christian Songs chart.

The song also crossed over to the Hot Rock Songs chart, debuting at No. 43. It peaked at No. 17.

== Music video ==
The music video for the single "Confidence" was released on February 23, 2018. The video features the band performing the track in a dimly lit room.

== Charts ==
=== Weekly charts ===
Weekly chart performance for "Confidence"
Chart (2018)	Peak position
US Christian Airplay (Billboard)	7
US Hot Christian Songs (Billboard)	10
US Hot Rock & Alternative Songs (Billboard)	17

=== Year-end charts ===
Year-end chart performance for "Confidence"
Chart (2018)	Peak position
US Christian Airplay (Billboard)	24
US Hot Christian Songs (Billboard)	35
US Hot Rock Songs (Billboard)	49

== Certifications ==
Certifications for "Confidence"
Region	Certification	Certified units/sales
United States (RIAA)	Platinum	1,000,000^{‡}
^{‡} Sales+streaming figures based on certification alone.
