= Run (Sanctus Real album) =

Studio album by Sanctus Real
- Released: February 5, 2013
- Recorded: 2012
- Genre: Contemporary Christian music, Christian rock
- Length: 44:25
- Label: Sparrow
- Producer: Jason Ingram, Seth Mosley, Christopher Stevens

Sanctus Real chronology
Pieces of a Real Heart (2010)	Run (2013)	The Dream (2014)

Singles from Run
- 1. "Promises" Released: October 9, 2012; 2. "Pray" Released: April 30, 2013

Run is the sixth studio album from contemporary Christian music band Sanctus Real. It was released on February 5, 2013 via Sparrow Records. In addition, the album producers are Jason Ingram, Seth Mosley and Christopher Stevens. The album has already garnered acclaim from the reviewers and has already achieved success from the lead single "Promises" on the charts. Furthermore, the album charted on the Billboard 200 and Billboard Christian Albums charts at Nos. 112 and 6 respectively in the debut week of February 23, 2013.

== Background ==
=== Methodology and concentration ===
Sanctus Real gave an interview to Worship Leader and were asked "How is your approach and focus different this time around in your new record, RUN?"

RUN is more than an album title, it’s a statement about this season of our lives. We've spent a lot of years walking, sometimes stumbling through doors of opportunity as God has opened them one by one. You could liken our early career to an individual living paycheck to paycheck. We've set our eyes on a some new goals and dreams, and with God’s help, we’re ready to run.

— Sanctus Real, Worship Leader

=== Title significance ===
Sanctus Real was asked the question in the same interview with Worship Leader that "What is the meaning of your album title, RUN? What do you hope to convey to long-time fans as well as new listeners?"

We always hope that our songs help people feel connected with God and to put their hope in Him. We also want our album title to convey that Sanctus Real isn’t planning on going anywhere but forward from here. We have a renewed vision and sense of calling.

— Sanctus Real, Worship Leader

=== Others involvement ===
Sanctus Real was asked the question in the same interview with Worship Leader that "How have Chris Stevens (TobyMac), Jason Ingram (Brandon Heath), and Seth Mosley (Newsboys) working together as producers on your album RUN reshaped your sound and voice as a band?"

Each of our producers bring out different strengths and weaknesses in every band member, from writing to arrangements and performance. Each one of those guys have stretched us to be better individually and as a band.

— Sanctus Real, Worship Leader

== Critical reception ==
Professional ratings
Review scores
Source	Rating
About.com	4.5/5 stars
Alt Rock Live	8/10 stars
CCM Magazine	4/5 stars
Christian Music Zine	4.5/5 stars
CM Addict	4.5/5 stars
Cross Rhythms	7/10 squares
Indie Vision Music	4/5 stars
Jesus Freak Hideout	4/5 stars 2.5/5 stars
Louder Than the Music	4/5 stars
New Release Tuesday	4/5 stars 4.5/5 stars
Worship Leader	4.5/5 stars

Run has achieved "universal acclaim" by the critics, and has received all but one positive or favorable review, which the lone dissent is from Jesus Freak Hideout's second staff opinion who gave it a mixed rating at that.

Run has been rated a four-and-a-half-stars-out-of-five by the following publications: About.com, Christian Music Zine, CM Addict New Release Tuesday's Sarah Fine and Worship Leader. About.com's Kim Jones illustrated how "Run kind of sneaks up on you. At first listen, it sounds pretty good but not really earth-shattering. The second listen is when the lyrics really start to hit home and by the third listen, you're in awe because it all falls into place." Joshua Andre of Christian Music Zine proclaimed "this album is one of their best." CM Addict's Andrew Funderburk praised "This album was nothing short of encouraging listeners to keep the pace in our faith." Sarah Fine of New Release Tuesday called Run "a powerful project that shows an incredible maturity in the band's style and songwriting." To this, Fine trumpeted that the band "Never shying away from hard topics, this album offers authenticity with a shimmering glimmer of hope in each song, making it one of the 'must-own' albums of 2013. I applaud the band on their desire to write music that ignores popular trends and focuses more on touching the hearts of people. With Run, they've absolutely accomplished that." Andy Joy of Worship Leader espoused "From start to finish, Run is full of energy, both lyrically and musically. Both the lyrics and music are upbeat and uplifting quite literally: every chorus on the record begins with a major chord. Rather than a weakness, Run’s song structure actually gives the record a feeling of completeness. Paired with singer Matt Hammitt’s lyrics, the songs feel wonderfully authentic. Behind the catchy melodies and big electric guitars, Run feels like the work of seasoned songwriters with years of life experience writing their personal prayers into the lyrics of each song."

The album got four-stars-out-of-five from the following publications: CCM Magazine, Indie Vision Music, Jesus Freak Hideout's John Choquette, Louder Than the Music and New Release Tuesday's Mary Burklin. Andy Argyrakis of CCM Magazine evoked how the album "seek[s] to encourage listeners going through a test of any nature with encouraging, empathetic lyrics of healing and hope." Jonathan Andre of Indie Vision Music promoted it as "a poetic and compelling album." Jesus Freak Hideout's John "Flip" Choquette noted that "While the band has successfully transformed their sound into a sugary, pop-covered sheen, the lack of musical experimentation sometimes leaves songs sounding too similar and making it difficult to distinguish one from another." On the other hand, Choquette wrote that "Enter Run, the band's most radio-friendly release yet, filled with some of the most honest, heartfelt lyrics Sanctus Real has ever written...While Fight the Tide might have been Sanctus Real's best rock release, Run may be just the beginning of a promising new direction." Louder Than the Music's Jono Davies embraced it as a "solid album" that "the best part is actually the themes running through it." In addition, Davies surmised that "The music is solid, the vocals are solid, but most of all - the lyrics are true and honest about who God is and what He has done for us." New Release Tuesday's Mary Burklin foretold that "Run is an intensely hopeful album that captures joy in musical form without oversimplifying the truths it presents. Matt Hammitt's gentle but soaring vocals are stronger than ever, carrying the songs over the more pop-oriented guitar beds laid down by guitarists Chris Rohman and Pete Prevost. This album is diverse enough to stay interesting through the 12-track standard length, but still musically grounded and cohesive. The songs shine as gentle reminders of hope in a hurting world, with every layer of each song saturated by grace."

Furthermore, AllMusic's James Christopher Monger vowing that Run "leans harder on the pop side of the spectrum, offering up 11 potential singles that blend soaring melodies with inspirational lyrics that, for the most part, manage to steer clear of cliché. Honest, heartfelt, and engaging, and boasting more than a handful of standout cuts". Jonathan Faulkner of Alt Rock Live gave the album an eight-out-of-ten-stars, and noted that "It’s no surprise that Sanctus Real has put out another beautifully crafted album. The band keeps getting better with age, making it more and more exciting to hear what they will put out next." Graeme Crawford of Cross Rhythms rated the album a seven-stars-out-of-ten, and noted that "Opinion seems to be divided over 'Run', as some see it as a tremendous and vital album, while others view it more as a sign of the descent of Christian rock bands into the dark realms of commercialism and style over substance. It certainly has a highly polished production and more than a hint of radio-friendliness, but it is also engaging and uplifting. Sanctus Real are not breaking any new ground by any means, but there is that sort of familiar comfort that you get from slipping into a favourite jumper."

The lone mixed review came from Alex "Tincan" Caldwell of Jesus Freak Hideout, who rated the album two-and-a-half-out-of-five-stars, and highlighted that the two highlight's from the album are "Nothing Between" and "Picture of Grace". However, Caldwell wrote that "Those tunes are unfortunately among Run's few highlights. The bevy of similar sounding, though watered down, tunes that remain--with unimaginative titles like 'Pray,' 'Promises,' 'That's Life' and 'We Will Never Give Up'--sound like crowd-sourced greeting card sentiments with middle-of-the-road pop rock backdrops. Sanctus Real has demonstrated in the past that they are capable of writing hooky, yet thought-provoking songs with heart, and with almost three years between albums, it seems like Matt Hammitt and company could have come up with a lot more to say than is evidenced on Run."

== Commercial performance ==
On February 23, 2013, Billboard magazine confirmed that Run was the sixth most sold Christian album via the Christian Albums chart. In addition, the album was the 112th most popular in the United States that same week and that is evidenced by the Billboard 200 charting.

== Track listing ==
Standard Edition
No.	Title	Writer(s)	Length
1.	"Run"	Matt Hammitt, Jason Ingram, Chris Rohman	3:07
2.	"On Our Own"	Dan Gartley, Mark Graalman, Hammitt, Ingram, Pete Prevost, Rohman	3:55
3.	"Promises"	Graalman, Hammitt, Prevost, Rohman	3:22
4.	"Pray"	Hammitt, Rohman, Christopher Stevens	3:56
5.	"We Will Never Give Up"	Hammitt, Ingram, Rohman	3:34
6.	"Nothing Between"	Hammitt, Seth Mosley	3:43
7.	"Commitment"	Hammitt	3:37
8.	"Keep Me Young"	Gartley, Graalman, Hammitt, Sarah Macintosh, Prevost, Rohman	3:49
9.	"One of Those Things"	Gartley, Graalman, Hammitt, Prevost, Rohman	3:56
10.	"Better Than This"	Gartley, Graalman, Hammitt, Prevost, Rohman	3:57
11.	"Picture of Grace"	Gartley, Graalman, Hammitt, Ingram, Prevost, Rohman	3:52
12.	"You Are God"	Hammitt, Prevost, Rohman	3:37
Total length:			44:25

Deluxe Edition
No.	Title	Length
13.	"That's Life"	3:30
14.	"Love You Tightly"	3:34
15.	"One More Show"	2:23
16.	"Sanctuary"	3:38
Total length:		58:30

Bonus track
No.	Title	Length
17.	"Run (Remix)" (iTunes pre-order exclusive)	3:38
Total length:		61:08

== Personnel ==
Sanctus Real

- Matt Hammitt – vocals
- Pete Prevost – keyboards, guitars, banjo
- Chris Rohman – guitars
- Dan Gartley – bass
- Mark Graalman – drums

Additional musicians

- Jason Ingram – programming, backing vocals
- Tim Lauer – keyboards, programming
- Seth Mosley – keyboards, programming, guitars, backing vocals
- Jonathan Smith – programming, mandolin
- Christopher Stevens – keyboards, programming
- Joe Williams – programming, backing vocals
- Vince DiCarlo – backing vocals
- Micah Kuiper – backing vocals
- Alan Thomas – backing vocals

== Charts ==
=== Album ===
Chart (2013)	Peak position
US Billboard 200	112
US Top Christian Albums (Billboard)	6
