= Ever Stays Red =

American Christian rock and pop band

- Origin: Mesa, Arizona, US
- Genre: Christian rock Pop
- Years active: 2002–2008
- Label: Vertical Shift
- Past members: Dustin Carlson; Zach Andresen; Erik Brunner; Josh Carlson

Ever Stays Red was an American Christian rock and pop band created in 2002 by a group of four friends who have been striving to create high-energy rock music with one purpose: to use their music to change the world. After two independent releases, and several years of touring, the band was finally able to get their newest album, titled On the Brink of it All, released on the national level in 2008.

== History ==
Ever Stays Red formed in late 2002, when the four recently graduated high-school friends decided to start a band. Determined to creating music that would touch people's souls, they bought a small home in Phoenix, Arizona, and became roommates. They filled the house with more musical equipment than furniture, and produced more music than meals, soon turning the small home into "the" loft studio. A short 2 years later, the band hit the road in support of their debut album, I'll Tell The World. Playing in over 250 shows across America, they quickly gathered a group of devoted fans, with 3 songs from their album going into the 'top-twenty rock single' list, and the album selling over 20,000 units. With the money made from the touring, Ever Stays Red managed to fund a trip to Belo Horizonte, Brazil, where they performed nightly for thousands of young Brazilian teens, many of which lived in the inner city. Throughout that 12-day stretch of shows, the band witnessed firsthand the power the music had to transcend culture and creed, making them even more certain of their calling.

"Brazil was a turning point for this band,” says Carlson. “It was the moment in time when we all realized that we were a part of something so much bigger than ourselves. We came home from that trip committed to the idea that music becomes meaningful when it brings hope--we have always strived to make meaningful music. I wrote songs for the new album from my heart; songs about never giving up on the dreams inside of you, songs about redemption, songs about daring to believe in what the world could be."

Fueled by the idea of a second trip to Brazil in 2006, the band returned to their home in the states, and started recording its second album. They finally independently released the album, entitled These Words Become Us, an album that quickly gathered airplay at numerous rock radio stations across the states.

Throughout this time, the band toured with bands like Kutless, Sanctus Real, Falling Up, Hawk Nelson, Dizmas, Everyday Sunday, Stellar Kart, and This Beautiful Republic.

In the spring of 2007, Ever Stays Red signed with Vertical Shift Records (VSR Music), and was asked to record a third album. Released in March 2008, On the Brink Of It All represents how the band gave everything to follow their dreams and begin a music career. With honest vocals, and gripping lyrics aimed to please fans of rock and roll and worship music alike, the album embodies the band's firm belief that the dreams that inspire us should never be allowed to die.

== Former members ==
- Dustin Carlson - lead vocals, guitar
- Zach Andresen - guitar, vocals
- Erik Brunner - bass
- Josh Carlson - drums

== Discography ==
- I'll Tell the World (2004, Independent)
- These Words Become Us (2006, Independent)
- On the Brink Of It All (2008, VSR Music)
