= Fight the Tide =

Studio album by Sanctus Real
- Released: June 15, 2004
- Studio: Antenna Studios (Brentwood, Tennessee)
- Genre: Christian rock
- Length: 45:49
- Label: Sparrow Records
- Producer: Tedd T

Sanctus Real chronology
Say it Loud (2002)	Fight the Tide (2004)	The Face of Love (2006)

Professional ratings
Review scores
Source	Rating
Allmusic	4/5 stars
Jesus Freak Hideout	4/5 stars
Christian Music Today	4/5 stars

Fight the Tide is the second studio album from Christian rock band Sanctus Real, and was released on June 15, 2004 under Sparrow Records. Most of the album was written within one month and recorded in only four weeks. According to band members, the tight schedule caused them to refine the album's various musical and lyrical elements.

Fight the Tide won a GMA Dove Award for Modern Rock Album of the Year in 2005 and was generally well received by music critics. It also spawned the singles "Everything About You" and "The Fight Song", both of which hit #1 on Christian rock radio charts.

== Background ==
I think the short schedule pushed us to do the best we could. [...] Despite the short amount of time, there wasn't one word or musical element that was overlooked. Every piece of each song was intentionally combed over, and we're proud of that.

— Matt Hammitt, Christianity Today interview

In July 2003, before the band had prepared songs for Fight the Tide, lead vocalist Matt Hammitt said of the album: "[On Say it Loud] we wrote about every day life or about God but didn't open ourselves up completely and weren't vulnerable to listeners. I hope on the next album we really open up and pour it out."

In February 2004, Sanctus Real returned to the studio to record their second album, and nearly all of the tracks were written in the previous month. They only had four weeks to track and record the album in studio, and according to band members, recording sessions were very intensive and tiring. Hammitt said, "If we weren't in the studio laying down tracks, we were at home working on lyrics, melodies, and rewrites. It really felt like a 24 hour-a-day job for about four weeks." He estimated that two months would have been an ideal amount of time to record the album, but that the experience "was cool and it stretched us". Due to the constant guitar playing, especially during the second half of their recording time, guitarist Chris Rohman tried putting nail polish on his fingertips because they felt so raw.

Tedd T served as producer for Fight the Tide; it was recorded and mixed at Antenna Studios in Brentwood, Tennessee.

== Lyrical themes ==
There are several themes on Fight the Tide, although its lyrics are mainly centered around various aspects of the Christian faith. Lead vocalist Matt Hammitt noted how some of the tracks were based on the Biblical epistle of James, such as "Deeds", which discusses the idea that faith and works are not separable, and "The Fight Song", which references James' concept about the influence of "the tongue". Interpersonal relationships are another common topic. Hammitt and bassist Steve Goodrum wrote "The Fight Song" together, which was about a conflict between Goodrum and a friend: "I was kind of hurt, but I'm still close to that person ... The song is about fighting over small, unimportant things—the things that divide churches, marriages, and close relationships." "Alone" is a love song while "Change Me" is written as a prayer asking for better patience and kindness with others; the latter was written after Hammitt once "lost patience" with his wife: "I felt like less of a person at that point. That hurt me as well as it hurt her, because I said some stupid things when I was angry."

== Promotion and release ==
In September 2004, Sanctus Real embarked on their first headlining tour, the Fight the Tide Tour. The tour covered over 25 cities and featured guest bands Hawk Nelson, Seven Places and Ever Stays Red.

The album's lead single, "Everything About You" was released to radios around the same time of the album's release. The song eventually reached #1 on R&R magazine's Christian rock chart in September, and held the position for six consecutive weeks.

== Accolades ==
On 2005, the album won a Dove Award for Modern Rock Album of the Year at the 36th GMA Dove Awards. The song "Everything About You" was also nominated for Rock Recorded Song of the Year.

== Track listing ==
Album release
No.	Title	Writer(s)	Length
1.	"Everything About You"	Steve Goodrum, Matt Hammitt, Chris Rohman	4:06
2.	"The Fight Song"	Goodrum, Hammitt	3:39
3.	"Alone"	Hammitt, Rohman	4:19
4.	"Things Like You"	Hammitt	4:02
5.	"Closer"	Hammitt, Rohman	3:54
6.	"Change Me"	Hammitt	4:12
7.	"The Show"	Hammitt, Rohman	3:56
8.	"Message"	Hammitt, Rohman	3:31
9.	"Deeds"	Hammitt, Rohman	3:08
10.	"You Can't Hide"	Hammitt, Rohman	3:39
11.	"Where Will They Go"	Hammitt, Rohman	3:26
12.	"Say Goodbye"	Hammitt, Rohman	8:47
13.	"Everything About You" (Alternate Version)	Goodrum, Hammitt, Rohman	6:22
Total length:			57:01

Note

- "Say Goodbye" includes 5 minutes of silence.

== Personnel ==
Sanctus Real

- Matt Hammitt – lead vocals, backing vocals, guitars
- Chris Rohman – guitars, backing vocals
- Steve Goodrum – bass, backing vocals
- Mark Graalman – drums, backing vocals

== Production ==
- Christopher York – executive producer
- Tedd T. – producer, overdub recording, mixing
- Allen Salmon – track recording
- Damon Riley – overdub recording
- Rusty Varenkamp – overdub recording
- Richard Dodd – mastering
- Jan Cook – creative direction
- Benji Peck – art direction, design, illustration
- Kristen Barlowe – photography
- Keith Shackleford and Commonrock Entertainment – management

== Charts ==
Album

  - Billboard's Hot Christian Albums – #23
  - Billboard's Top Heatseekers – #38

Singles

  - "Everything About You" – #1 on R&R magazine's Christian rock chart
  - "The Fight Song" – #1 on R&R magazine's Christian rock chart
