= Say It Loud (Sanctus Real album) =

Say it Loud

Studio album by Sanctus Real
- Released: December 24, 2002
- Recorded: 2002
- Studio: West Main Studios (Franklin, TN); The Dungeon Studios (Nashville, TN).
- Genre: Christian rock
- Length: 48:55
- Label: Sparrow
- Producer: Pete Stewart

Sanctus Real chronology
Nothing to Lose (2001)	Say it Loud (2002)	Fight the Tide (2004)

Professional ratings
Review scores
Source	Rating
AllMusic	3/5 stars
Jesus Freak Hideout	4/5 stars
Christian Music Today	4/5 stars

Say It Loud is an album by the band Sanctus Real. It was released on December 24, 2002 under Sparrow Records. This was Sanctus Real's first studio album, after three independent releases.

== Track listing ==
All tracks are written by Matt Hammitt and Chris Rohman, except where noted.

Say It Loud
No.	Title	Length
1.	"Sink or Swim"	3:13
2.	"Captain's Chair"	3:09
3.	"Say It Loud"	3:52
4.	"Hey Wait"	3:53
5.	"Inspiration"	2:46
6.	"Audience of One"	3:44
7.	"The Way I Feel"	3:29
8.	"I Love You" (writer: Hammitt)	2:17
9.	"All I Want"	3:01
10.	"Nothing to Lose"	3:27
11.	"Won't Walk Away"	3:53
12.	"After Today"	12:05
Total length:		48:49

Note

- "After Today" includes hidden track "Jesus Metal (Slam The Devil)".

== Personnel ==
Sanctus Real

- Matt Hammitt – lead vocals, backing vocals, rhythm guitars
- Chris Rohman – lead guitars
- Steve Goodrum – bass, backing vocals
- Mark Graalman – drums

Additional musicians

- Pete Stewart – programming, additional guitars
- Brian Siewert – string sample programming (4)

== Production ==
- Christopher York – executive producer
- Pete Stewart – producer
- Brent Hendrich – engineer
- F. Reid Shippen – engineer, mixing at Recording Arts (Nashville, Tennessee)
- Dan Shike – mix assistant
- Brian Gardner – mastering at Bernie Grundman Mastering (Hollywood, California)
- Brian Hayes – drum technician
- Jan Cook – creative director
- Benji Peck – art direction, design, illustration
- Alan W. Abramowitz – front cover photography
- Allen Clark – back cover photography
