= We Need Each Other (song) =

Single by Sanctus Real

from the album We Need Each Other
- Released: November 13, 2007
- Recorded: 2007
- Genre: Pop rock
- Length: 4:16
- Label: Sparrow
- Songwriters: Sanctus Real, Christopher Stevens
- Producer: Christopher Stevens

Sanctus Real singles chronology
"Don't Give Up" (2007)	"We Need Each Other" (2007)	"Whatever You're Doing (Something Heavenly)" (2008)

"We Need Each Other" is a song by Christian rock band Sanctus Real, from their fourth album We Need Each Other. The song was released on November 13, 2007, and reached number 1 on R&R's Christian CHR chart in January 2008. It was the 8th most played song of 2008 on Christian CHR radio.

== Music and lyrics ==
The song has a pop-based sound, and has been described as keeping an "energetic pace" for the album. According to lead vocalist Matt Hammit, "This is a song about communication. I wrote it when I made a personal commitment to communicate honestly (out of love) with the people I hold dear. Unresolved conflict wears on my soul ... I don't want to end up alone because I wasn't willing to take the time and energy to tell someone how I felt."

== Release and reception ==
On November 13, 2007, "We Need Each Other" was released as the lead single from the band's album of the same name, We Need Each Other. It began to climb R&R's Christian CHR chart, and reached number 1 in January 2008.

The song received positive reviews from music critics. Jesus Freak Hideout reviewer John DiBiase called it a "bold and monumental anthem", claiming that the band "maintains a sound that is altogether a progression forward". Christa Banister of Christianity Today said that the song "beautifully sums up how God is the friend who is always with us." CCM Magazine was very positive towards the track, claiming that it was rare with an "unforgettable melody"; the review described it as a "brilliantly written pop anthem that will move you and have you singing along."

== Charts ==
Chart (2008)	Peak position
R&R's Christian CHR format	1
