= I'm Not Alright (Sanctus Real song) =

Single by Sanctus Real

from the album The Face of Love
- Released: February 21, 2006
- Genre: Alternative Rock, CCM, Emo
- Length: 4:08 (album version); 4:19 (single version)
- Label: Sparrow Records
- Songwriters: Sanctus Real, Doug McKelvey, Christopher Stevens
- Producer: Christopher Stevens

Sanctus Real singles chronology
"Closer" (2005)	"I'm Not Alright" (2006)	"The Face of Love" (2006)

"I'm Not Alright" is a song by Christian rock band Sanctus Real from their album The Face of Love. It was a number 1 hit on Christian radio in 2006. In 2007, the song was nominated at the GMA Dove Awards for Rock/Contemporary Recorded Song of the Year. The song also appeared on the compilation albums WOW Hits 2007 and WOW #1s.

== Background ==
During the songwriting process, "I'm Not Alright" was originally planned to be titled "I'll Be Fine" when it was a demo. Sanctus Real lead vocalist Matt Hammit said in an interview: "This song definitely led the way for the honesty that was expressed on this record [The Face of Love] ... We went into the studio with this "I'll Be Fine" song, and we just weren't having it. We were lying to ourselves even trying to write a song like that." In April 2005, during a studio recording session, producer Christopher Stevens was playing chords they had planned for the track. The band decided to rework the lyrics to portray a different theme: "You know what? I'm not all right. ... We're not going to lie. We're not going to try to sit here and try to sugarcoat what's happening right now or say something because it sounds good", Hammit said. "[We] went over it and ended up with 'I'm Not Alright', which was a true confession of how we were feeling and gave us a little of the freedom and emotional release to be honest and vulnerable."

== Music and lyrics ==
"I'm Not Alright" has lyrical themes of openness and honesty. According to a Christianity Today music review, the song "comfortably [rests] somewhere between Switchfoot's "Meant to Live" and Coldplay's "Fix You".

== Release and reception ==
The song was released on February 21, 2006 as the lead single from Sanctus Real's album The Face of Love, and went on to reach number 1 on Christian radio that year. It placed at number 5 on R&R magazine's 2006 year-end chart for the Christian rock radio format.

"I'm Not Alright" received a GMA Dove Award nomination for Rock/Contemporary Recorded Song of the Year in 2007.

== Music video ==
A music video was filmed for the song and officially released in mid-2006. The video was featured on MTV's mtvU competition in July and was eventually voted in by viewers as the winner among three other contestants. It was filmed at the fake intersection of 110th St East and Avenue I in Los Angeles County, California.

== Charts ==
Weekly chart performance for "I'm Not Alright"
Chart (2007)	Peak position
US Christian CHR (R&R)	1
