= The Dream (Sanctus Real album) =

Studio album by Sanctus Real
- Released: October 14, 2014
- Genre: Contemporary Christian music, Christian rock, contemporary worship music
- Length: 38:50
- Label: Sparrow
- Producer: Pete Kipley, Christopher Stevens

Sanctus Real chronology
Run (2013)	The Dream (2014)	Changed (2018)

The Dream is the seventh album from American Christian rock band Sanctus Real, released by Sparrow Records on October 14, 2014. Sanctus Real worked with producers Pete Kipley and Christopher Stevens in the creation of this album.

== Reception ==
Professional ratings
Review scores
Source	Rating
365 Days of Inspiring Media	4.5/5 stars
AllMusic	4/5 stars
CCM Magazine	4/5 stars
Christian Music Review	4.4/5
Christian Review Magazine	5/5 stars
Cross Rhythms	7/10 squares
Jesus Freak Hideout	3.5/5 stars 3/5 stars
Louder Than the Music	4.5/5 stars
Jesus Wired	8.5/10 stars
New Release Tuesday	4/5 stars
Worship Leader	3/5 stars

Indicating in a four star out of five review for AllMusic, David Jeffries mentioning, Sanctus Real are "Mellowing with age but as robust as ever, The Dream proves that Sanctus Real might very well be Christian rock's version of fine wine." Andy Argyrakis, agrees it is a four star album for CCM Magazine, declaring "Sanctus Real continues to shuffle up its established pop/rock sound with elements as diverse as dusty guitars, synthesizers and varied background vocals." Also in agreement is New Release Tuesday's Sarah Fine, with it being considered a four star release, declaring, "This is a solid release from one of Christian music's most established acts." Shaving a half star off his rating compared to the rest of the pack, John "Flip" Choquette realizing, "This album isn't perfect, but it's not bad either. It's not innovative, but it's not entirely generic either." Paul S. Ganney, in a seven out of ten review for Cross Rhythms, explaining, "Kicking off with the guitar-driven title track, then moving into electronica, this album gives you a good idea of the bases it'll cover right from the start: heavily echoed guitars, driving bass, wonderfully clear vocals." Awarding the album four and a half stars for Louder Than the Music, Jono Davies writes, "The songs have great lyrics and melodies and they just keep getting better with every listen." Amanda Brogan, rating the album a 4.4 out of five at Christian Music Review, says, "The Dream is classic Sanctus Real as you know and love them." Awarding the album an eight and a half star review for Jesus Wired, Rebekah Joys writes, "The album is full of inspirational, encouraging, and thought-provoking messages accompanied by upbeat and fun sounds to make it overall an album full of future hits." Christian St. John, rating the album five stars at Christian Review Magazine, states, Sanctus Real "have improved their music tenfold" on "a great album". Signaling in a four and a half star review from 365 Days of Inspiring Media, Joshua Andre replies, "Though the 11 track work of art [is] a masterpiece in its own right, [it] is sure to have its doubters... [because] ...they have taken the route of rock to CCM in a span of a few albums; as a pop/rock and CCM lover, this album is one of their best."

== Track listing ==
No.	Title	Writer(s)	Length
1.	"The Dream"	Mark Graalman, Matt Hammitt, Chris Rohman	3:44
2.	"I Need You"	Mark Graalman, Matt Hammitt, Chris Rohman, Jake Rye	3:30
3.	"Head in the Fight"	Mark Graalman, Matt Hammitt, Chris Rohman	3:37
4.	"Lay It Down"	Matt Hammitt, Pete Kipley, Chris Rohman	3:49
5.	"Easier on My Heart"	Mark Graalman, Matt Hammitt, Chris Rohman	3:12
6.	"Ride It Out"	Mark Graalman, Matt Hammitt, Chris Rohman, Jake Rye	3:15
7.	"Bend Not Break"	Mark Graalman, Matt Hammitt, Seth Mosley, Chris Rohman	3:38
8.	"Same God"	Andrew Fromm, Matt Hammitt, Seth Mosley, Chris Rohman	2:49
9.	"One Word at a Time"	Mark Graalman, Matt Hammitt, Chris Rohman, Jake Rye	3:10
10.	"33"	Mark Graalman, Matt Hammitt, Chris Rohman, Jake Rye	3:22
11.	"On Fire"	Mark Graalman, Matt Hammitt, Chris Rohman	3:37
12.	"The Beginning (Outro)"	Mark Graalman, Sanctus Real	1:07
Total length:			38:50

== Personnel ==
Sanctus Real

- Matt Hammitt – vocals
- Seth Huff – pianos, guitars
- Chris Rohman – synthesizers, guitars
- Jake Rye – bass
- Mark Graalman – drums

Additional musicians

- Bryan Fowler – programming
- Christopher Stevens – programming
- The Roy G. Biv String Vibe – strings

== Production ==
- Brad O'Donnell – A&R
- Pete Kipley – producer, engineer
- Christopher Stevens – producer (8, 11)
- Mike "X" O'Connor – engineer, editing
- Bryan Fowler – assistant engineer
- Jericho Scroggins – assistant engineer
- Neal Avron – mixing
- Sean Moffitt – mixing
- Mark Needham – mixing
- Warren David – mix assistant
- Ben O'Neill – mix assistant
- Scott Skrzynski – mix assistant
- Joe LaPorta – mastering
- Sarah Sung – package design
- Tyler Hays – logo design
- Mark Anderson – photography
- Jake Harsh – photography

== Charts ==
Chart (2014)	Peak position
US Billboard 200	191
US Christian Albums (Billboard)	14
