= Sanctus Real =

American Christian rock band

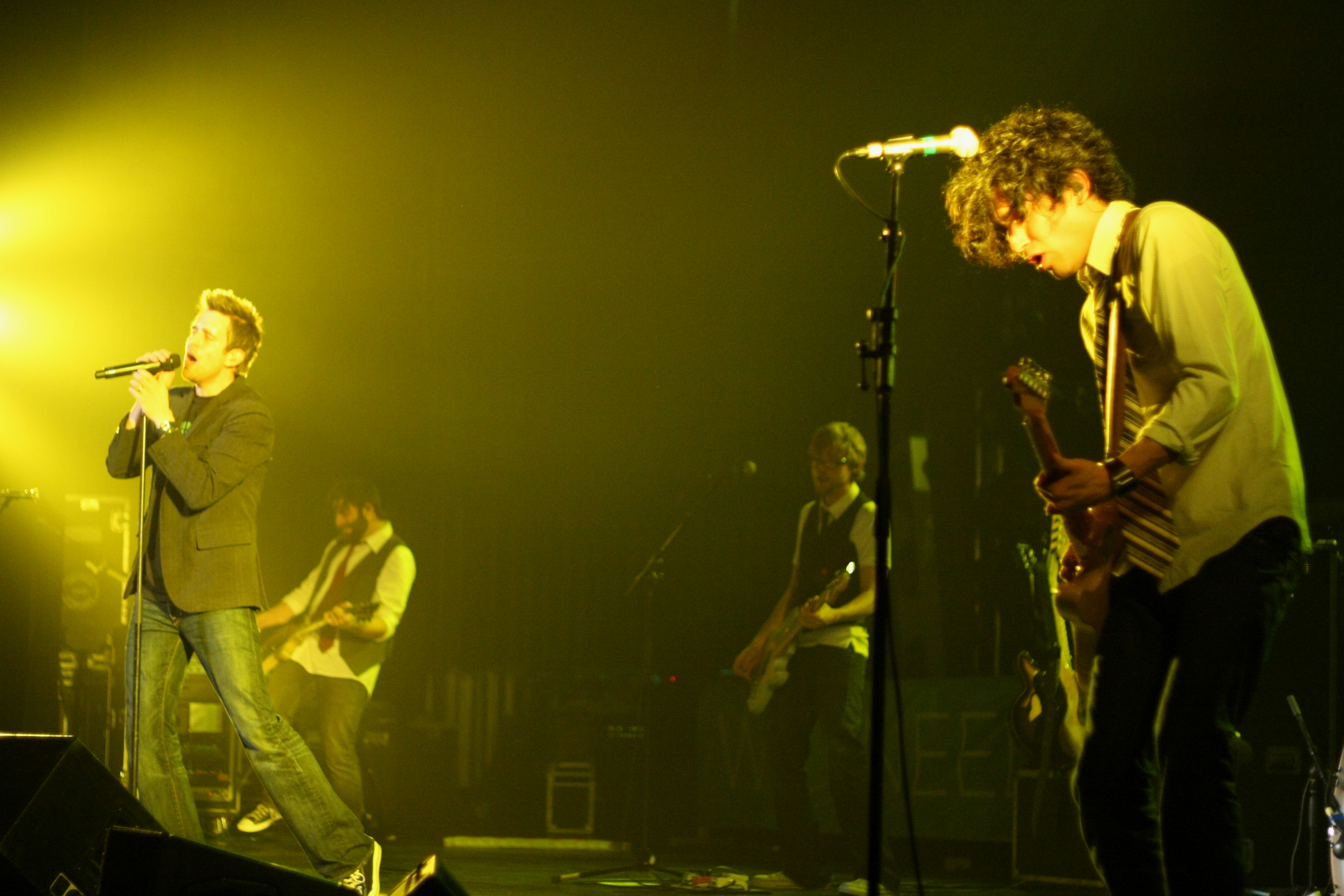
- Sanctus Real in 2008

Background information
- Origin: Toledo, Ohio, U.S.
- Genres: Contemporary Christian, Christian alternative rock, Christian rock
- Works: Sanctus Real discography
- Years active: 1996–present
- Labels: Sparrow, Framework, Fair Trade
- Members: Chris Rohman; Mark Graalman; Dustin Lolli
- Past members: Matt Hammitt; Pete Prevost; Dan Gartley; Steve Goodrum; Matt Kollar; Mike Gee; Jake Rye; Seth Huff
- Website: sanctusreal.com

Sanctus Real is an American Christian rock band formed in Toledo, Ohio, in 1996. The group is composed of Chris Rohman (lead guitar), Mark Graalman (drums), and Dustin Lolli (lead vocals). The band is best known for their No. 1 singles "Lead Me", "Forgiven", "Whatever You're Doing", "I'm Not Alright", "Don't Give Up", "We Need Each Other", "Everything About You", and "The Fight Song". Since 2002, they have released seven albums through the Sparrow Records label, an independent EP, This Is Love, and three albums on Framework Records.

On July 1, 2015, lead singer and co-founder, Matt Hammitt, announced that he was leaving the band, which would take effect by the end of 2015. Dustin Lolli joined the band as lead singer shortly thereafter.

Sanctus Real was formed in 1996, and the band released three independent albums over five years. After signing with Sparrow Records in 2002, the group released their major label debut, Say It Loud, at the end of the year. In June 2004 it was followed by Fight the Tide, which garnered a GMA Dove Award win in 2005, and two singles that charted at No. 1 on Christian radio, according to R&R magazine. The band's third album, The Face of Love, was released in April 2006. The single "I'm Not Alright" received a GMA Dove Award nomination in 2007.

Their fourth album, We Need Each Other (2008), was recorded in late 2007 and released in February. It received a Grammy Award nomination and spawned the single "We Need Each Other". Sanctus Real released their fifth studio album in March 2010, titled Pieces of a Real Heart also receiving a Grammy nomination with Christian Billboard chart topping hits "Lead Me" and "Forgiven". The band's music incorporates a modern alternative rock style, and has evolved from power pop to a more melodic and guitar-driven sound.

== History ==
In 1996, lead singer and guitarist Matt Hammitt met guitarist Chris Rohman when they were both tenth graders attending Toledo Christian School in Ohio. They led youth worship at their school and church, and began writing their own music that year. Drummer Mark Graalman and bassist Matt Kollar soon joined, forming the band's original line-up. The group performed their first concert for several friends in the back of a warehouse in December 1996. They released a six-track demo tape in August 1997, and a five-track EP titled All This Talk of Aliens in January 1998.

Sanctus Real's full-length studio album Message for the Masses was released on June 18, 1999, and shortly afterward, bassist Matt Kollar was replaced by Steve Goodrum. Following Message for the Masses, which was recorded in a garage, the band made plans to record tracks at a major studio. To earn money for the endeavor, Hammitt and Goodrum took telemarketing jobs for a few months, which were difficult and described by Hammitt as "the most dreadful [jobs] ever". They recorded three songs with producer Skidd Mills in Memphis, Tennessee, and after winning a local radio contest, decided to record an entire independent album with Mills. It was completed in 2000 under the title Nothing to Lose, and the band attended 2001's Gospel Music Week in Nashville to distribute copies of the project.

From 1996 to 2001, Sanctus Real toured areas of the United States, and also sent demos to several Christian and mainstream record labels. After they received multiple recording contract offers in 2001, the band decided to sign with Sparrow Records. Matt Hammitt said, "At that point, we really had to do some soul searching and figure out where it was we were supposed to be ... Ultimately, we knew we could relate to kids in the church. We are passionate about our faith ... [and] from our personal experience, we felt this was the place we were supposed to be."

=== Say It Loud ===
Toward the end of 2002, before releasing their first non-independent album, Sanctus Real performed as an opening act on the Festival Con Dios tour. The band was also a guest on Bleach's first headlining tour, the We Are Tomorrow tour, in December 2002. Sanctus Real's major label debut, Say It Loud, was then released in December 2002, through Sparrow Records. The album was produced by former Grammatrain lead vocalist Pete Stewart. Sanctus Real began touring again in February 2003 as a guest band on the See Spot Rock Tour, with Relient K, the O.C. Supertones, Pillar and John Reuben.

=== Fight the Tide ===
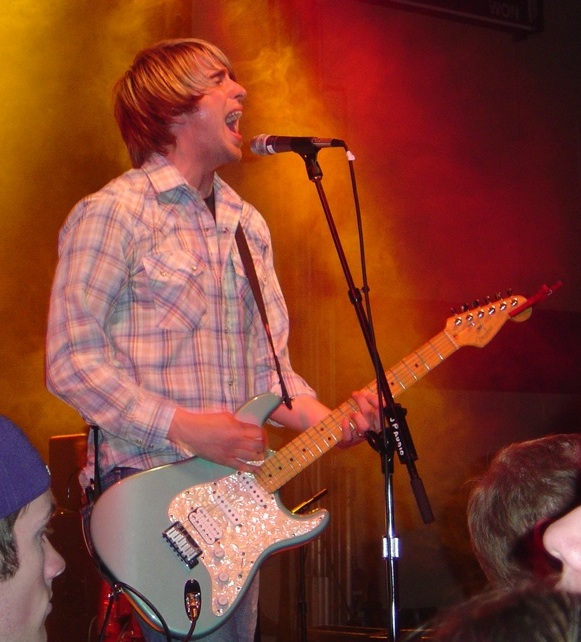
Lead vocalist Matt Hammitt in April 2004

The band recorded a cover of U2's song, "Beautiful Day", for the compilation album In the Name of Love: Artists United for Africa, which was released at the beginning of 2004. The track reached No. 1 on R&R magazine's Christian rock chart in 2004, becoming their first chart-topping single. "Beautiful Day" also received a GMA Dove Award nomination for Modern Rock Song of the Year in 2004. The band also did a cover of the song "Promised Land" for the 2004 album Veggie Rocks.

In February 2004, the band went back in studio to record their second album; almost all of its tracks were written the previous month. It was recorded in six weeks with producer Tedd T, and soon released under the title Fight the Tide in June 2004. The lead single "Everything About You" was released in mid-2004, and by September it had stayed at No. 1 on R&R's Christian rock chart for six consecutive weeks. The song was later featured on the X 2006 compilation album in 2005. In September 2004, Sanctus Real launched their first headlining tour, the Fight the Tide Tour. The tour featured guest bands Hawk Nelson, Seven Places and Ever Stays Red, and traveled through more than 25 cities.

After being nominated in late 2004, Fight the Tide won the GMA Dove Award for "Modern Rock Album of the Year" in early 2005. Released near the beginning of the year, "The Fight Song" was Sanctus Real's next single, and in May 2005 it reached the top of R&R's Christian rock chart, becoming the band's third No. 1 song. In April 2005, bass player Steve Goodrum left the band and was replaced by Dan Gartley, a previous touring member of Relient K. Gartley played his first concert with Sanctus Real at the Agape Festival in May 2005.

=== The Face of Love ===
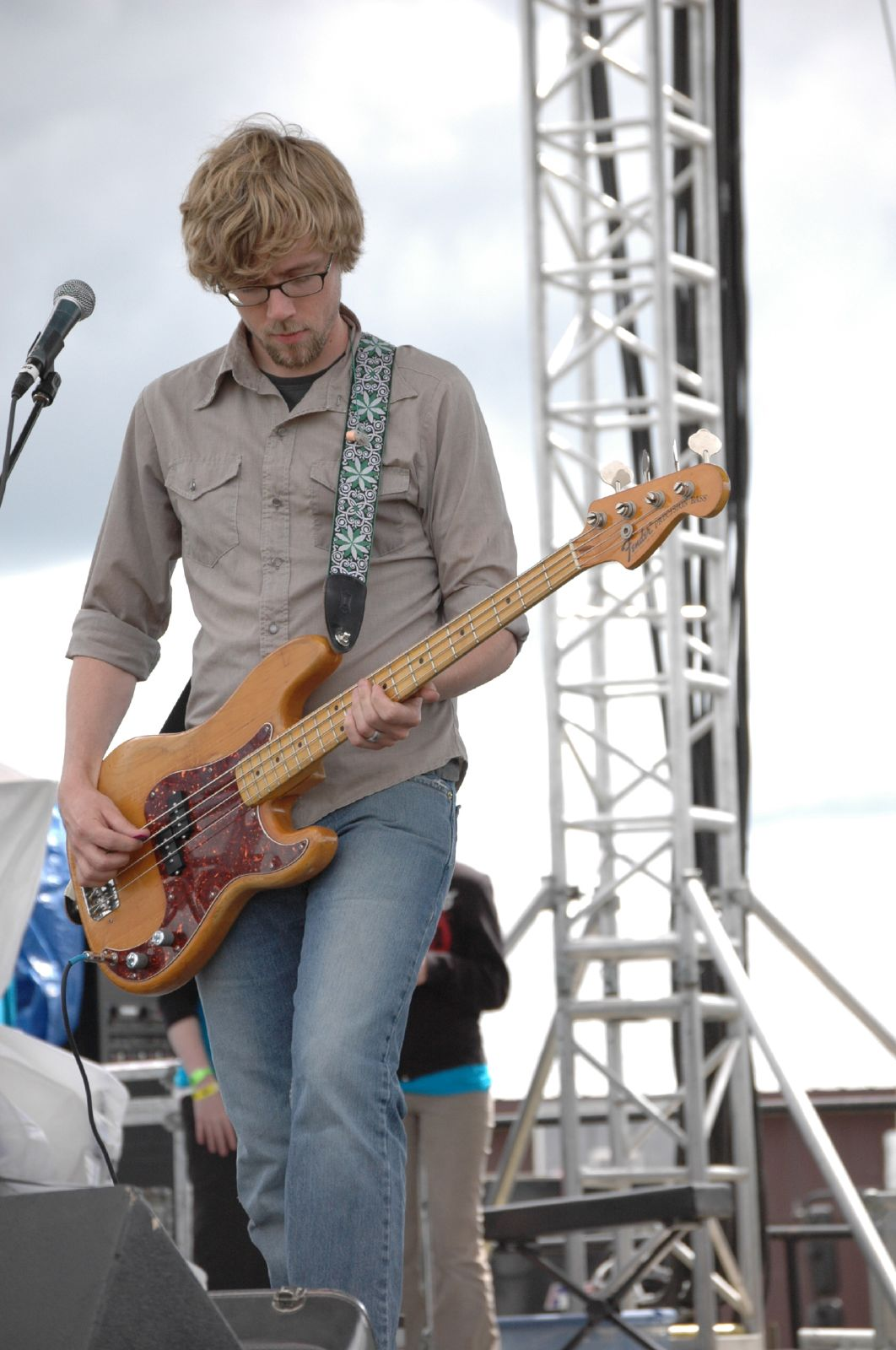
Bassist Dan Gartley in June 2006

Sanctus Real's third main studio album, The Face of Love, was released in April 2006. The album's first single was "I'm Not Alright" became a No. 1 song on Christian contemporary hit radio (CHR), as reported by R&R magazine. It was also the third most played song of 2006 on Christian radio formats. In early 2007, the band received two GMA Dove Award nominations: "Rock Contemporary Recorded Song of the Year" for "I'm Not Alright" and "Rock/Contemporary Album of the Year" for The Face of Love. Following the album's release, Pete Prevost became the fifth member of Sanctus Real as an additional guitarist.

The album's second single, "Don't Give Up", was released in the beginning of 2007, and by May it became the band's fifth No. 1 track by placing at the top of R&R's Christian CHR chart. At the end of 2006 they were named the most-played artist of the year on R&R's Christian CHR chart. The title track "The Face of Love" was also a radio single. Sanctus Real launched another headlining tour in April 2007, The Face of Love tour, featuring Needtobreathe and This Beautiful Republic.

=== We Need Each Other ===
In August 2007, Sanctus Real returned to the studio to record a fourth album, which was complete by the end of the year. In November 2007, the album was originally slated for release under the title Turn on the Lights, the name of a track on the album. It was later changed to We Need Each Other, and was released in February 2008, through Sparrow Records. The title track "We Need Each Other" was released earlier as the album's lead single in November 2007. The song stayed No. 1 on R&R's Christian CHR chart for five consecutive weeks by February 2008, and it was 2008's eighth most-played song of the year in the same format.

During early to mid 2008, Sanctus Real guest starred on Third Day's headlining tour, and also appeared on an episode of Extreme Makeover: Home Edition. Two more singles from We Need Each Other were additionally released: "Whatever You're Doing (Something Heavenly)" in early 2008, and "Turn On the Lights" in August 2008. Later in the year, the band launched their own two-month We Need Each Other Tour in the United States, passing through 16 states and over 30 cities. The tour featured guest appearances from VOTA, Tenth Avenue North and speaker Sammy Adebiyi. In 2009, We Need Each Other received a Grammy Award nomination for Best Rock Gospel Album.

=== Pieces of a Real Heart ===
In mid November 2009, Matt Hammitt announced on Twitter that Sanctus Real had finished recording their fifth album. The first radio single, "Forgiven", peaked at No. 6 on the Hot Christian Songs chart. On December 2, 2009, the band announced on Twitter and Facebook that they narrowed the final album name down to two options: A Million Hearts and Pieces of a Real Heart, and held a public vote for one hour. Shortly after, it was confirmed that the title Pieces of a Real Heart would be chosen. The album was released on March 9, 2010, via Sparrow Records.

=== Run ===
The sixth studio album by the band was released on February 5, 2013, which was called Run, with the lead single "Promises". Shortly after the album's release, both Dan Gartley and Pete Prevost departed the band.

=== The Dream ===
Soon after Jake Rye and Seth Huff replaced Gartley and Prevost. The seventh studio album by the band, The Dream, was released on September 16, 2014. The first video from the album, "Lay It Down", was released to YouTube June 24, 2014. The second lyric video, "Same God", was released by the band on YouTube on October 21, 2014.

On July 1, 2015, it was made clear that Matt Hammitt, who founded the band, was leaving in December after 19 years with the group.

=== Greatest Hits: Best of Sanctus Real ===
The Best of Sanctus Real was released on October 9, 2015, via Capitol Christian (Sparrow/Capitol CMG), and it compiles the band's top hits from their previous seven studio albums, plus one new track recorded specifically for the release.

=== Dustin Lolli: A new era ===
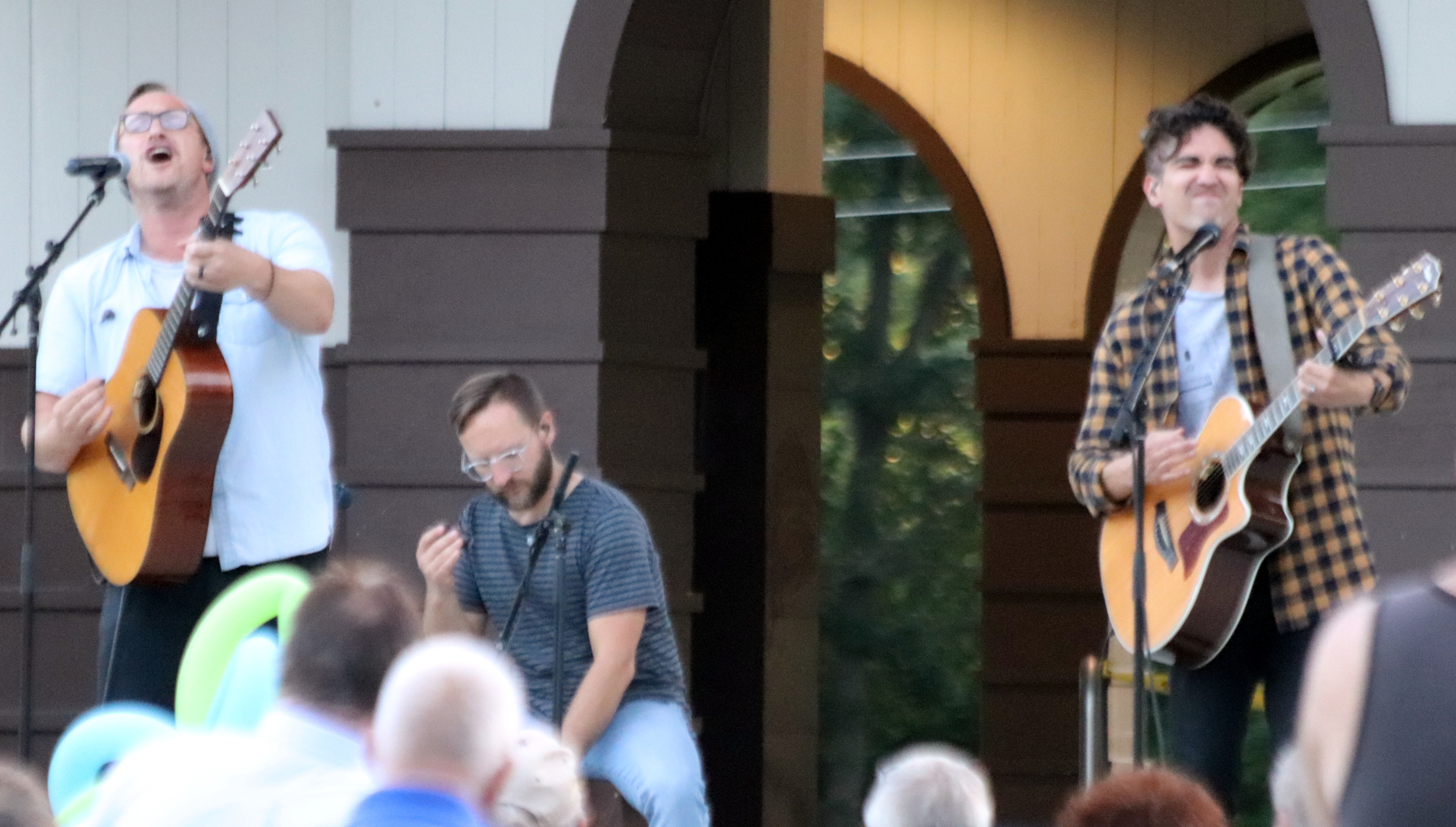
Sanctus Real performing in 2019 with lead singer Dustin Lolli (left)

The band changed their lead vocalist to Dustin Lolli on January 26, 2016, with the first release being an extended play, This Is Love, that was released on February 5, 2016, by the band themselves. On June 16, 2017, they released their first radio single with Lolli, "Safe In My Father's Arms". Changed was released April 27, 2018, on Framework Records, in partnership with Provident Distribution and Essential Music Publishing. The album was met with positive reviews. In August 2018, they signed with Fair Trade Services. The third single from Changed, "Confidence", cracked the top 10 on the Nielsen AC Monitored charts at radio, and was as high as No. 2 on AC indicator.

== Touring ==
In April and May 2010, Sanctus Real debuted the complete new album Pieces of a Real Heart while headlining the UNITED Spring 2010 Tour. Joining them on this 25-city nationwide tour was visionary and speaker David Nasser along with fellow artists Jonny Diaz and MIKESCHAIR. Sanctus Real announced they would be touring with Winter Jam 2012 on the eastern side of the United States. During their 2012 tour, their tour bus burned to the ground. Sanctus posted a photo on their Facebook page on June 3, adding all people got off the bus, but their personal belongings were lost. Sanctus Real began The Run Tour in September 2013 and finished in November 2013.

== Musical style ==
Sanctus Real's main genre is typically labeled as Christian rock and alternative CCM. Their first three independent albums were described by Allmusic as power pop. Say It Loud was characterized by increased guitars and a powerful modern rock style. Their second release, Fight the Tide, was described as "melodic power rock" with similarities to Foo Fighters, Jimmy Eat World, Switchfoot, U2, and PFR. The band's music on The Face of Love blended the styles from their previous two albums, evolving into less of a heavier rock sound. With We Need Each Other, lead singer Matt Hammitt noted that he "just pushed the limits of what I can do vocally" during some songs, "whether it be on a soft, kind of rustic sounding vocal or whether it be this overdriven, rock high-range kind of vocal."

== Members ==
=== Current members ===
- Mark Graalman – drums (1996–present)
- Chris Rohman – guitar (1996–present)
- Dustin Lolli – lead vocalist, keyboard, acoustic guitar (2016–present)

=== Former members ===
- Matt Kollar – bass (1996-1999)
- Steve Goodrum – bass (1999–2005)
- Michael Gee – guitar (1996–1997)
- Dan Gartley – bass and bells (2005–2013)
- Pete Prevost – guitar, banjo, piano (2006–2013)
- Matt Hammitt – lead vocalist, guitar (1996–2015)
- Jake Rye – bass (2013–2016)
- Seth Huff – keyboards, guitar (2014–2017)

== Awards and nominations ==
=== GMA Dove Awards ===
- 2004: Modern Rock Song of the Year ("Beautiful Day") – nominated
- 2005: Modern Rock Album of the Year (Fight the Tide) – won
- 2007: Rock/Contemporary Album of the Year (The Face of Love) – nominated
- 2007: Rock/Contemporary Recorded Song of the Year ("I'm Not Alright") – nominated
- 2011: Song of the Year ("Lead Me") – nominated
- 2011: Pop/Contemporary Recorded Song of the Year ("Lead Me") – nominated
- 2011: Rock/Contemporary Album of the Year (Pieces of a Real Heart) – nominated

=== Grammy Awards ===
- 2009: Grammy Award nomination for Best Rock Gospel Album (We Need Each Other) – nominated
- 2010: Grammy Award nomination for Best Contemporary/Pop Gospel Album (Pieces of a Real Heart) – nominated

== Discography ==
- 1998: All This Talk of Aliens – independent
- 1999: Message for the Masses – independent
- 2001: Nothing to Lose – independent
- 2002: Say It Loud – Sparrow
- 2004: Fight the Tide – Sparrow
- 2006: The Face of Love – Sparrow
- 2008: We Need Each Other – Sparrow
- 2010: Pieces of a Real Heart – Sparrow
- 2010: Pieces of Our Past: The Sanctus Real Anthology – Sparrow
- 2013: Run – Sparrow
- 2014: The Dream – Sparrow
- 2016: This Is Love (EP) – independent
- 2018: Changed – Framework
- 2019: Unstoppable God – Framework/Fair Trade
- 2024: All Along – Framework/The Fuel Music
