= R&R (magazine) =

American weekly music trade publication that followed the radio industry

- Cover for the final issue of R&R
- First issue: August 11, 2006 (19 years ago)
- Final issue: June 5, 2009 (16 years ago)
- Language: English
- Website: Official website (as of June 2, 2009)
- ISSN: 0277-4860
- OCLC: 815648421

R&R (also known as the "new" Radio & Records) was a weekly music trade publication that followed the radio industry and tracked the monitoring of current songs by format, station and audience cumes. The magazine was a sister publication to Billboard magazine and was mostly available through subscription to people who work in the radio industry and music chart enthusiasts, as well as various record stores and newsstands. On June 5, 2009, parent company AC Nielsen ceased operations on R&R just short of three years after acquiring the former independent trade periodical. When it ceased publication in 2009, R&R was the successor-in-interest of publications that traced their operations back to 1973.

== History ==
R&R was a newly relaunched version of two different publications: Billboard Radio Monitor and Radio & Records, the latter where the R&R name was adopted from as the trade's "new" name. The move was a result of a merger between Radio & Records, the "original R&R", and Radio Monitor after VNU Media acquired Radio & Records on July 6, 2006.

On July 14, 2006, Billboard Radio Monitor, which originally started out in 1993 as Airplay Monitor, ceased publication with its final issue, while Radio & Records, which originally started in 1973, published its last issue as an independent trade on August 4, 2006. Its first issue under the newly retitled R&R was August 11, 2006, beginning with the official monitored BDS charts ending the week of August 6, 2006.

On June 3, 2009, it was announced that Radio & Records would cease all operations. The website closed down that date, and currently redirects to Billboard.biz. The reason for ending the publication was due to economic factors. Most of the articles and features that had been published in R&R were included in Billboard. Its final published issue was on June 5, 2009.

== Features ==
Among the features and articles that appeared in R&R, there were one for each format, "Street Talk" (which tracked the latest buzz in the radio industry), and daily news from radio and record industry in general. Those features were carried over from Radio & Records.

It also featured the latest weekly BDS monitored music charts and chart data information. Those features were carried over from Billboard Radio Monitor, but it also included the addition of indicators for non-monitored radio markets and Canadian chart airplay that was part of R&R. The overlapping of radio station reporters and format criteria from the former Monitor and R&R were modified in the new R&R.

== Controversy ==
On January 17, 2008, R&R awarded Bob Grant with the Talk Radio Lifetime Achievement Award. Almost immediately, the award was withdrawn, apparently after R&R received derogatory information about Bob Grant. "R&R is sensitive to the diversity of our community and does not want the presentation of an award to Mr. Grant to imply our endorsement of past comments by him that contradict our values and the respect we have for all members of our community," but R&R then invited Al Sharpton to speak, himself the subject of controversy.

== Format panels ==
The list continued using the BDS radio panels that was featured in Billboard Radio Monitor, but the names of the formats were changed after the conversion was completed.

The monitored radio panels are:

=== United States ===
- Top 40:
  - Top 40/CHR
  - Rhythmic
  - Dance
- Adult Contemporary:
  - Hot AC
  - Mainstream AC
- Urban Contemporary:
  - Urban
  - Urban AC
  - Rap
- Country:
  - Country
- Rock:
  - Alternative
  - Active Rock
  - Heritage Rock
  - Triple-A
- Jazz:
  - Smooth Jazz
- Christian:
  - Christian CHR
  - Christian AC
  - Christian Inspo
  - Christian Rock
- Gospel:
  - Gospel
- Latin:
  - Latin Rhythm
  - Latin Pop
  - Regional Mexican
  - Tropical/Salsa

=== Canada ===
- Top 40/CHR
- Hot AC
- Mainstream AC
- AC
- Border Stations
- Country
- Rock

For articles about their predecessors:

- The "Original" Radio & Records (1973-2006)
- Airplay Monitor/Billboard Radio Monitor (1993-2006)
