= Matt Hammitt =

American musician

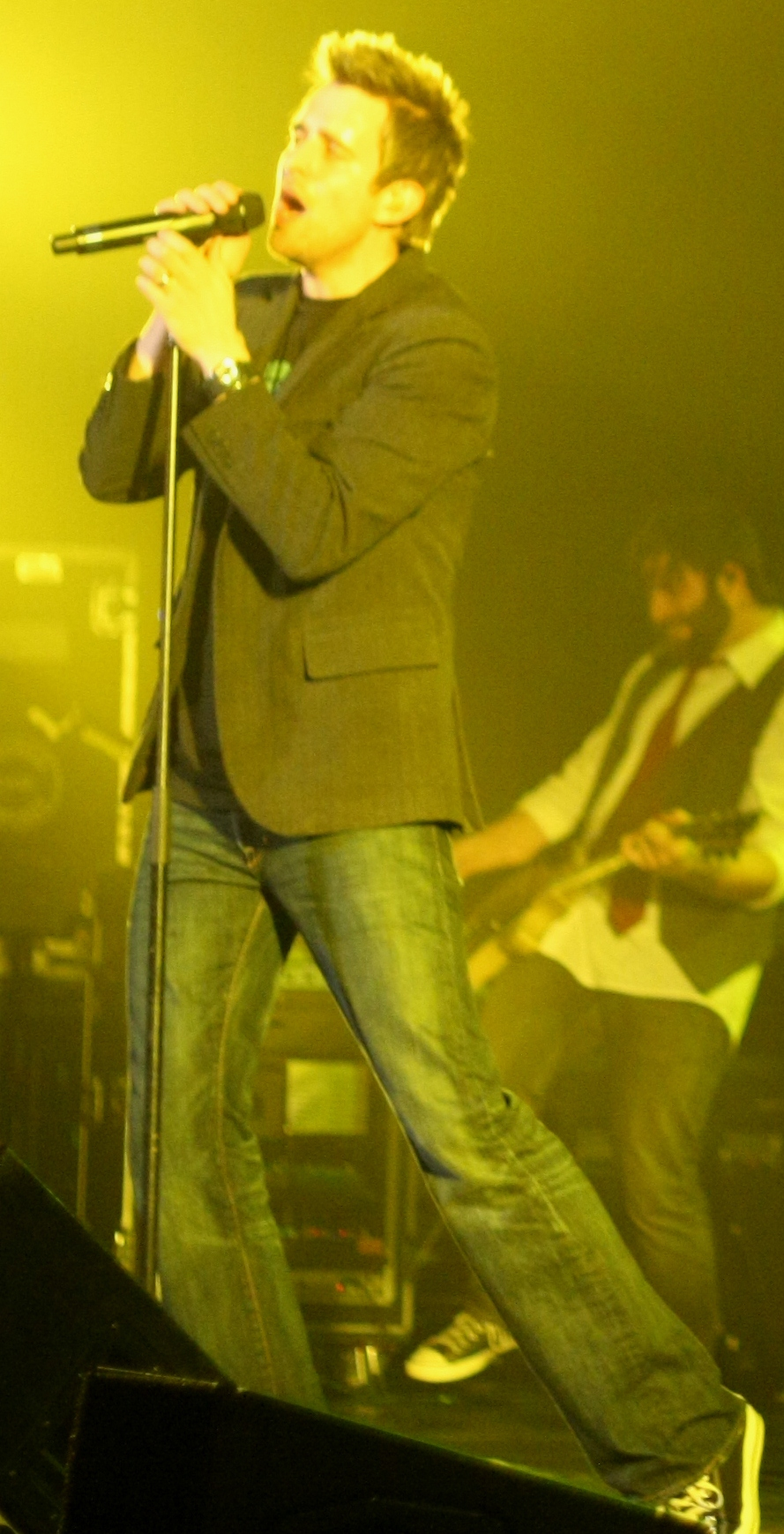
- Hammitt in 2008

Background information
- Born: Matthew Daniel Hammitt; October 19, 1979 (age 46); Toledo, Ohio, U.S.
- Genre: Contemporary Christian
- Occupations: Singer, songwriter
- Instruments: Vocals, guitar
- Years active: 1996–present
- Labels: FCM, Gotee Records
- Website: matthammitt.com

Matt Hammitt (born October 19, 1979) is an American singer, songwriter, speaker and author. He was the lead singer for Sanctus Real, which has released seven studio albums with Sparrow Records, toured internationally and released 14 top five and number one singles to Christian radio. Hammitt left Sanctus Real effective December 2015 to spend more time with his family. He also pursued a solo career. He has since released one solo album, Every Falling Tear.

== Career ==
Hammitt has been the recipient of three Dove Awards, has been nominated for two Grammys for his work with Sanctus Real, and has received multiple awards from SESAC and ASCAP for radio chart performance. He has also co-written songs for other artists, including for King & Country, Francesca Battistelli, Jamie Grace, Newsong, Hawk Nelson, Moriah Peters, Jason Gray, Citizen Way and Love and the Outcome.

Hammitt is also currently a partner with FamilyLife Ministries out of Little Rock, Arkansas, as a speaker for their "Weekend to Remember" marriage retreats.

In July 2016, Hammitt partnered with Seth Mosley's Full Circle Music Company (FCM Records). Hammitt was first signed as a writer for FCM songs, followed by an album deal with FCM Records. His second solo album will be his debut for FCM and was to be released in early 2017.

=== Solo album: Every Falling Tear ===
In September 2010, Hammitt's wife gave birth to their third child, Bowen, who had a life-threatening heart defect. Leading up to Bowen's birth, Hammitt wrote his first solo album, Every Falling Tear (Sparrow Records). The album was released in September 2011, carrying the theme of trusting God in the darkest seasons of life.

=== Compilations ===
- In Christ Alone: Modern Hymns of Worship with Bethany Dillon (2008) Sparrow
- Empty (Disciples) - Dan Haseltine/ Matt Hammitt

=== Children's book ===
In March 2012, Tyndale House Publishers released a hardcover children's book, I Couldn't Love You More, which is based on a song from Hammitt's album Every Falling Tear and co-written by Jason Ingram.

=== Podcast ===
After leaving Sanctus Real, he and his wife launched a podcast called The Lead Me Lifecast, along with "LEAD ME LIVE" conferences and concert events. The events focused on building men, marriages and family. The Lead Me Lifecast is a podcast produced and hosted by Hammitt.

== Personal life ==
Hammitt married Sarah Schooler in mid-2001. They have four children: Emerson Mae Hammitt, Claire Hammitt, Bowen Hammitt, and Lewis Hammitt.

== Discography ==
=== Albums ===
List of studio albums with selected chart positions
Title	Details	Peak chart positions	
Title	Details	US Heat.	US Christ.
Every Falling Tear	Release date: September 13, 2011; Label: Sparrow Records; Formats: CD, digital download, streaming	29	26
Matt Hammitt	Release date: November 17, 2017; Label: Full Circle Music; Formats: CD, digital download, streaming	—	—
Treetop	Release date: September 25, 2020; Label: Showtalker/The Fuel Music; Formats: Digital download, streaming	—	—

=== EPs ===
- Living Room Sessions (Acoustic) - EP (January 25, 2019, Full Circle Music)

=== Singles ===
List of singles with selected chart positions
Title	Year	Peak chart positions		Album
Title	Year	US Christ.	US Christ. Air.	Album
"All of Me"	2011	11		Every Falling Tear
"United Again"	2017	—	—	Non-album single
"Tears"	2017	40	31	Matt Hammitt
"He Always Wins"	2017	—	—	Matt Hammitt
"Like Arrows"	2018	—	—	Non-album single
"Footprints"	2019	—	—	Matt Hammitt
"Whole Heart" (featuring Bowen Hammitt)	2019	—	—	Non-album single
"Try"	2020	—	—	Treetop
"Even Though"	2021	—	—	Non-album singles
"Church Hurt"	2023	—	—	Non-album singles
"Numb"	2023	—	—	Non-album singles
"Packed Up My Love"	2024	—	—	Non-album singles
"No Matter the Cost (Yes)"	2025	—	—	Non-album singles
"Days God Gave"	2025	—	37	Non-album singles
"—" denotes a recording that did not chart or was not released in that territory.

==== As featured artist ====
List of singles with selected chart positions
Title	Year	Peak chart positions		Album
Title	Year	US Christ. Air.	US Christ. AC	Album
"Preach" (Ryan Stevenson featuring Matt Hammitt)	2025	21	17	Valley Lows, Mountain Highs

=== Promotional singles ===
List of promotional singles with selected chart positions
Title	Year	Album
"Could've Been"	2017	Matt Hammitt
"I Saw the Light"	2017	Matt Hammitt
