= Britt Nicole discography =

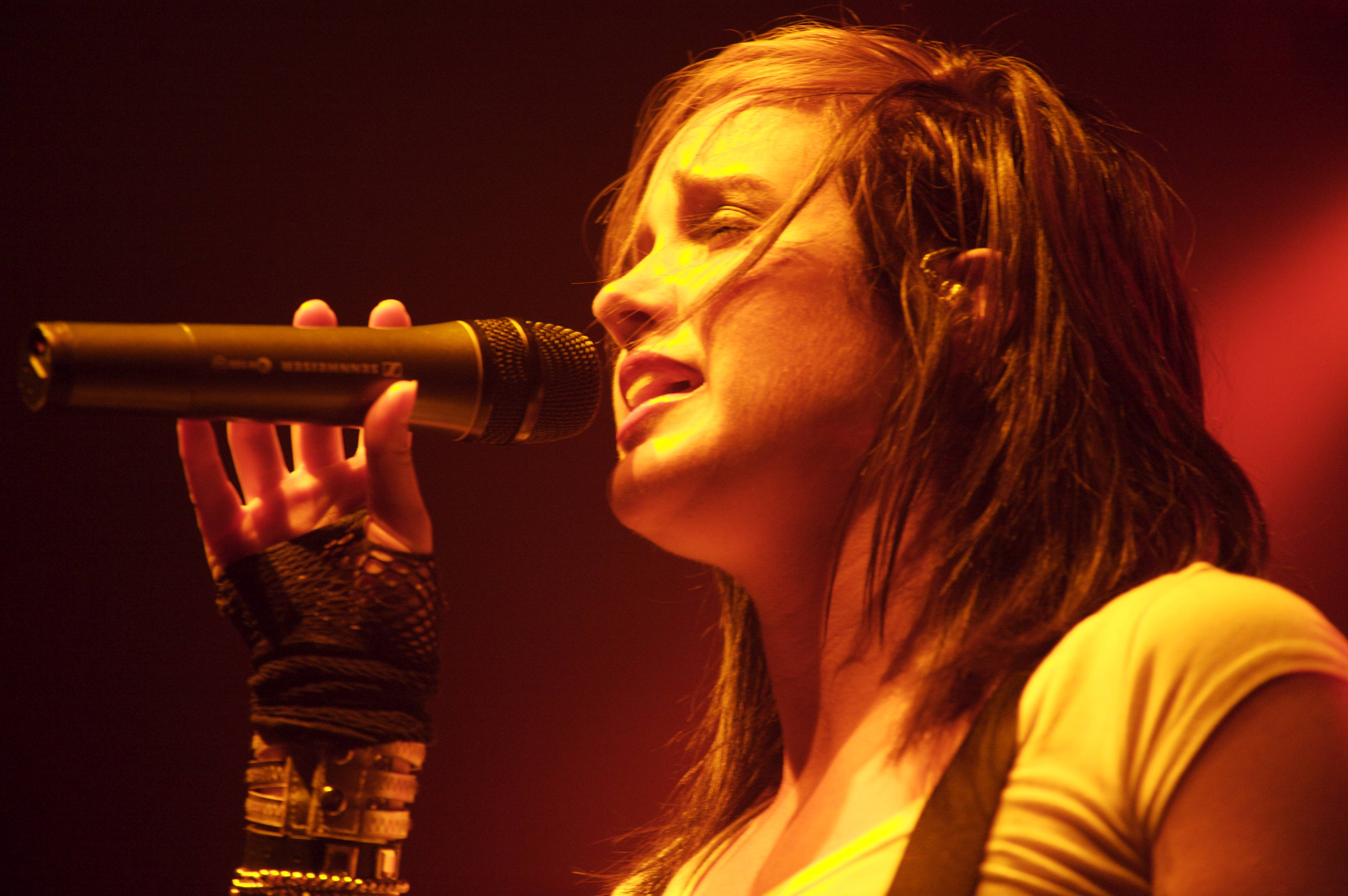
- Nicole performing in Knoxville, TN in 2008.
- Studio albums: 6
- Extended plays: 3
- Compilation albums: 1
- Singles: 21
- Music videos: 8

The discography of Britt Nicole, an American Christian pop singer-songwriter, consists of six studio albums, three extended plays, twenty-one singles, three promotional singles, eight music videos and three album appearances. On May 22, 2007, she released her second album Say It, which peaked at No. 4 on Hot Christian Albums. The debut single from the album, "You", was released on March 27, 2007, and reached the Top 10 on Hot Christian Songs. The second single, "Sunshine Girl", was featured on MTV's teen reality show Newport Harbor: The Real Orange County. Nicole's first music video, for the song "Believe", premiered on the Gospel Music Channel on September 22, 2007. "Set the World On Fire" was released as third single.

The third album, The Lost Get Found, was released on August 11, 2009, and peaked No. 1 on Hot Christian Albums. The same month, a music video for her song "Holiday" surfaced on the internet. Her second single, "Walk on The Water", peaked No. 17 on the Hot Christian Songs. Overseas, the song "Headphones" was promoted as her second single in the United Kingdom. On March 26, 2012, she released her fourth album, Gold. The album debuted at No. 1 on the Hot Christian Albums and 41 on the Billboard 200. The singles "Stand" and "Breakthrough" were released to United States and United Kingdom Christian radio, respectively, in the fall of 2012. The former peaked at No. 11 on U.S. Christian contemporary hit radio and the latter peaked at No. 3 on UK Christian radio. In December 2012, she released two Christmas music videos, "Jingle Bell Rock" and "O Holy Night". Britt Nicole is co-signed to Capitol CMG and released "Gold" as her debut mainstream single on December 4, 2012. The following year Gold was re-released as a mainstream album. In March 2015, she released a full-length remix album, The Remixes. On October 7, 2016, she released her fifth studio album, Britt Nicole.

== Albums ==
=== Studio albums ===
List of studio albums, with selected chart positions
| Title | Album details | Peak chart positions | | | Sales |
| Title | Album details | US | US Christ. | JPN C&G | Sales |
|---|---|---|---|---|---|
| Follow the Call^{[A]} | Released: January 10, 2003; Label: Independent; Formats: CD | — | — | — | |
| Say It | Released: May 22, 2007; Label: Sparrow; Formats: CD, digital download, streaming | — (Note: Say It did not enter the Billboard 200, but did peak at No. 45 on the Heatseekers Albums.) | 40 | 7 | |
| The Lost Get Found | Released: August 11, 2009; Label: Sparrow; Formats: CD, digital download, streaming | 62 | 1 | 1 | |
| Gold | Released: March 26, 2012; Label: Sparrow/Capitol CMG; Formats: CD, digital download, streaming | 41 | 1 | — | US: 124,000 |
| Britt Nicole | Released: October 7, 2016; Label: Capitol CMG; Formats: CD, digital download, streaming | 100 | — | — | |
| II II V | Released: November 20, 2025; Label: Independent; Formats: Digital download, streaming | — | — | — | |
"—" denotes releases that did not chart or were not released in that territory.

=== Remix albums ===
List of compilation albums, with selected chart positions
| Title | Album details | Peak chart positions |
| Title | Album details | US Christ. |
|---|---|---|
| The Remixes | Released: March 17, 2015; Label: Sparrow; Formats: CD, digital download, streaming | 27 |

== Extended plays ==
List of extended plays, with selected chart positions
| Title | Details | Peak chart positions |
| Title | Details | US Christ |
|---|---|---|
| Brittany Waddell^{[A]} | Released: January 10, 2004; Label: Independent; Formats: CD | — |
| Holiday Trio | Released: November 20, 2007; Label: Sparrow; Formats: CD, digital download | — |
| Acoustic | Released: August 24, 2010; Label: Sparrow; Formats: CD, digital download, streaming | 22 |
"—" denotes releases that did not chart or were not released in that territory.

== Singles ==
=== As lead artist ===
List of singles, with selected chart positions and certifications
| Title | Year | Peak chart positions | | | | | | Certifications | Album |
| Title | Year | US | US Pop | US Christ. | US Dance | AUS TRAA | UK Cross | Certifications | Album |
|---|---|---|---|---|---|---|---|---|---|
| "You" | 2007 | — | — | 6 | — | 2 | — | | Say It |
| "Believe" | 2007 | — | — | — | — | — | — | | Say It |
| "Set the World on Fire" | 2008 | — | — | 11 | — | 7 | — | | Say It |
| "Don't Worry Now" | 2009 | — | — | — | — | — | — | | Say It |
| "The Lost Get Found" | 2009 | — | — | 8 | — | — | — | | The Lost Get Found |
| "Walk on the Water" | 2009 | — | — | 17 | — | — | — | | The Lost Get Found |
| "Hanging On" | 2010 | — | — | 19 | — | — | — | | The Lost Get Found |
| "Headphones" | 2011 | — | — | — | — | — | 2 | | The Lost Get Found |
| "All This Time" | 2012 | — | — | 3 | — | 2 | — | | Gold |
| "Stand" | 2012 | — | — | 36 | — | 7 | 2 | | Gold |
| "Gold" | 2012 | 83 | 28 | 16 | 33 | 3 | — | RIAA: Gold | Gold |
| "Ready or Not" (featuring Lecrae) | 2013 | — | — | 25 | — | — | — | | Gold |
| "O Come, All Ye Faithful" | 2013 | — | — | 12 | — | — | — | | WOW Christmas 2013 |
| "The Sun Is Rising" | 2015 | — | — | 26 | — | — | 7 | | Gold |
| "Through Your Eyes" | 2016 | — | — | 20 | — | — | 4 | | Britt Nicole |
| "Be the Change" | 2016 | — | — | 22 | — | — | — | | Britt Nicole |
| "I'll Fight For You" | 2021 | — | — | — | — | — | — | | Non-album singles |
| "Keep Looking Up" (featuring Joe L. Barnes) | 2022 | — | — | — | — | — | — | | Non-album singles |
| "Midnight Hour" | 2024 | — | — | — | — | — | — | | II II V |
| "Keep Going" | 2025 | — | — | — | — | — | — | | II II V |
| "NLMLY" | 2025 | — | — | — | — | 1 | — | | II II V |
"—" denotes releases that did not chart or were not released in that territory.

=== As featured artist ===
List of singles, with selected chart positions and certifications
| Title | Year | Peak chart positions | | Album |
| Title | Year | US Christ. | US Christ. Rock | Album |
|---|---|---|---|---|
| "We Three Kings" (Tenth Avenue North featuring Britt Nicole) | 2013 | 49 | — | WOW Christmas 2013 |
| "Dark Days, Darker Nights" (Tedashii featuring Britt Nicole) | 2014 | — | 15 | Below Paradise |
| "You're Not Alone" (Owl City featuring Britt Nicole) | 2014 | 5 | — | Mobile Orchestra |
"—" denotes releases that did not chart or were not released in that territory.

=== Promotional singles ===
List of singles
| Title | Year | Album |
|---|---|---|
| "Look Like Love" | 2012 | Gold |
| "Pave" | 2016 | Britt Nicole |
| "Faith" | 2025 | II II V |

== Other charted songs ==
List of singles, with selected chart positions and certifications
| Title | Year | Peak chart | Album |
| Title | Year | UK Cross | Album |
|---|---|---|---|
| "Safe" | 2010 | 3 | The Lost Get Found |
| "Have Your Way" | 2010 | 4 | The Lost Get Found |
| "Welcome to the Show" | 2010 | 4 | The Lost Get Found |
| "Breakthrough" | 2012 | 3 | Gold |
| "Seeing for the First Time" | 2013 | 1 | Gold |
| "Amazing Life" | 2013 | 1 | Gold |
| "Holiday (MyKidBrother Remix)" | 2015 | 2 | The Remixes |
| “Glow (J Sapp Remix)” | 2015 | 2 | The Remixes |
| "Fallin In Love" | 2017 | 3 | Britt Nicole |
| "Electric Love" | 2018 | 2 | Britt Nicole |
| "After You" | 2018 | 6 | Britt Nicole |

== Other appearances ==
| Title | Year | Other artist(s) | Album |
|---|---|---|---|
| "Indestructible" | 2006 | —N/a | WOW Next 2007 |
| "Dusk Till Dawn" | 2008 | GRITS | Reiterate |
| "Glow" | 2009 | —N/a | Now Hear This: Fall 2009 |
| "Like a Star" | 2011 | —N/a | Soul Surfer |
| "Set the World on Fire" | 2011 | —N/a | Soul Surfer |
| "Last Christmas" | 2011 | —N/a | WOW Christmas 2011 |
| "Eye On It" | 2012 | tobyMac | Eye On It |
| "Born to Love" | 2013 | Capital Kings | Capital Kings |
| "The Sun is Rising" | 2014 | —N/a | The Other Woman |
| "Can You Hold Me" | 2015 | NF | Mansion |

== Music videos ==
List of music videos, showing director
| Year | Title | Director |
|---|---|---|
| 2007 | "Believe" | Britt Nicole |
| 2009 | "Holiday" | —N/a |
| 2009 | "The Lost Get Found" | —N/a |
| 2010 | "Headphones" | Britt Nicole |
| 2012 | "Gold" | Josh Forbes |
| 2013 | "Eye on It" (TobyMac featuring Britt Nicole) | —N/a |
| 2016 | "Pave" | —N/a |
| 2017 | "Be the Change" | —N/a |

== Notes ==
- A: as Brittany Waddell
