= The Balancing Act =

Studio album by Cool Hand Luke
- Released: February 20, 2007
- Recorded: 1999–August 2006
- Genre: Indie; Alternative rock Pop
- Label: Floodgate Records

Cool Hand Luke chronology
The Fires of Life (2004)	The Balancing Act (2007)	The Sleeping House (2008)

Professional ratings
Review scores
Source	Rating
Allmusic	link

The Balancing Act is a compilation album by indie rock band Cool Hand Luke. It contains songs previously released on the band's albums, EP, and vinyl, plus three new songs. It was released in 2007 on Floodgate Records.

== Track listing ==
1. "The Balancing Act" - 5:17
2. "So Shall It Be" (from Wake Up, O Sleeper) - 4:03
3. "Wonder Tour" - 3:02
4. "Cinematic" (from The Fires of Life) - 5:24
5. "Case of Emergency" (from So Far EP) - 5:42
6. "10 or 40" (from I Fought Against Myself...) - 6:45
7. "Sideways" (from I Fought Against Myself...) - 5:43
8. "A Thank You" (from 7-Inch Vinyl) - 4:44
9. "This Is Love" (from Wake Up, O Sleeper) - 4:58
10. "One Time" (from Wake Up, O Sleeper) - 4:51
11. "I'm Not Ready" (from The Fires of Life) - 5:20
12. "Skydive" (from The Fires of Life) - 5:23
13. "Rest for the Weary" (from 7-Inch Vinyl and The Fires of Life) - 6:23
14. "A Floating Smile" - 3:16
