= Walk on the Water (song) =

"Walk On the Water"

Single by Britt Nicole

from the album The Lost Get Found
- Released: November 2009
- Recorded: 2009
- Genre: Christian pop
- Length: 3:50
- Label: Sparrow
- Songwriters: Britt Nicole, Joshua Crosby, Dan Muckala
- Producer: Dan Muckala

Britt Nicole singles chronology
"The Lost Get Found" (2008)	"Walk On the Water" (2009)	"Hanging On" (2010)

"Walk On the Water" is the second single from Christian pop artist Britt Nicole's third album The Lost Get Found. A ballad pop song, "Walk On the Water" was released in November 2009 to radio. It peaked at No. 1 on Christian radio and No. 17 on Billboard's Hot Christian Songs chart.

== Background ==
The song was written by Britt Nicole, Dan Muckala and Joshua Crosby.

== Chart performance ==
For the week ending January 16, 2010, "Walk On the Water" peaked at No. 17 on Billboard's Hot Christian Songs chart. It stayed on the chart for 23 weeks. The song was also No. 1 on Radio and Records Christian CHR Chart.

== Track listings ==
- Digital download
1. "Walk On the Water" — 3:50

== Other appearances ==
"Walk on the Water" was featured on the album, WOW Hits 2011. She also recorded an acoustic version of the song for her 2010 extended play Acoustic.

In 2015 “Walk on the Water” received the “Phenomenon Remix” by Christian electronic act Soul Glow Activator and was included on Nicole’s first remix album, The Remixes.
