= The Unveiling =

The Unveiling may refer to:

- The Unveiling (album), a 2007 album by Cry of the Afflicted
- The Unveiling (Fear the Walking Dead), an episode of the television series Fear the Walking Dead
