= Celebrate Mistakes =

Studio album by Number One Gun
- Released: August 12, 2003
- Genre: Christian rock, Indie rock
- Label: Floodgate
- Producer: Bob Burch

Number One Gun chronology
| Forever EP (2002) | Celebrate Mistakes (2003) | Promises for the Imperfect (2005) |

Professional ratings
Review scores
| Source | Rating |
|---|---|
| Allmusic | 3/5 stars |
| Jesus Freak Hideout | 3.5/5 stars |
| Punk News | 2.5/5 stars |

Celebrate Mistakes is the first full-length album by American indie rock band Number One Gun, released on August 12, 2003.

== Track listing ==
All tracks are written by Jeff Schneeweis.

| No. | Title | Length |
|---|---|---|
| 1. | "Starting Line" | 2:55 |
| 2. | "Celebrate Mistakes" | 5:05 |
| 3. | "You Fail Sometimes" | 3:34 |
| 4. | "On & On" | 3:39 |
| 5. | "Last Time" | 3:18 |
| 6. | "Invest in You" | 2:48 |
| 7. | "These Things" | 4:40 |
| 8. | "Hear This" | 3:21 |
| 9. | "Get Up (The Way I Feel)" | 3:59 |
| 10. | "This Is All We Know" | 3:52 |
| 11. | "Today Is Described" | 3:32 |
