= Chapters (Forever Changed album) =

Studio album by Forever Changed
- Released: 2006
- Genre: Christian rock
- Label: Floodgate, EastWest
- Producer: Jeremy Griffith, Forever Changed

Forever Changed chronology
The Need to Feel Alive (2002)	Chapters (2006)

Professional ratings
Review scores
Source	Rating
Allmusic	3.5/5 stars

Chapters is the third and last full-length album released by Christian rock band Forever Changed.

== Track listing ==
1. "Chapters"
2. "Never Look Down"
3. "Starting To Sink"
4. "All I Need"
5. "The Runaway"
6. "Time Will Change Everything"
7. "The Disconnect"
8. "It’s Too Late"
9. "Refusal"
10. "No Way Out"
11. "Cradle Eyes"
12. "Letting Go of You"

== Credits ==
- Dan Cole: lead vocals, guitar, piano
- Ben O'Rear: lead guitar, background vocals
- Tom Gustafson: bass guitar
- Nathan Lee: drums
