= The Fires of Life =

Studio album by Cool Hand Luke
- Released: May 25, 2004
- Recorded: January – February 2004
- Genre: Christian rock
- Label: Floodgate Records

Cool Hand Luke chronology
Wake Up, O Sleeper (2003)	The Fires of Life (2004)	The Balancing Act (2007)

Professional ratings
Review scores
Source	Rating
Allmusic	3.5/5 stars
Jesus Freak Hideout	4.5/5 stars

The Fires of Life is the third full-length album by Christian rock band Cool Hand Luke. It was released in 2004 on Floodgate Records. The album peaked at #12 on the Billboard Internet Albums Chart on June 12, 2004.

== Track listing ==
Fires of Life track listing
No.	Title	Length
1.	"Skydive"	5:22
2.	"The Foster"	3:47
3.	"Rats in the Cellar"	3:50
4.	"Cinematic"	5:24
5.	"I'm Not Ready"	5:18
6.	"Sequence #3"	5:24
7.	"Friendly Jas"	5:01
8.	"I'm Not Running"	5:01
9.	"The Zombie Song"	4:43
10.	"Rest for the Weary"	6:24
11.	"The Fires of Life"	4:43
Total length:		54:57
