= Cry of the Afflicted =

Canadian post-hardcore band

- Origin: Kelowna, British Columbia, Canada
- Genres: Post-hardcore, metalcore
- Years active: 2003–2008
- Label: Solid State
- Past members: Garrett Packer; James Johnson; Nik Wagener; Troy Doell; Steve Lockhart

Cry of the Afflicted was a Canadian post-hardcore band from Kelowna, British Columbia.

== History ==
Cry of the Afflicted formed in December 2003. They recorded their first single, "Tale of a Soul", in January 2004 and quickly rose in popularity in their city's local scene. Their first EP, From the Shadows, was released on September 24, 2004, and in the following month the band toured across Canada. Before that they had toured as support for bands such as Misery Signals, Means, Bury Your Dead, and Stutterfly.

Garrett Packer (vocals), James Johnson (guitarist), and Nik Wagner (bassist) had been members of a band called About Face. Nik met Troy Doell (drums) at the beach in 2003 and got talking about music. Troy and Steve Lockhart (guitar) were playing in another Kelowna band. The five of them started jamming together and decided to form a new band. In 2004, they appointed Ethics Industries as their managers and, in 2006, released their first full-length album, Consume This Wasteland.

Cry of the Afflicted signed to Solid State Records on January 30, 2007, and soon recorded a new album with producer Jeff Schneeweis. Released on August 14, 2007, their album The Unveiling contains ten tracks, three of which were previewed on their Myspace and Purevolume websites prior to the CD's release.

We were never a metal or a hardcore band, I'd say we're more of a modern rock band with screaming. We've come almost full circle. At first we were all melody with a small fraction of screaming. When we got on the road, hardcore was the popular thing and we were always the melodic band on the bill.

— Garrett Packer, on the band's musical style,

In December 2007, the band announced that long-time guitarist Steve Lockhart was leaving their group. Lockhart's final show with the band was scheduled December 12, 2007, in their hometown of Kelowna. Tyler Schwindt, of Library, filled-in for the subsequent two-month tour with Emery.

On October 2, 2008, Cry of The Afflicted played what they said was most likely to be their last show. They had no plans to write or record a new album at that time and plan to be in hiatus until further notice. At this show the band also used their former guitarist Steve Lockhart. In April 2008, bassist Nik Wagener, along with four others, started a band called Moments. In October 2009, the band announced a one-night only reunion show in West Kelowna where they opened for a local band called Reflection.

== Former members ==
- Garrett Packer – vocals (2003–2008)
- Nik Wagener – bass & vocals (2003–2008)
- Troy Doell – drums (2003–2008)
- James Johnson – guitar (2003–2008)
- Steve Lockhart – guitar (2003–2007)

== Discography ==
=== Albums ===
- Consume This Wasteland (2006)
- The Unveiling (Solid State, 2007)

=== EPs ===
- From the Shadows EP (2004)

== Awards and recognition ==
GMA Canada Covenant Awards

- 2008 nominee, Hard Music Album of the Year: The Unveiling
- 2008 nominee, Hard Music Song of the Year: "A Scar Filled Sky"

== See also ==
- List of bands from Canada
