= Conveyer (band) =

American metalcore band

- Origin: Eau Claire, Wisconsin
- Genres: Melodic hardcore, metalcore
- Years active: 2011–2017
- Label: Victory
- Members: Danny Adams; Jared Evangelista; John Gaskill; Jake Smithy
- Past members: Carter Daniels; Jake Haag; Bryan Maloney; Ben Greene; Daniel Glover; Nick Matako; Ty Brooks
- Website: facebook.com/CONVEYER

Conveyer is an American metalcore band from Eau Claire, Wisconsin. The band started making music in 2011. They self released their first album, Worn Out in 2013, and studio album, When Given Time to Grow, in 2015, through Victory Records.

The band released their new record No Future on June 23, 2017 via Victory Records. The band recorded at Silver Bullet Studios with Greg Thomas (Misery Signals, Shai Hulud, With Honor) and Chris Teti (The World Is a Beautiful Place & I Am No Longer Afraid to Die).

== Background ==
The band is a melodic hardcore group formed in Eau Claire, Wisconsin, from 2011. The band released two full-length records, Worn Out (Self-Released in 2013) and When Given Time To Grow (2015 via Victory Records). After releasing Worn Out in 2013, frontman Daniels left the group to go back to school and get married. The band reached out to Indianapolis, Indiana native, Danny Adams, formerly of All Became New. He brought along with him, fellow ABN member Daniel Glover on drums, and the group added guitarist, Nick Matako, before they signed with Victory Records.

Conveyer has toured relentlessly since 2013, including tours with: Ghost Key (No Sleep Records), Until We Are Ghosts (InVogue Records), Dwell (Blood & Ink Records), Household (Blood & Ink Records), Gatherers (Equal Vision Records), High Hopes (Victory Records), Comrades (Facedown Records), Colossus (Facedown Records), Strengthen What Remains (Blood & Ink Records), Prophets, Dependence (InVogue Records), Motives (InVogue Records), Letter to the Exiles (Facedown Records), We the Gathered (Facedown Records), and Reap & Sow (Cognitive Dissonance).

In 2017, Conveyer added bassist Jake Smith and John Gaskill (formerly of Life In Your Way) upon the departures of Ben Greene and Daniel Glover.

== Music history ==
The band formed in 2011, playing regionally throughout the first few years in the midwest. The band released 3 EPs (Signal Fire, Empty Handed & MMXII) before self-releasing Worn Out, on December 31, 2013. After releasing Worn Out, Bryan Maloney, Carter Daniels and Jacob Haag all exited the band to pursue their careers outside of the band. The band added Danny Adams and Daniel Glover and quickly caught the attention of Victory Records. Their subsequent release, When Given Time to Grow, was released on September 4, 2015, through Victory Records.

== Members ==
Current members

- Danny Adams – vocals (2014–present) (ex-All Became New)
- Ty Brooks – guitar (2011–present)
- Nick Matako – guitar (2014–present)
- John Gaskill – drums (2016–present) (ex-Life In Your Way, Endeavor)

Past members

- Jake Haag – guitar (2011-2014)
- Bryan Maloney – drums (2011-2014)
- Nicolai Wallace - bass (2011-2013)
- Carter Daniels – vocals (2012-2014)
- Ben Greene – bass (2013-2016)
- Daniel Glover – drums (2014-2016) (ex-All Became New)
- Jake "Jakey" Smith - bass (2016-2018)

Timeline

== Discography ==
Studio albums

- When Given Time to Grow (September 4, 2015, Victory)
- No Future (June 23, 2017, Victory)

Independent albums

- Worn Out (December 31, 2013)
