= Kiev (band) =

American indie rock band

- Origin: Orange, California
- Genres: Alternative rock; Progressive rock; Experimental rock
- Years active: 2007 – present
- Spinoffs: Never Ending Coyotes
- Members: Andrew Stavas; Brandon Corn; Derek Poulsen; Robert Brinkerhoff
- Past members: Alex Wright
- Website: www.kievband.com

Kiev is an American indie rock band from Orange, California. It consists of members Andrew Stavas (keys, saxophone), Brandon Corn (drums, percussion), Derek Poulsen (bass, computers), and Robert Brinkerhoff (guitar, vocals). They self-released their first EP titled Ain't No Scary Folks In On Around Here in 2010, which Los Angeles radio station KROQ characterized as "like having your ear work on a good puzzle". Their first single "Crooked Strings" received airplay on KROQ's Locals Only show.

The band's second EP was released in 2011, titled Be Gone Dull Cage & Others. They were named "Best Indie Band" at the 2011 Orange County Music Awards. Los Angeles blog Buzzbands.LA described their sound as "trippy and cerebral at the same time, occupying that sometimes-exhilarating, sometimes-discomfiting space between left and right brain".

Kiev's first full-length album, Falling Bough Wisdom Teeth, was released on October 22, 2013 by Suspended Sunrise Recordings. In November 2014, the band's single "Be Gone Dull Cage" was featured on The Walking Dead episode "Slabtown".

== Live performances ==
On May 24, 2011, at the Orange County Performing Arts Center, Kiev debuted a live stereoscopic 3-D set with visuals projected and choreographed to their music. The live 3-D show was performed for the second time on September 22, 2011 at Avalon Hollywood as part of the 2011 Los Angeles 3-D Film and Music Festival. The band was awarded the festivals "3DFF Pioneer Award" for their performance that night.

== Discography ==
Albums

- Falling Bough Wisdom Teeth (2013)

EPs

- Ain't No Scary Folks In On Around Here (2010)
- Be Gone Dull Cage & Others (2011)

Singles

- "Be Gone Dull Cage (Walker Version)" (2014)
- "Willing Eyes" (2019)
