= The Lost Get Found (song) =

Single by Britt Nicole

from the album The Lost Get Found
- Released: June 16, 2009
- Recorded: 2009
- Genre: Christian pop; pop rock
- Length: 3:25
- Label: Sparrow
- Songwriters: Britt Nicole, Ben Glover
- Producer: Dan Muckala

Britt Nicole singles chronology
"Don't Worry Now" (2009)	"The Lost Get Found" (2009)	"Walk on the Water" (2009)

"The Lost Get Found" is the lead single from Christian pop artist Britt Nicole's third album The Lost Get Found. A mid-tempo pop song, "The Lost Get Found" was released on June 16, 2009, to digital stores. It peaked at No. 1 on Christian radio and No. 8 on Billboard's Hot Christian Songs chart.

== Background ==
The song was written by Britt Nicole and Ben Glover. Lyrically, the track speaks of stepping out for Christ.

== Chart performance ==
For the week ending August 22, 2009, "The Lost Get Found" peaked at No. 8 on Billboard's Hot Christian Songs chart. It stayed on the chart for 11 weeks. The song was also No. 1 on Radio and Records Christian CHR Chart for eight consecutive weeks.

== Critical reception ==
Professional ratings
Review scores
Source	Rating
AllMusic	4/5 stars

New Release Today's Kevin Davis described "The Lost Get Found" as "a wonderful song of encouragement to live as a light and know that in Christ we can do anything."

== Music video ==
The official video for the song was released on YouTube October 30, 2009. It was later released to iTunes on November 17. The video follows Britt taking a road trip and telling real people about Jesus Christ.

== Track listings ==
- Digital download
1. "The Lost Get Found" — 3:25
- Digital extended play
1. "The Lost Get Found" (Karaoke) - 3:21
2. "The Lost Get Found" (Remix) - 3:43
3. "The Lost Get Found" (Music Video) - 3:34

== Other appearances ==
"The Lost Get Found" was featured on the album, WOW Hits 2010. She also recorded an acoustic version of the song for her 2010 extended play Acoustic.

In 2015 “The Lost Get Found” was remixed by Christian electronic artist Neon Feather and featured on Nicole’s first remix album, The Remixes.

== Charts ==
Chart performance for "The Lost Get Found"
Chart (2009)	Peak position
US Hot Christian Songs (Billboard)	8
US Christian Airplay (Billboard)	8
US Christian AC (Billboard)	9
