= To the Secrets and Knowledge =

Studio album by Number One Gun
- Released: January 26, 2010
- Genre: Alternative rock, Christian rock
- Length: 32:52
- Label: Tooth & Nail
- Producer: Jeff Schneeweis

Number One Gun chronology
The North Pole Project (2008)	To the Secrets and Knowledge (2010)	This Is All We Know (2014)

Professional ratings
Review scores
Source	Rating
Allmusic	3.5/5 stars
DecoyMusic	2/5 stars
Jesus Freak Hideout	3/5 stars
Sputnikmusic	3/5 stars

To the Secrets and Knowledge is the fourth studio album by the Christian rock band Number One Gun. It was originally released under Tooth & Nail Records on January 26, 2010.

== Track listing ==
1. "The Victory" - 3:08
2. "Big Machines" - 3:29
3. "Forest" - 4:05
4. "Noises" - 2:44
5. "Hey Stranger" - 3:01
6. "The People" - 2:35
7. "White Lies" - 3:20
8. "Look to Pass" (Instrumental) - 3:06
9. "Try It" - 3:13

=== Album changes ===
The original version of the album included a tenth track which was a cover of "Don't Stop Believin'" by Journey. In February 2010, the album was removed from iTunes and stores due to "content issues". Although the band announced that it would substitute the cover song for a new final track, the album was re-released on April 20, 2010 with only nine tracks.
