= The North Pole Project =

Studio album by Number One Gun
- Released: January 15, 2008
- Studio: Compound Studios, Seattle, Washington
- Genre: Christian rock, alternative rock, emo
- Length: 31:35
- Label: Tooth & Nail
- Producer: Jeff Schneeweis

Number One Gun chronology
Promises for the Imperfect (2005)	The North Pole Project (2008)	To the Secrets and Knowledge (2010)

Professional ratings
Review scores
Source	Rating
Jesus Freak Hideout	link

The North Pole Project is the third studio album by the Christian rock band Number One Gun. It was released under Tooth & Nail Records on January 15, 2008.

== History ==
After Number One Gun decided to split up in 2006 all four former members went their own directions. Jeff Schneeweis started a band called "The North Pole Project", which would later be his inspiration for the name of this album. Sometime later Schneeweis was approached by Tooth & Nail Records and asked to release his music under the name Number One Gun. When Schneeweis agreed to the deal he began his work on the new Number One Gun album, "The North Pole Project", as a solo record.

== Track listing ==
1. "The Massacre" - 3:12
2. "Million" - 2:57
3. "The Best of You and Me" - 3:49
4. "Wake Me Up" - 3:59
5. "Bad Habits" - 2:54
6. "I'll Find You" - 3:00
7. "Thank You Ending" - 2:42
8. "Find Your Escape" - 2:25
9. "The Different Ones" - 3:10
10. "This Holiday" - 3:27
