= This Is All We Know =

Studio album by Number One Gun
- Released: January 14, 2014
- Genre: Alternative rock, Christian rock
- Length: 36:01
- Label: Tooth & Nail
- Producer: Jeff Schneeweis

Number One Gun chronology
To the Secrets and Knowledge (2010)	This Is All We Know (2014)

Professional ratings
Review scores
Source	Rating
Jesus Freak Hideout	3/5 stars
I AM TUNED UP	4.5/5 stars

This Is All We Know is the fifth studio album released by American Christian rock band Number One Gun. It was released on Tooth & Nail Records on January 14, 2014 after being successfully funded on Kickstarter. Unlike the two previous albums, which were solo projects by Jeff Schneeweis, this album features the original band members, who also created a "making of" album documentary for Kickstarter backers.

== Track listing ==
1. "Get a Little Weird - 3:01
2. "Make This Last Forever" - 2:56
3. "It" - 3:52
4. "Heartbeats" - 3:11
5. "Make a Movie" - 3:36
6. "Life in the Middle" - 3:08
7. "Disappear" (featuring Stephen Christian) - 2:37
8. "Perfect Ones" - 2:55
9. "For You" (featuring Sarah Ann) - 3:13
10. "Dark" - 3:53
11. "I'm on Fire" - 3:44

== Kickstarter history and controversy ==
The Kickstarter campaign was created on July 5, 2012 with a goal of $25,000. By August 4, the goal was met, and contributions had reached $25,852. The band initially promised a delivery date of February 2013, but communicated in a backers-only update on the 13th of that month that the album would be delayed because the band members wanted to write a few more songs. On July 5 another update went out revealing that the album was complete, and on October 31 the band said that although they were releasing with Tooth & Nail Records the following January, backers would receive the album digitally in November. The first download link was sent on November 27, 2013.

The first backer update regarding CD/DVD/poster/T-shirt packages was sent on January 13, 2014, indicating that they would be sent "very soon". On March 18, another update was posted acknowledging that the packages had not yet been sent, indicating that it was due to the DVD process not yet having been finished. On December 12, 2014, a backer update was posted saying that the packages would be sent the following January. However, radio silence continued until March 5, 2015, where Jeff sent another update apologizing for no one having received their rewards and being "ashamed at how long this has taken" but promising to release them "ASAP". The last communication through Kickstarter was on November 9, 2015, where a final apology was made.

Throughout this process, many backers expressed increasing frustration with the state of affairs, some going as far as to suggest taking legal actions against the band. Others tried to take a direct approach by messaging Jeff through various social media outlets, and on April 26, 2016, a backer posted that they had received their reward package, making it three years and eight months since the project was funded. As of February 26, 2021, some users still had not received their rewards.
