= East West (band) =

American Christian rock band

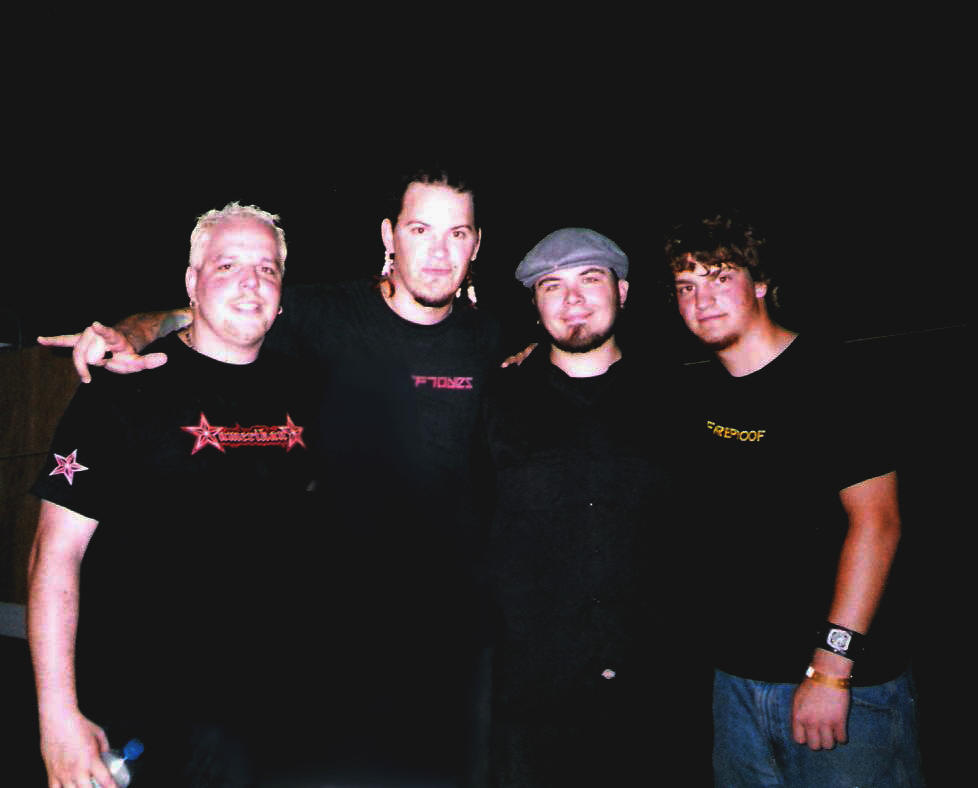
- East West's latest lineup, from approximately 2002.

Background information
- Origin: Irvine, California, United States
- Genres: Hardcore punk, hard rock, nu metal
- Years active: 1993–2006
- Labels: Floodgate, Epic, WEA-Warner Brothers
- Members: Mike Tubbs; Bobby "Vee" Vergura; John Druse; James "J.J." Jenkins
- Past members: Mike "House" Housen; Joe Fulford; David Barrs; Dave Detloff; Eric Kieselhorst; Stan Barrett; Ralph Lamagna; David Pryor; Ken James; Paul "Boomer" Droste; Paul "Soth" Nasfell; Ben Dacanay; Ted Su

East West was an American Christian rock band from Irvine, California, United States, who later re-located to Corona. The band takes its name from the Bible verse Psalms 103:12.

While many members were replaced during East West's timeline, the best-known line-up included Mike Tubbs (vocals, guitar), Mike "House" Housen (guitar, vocals), James "JJ" Jenkins (electric bass, vocals), Bobby "Vee" Vegura (drums, percussion, vocals). In 2002, prior to the band's first US Tour, Housen departed and was replaced by Jon Druse.

In the May–June 2003 issue of HM Magazine, Mike Tubbs said, "We have been writing and taking time off to enjoy the more important things in life, our families. We really spent the three years traveling the world and the States and now it's time to focus on home. So, we are going to work on writing new songs, re-connecting with our fans and, like I said, our families."

== Early history ==
East West was formed in 1988 in the San Fernando Valley, by Mike Housen (guitar, backing vocals), Eric Kieselhorst (vocals), Stan Barrett (guitar and keyboard and back vocals) and Ralph Lamagna (drums). Bassist David Pryor joined the band in 1989. The band's song "Southern Dawn" was in KROQ-FM's rotation. The band played frequently at the Sunset Strip and opened for well-known bands at the time Mary's Danish and Warrant. In 1990 Housen moved to orange county and formed "Tears for Jane" (EuroBeat) with Ken James at vocals. Housen reformed East West in 1991. This version consisted of Housen (vocals, guitar), Dave Barrs (guitar), Bob Vergura (drums) and Dave Detloff (bass).

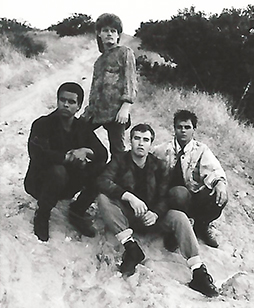
Original Members of EastWest

In 1992, Housen crossed paths with Mike Tubbs, a friendship evolved, and Tubbs eventually joined the band as guitarist. East West was then redefined as a rapcore band with strong melodies, three-part harmonies and heavy extreme metal influences. At this point, the other members were Paul "Boomer" Droste (drums) and Paul "Soth" Nasfell (bass, vocals). Together, they recorded a five-song demo, which was released in 1995. During this period, Housen provided lead vocals.

Ben Dacanay (drums) replaced Droste in 1995 after the band's first show at the Whiskey (where they released their untitled 5-song EP) and Ted Su (bass) replaced Nasfell in 1996 when Nasfell left the band for family reasons. East West continued to evolve musically, and recorded Rachel's Silence (released in 1996) and an unreleased studio album in 1997. Shortly after, Dacanay and Su left the group. It was around this time that Housen decided to focus more on guitar and songwriting, while Tubbs became the lead vocalist. The band then re-located to Corona, California. Housen departed East West in 2003.

== From Garage to Reality ==
East West was always dedicated to creating music that spoke to human struggles and offered encouragement in some capacity. Even when practicing in their home garage studio, they imagine playing before millions and kept their sights focused on this single goal. The band spent years promoting, booking, and playing shows; gaining thousands of local fans and growing the East West family. It was only a matter of time before a local record label picked them up and helped to thrust them into the next part of their career. Enter Floodgate records. A small indie label headquartered in Orange County, California founded by Tim Tabor, formerly of The Prayer Chain (Band).

After signing to Floodgate records, label manager Tim Tabor told band members he would have them signed to a major label within six months. While the label went to work, so did the band. They kept up their regimen of local shows and songwriting. Sometime in the spring of 2001 the band received an invitation to visit the Epic-Song offices in Malibu, California where they were met by a welcoming bunch of record label folks who were dedicated to helping East West climb to the next level. This invitation happened almost three months to the day record label owner Time Tabor had promised to get them signed.

East West, prior to signing with Epic-Sony, planned and executed a record release party for their record "A Light in Guinevere's Garden" at the famous Glass House in Pomona, California. The show drew some three thousand attendees who came to see not only the band, but friends bands who were invited to play the release party. East West sold over three hundred records that night along with merch and spent hours talking with fans, both new and old.

Epic-Sony planned an additional record release at the Triangle Square in Costa Mesa, California at the Virgin Megastore which ended up being shut down by the Costa Mesa PD for noise pollution. The band still performed a number of songs off their latest record to waiting fans before being forced to shutdown. This event marked a decline in Epic-Sony's involvement in the band. Speaking candidly during a closed doors interview, the band agreed that it was most likely "due to record sales numbers being low" at the Triangle Square event. [There is a video floating around on the internet somewhere of this event]

East West was signed for six months with Epic-Sony and the day the contract ended a new contract was signed with Word/Warner Bros. The band could not have been more happy, as this came on the cusp of the news of an invite to Nashville, TN., for a massive recording industry convention. Unfortunately, band members hit a tipping point internally and Housen left the band just two weeks before the band was set to leave for Nashville. Producer and friend of the band, Bob Burch recommended a budding young guitarist named Jon Druse to the band. With less than two days notice, Jon came out to Bobby's house in Corona, California for a play through of the band's current set. He nailed everything, complete with effects. The band was ready for Nashville.

East West was interviewed by Steelroots (Rocket Town Records and performed a number of industry showcases as well as public shows. This endeavor to Nashville paid off for the band as they were nominated for "Best New Hard Rock Album of the Year" for the Gospel Music Association (GMA). While preparing to board their flight home, Bobby received a phone call from home letting him know the band had not only been nominated, but won the award.

The band returned home and immediately began playing shows again, all while still working fulltime jobs. Shortly after returning home a tour contact came in which would launch the band on a three month whirlwind across the states. The lineup was a surefire win for audiences and gave opportunity for solid friendships between the bands. Headlining was Pillar, supported by The Benjamin Gate, a fantastic act from South Africa, followed by East West. This tour would help launch the band into the touring scene and give way to many shows to come. It was at this time that international attention became apparent to the band. One such show was Flevo Festival in Liempde, Holland. Another opportunity within a few short months was found in Germany at Christmas Rock Night (CRN). When the band returned to the states, they launched out on a number of short tours. One of these tours landed the band in Washington, D.C. playing for XM Radio.

== Hope In Anguish ==
Hope in Anguish was a record which was a long time in the making, but came together in just a few short weeks. It embodied both the excitement of a new lineup in the band with Jon on guitar and also the challenges of the band finding themselves after being thrust into touring. While the band themselves admitted they would have liked to spend more time on post-production/mixing HIA, they feel it was really a stepping stone for what was to come. The band produced and released a production video for the track "Vacant" and hoped to release more. However, before the band could get back into the studio to record their next record, Mike Tubbs would announce the end of the band at what would be their final show in Corona Del Mar, California; Spirit West Coast.

== Discography ==
1. East West Demo - Not for Resale EP (1995) (Independent)
2. Rachel's Silence (1996) (TISUMI Records)
3. Untitled (1997) (TISUMI Records) (Unreleased)
4. East West (1998) (Backbone Records)
5. The Light in Guinevere's Garden (2001) (Floodgate Records)
6. Vintage (East West re-release) (2003) (Floodgate)
7. Hope in Anguish (2003) (Floodgate)

== Other sources ==
- Powell, Mark Allan (2002). Encyclopedia of Contemporary Christian Music (First printing ed.). Peabody, Massachusetts: Hendrickson Publishers. p. 288. ISBN 1-56563-679-1.
- McGovern, Brian Vincent (January–February 1999). "Indie Album Reviews: EAST WEST". HM Magazine (75). Archived from the original on July 13, 2001.
