= The Need to Feel Alive =

Studio album by Forever Changed
- Released: 2005
- Genre: Christian rock, pop punk
- Producer: James Paul Wisner

Forever Changed chronology
The Existence EP (2004)	The Need to Feel Alive (2005)	Chapters (2006)

The Need to Feel Alive is the second full-length album released by Forever Changed. It was released in 2005.

== Track listing ==
1. "The Last Time"
2. "Encounter"
3. "The Need to Feel Alive"
4. "Something More"
5. "Great Divide"
6. "Romance in Denial"
7. "The Vanity Letter"
8. "Opportunity (We Could Be the Ones)"
9. "Identical"
10. "Alone"
11. "Knowledge"
12. "Consequences (b-side)"

== Credits ==
- Dan Cole – lead vocals, guitar, piano
- Ben O'Rear – lead guitar, background vocals
- Tom Gustafson – bass guitar
- Nathan Lee – drums
