= II II V =

Studio album by Britt Nicole
- Released: November 20, 2025
- Recorded: 2018–2025
- Genres: Christian pop; R&B; gospel
- Length: 57:11
- Label: Independent
- Producers: Britt Nicole, Chris Stevens, Jeff Schneeweis

Britt Nicole chronology
Britt Nicole (2016)	II II V (2025)

Singles from II II V
- 1. "Midnight Hour" Released: November 22, 2024; 2. "Keep Going" Released: January 24, 2025; 3. "NLMLY" Released: February 28, 2025

II II V is the sixth studio album by the American Christian pop musician Britt Nicole. It was released independently on November 20, 2025 and is Nicole's first album in nearly ten years. It was produced by Nicole herself alongside Chris Stevens and Jeff Schneeweis. The album's title (Roman numerals for 2, 2 and 5) is a reference to Joel 2:25, a verse she cites as inspiration behind both her personal life and the album's themes of restoration.

II II V was supported with the release of three singles, including "Midnight Hour" on November 22, 2024, "Keep Going" on January 24, 2025, and "NLMLY" on February 28, 2025, as well as one promotional single, "Faith", on May 16, 2025. "NLMLY" enjoyed commercial success in Australia, where it spent several weeks atop the TCM Australian Christian Airplay in 2026.

== Background and title ==
After a nearly ten-year absence from music and departure from mainstream label Capitol Records, Britt Nicole announced her sixth studio album in May 2025. II II V was released independently on November 20, 2025. The album is split into three thematic parts, The Bridge, The Crossing and The Promise. The Bridge spans the first ten songs on the album and was recorded entirely in California. The second part, The Crossing, includes songs eleven to thirteen and was recorded in Nashville, Tennessee. II II V's final nine songs make up the third part, The Promise, and were recorded at Nicole's home studio in Chattanooga, Tennessee. Stylistically the first two thirds of II IIV blend pop, R&B, and gospel while the closing nine songs feature only Nicole's vocals and piano.

When asked about the album title, Nicole responded to New Zealand's LifeFM by saying "Joel 2:25 is a scripture that I have just been holding onto for a long time. It says, "I will restore to you the years"...I've seen that in my life recently. I feel like I'm still seeing that just where God is bringing things full circle...I just think that is an amazing thing that God can do that. People can give back things but only God can give back time...It's really cool over the last seven years...I kept seeing that number (2,2,5) even the last studio that we worked in... right above the door it said '225'...I feel like God speaks to me in that way. He shows me over and over again. I knew there was significance to that number '225' even before I found that scripture. The whole album is about so many different things but the theme of that time in my life and even what I'm walking into is: seeing God restore things in my life".

== Track listing ==
All tracks are written by Britt Nicole and Jeff Schneeweis unless otherwise noted.

Part 1: The Bridge
No.	Title	Length
1.	"NLMLY"	2:59
2.	"Midnight Hour"	3:24
3.	"God's Timing"	1:19
4.	"Keep Going"	2:49
5.	"Pray"	3:24
6.	"Clarion"	3:36
7.	"Faith"	3:40
8.	"Shadow"	2:40
9.	"How Loved You Are"	3:40
10.	"Bridge"	3:37

Part II: The Crossing
No.	Title	Writer(s)	Length
11.	"Full Circle"	Ariel Lantigua; Nicole; Chris Stevens; Nahuel Gonzalez; Nestor Amparo	2:27
12.	"Jesus You Saved Me"	Lantigua; Nicole; Gonzalez; Amparo	3:50
13.	"One Thing"	Schneeweis; Lantigua; Nicole; Gonzalez; Amparo	4:28

Part III: The Promise
No.	Title	Writer(s)	Length
14.	"I Will Give You Rest"	Lantigua; Nicole	1:26
15.	"Tis So Sweet To Trust In Jesus"	Lantigua; Nicole	1:25
16.	"Great Is Thy Faithfulness"	Lantigua; Nicole	1:48
17.	"Anywhere"	Lantigua; Nicole	2:55
18.	"God Is With Me"	Nicole	0:34
19.	"Mystery"	Nicole	1:08
20.	"All My Love"	Nicole	1:01
21.	"Victory"	Nicole	1:04
22.	"Hallelujah"	Nicole	3:47
Total length:			57:11

== Personnel ==
=== Musicians ===
- Britt Nicole - all vocals, piano (14–22)
- Jeff Schneeweis - bass, drums, guitar

=== Production ===
- Jeff Schneeweis - producer (1–10, 13)
- Chris Stevens - producer (11)
- Ariel Lantigua - producer (11, 12, 13)
- Nestor Amparo - producer (11–19, 21, 22)
- Britt Nicole - producer (14–22)
