= All This Time (Britt Nicole song) =

Single by Britt Nicole

from the album Gold
- Released: January 31, 2012
- Studio: Fabmusic, Franklin, Tennessee
- Genre: Pop rock; CCM
- Length: 3:23
- Label: Sparrow
- Songwriters: David Garcia; Ben Glover; Britt Nicole
- Producers: David Garcia; Christopher Stevens

Britt Nicole singles chronology
| "Headphones" (2011) | "All This Time" (2012) | "Stand" (2012) |

"All This Time" is a song by contemporary Christian musician Britt Nicole from her fourth album, Gold. It was released on January 31, 2012, as the first single from the album.

== Background ==
This song was produced by David Garcia and Christopher Stevens, and was written by Garcia, Ben Glover, and Britt Nicole. The song was recorded at Fabmusic in Franklin, Tennessee.

The song is about her life growing up and to the present day, when as a seven-year-old girl, her life was torn apart by her parents' divorce. During this time, she kept feeling God's presence in her life, specifically when she opened her 'Precious Moments' Bible. Additionally, Nicole said this song is about when she moved to Nashville to pursue her career in music at the age of 19, and this was the first time she was on her own. So, this song is about God's faithfulness to sustain us in the moments in our lives, when things seem uncertain.

== Composition ==
"All This Time" is composed in the key of E Major. This song has been described as an intimate and testimonial power ballad that is about Nicole's struggles throughout her life. It has been described as a slow song that showcases vulnerability from Nicole in her voice, but at the same time explodes in the chorus.

== Release ==
"All This Time" was digitally released as the lead single from Gold on January 31, 2012.

== Critical reception ==
AllMusic's Jared Johnson described the song as "one of the more intimate tracks, describing the singer's story of personal belief (and incidentally not sounding too unlike the well-known poem "Footprints") with the chorus 'You've been walking with me all this time.'" Christian Music Zine's Joshua Andre highlighted the song as being "Britt’s salvation testimony 'All This Time'. The first single of the album also, Britt vulnerably shares her story about how she became a Christian in the midst of her parents’ divorce. A song which will impact everyone, Britt picks off where she left with inspirational ballads 'The Lost Get Found' and 'Walk on the Water', showcasing a vibrant and unique singing voice. With different styles and tempos present in this song, what has impacted me most of all is the bridge '...I hear this people asking me, how do I know what I believe, well I'm not the same and that's all the proof I need...'. When we are changed by God, the effect is instant, and we won't even want to go back to life before. Guaranteed ‘All This Time’ will impact lives!" Andre put it as one of the eight favorite tracks. Jesus Freak Hideout's Jen Rose evoked how "is one of her most personal songs, telling the story of how she met Jesus in a warm, accessible way." Louder Than The Music's Jono Davies called the song "a power ballad that could easily have been in an episode of Glee sung by Katy Perry." New Release Tuesday's Kevin Davis alluded to the "sincere autobiographical style where Britt shares her testimony of when she...first met God and celebrates her salvation in Christ. It’s the type of song that I've come to really love from Britt's albums in the style of 'Set The World On Fire.'" Kevin Davis called it a standout track, and so did Jono Davies. Lastly, CCM Magazine highlighted the track as their "We Like" pick.

=== Accolades ===
Critical rankings for "All This Time"
| Publication | Accolade | Rank | Ref |
|---|---|---|---|
| Learn Religions | Top 40 Christian Songs of 2012 | 11 | |

== Music video ==
This song has had an official lyric video made of it, so far.

== Charts ==
Chart performance for "All This Time"
| Chart (2012) | Peak position |
|---|---|
| AUS TRAA (Top 30) | 2 |
| US Hot Christian Songs (Billboard) | 3 |
| US Christian Airplay (Billboard) | 3 |
| US Christian AC (Billboard) | 3 |
