= Ignite and Rebuild =

Studio album by Life In Your Way
- Released: June 7, 2005
- Genre: Hardcore punk Metalcore
- Length: 38:26
- Label: Indianola Records

Life In Your Way chronology
The Sun Rises and the Sun Sets... (2003)	Ignite and Rebuild (2005)	Waking Giants (2007)

Professional ratings
Review scores
Source	Rating
Allmusic	3/5 stars

Ignite and Rebuild is the third full-length album by metalcore band Life in Your Way. It was released in 2005 on Indianola Records.

== Track listing ==
1. "Hope Is War" - 4:04
2. "Light in Mine" - 3:33
3. "Threads of Sincerity" - 5:06
4. "To the Edge" - 3:52
5. "This, The Midnight Fight" - 4:55
6. "More Than Efforts" - 3:21
7. "Stability" - 4:13
8. "Evident" - 4:15
9. "When Rules Change" - 3:18
10. "The Change" - 1:49
