= Waking Giants =

2007 studio album by Life in Your Way

Studio album by Life in Your Way
- Released: March 6, 2007
- Recorded: 2007
- Genres: Melodic hardcore Metalcore
- Length: 41:16
- Label: Solid State Records
- Producers: Ben Kaplan; GGGarth

Life in Your Way chronology
Ignite and Rebuild (2005)	Waking Giants (2007)	Kingdoms (2011)

Professional ratings
Review scores
Source	Rating
Jesusfreakhideout	3/5 stars
Sputnikmusic	4/5 stars
Scene Point Blank	5.5/10 stars

Waking Giants is the third full-length album by the Melodic Hardcore band Life in Your Way. It was released in 2007 on Solid State Records.

== Track listing ==
All songs by Life in Your Way

1. "Reach the End" - 3:49
2. "Worthwhile" - 3:36
3. "We Don't Believe" - 3:17
4. "Making Waves" - 4:34
5. "The Shame" - 2:54
6. "Salty Grave" - 4:20
7. "Help! The Arm of the Mighty" - 3:35
8. "Threads of Sincerity" - 5:49
9. "The Beauty of Grace" - 2:41
10. "Judas" - 2:46
11. "Beneath It All" - 4:00

== Personnel ==
Life in Your Way

- Jeremy Kellam - bass guitar
- Dave Swanson - guitar
- John Gaskill - drums
- Joshua Kellam - lead vocals
- James Allen - guitar, clean vocals

Production and design

- Produced by Ben Kaplan and GGGarth
- Engineering, programming, and keyboards by Ben Kaplan
- Additional engineering: Alex Aligizakus
- Assistant engineer: Quentin Gauthier
- Mixed by Bill Kennedy
- Recorded and mixed at The Farm, Gibsons, British Columbia
- Mastered by Troy Glessner at Spectre Studios
- Art direction: Life in Your Way & Invisible Creature
- Design: Josh Horton for Invisible Creature
- Photography: Jerad Knudson
