= The Sun Rises and the Sun Sets... and Still Our Time Is Endless =

The Sun Rises and the Sun Sets... and Still Our Time is Endless

Studio album by Life In Your Way
- Released: 2003
- Genre: Melodic hardcore Metalcore
- Length: 34:15
- Label: Indianola Records

Life In Your Way chronology
All These Things Tie Me Down (2002)	The Sun Rises and the Sun Sets... and Still Our Time is Endless (2003)	Ignite and Rebuild (2005)

Professional ratings
Review scores
Source	Rating
Sputnikmusic	4.5/5 stars

The Sun Rises and The Sun Sets... and Still Our Time Is Endless is the second studio release from Life In Your Way. Released on Indiola Records in 2003.

== Track listing ==
1. "For The Flames Beneath Your Bridge, My Hearts Collapsed" - 4:58
2. "Not A Word" - 3:56
3. "Rewrite My Concepts" - 3:36
4. "Long Letters" - 3:20
5. "Meant To Be" - 3:21
6. "My Devotion" - 2:48
7. "Fall" - 4:45
8. "Behind Unseen Walls" - 3:56
9. "When It All Comes Down" - 3:30
