= When Given Time to Grow =

Studio album by Conveyer
- Released: September 4, 2015
- Genre: melodic hardcore, metalcore, post-hardcore
- Length: 31:10
- Label: Victory

Conveyer chronology
| Worn Out (2013) | When Given Time to Grow (2015) |

When Given Time to Grow is the first studio album from Conveyer. Victory Records released the album on September 4, 2015.

== Critical reception ==
Professional ratings
Review scores
| Source | Rating |
|---|---|
| Christ Core | 10/10 |
| HM Magazine | 4.5/5 stars |
| Jesus Freak Hideout | . |
| Metal.de | 6/10 |
| Metal Hammer | 6/10 |
| New Noise Magazine | 3/5 stars |
| Power Metal.de | 8.5/10 |
| Tuned Up | 5/5 stars |

Awarding the album four and a half stars from HM Magazine, Nick Sabin states, " There's no doubt this album will give heavy music fans of all types something fresh and new to talk about." Scott Fryberger, indicating in a three and a half star review by Jesus Freak Hideout, replies, "Conveyer's major label debut doesn't produce a lot of talking points, but it does serve as one of the better releases in the genre this year."

Signaling in a six out of ten review for Metal Hammer, Nik Young describes, "As Danny Adams keeps the emotionally drained and caustic yells flowing, the other four bandmembers lace every ounce of despair contained within the misery-laden lyrics with a dose of hope. This makes sense considering this band's faith in that no matter how dark it gets. He can help you overcome...However, the promise seen in this Minneapolis quintet could benefit from more diverse vocals and more of those stripped-down, vulnerable moments."

Natasha Van Duser, giving the album three stars at New Noise Magazine, writes, "So the lyrics maybe heavy, but musically When Given Time To Grow does present some musical gems...When Given Time To Grow is definitely the most appropriate title for this record, as in time, Conveyer show the potential to become a very well rounded and experienced melodic hardcore band." Rating the album five stars for Tuned Up, Ray Moore says, "Conveyer have crafted an album that a lot of people are going to be able to relate to." Phillip Noell, specifying in a ten out of ten review from Christ Core, responds, "This is an album I can’t get enough of."

== Track listing ==
| No. | Title | Length |
|---|---|---|
| 1. | "Shining" | 2:11 |
| 2. | "Haven" | 3:22 |
| 3. | "Nothing" | 2:48 |
| 4. | "Waste" | 2:44 |
| 5. | "Cage" | 1:52 |
| 6. | "Eulogy" | 3:12 |
| 7. | "Ruined" | 2:28 |
| 8. | "Resist Admit" | 3:20 |
| 9. | "Daughter" | 2:15 |
| 10. | "Blister" | 2:52 |
| 11. | "Impatience" (featuring Cam Smith) | 4:05 |
| Total length: | | 31:10 |
