= Wake Up, O Sleeper =

Studio album by Cool Hand Luke
- Released: March 25, 2003
- Recorded: October–December 2002
- Genre: Indie; Alternative rock Pop
- Label: Floodgate Records

Cool Hand Luke chronology
| I Fought Against Myself (2001) | Wake Up, O Sleeper (2003) | The Fires of Life (2004) |

Wake Up, O Sleeper is the second full-length album by indie rock band Cool Hand Luke. It was released in 2003 on Floodgate Records.

== Track listing ==
1. "Heroes Will Be Heroes" - 5:36
2. "One Time" - 4:49
3. "This Is Love" - 5:00
4. "Nobody Hugs a Rose" - 6:10
5. "So Shall It Be" - 4:04
6. "Dreams for Sale" - 7:26
7. "Two Pianos" - 5:28
8. "Like a Bell Tolling from Another World" - 4:59
9. "For You" - 5:59
10. "O Shachah" - 6:52

== Trivia ==
- The title of the album comes from the Bible verse Ephesians 5:14, which is also on the back of the cd booklet, and reads, "Wake up, O sleeper, rise from the dead, and Christ will shine on you."
- The inside of the cd spine reads "You'll cling to what you believe and we'll cling to what we know".
- There is a hidden track located in the pregap of the physical CD. Rewinding the first song when it starts playing will playback the hidden song.
