= Cora (album) =

Studio album by Cool Hand Luke
- Released: June 11, 2017 (for Kickstarter Backers); September 8, 2017 (official release date)
- Studio: Parafonic Recording Studio, Orlando, FL
- Genre: Indie; Alternative rock
- Length: 47:38

Cool Hand Luke chronology
| Of Man (2011) | Cora (2017) |

Professional ratings
Review scores
| Source | Rating |
|---|---|
| Jesus Freak Hideout | 3/5 stars |

Cora is the sixth studio album by indie rock band Cool Hand Luke. The album was funded exclusively by a Kickstarter campaign which raised $9,677 to release the songs.

| No. | Title | Length |
|---|---|---|
| 1. | "Hidden in a Waveform" | 4:09 |
| 2. | "Sing For You" | 3:25 |
| 3. | "Taking Chances" | 4:29 |
| 4. | "Holy Vanguard" | 4:23 |
| 5. | "The Old Man Lies" | 5:13 |
| 6. | "Cora" | 3:05 |
| 7. | "Excavation" | 4:16 |
| 8. | "I Will / I Won't" | 4:40 |
| 9. | "A Space That's Yours" | 4:17 |
| 10. | "Backlit" | 4:11 |
| 11. | "You Are Here" | 5:25 |
| Total length: | | 47:38 |
