= Forever Changed =

American Christian rock band

- Origin: United States
- Genres: Alternative rock, indie pop
- Years active: 1999–2006
- Labels: Floodgate
- Members: Dan Cole; Ben O'Rear; Tom Gustafson; Nathan Lee

Forever Changed was an alternative rock band from Tallahassee and Orlando, Florida. They came together in 1999 and broke up in 2006. Dan Cole was the lead singer, a guitarist, and a pianist. Ben O'Rear was the lead guitarist, Tom Gustafson played bass, and Nathan Lee played the drums. They released three albums: Drifting into Amazing in 2002, The Need to Feel Alive in 2005 and Chapters in 2006.

== Discography ==
=== Albums ===
| Album Cover | Year | Title | Label(s) | Producer |
|---|---|---|---|---|
| | 2002 | Drifting into Amazing | Independent release | |
| | 2005 | The Need to Feel Alive | Floodgate Records | James Paul Wisner |
| | 2006 | Chapters | Floodgate Records EastWest | Jeremy Griffith Forever Changed |

=== Demos and EPs ===
| EP Cover | Year | Title | Label(s) | Producer |
|---|---|---|---|---|
| | 2003 | 2003demo | Independent release | Jeremy Griffith |
| | 2004 | The Existence EP | Independent release | James Paul Wisner |
| | 2004 | The Existence EP | Floodgate Records | James Paul Wisner |
