= The Unveiling (album) =

Studio album by Cry of the Afflicted
- Released: August 14, 2007
- Recorded: Early 2007
- Studio: New World Studio, Chino, California
- Genre: Post-hardcore
- Length: 34:48
- Label: Solid State
- Producer: Jeff Schneeweis

Cry of the Afflicted chronology
Consume This Wasteland (2006)	The Unveiling (2007)

Professional ratings
Review scores
Source	Rating
Punknews.org	3/5 stars

The Unveiling is the second studio album and first album released on independent label Solid State Records by post-hardcore band Cry of the Afflicted.

== Track listing ==
1. "Lift the Veil" – 4:02
2. "Read Between" – 3:22
3. "Built to Fall" – 3:05
4. "The Influence of False Pretense" – 4:16
5. "A Scar Filled Sky" – 3:42
6. "New Hopes, New Dreams" – 3:21
7. "Self Defiance" – 3:51
8. "Heed the Sound" – 3:25
9. "Anchors" – 3:41
10. "Penetrate, Illuminate" – 3:23

== Personnel ==
- James Johnson – guitar
- Troy Doell – drums
- Garrett Packer – vocals
- Nik Wagener – bass guitar, vocals
- Steve Lockhart – guitar
- Jeff Schneeweis – producer, audio engineer
- Tue Madsen – mixing
- Troy Glessner – mastering
- Invisible Creature – art direction
- Ryan Clark – design
- Dave Hill – photography
