= The Sleeping House =

Studio album by Cool Hand Luke
- Released: October 14, 2008
- Recorded: January–February 2007
- Studio: Glow In the Dark Studios, Atlanta, GA
- Genre: Indie; Alternative rock
- Length: 49:49
- Label: Lujo Records

Cool Hand Luke chronology
The Balancing Act (2007)	The Sleeping House (2008)	Live at The Brown Owl (2008)

The Sleeping House is Nashville-based Cool Hand Luke's fourth studio album, released on October 14, 2008. It is considered darker and more aggressive than their other albums. It was recorded January and February 2007 at Glow In the Dark Studios, Atlanta, GA.

== Track listing ==
1. Fast Asleep (1:27)
2. Cast Your Bread (4:00)
3. Failing In Love (3:14)
4. Buy The Truth (4:44)
5. The Mirror (3:57)
6. Eye of The Storm (6:19)
7. The City Prevails (3:52)
8. Spirit Sing (4:26)
9. Wondertour (3:00)
10. The House (5:05)
11. The Incomprehensible Sleep (4:09)
12. Wide Awake (3:26)

== Personnel ==
Joey Holman – guitars
Casey McBride – bass
Mark Nicks – drums, keys, and vocals
Additional percussion by Matt Goldman

== Artwork ==
The artwork in the inside pamphlet of the album tells the story of a man, an underwater explorer, who stumbles upon an underwater cave.
