= Promises for the Imperfect =

Studio album by Number One Gun
- Released: July 19, 2005
- Recorded: Compound Studios, Seattle, Washington
- Genre: Christian rock, alternative rock
- Length: 35:24
- Label: Tooth & Nail
- Producer: Aaron Sprinkle

Number One Gun chronology
Celebrate Mistakes (2003)	Promises for the Imperfect (2005)	The North Pole Project (2008)

Professional ratings
Review scores
Source	Rating
AbsolutePunk.net	(78%)
Allmusic	3.5/5 stars

Promises for the Imperfect is Number One Gun's second studio album. It was released by Tooth & Nail Records. It reached #31 on Billboard's Top Christian Albums chart.

== Track listing ==
1. "Pretend" - 2:49
2. "Regrets of Photographs" - 3:03
3. "We Are" - 3:20
4. "Fireside Wing" - 3:04
5. "There Is Hope" - 3:35
6. "Who You Are" - 3:17
7. "All You Have" - 4:07
8. "Golden Smile" - 3:28
9. "The Time Is Now" - 3:17
10. "Life Is What You Make It" - 5:25
