= Number One Gun =

Christian rock band

- Origin: Chico, California, U.S.
- Genres: Christian rock, indie, alternative, experimental rock
- Years active: 2002–2006, 2007–2014
- Labels: Floodgate, Tooth & Nail
- Members: Jeff Schneeweis
- Past members: Christopher Keene; Jordan Mallory; Trevor Sellers; Ben Tietz
- Website: Number One Gun MySpace

Number One Gun was a Christian rock band from Chico, California, that was most recently signed to Tooth & Nail Records. They self-released their debut EP Forever in 2002, before releasing their follow-up albums Celebrate Mistakes (2003) on Floodgate Records and Promises for the Imperfect (2005) on Tooth & Nail Records.

In 2006, the band members decided to move on to different projects. Jeff Schneeweis created a new band called The North Pole Project, Christopher Keene and Jordan Mallory formed Surrogate, and Trevor Sellers moved on to play bass in the band Armed for Apocalypse.

In early 2007, Schneeweise changed The North Pole Project to Number One Gun, the name still referring to his solo project.

Number One Gun released The North Pole Project on January 15, 2008, through Tooth & Nail Records. The first song from the album, "Million," was released on PureVolume on September 17, 2007. Number One Gun supported this album by touring January 15–30, 2008, with Justin Richards from Brighten on guitar and drummer Jonathan Russo (producer, engineer, multi-instrumentalist, and owner of Sky Bison Productions).

The band's following release, To the Secrets and Knowledge, was a continuation of the one-man project.

In June 2012, Jeff Schneeweis announced on his Twitter that he was developing a new song under the Number One Gun band name. Further posts on Twitter and Facebook revealed that the original lineup would be reuniting to write and record a new full-length album. In July 2012, the band launched a Kickstarter page to help fund their new album and subsequent tour. In addition, the band announced that Stephen Christian, lead singer of the band Anberlin, would collaborate and contribute vocals for at least one song on the album. The album, This Is All We Know, was made available on November 27, 2013, to fans who backed the Kickstarter project, and it was officially released on January 14, 2014, on Tooth & Nail Records.

== Discography ==
Title	Release Date	Label	Chart Positions	
Title	Release Date	Label	US Christ	US Heat
Forever (EP)	2002	Floodgate Records	—	—
Celebrate Mistakes	2003	Floodgate Records	—	—
Promises for the Imperfect	2005	Tooth & Nail Records	31	—
The North Pole Project	2008	Tooth & Nail Records	49	—
To the Secrets and Knowledge	2010	Tooth & Nail Records	24	17
This Is All We Know	2014	Tooth & Nail Records	—	—
