= Say It (Britt Nicole album) =

Studio album by Britt Nicole
- Released: May 22, 2007
- Recorded: 2006–2007
- Studios: Antenna Studios (Franklin, Tennessee); Dutchland Studios (Nashville, Tennessee)
- Genres: Christian rock, Christian pop
- Length: 40:37
- Label: Sparrow
- Producers: Tedd T, Doubledutch, Adam B Smith

Britt Nicole chronology
| Follow the Call (2003) | Say It (2007) | The Lost Get Found (2009) |

Singles from Say It
- 1. "You" Released: 2007; 2. "Believe" Released: 2007; 3. "Set the World On Fire" Released: 2008; 4. "Don't Worry Now" Released: 2008 (Australia)

Say It is the second studio album and major label debut by American recording artist Britt Nicole. It was released May 22, 2007, via Sparrow Records and features the hit songs, "You", "Believe" and "Set the World On Fire".

== Critical reception ==
Professional ratings
Review scores
| Source | Rating |
|---|---|
| About.com | 4.5/5 stars |
| CCM Magazine | 3.5/5 stars |
| Cross Rhythms | 9/10 squares |
| Jesus Freak Hideout | 4/5 stars |
| SoulShine Magazine | 5/5 stars |

About.com's Kim Jones said "bottom line ... Britt Nicole has a winner going with Say It. This girl has it all: talent, drive and a huge heart for ministry. This is one of those faces that you will be seeing a lot more of in the future."

CCM Magazine's Meredith Ball wrote "Musically and vocally, this album is solid. The melodies are infectious, and her voice is appropriately raspy without sacrificing vocal flexibility. Say It is a good listen the entire way through."

Cross Rhythms' Tony Cummings said "this is the debut from 2007 which established this precocious pop talent on the US CCM scene but somehow missed the Cross Rhythms reviewing process. Not that that omission stopped your favourite media organisation from selecting five tracks for its radio stations and all of them – "Holiday", "Good Day", "Don't Worry Now", "Say It" and "World That Breaks" – are as catchy confections as you're likely to hear anywhere." In addition, they said the album "all in all, this is still pure pop put together with considerable skill."

Jesus Freak Hideout's Lauren Summerford wrote "Britt Nicole's debut is a solid one. Say It holds a few potential hit singles and lots of excellent material for an energetic live show. Britt is still young and will have plenty of opportunities to grow as an artist, but for now, listening to her Say It will be enough."

SoulShine Magazine's Lindsay Whitfield said "Britt has not been this way, she has a certain edge and the mixture of production, vocals, lyrics and the instrumentation – everything-it has a chemistry that works. If you haven't picked up this album yet, do so, this is a 5 star gem for anyone who loves fresh pop/trip hop no matter your market, Britt Nicole is definitely ready to go onwards and upwards in her career."

== Track listing ==
| No. | Title | Writer(s) | Length |
|---|---|---|---|
| 1. | "Holiday" | Britt Nicole, Adam B Smith, Tedd Tjornhorn | 3:51 |
| 2. | "Believe" | Rob Hawkins, Nicole, Smith, Tjornhorn | 3:31 |
| 3. | "Set the World on Fire" | Jason Ingram, Cindy Morgan, Nicole | 3:36 |
| 4. | "Sunshine Girl" | Nicole, Joe Pangallo, Smith, Tjornhorn | 4:04 |
| 5. | "Ready" | Josiah Bell, Robert "Aurel M" Marvin, Nicole, Aaron Rice | 3:38 |
| 6. | "You" | Morgan, Nicole, Tjornhorn | 3:39 |
| 7. | "When She Cries" | Greg Bleck, Tyler Hayes Bleck, Nicole, Smith | 3:13 |
| 8. | "Good Day" | Ingram, Nicole, Tjornhorn | 3:23 |
| 9. | "Don't Worry Now" | Jeremy Bose, Nicole, Tjornhorn | 4:06 |
| 10. | "Say It" | Ingram, Morgan, Nicole, Tjornhorn | 4:07 |
| 11. | "World That Breaks" | Bell, Marvin, Nicole, Rice | 3:22 |
| Total length: | | | 40:37 |

Japan bonus tracks
| No. | Title | Writer(s) | Length |
|---|---|---|---|
| 12. | "Come What May" | Ingram, Morgan, Nicole, Tjornhorn | 3:33 |
| 13. | "Believe (Acoustic Mix)" | Hawkins, Nicole, Smith, Tjornhorn | 4:10 |
| 14. | "Last Christmas" | George Michael | 4:05 |
| Total length: | | | 51:48 |

== Personnel ==
- Britt Nicole – all vocals
- Tedd T – programming (1–4, 6–10), bass (3, 8, 10), drums (10)
- Josiah Sherman – keyboards (3, 4, 6, 8–10)
- Damon Riley – programming (4)
- Josiah Bell – all instruments (5, 11)
- Robert Marvin – all instruments (5, 11)
- Brian Gocher – programming (7)
- Adam Smith – programming (7)
- Eric Lemeire – guitars (2–4, 6, 8)
- Gabriel Wilson – guitars (2, 4, 6, 10), keyboards (10)
- Joe Pangallo – guitars (4, 7)
- Matt Fennell – guitars (7)
- David May – guitars (11)
- Lynn Nichols – guitars (11)
- Tony Lucido – bass (7, 11)
- Ben Phillps – drums (1, 8)
- Tony Morra – drums (2)
- Dan Needham – drums (7)
- Will Sayles – drums (11)
- David Davidson – viola (7), violin (7)

== Production ==
- Tedd T – producer (1–4, 6–10), recording (1–4, 6–10), mixing (9)
- Adam Scott – additional producer (4), producer (7)
- Doubledutch – producers (5, 11), recording (5, 11)
- Ainslie Grosser – recording (1–4, 6–10), mixing (1–4, 6, 8, 10)
- John DeNosky – recording (1–4, 6–10)
- Darrell Lehman – recording (1–4, 6–10)
- Rusty Varenkamp – recording (7)
- Daniel Allen – recording assistant (11)
- Dave Piechura – recording assistant (11)
- Andy Selby – additional editing (5, 11)
- Nathan Watkins – additional editing (11)
- F. Reid Shippen – mixing (5, 11)
- Buckley Miller – mix assistant (5, 11)
- Brian Gardner – mastering at Bernie Grundman Mastering (Hollywood, California)
- Brad O'Donnell – A&R
- Jan Cook – creative director
- Tim Frank – art direction
- Alexis Goodman – design
- Kristin Barlowe – photography

== Singles ==
- 2007: "You"
- 2007: "Sunshine Girl"
- 2007: "Believe"
- 2008: "Set the World On Fire"
- 2009: "Don't Worry Now" (2008, Australia)

== Charts ==
| Chart (2009) | Peak position |
|---|---|
| Billboard Christian Albums | 40 |
| Billboard Top Heatseekers | 45 |
| Japanese Christian & Gospel Albums Top 100 (Oricon) | 7 |

== Notes ==
- The song "Indestructible" was featured on the album, WOW Next 2007, but was taken off the final track listing for the album.
- The song "Come What May" was taken off the final track listing of the album, but was available for a short time on her digital EP Holiday Trio. The EP is available on Rhapsody.
- The acoustic mix of "Believe" is available on the album Acoustic Playlist: Bold.
- The song "Set the World On Fire" was featured on the albums WOW Hits 2008 and WOW Hits 2009. It was also included on the soundtrack to the 2011 film Soul Surfer and is the closing song on the end credits of the film.
- "Sunshine Girl" was included in the soundtrack to Thrillville: Off the Rails,
