= Through Your Eyes =

Single by Britt Nicole

from the album Britt Nicole
- Released: July 29, 2016
- Recorded: 2016
- Studio: The GloveBox, Nashville, TN
- Genre: CCM; CEDM
- Length: 3:18
- Label: Capitol
- Songwriters: Britt Nicole; Ben Glover
- Producer: David Garcia

Britt Nicole singles chronology
"The Sun Is Rising" (2015)	"Through Your Eyes" (2016)	"Be the Change" (2016)

"Through Your Eyes" is the lead single, released on July 29, 2016, from Britt Nicole's eponymous fifth album. It appears on WOW Hits 2018.

== Background ==
The song was conceived by Nicole after wanting to constantly better herself. She explained: "The song is about seeing ourselves through the eyes of God and finally finding life and purpose."

== Composition ==
"Through Your Eyes" is originally in the key of B Major, with a tempo of 96 beats per minute. Written in common time, Nicole's vocal range spans from F#_{3} to D#_{5} during the song.

== Critical reception ==
Professional ratings
Review scores
Source	Rating
365 Days of Inspiring Media	4.5/5 stars

"Through Your Eyes" received positive response from critics. 365 Days of Inspiring Media's Jonathan Andre remarked, "Dare I say that this song has shot up to become one of my top 10 favorite songs of 2016 thus far? Because it has. A more-than-likely shoe-in on WOW Hits 2017" New Release Today praised the song’s production noting, "Through Your Eyes, follows the trend of tropical house/pop music that has been on the rise lately, giving it a new Christian twist with lyrics that thank God for not looking at us as we do but instead allowing us to see us in the way only He does. A true gem and possibly her best work to date."

== Music video ==
A lyric video for the song premiered on Aug 15, 2016 on YouTube.

== Credits and personnel ==
Credits adapted from Tidal.

- David Garcia – producer
- Ben Glover – composer & lyricist
- Britt Nicole – composer & lyricist

== Live performances ==
Nicole performed the song live on Air1.

== Charts ==
=== Weekly charts ===
Weekly chart performance for "Through Your Eyes"
Chart (2016)	Peak position
US Hot Christian Songs (Billboard)	20
US Christian Airplay (Billboard)	16
US Christian AC (Billboard)	18

=== Year-end charts ===
2017 year-end chart performance for "Through Your Eyes"
Chart (2017)	Peak position
US Christian Songs (Billboard)	84
US Christian Hot AC/CHR (Billboard)	42
