= Gold (Britt Nicole album) =

Studio album by Britt Nicole
- Released: March 26, 2012
- Recorded: 2011, 2012
- Studios: Glomo Studio, My Kid Brothers House and Robot Lemon (Nashville, Tennessee): Fabmusic (Franklin, Tennessee)
- Genres: Christian pop; EDM; pop rock; hip hop
- Length: 40:19
- Label: Sparrow/Capitol
- Producers: Josh Crosby: David Garcia; Dan Muckala; Christopher Stevens

Britt Nicole chronology
Acoustic (EP) (2010)	Gold (2012)	The Remixes (2015)

Mainstream re-release

Singles from Gold
- 1. "All This Time" Released: January 31, 2012; 2. "Stand" Released: September 4, 2012; 3. "Gold" Released: November 13, 2012; 4. "Ready or Not" Released: July 16, 2013

Gold is the fourth studio album by Britt Nicole. It was released on March 26, 2012, and features the Christian radio singles "All This Time", "Stand", and "Ready or Not", as well as her debut mainstream single "Gold". The album was re-released to mainstream markets on February 26, 2013, via Capitol Records, along with a new album cover. In 2014, the song "The Sun Is Rising" was included as part of the soundtrack of the movie The Other Woman, gaining popularity without being an official single.

The album has sold 124,000 copies in the US as of September 2016.

== Critical reception ==
Professional ratings
Review scores
Source	Rating
Allmusic	4/5 stars
CCM Magazine	3.5/5 stars
Christian Music Zine	4.75 stars on a 5 point scale
Christianity Today	3/5 stars
Cross Rhythms	9/10 squares 8/10 squares
Indie Vision Music	4/5 stars
Jesus Freak Hideout	3.5/5 stars
Louder Than The Music	4/5 stars
New Release Tuesday	5/5 stars

Jared Johnson from Allmusic stated "the third album from contemporary Christian standout Britt Nicole is a laser beam of positivity." Grace S. Aspinwall from CCM Magazine said "the album flows well and includes dance anthems alongside some beautiful ballads." Christian Music Zine's Joshua Andre said "this album has left me literally with no words. Nicole's album is hands down more mature, lyrically and musically sound than her two previous albums combined." Christianity Today stated in an article that "it's a rare thing to find a CCM artist who appeals to top-40 fans, balancing Christian themes with a sound comparable to today's radio hits. Britt Nicole finds the sweet spot with Gold, showcasing catchy dance beats with the star quality of a Disney Channel diva." Andy Cooper from Cross Rhythms said, "This is faith-filled pop bringing a bright hope and an infectious youthful smile to everyone." Indie Vision Music's Jonathan Andre said "this is a terrific album, no dull points. Every song is a reminder that we are precious to God, that He will do anything for us to be with Him. These 13 songs have reminded me that He is always there in the midst of life, shaping and molding us into the people that He wants us to be." Andre wrote "this album incorporates dance, pop, ballads, rap, and every other genre. This album is for everyone, to be reminded that we don’t walk this world alone. Jesus is with us every step of the way and what a sobering thought this is! Isn’t that worth more than all the gold we can have? We are kings and queens of the most High God; let us claim who we are in Christ."

=== Accolades ===
At the 55th Annual Grammy Awards in 2013, Gold was nominated for Best Contemporary Christian Music Album, which went to TobyMac’s Eye On It.

Year-end lists
Publication	Accolade	Rank	Ref.
Cross Rhythms	The 20 Best Albums of 2012	1	
New Release Today	Top 10 Albums of 2012	3	

== Track listing ==
Gold
No.	Title	Writer(s)	Length
1.	"Gold"	Jess Cates, Dan Muckala, Britt Nicole	2:58
2.	"All This Time"	David Garcia, Ben Glover, Nicole	3:23
3.	"Look Like Love"	Garcia, Glover, Nicole	3:31
4.	"Who You Say You Are"	Glover, Muckala, Nicole	4:11
5.	"Ready or Not" (featuring Lecrae)	Tofer Brown, Josh Crosby, Lecrae Moore, Nicole, Kyle Shearer	3:00
6.	"Breakthrough"	Garcia, Nicole, Christopher Stevens	3:12
7.	"Stand"	Jason Ingram, Muckala, Nicole	3:38
8.	"The Sun Is Rising"	Ingram, Muckala, Nicole	4:26
9.	"Amazing Life"	Ingram, Muckala, Nicole	3:33
10.	"Still That Girl"	Garcia, Glover, Nicole, Stevens	4:26
11.	"Seeing for the First Time"	Ingram, Nicole	4:01
Total length:			40:19

iTunes bonus tracks
No.	Title	Writer(s)	Length
12.	"Amazing Life (Capital Kings Remix)"	Ingram, Muckala, Nicole	3:08
13.	"Straight for Your Heart"	Aaron Gillespie, Muckala, Nicole	4:40

iTunes Mainstream re-release bonus tracks
No.	Title	Writer(s)	Length
12.	"Gold" (Jason Nevins Rhythmic Radio [Remix])	Cates, Muckala, Nicole	3:13
13.	"Gold" (Wideboys Remix)	Cates, Muckala, Nicole	3:20

Digital bonus tracks

- Story Behind "All This Time" [Digital Bonus Track]
- Story Behind "Gold" [Digital Bonus Track]

== Personnel ==
- Britt Nicole – all vocals
- Dan Muckala – programming (1, 4, 7–9, 13), arrangements (1, 4, 7–9, 13)
- Christopher Stevens – keyboards (2, 6, 10), programming (6, 10), keytar (6), guitars (10), additional keyboards (11), additional programming (11)
- David Garcia – keyboards (2, 3, 6, 10), programming (2, 3, 6, 10), guitars (2, 3, 6, 11), bass (2, 3), keytar (6)
- Josh Crosby – programming (5), additional vocals (5)
- Kyle Shearer – programming (5)
- Cole Walowac – keyboards (6)
- Matt Stanfield – keyboards (11), programming (11)
- Jason Ingram – additional keyboards (11), additional programming (11)
- Chuck Butler – acoustic guitar (1, 4, 7–9, 13), electric guitar (1, 4, 7–9, 13)
- Adam Lester – acoustic guitar (1, 4, 7–9, 13), electric guitar (1, 4, 7–9, 13)
- Chris Lacorte – guitars (3)
- Tofer Brown – guitars (5), additional vocals (5)
- Ben Glover – guitars (10)
- Lecrae – rap (5)
- Jenna Davis – additional vocals (5)

=== Production ===
- Brad O'Donnell – A&R
- Dan Muckala – producer (1, 4, 7–9, 12, 13), engineer (1, 4, 7–9), mixing (4, 7–9)
- David Garcia – producer (2, 3, 6, 10, 11), engineer (2, 3, 6, 10, 11)
- Christopher Stevens – producer (2, 3, 6, 10, 11), engineer (2, 3, 6, 10, 11), mixing (2, 3, 6, 10, 11)
- Josh Crosby – producer (5), vocal producer (5)
- Jenna Davis – additional vocal producer (5)
- Serban Ghenea – mixing (1)
- F. Reid Shippen – mixing (5)
- David Muckala – assistant engineer (1, 4, 7–9)
- Taylor Stevens – assistant engineer (2, 3, 6, 10, 11)
- Chuck Butler – additional editing (1, 4, 7–9)
- Tom Coyne – mastering at Sterling Sound (New York, NY)
- Jan Cook – art direction
- Sean Mosher-Smith – package design
- Kristin Barlowe – photography
- Gavin Taylor – art direction, design (re-release)
- Ari Michelson – photography (re-release)

== Charts ==
=== Weekly charts ===
Weekly chart performance for Gold
Chart (2012)	Peak position
US Billboard 200	41
US Top Christian Albums (Billboard)	1

Chart (2013)	Peak position
US Top Catalog Albums (Billboard)	45

=== Year-end charts ===
2012 year-end chart performance for Gold
Chart (2012)	Peak position
US Christian Albums (Billboard)	34

2013 year-end chart performance for Gold
Chart (2013)	Peak position
US Christian Albums (Billboard)	17

=== Singles ===
Singles and other charted songs
Year	Single	Peak chart positions			
Year	Single	US	US Christ.	US Pop	UK Cross
2012	"All This Time"	—	3	—	—
2012	"Stand"	—	36	—	—
2012	"Breakthrough"	—	—	—	3
2013	"Gold"	83	16	28	—
2013	"Ready or Not"	—	25	—	—
"—" denotes releases that did not chart
