= Britt Nicole (album) =

Studio album by Britt Nicole
- Released: October 7, 2016
- Recorded: 2015, 2016
- Studios: The Glove Box Studio, Blackbird Studio, Eastwest Studios, Woodshed Studios (Nashville, Tennessee); Side 3 Studios, Cryptic Studios, Rocking Chair Studio, Wake Up N Work (Park Ridge, Illinois)
- Genres: Pop; inspirational
- Length: 43:00 (standard edition); 55:22 (deluxe edition)
- Label: Capitol CMG
- Producers: David Garcia, Jason Ingram, Joshua Crosby

Britt Nicole chronology
The Remixes (2015)	Britt Nicole (2016)	II II V (2025)

Singles from Britt Nicole
- 1. "Through Your Eyes" Released: July 29, 2016; 2. "Be the Change" Released: September 16, 2016

Britt Nicole is the self-titled fifth studio album by the American Christian pop musician Britt Nicole. It was released on October 7, 2016, via Capitol Christian Music Group. It was produced by David Garcia, Jason Ingram, and Joshua Crosby; although containing contemporary Christian influences, the record finds Nicole leaning further into a secular pop sound in an attempt to expand her audience into the mainstream music industry. Upon release, the album was met with widespread acclaim from critics, many of whom praised its production style and modern pop sound.

Britt Nicole was supported with the release of two preceding singles, "Through Your Eyes" on July 29, 2016, and "Be the Change" on September 16, 2016, and one promotional single, "Pave" on September 22, 2016. In the United States, "Through Your Eyes" peaked at number 20 on the Billboard Hot Christian Songs chart, and in the United Kingdom reached number 7 on the Cross Rhythms Christian Airplay chart; "Be the Change" was positioned at number 22 on the former and number 4 on the latter. The album itself debuted at its peak position of number 100 on the Billboard 200.

== Reception ==
Professional ratings
Review scores
Source	Rating
365 Days of Inspiring Media	4.5/5 stars
CCM Magazine	4/5 stars
Cross Rhythms	8/10 squares
Jesus Freak Hideout	4.5/5 stars 4/5 stars
Louder Than the Music	4/5 stars
Today's Christian Entertainment	3.5/5

=== Critical ===
Upon release Britt Nicole received a positive response from music critics. In a four-star review for CCM Magazine, Andy Argyrakis highlighted the production, "Rather than trying to catch up to trends or rethreading her previous steps, the singer-songwriter instead bulldozes an entirely fresh path of club-ready beats and soulfully works her way around just as many towering ballads." Jesus Freak Hideout's Nicole Marie Vacca called Britt Nicole "a catchy, uplifting album and is especially recommended for listeners who want to get up and dance." In a second opinion for the magazine, Mark Rice also responded positively commenting that "Britt nicely fills a void that has been significantly lacking in the Christian market; pure, unadulterated, unfiltered, fully processed pop (think Taylor Swift or Justin Bieber). It is the type of music that no one really wants to admit they like but is so irresistibly pleasant that they can't help themselves."

365 Days of Inspiring Media's Jonathan Andre stated that Britt Nicole is "one of the most unique albums of the year, with a plethora of musical genres all within 14 tracks." Louder Than the Music's Jono Davies praised the vocal performance, "Britt Nicole's vocals are of course amazing. She stands alongside many modern female vocalists like Ellie Goulding and Katy Perry. This album is well worth getting if you're into modern pop music." Lins Honeyman from Cross Rhythms also highlighted the album as "first class pop sensibility that has become her trademark and strength." Today's Christian Entertainment's Kelly Meade awarded the album three-and-a-half stars out of five noting the album, "is a modern, radio friendly collection of music that cannot be defined by any one category making for an interesting listen."

=== Accolades ===
Year-end lists
Publication	Accolade	Rank	Ref.
365 Days of Inspiring Media	Top 30 Albums of 2016	19	

== Track listing ==
No.	Title	Writer(s)	Length
1.	"Through Your Eyes"	Ben Glover, Britt Nicole	3:17
2.	"All The Money"	Nicole, Brett McLaughlin, Joshua Crosby	3:26
3.	"Better"	Nicole, David Garcia, Julia Michaels	3:18
4.	"Work Of Ark"	Crosby, Nicole, Elley Duhe, Joseph Hill, Zachary Williams	4:09
5.	"Fallin In Love"	Crosby, Duhe, Nicole, Robert Nix	4:11
6.	"Be The Change"	Crosby, Nicole, Jaden Michaels	3:57
7.	"All Day"	Crosby, Duhe, Hill, Nicole, Williams, Andrew Fridge, Taji Ausar	5:41
8.	"Pave"	Alys Ffion, Patrick Martin	3:31
9.	"No Filter"	Brittany Burton, Emily Warren, Josh Alexander	4:00
10.	"Girls Night Out"	Crosby, McLaughlin, Nicole, Robert Nix	3:16
11.	"After You"	Crosby, Nicole, Jason Ingram	4:21
Total length:			43:00

Deluxe bonus tracks
No.	Title	Writer(s)	Length
12.	"Concrete"	Michaels, Chris Sernel, Mitch Allan	3:31
13.	"Heart Of Stone"	Crosby, Michaels, Nicole, Eric Ramey, Nate Cyphert	4:21
14.	"Electric Love"	Crosby, Nicole, Rodney Jerkins	4:22
Total length:			55:22

== Personnel ==
- Britt Nicole – all vocals
- Joshua Crosby – drums (2), keyboards (3) vocal producer (7)
- Paul Mabury – drums (11)
- Jonathan Crone – guitars (2, 4, 5, 10)
- David Garcia – guitars (3), keyboards (3) vocal producer (12)
- Kyle Lundy – guitars (6)
- Tim Dillon – guitars (6)
- Josh Alexander – guitars (9) piano (9) keyboards (9)
- Fredrik Strand Halland – guitars (14)
- Eric Ramey – bass guitar (3, 4), additional programming (4), bass (5)
- Robert Nix – programming (5)
- Anthony Raglin – additional programming (5, 6), strings (3)
- Adam Friedman – additional programming (8)
- Taylor Grubbs – saxophone (6)
- Daniel Webber – keyboards (9) programming (9)
- Gary Lunn – bass (10)
- Doug Moffet – horns (10)
- Mark Douthit – horns (10)
- Mike Haynes – horns (10)
- Steve Patrick – horns (10)
- Matt Butler – strings (11)
- Mitch Allan – bass, guitar, keyboards, programming (12)
- Oh, Hush! – bass, guitar, keyboards, programming (12)

=== Production ===
- David Garcia – producer (1, 3)
- Joshua Crosby – producer (3, 4, 5, 6, 8, 10, 13), mixing (8, 13)
- Daniel Webber – producer (9)
- Jason Ingram – producer (11)
- Mitch Allan – producer (12)
- Oh, Hush! – producer (12)
- Eric Ramey – producer (13)
- Rodney Jerkins – producer (14)
- Z. Will – co-producer (7)
- Josh Gudwin – mixing (1, 4)
- Robert Orton – mixing (2, 12)
- F. Reid Shippen – mixing (3, 5)
- Serban Ghenea – mixing (6)
- Phil Tan – mixing (7, 9, 14)
- Taylor Grubbs – mixing (10)
- Sean Moffitt – mixing (11)
- Kory Welty – mix assistant (1)
- Daniel Dacigalupi – mix assistant (3, 5)
- Alena Morgan – mix assistant (3, 5)
- Nick Lobel – mix assistant (11)
- Warren David – mix assistant (11)
- Nicole Frantz – creative director
- Katie Moore – design
- Nikko La Mere – photography

== Charts ==
Chart performance for Britt Nicole
Chart (2016)	Peak position
US Billboard 200	100
