= Gold (Britt Nicole song) =

2012 song by Britt Nicole

Single by Britt Nicole

from the album Gold
- Released: November 13, 2012
- Genre: Pop; electropop; reggae fusion
- Length: 3:00
- Label: Capitol, Sparrow
- Songwriters: Britt Nicole, Dan Muckala, Jess Cates, BK Irish
- Producer: Dan Muckala

Britt Nicole singles chronology
"Stand" (2012)	"Gold" (2012)	"Ready or Not" (2013)

Gold EP

"Gold" is a song by musician Britt Nicole from her fourth album, Gold. It was released on November 13, 2012, as her debut mainstream single on Capitol Records.

== Background and composition ==
This song was produced by Dan Muckala, and was written by Muckala, Jess Cates, B.K. Irish and Britt Nicole. This song was composed in A-flat major with a tempo of 96 beats per minute and a time signature of 4/4.

== Commercial performance ==
As of July 19, 2013, the song has sold 169,000 copies in the US. However, on March 5, 2014 the song was certified Gold by the RIAA for sales over 500,000. This was Nicole's first song to chart the Billboard Hot 100, peaking at No. 83.

== Music video ==
The official video for the song premiered on November 29, 2012, and has received rotation on Disney Channel, TeenNick, and MTV. The video shows several high school teens who are not 'normal', in this sense being a Goth girl who self harms, a guy who dances ballet, a bulimic, a girl who likes to skateboard, and a young boy who is deemed too short to play basketball. They are all drawn to a gold light and drop into a world with several different teens, where they go to a mansion and find their people.

The music video is intercut with clips of Nicole singing and holding balloons in a hedge maze.

== Track listing ==
- Digital Single
1. Gold
- Digital EP
1. Gold
2. Gold (Jason Nevins Rhythmic Radio Remix)
3. Gold (Wideboys Remix)

== Charts ==
=== Weekly charts ===
Weekly chart performance for "Gold"
Chart (2012–13)	Peak position
US Billboard Hot 100	83
US Hot Christian Songs (Billboard)	16
US Dance Club Songs (Billboard)	33
US Heatseekers Songs (Billboard)	8
US Pop Airplay (Billboard)	28

=== Year-end charts ===
2013 year-end chart performance for "Gold"
Chart (2013)	Position
US Christian Songs (Billboard)	33
US Christian Hot AC/CHR (Billboard)	3

2014 year-end chart performance for "Gold"
Chart (2014)	Position
US Christian Digital Song Sales (Billboard)	41
US Christian Streaming Songs (Billboard)	22

== Release history ==
Release dates and formats for "Gold"
Region	Date	Format	Label(s)	Ref.
United States	December 4, 2012	Mainstream airplay	Capitol	
