= The Lost Get Found =

Studio album by Britt Nicole
- Released: August 11, 2009
- Recorded: 2009
- Studios: Dutchland Studios (Nashville, Tennessee); Glorified Mono Studio (Franklin, Tennessee)
- Genres: Christian rock, Christian pop, Christian hip hop
- Length: 38:25
- Label: Sparrow
- Producers: Robert "Aurel M" Marvin; Dan Muckala; Adam B Smith; Joshua Crosby

Britt Nicole chronology
Say It (2007)	The Lost Get Found (2009)	Acoustic (EP) (2010)

Singles from The Lost Get Found
- 1. "The Lost Get Found" Released: June 16, 2009; 2. "Walk on the Water" Released: November 2009; 3. "Hanging On" Released: July 13, 2010; 4. "Headphones" Released: April 4, 2011 (United Kingdom)

The Lost Get Found is the third studio album by American recording artist Britt Nicole. It was released on August 11, 2009, and features the Christian radio No. 1 songs, "The Lost Get Found" and "Walk on the Water". It debuted at No. 1 on Billboard's Hot Christian Albums Chart, and No. 62 on the Billboard 200, a career high for the singer.

== Critical reception ==
Professional ratings
Review scores
Source	Rating
AllMusic (Jared Johnson)	4/5 stars
CCM Magazine (Andrew Greer)	4/5 stars
Christian Music Review (Kevin Davis)	4.5/5 stars
Cross Rhythms (Simon Eden)	9/10 squares
Jesus Freak Hideout (Nathaniel Schexnayder)	3.5/5 stars
Louder Than the Music (Suzanne Physick)	4.5/5 stars

Allmusic's Jared Johnson said "in the post-Katy Perry world, it would be tough to find a more relevant, fresh, and thoughtful album than Britt Nicole's Lost Get Found. Following a well-received debut, the Christian singer's sophomore record finds her at her peak: infectious, vivid, and great on the dancefloor. Nicole channels the energy of many of her contemporaries, from Sara Bareilles to Avril Lavigne, Ashley Tisdale to Gwen Stefani." Johnson wrote "thankfully, the album does not sacrifice substance for style; Nicole once again shows her strength of delivering meaningful lyrics relating to specific events and situations. Producers Robert Marvin (Mat Kearney, tobyMac) and Dan Muckala (Brandon Heath, Backstreet Boys) collaborated to give the album its high-energy output."

CCM Magazine's Andrew Greer said "oscillating between vulnerable tracks that vocalize the struggle to surrender to God and sunny tunes of sheer fun, The Lost Get Found is an attractive set list. And though the lyrics may be a bit vague at times, this is pop music, and excellent pop music at that."

Christian Music Review's Kevin Davis said "'The Lost Get Found' is a great and catchy album by Britt Nicole. The title track, 'Safe', 'Hanging On', 'Headphones', 'Walk on The Water' and 'Have Your Way' are my favorite songs on the album. Along with 'Life Light Up' by Christy Nockels this is my top album by a female artist and one of my top overall albums of the year. If you liked 'Relentless' by Natalie Grant and 'My Paper Heart' by Francesca Battistelli, then you’ll love 'The Lost Get Found' by Britt Nicole."

Cross Rhythms' Simon Eden said "this is pop nearing perfection. Remarkably, every track on this, Britt's second album, has the potential to become a US/UK mainstream number one hit with sufficient airplay. That success is beginning to show with the album and the title track single both hitting number one on the US Christian charts. With slightly breathy, sultry, intimate verses balanced with powerful choruses, each song radiates such positivity that you wonder how they managed to get the rainbows and sunshine packaged in." Eden wrote "Musically targeted at excitable teenage girls, the Christian aspect is brilliantly natural and portrays God as a normal integrated part of any teenager's life without dumbing down or hyped worship and is a major credit to Britt's songwriting. As a pop album it fits into a mainstream genre and consequently sounds similar to singers like Avril Lavigne, which is no bad thing."

Jesus Freak Hideout's Nathaniel Schexnayder wrote that "despite some cliché lyrics and the absence of more straight-up terrific highlights, The Lost Get Found is a fun album which definitely is a solid follow up to Say It. But even though the pop dance tunes are catchy, Meyers and many other pop-flair dependent artists routinely produce similar ear candy. The blend of youth and a refined pop beat combined on the title track is likely the direction where Britt Nicole should go in order to stand-out more. After all, that's how the good get better."

Louder Than the Music's Suzanne Physick said "Every once in a while you find a track that perfectly sums up something you have been trying to say for ages but have never managed to find the words. For me, Have Your Way is that track. It is the perfect pot of gold at the end of the rainbow. Simply with that and the wonderfully written Headphones the album would be worth buying but the truth [is] that there are 9 other fantastic tracks that come along with them and you really shouldn't miss out on any one of them."

== Track listing ==
No.	Title	Writer(s)	Length
1.	"The Lost Get Found"	Ben Glover, Britt Nicole	3:25
2.	"How We Roll"	Nicole, Adam B Smith	3:12
3.	"Safe"	Jason Ingram, Nicole, Joy Williams	3:22
4.	"Hanging On"	Andrew Fromm, Ingram, Nicole	3:24
5.	"Headphones"	Joshua Crosby, Nicole	3:40
6.	"Welcome to the Show"	Crosby, Nicole	3:22
7.	"Walk on the Water"	Crosby, Dan Muckala, Nicole	3:50
8.	"Glow"	Nick Baumhardt, Crosby, Nicole	3:00
9.	"Like a Star"	Nicole, Smith	3:53
10.	"Feel the Light"	Tim Holt, Nicole, Smith	3:38
11.	"Have Your Way"	Josiah Bell, Nicole	3:39
Total length:			38:25

Japan bonus tracks
No.	Title	Writer(s)	Length
12.	"The Lost Get Found (Remix)"	Glover, Nicole	3:44
Total length:			42:09

== Personnel ==
- Britt Nicole – all vocals, programming (6), additional keyboards (8), acoustic piano (11)
- Dan Muckala – programming (1, 4, 7, 9, 10), keyboards (1, 4, 7, 9, 10), bass programming (1, 4, 7, 9, 10), drums (1, 4, 7, 9, 10)
- Robert Marvin – programming (2, 3, 6, 8), all other instruments (2, 3, 8), additional programming (11)
- Adam Scott – programming (2), acoustic guitar (2)
- Andy Selby – additional programming (3, 11), strings (3)
- Chuck Butler – guitars (1, 4, 7, 9, 10)
- Adam Lester – guitars (1, 4, 7, 9, 10)
- Albert Kiteck – guitars (5)
- Loren Prothero – guitars (6)
- Cary Barlowe – guitars (8)
- Mike Payne – guitars (8)
- Tony Lucido – bass (3)
- Joshua Crosby – drums (2, 3, 8), programming (5, 6), additional programming (8)

== Production ==
- Dan Muckala – producer (1, 4, 7, 9, 10), engineer (1, 4, 7, 9, 10), mixing (1, 4, 7, 9, 10)
- Robert Marvin – producer (2, 3, 5, 6, 8, 11), recording (3, 6, 8, 11), mixing (6, 11)
- Adam Scott – co-producer (2)
- Joshua Crosby – recording assistant (3, 6, 8, 11), co-producer (5)
- Chuck Butler – additional vocal editing (1, 4, 7, 9, 10)
- F. Reid Shippen – mixing (2, 3, 5, 8)
- Buckley Miller – mix assistant (3, 6, 8, 11)
- Vinnie Alibrandi – digital editing
- Chris Gehringer – mastering
- Brad O'Donnell – A&R
- Jan Cook – creative director
- Katie Moore – art direction
- Lee Floyd – design
- Reid Rolls – photography
- Recorded at Glorified Mono Studios (Franklin, Tennessee) and Dutchland Studios (Nashville, Tennessee).
- Mastered at Sterling Sound (New York City, New York).

== Charts ==
=== Album ===
Chart (2009)	Peak position
US Billboard 200	62
US Top Christian Albums (Billboard)	1

=== Singles ===
Year	Single	Chart	Peak position
2009	"The Lost Get Found"	Billboard Hot Christian Songs	8
2009	"Walk on the Water"	Billboard Hot Christian Songs	17
2010	"Hanging On"	Billboard Hot Christian Songs	19
2011	"Headphones"	Cross Rhythms Weekly UK Charts	2

Other charted songs

Year	Single	Chart	Peak position
2010	"Welcome to the Show"	Cross Rhythms Weekly UK Charts	4
2010	"Safe"	Cross Rhythms Weekly UK Charts	3
2010	"Have Your Way"	Cross Rhythms Weekly UK Charts	4
