= Life in Your Way =

American metal band

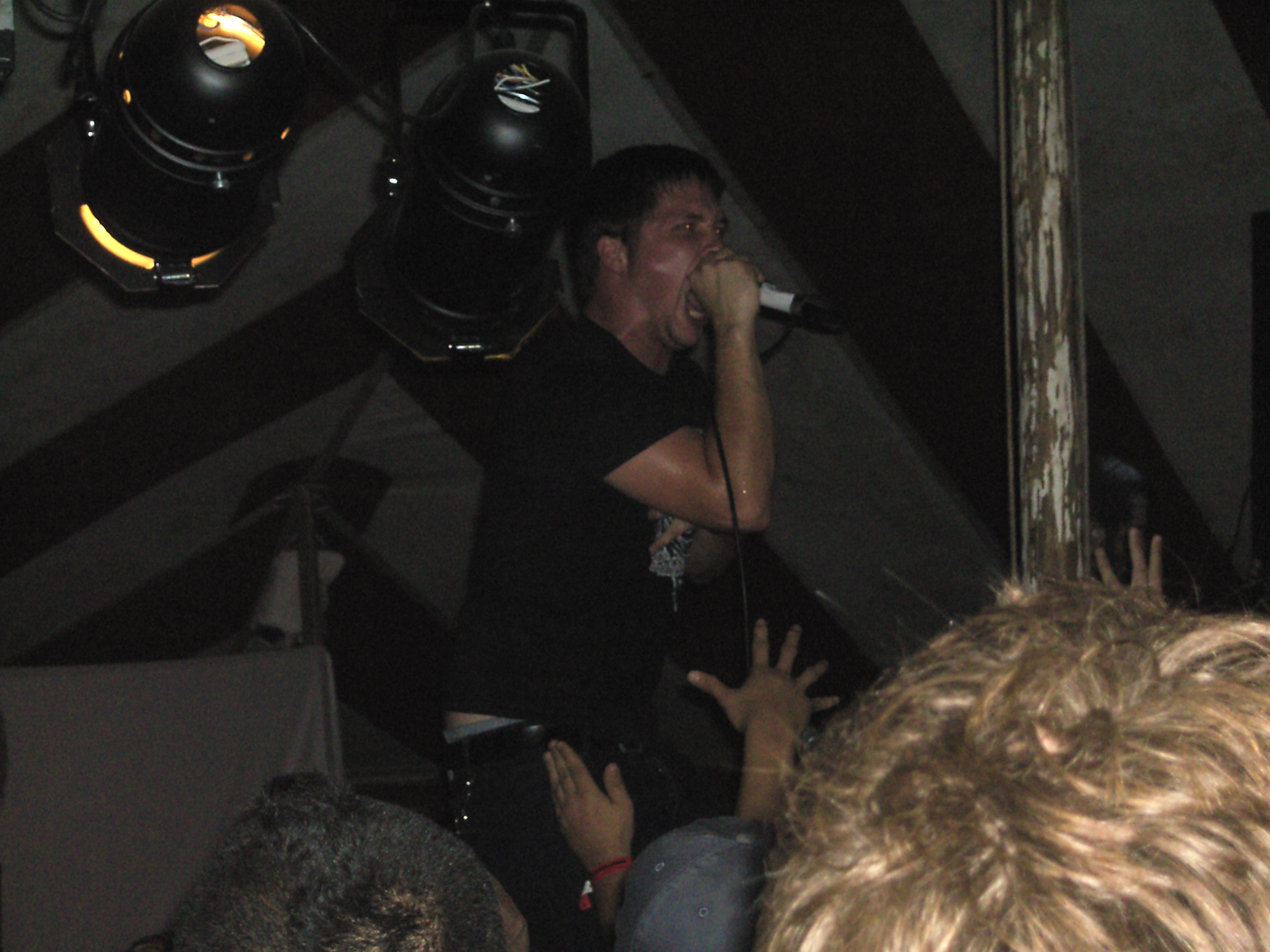
- Josh Kellam, lead vocalist of Life in Your Way, performs at Cornerstone Festival 2007.

Background information
- Origin: Manchester, Connecticut, United States
- Genres: Christian hardcore, post-hardcore, melodic hardcore, metalcore
- Years active: 1999–2008, 2011–present
- Labels: Come & Live!; Solid State; Indianola; Floodgate
- Members: Josh Kellam; Jeremy Kellam; Todd Mackey; James Allen; Dave Swanson; Andy Nelson
- Past members: Andrew Bradley; Jason DiNitto; John Young; Casey McCue; Mike Saracino; John Gaskill; Corey Stroffolino
- Website: Life in Your Way on Facebook

Life in Your Way (also known as LIYW) is a Christian hardcore band from Connecticut.

== History ==
=== Origins (1999–2002) ===
The band was formed by two childhood friends Josh Kellam and Todd Mackey. Jeremy Kellam joined the band to play bass after the dissolution of his former band, which also included Casey McCue who played second guitar for a short period and was then replaced by Jason DiNitto.

The band played many concerts throughout the Northeastern United States, quickly garnering acclaim and a rapidly multiplying fan-base. The band stayed a four piece for some time. At that time they befriended a band called Solace from New York, with whom they released a split CD entitled The Heart and Flesh Cry Out. The musical style of the band at that time far more influenced by metalcore than their later material. Todd who later played guitar for the band, played drums in this incarnation.

=== The Sun Rises and the Sun Sets... and Still Our Time is Endless (2002–2006) ===
Jay exited the band and after a short hiatus, Todd transitioned to guitar and the band recruited John Young to take his place as drummer. They also added Andrew Bradley as second guitarist. The hiatus and the line-up changes sparked a dramatic stylistic transformation, which was sonically captured on the four song demo entitled 'All These Things Tie Me Down'. Released in 2002 the sharp contrast of the demo with their earlier split CD only further fanned the flames of their popularity. The demo attracted Indianola Records, who signed the band, and released their first two full-length records. The first, The Sun Rises and the Sun Sets... and Still Our Time is Endless, which was released in 2003, and their second, Ignite and Rebuild, which was released in 2005. The latter was also released in the Christian Market by Floodgate Records, and in Europe by Guideline Records.

=== Member changes, and Waking Giants (2006–2008) ===
After the recording of The Sun Rises and the Sun Sets..., Todd left the band to pursue an opportunity singing for the band With Honor. He was replaced for a short time by the former guitarist of the band Solace, Mike Saracino. Several tours into promoting the record, John Young left the band, and not long after Andrew Bradley left as well.

The band went on a hiatus due to the lack of sufficient band members and started holding auditions for replacements. They chose a drummer, John Gaskill, a resident of Virginia, and also recruited two local guitarists from the defunct rock band October War, Dave Swanson and James Allen.

Once their contract with Indianola Records expired, the band signed with Solid State Records in June 2006. Their first, and only full-length record for Solid State Records entitled Waking Giants, was produced by Garth Richardson, and released on March 6, 2007. Shortly after the release of Waking Giants, guitarist Dave Swanson left the band to play guitar for Texas-based electro-pop-rock band PlayRadioPlay!, and not long after, was followed by James Allen. To replace the two departed guitarists, the band rejoined with former guitarist Todd Mackey, and recruited Corey Stroffolino of the fellow Connecticut band, The Risk Taken.

=== Disbanding (2008–2011) ===
The band was set to play its final concert at the Heirloom Arts Theatre in Danbury, Connecticut on July 12, 2008, to a sold-out crowd, reuniting with several former members who played with the band in a revolving line-up at the concert.

Due to the sell-out, the band reunited for a concert not long after on December 20, 2008. At this concert the band performed alongside Wrench in the Works, The Risk Taken, Our Final Say, and With Honor, who had also reunited for the concert.

=== Re-formation and Kingdoms (2011–2016) ===
On February 11, 2011, the band announced they had re-formed, and while several former members returned to the band, John Gaskill was succeeded by Andy Nelson formerly of the band Wrench in the Works as drummer.

The band stated they would be releasing a new record entitled 'Kingdoms', and later clarified through a Twitter post that Kingdoms will not be traditional full-length album, but rather will be released successively as three EPs which will be entitled The Kingdom of Man, The Kingdom of Darkness and The Kingdom of God which was released on Come&Live! Records for free in 2011.

The band opened a Kickstarter campaign for fans to help raise money for the record, and the project met the projected goal of $12,500 in 3 days, 7 hours with 304 backers according to the band members' facebook posts.

The band's comeback show was July 16, 2011 at Toad's Place in New Haven, Connecticut.

=== Upcoming (2016–present) ===
After Kingdoms was released, the band remained inactive. On May 26, 2016, the band released a video saying "Life in Your Way 2017", hinting at new shows and music. The band played Souled Out Festival. While the band was due to release their fifth album in 2017, nothing has been released. The band was set to perform at Birmingham, AL's Furnace Fest 2020 before dropping off during the midst of a pandemic. The band performed at Furnace Fest in 2022. In March 2024, the band announced via their Facebook page they would perform at Capulet Fest 2024 at the Thompson Speedway, but withdrew June 27 from the event.

On July 2, 2026, the band announced their plans for an October play through of their entire album, Waking Giants. The show is set to take place at The Space Ballroom in Hamden, Connecticut.

== Band members ==
=== Current members ===
- Joshua Kellam – lead vocals (1999-2008, 2011–present)
- James Allen – clean vocals, guitar (2004-2007, 2011–present)
- David Swanson – guitar, background vocals (2004-2007, 2011–present)
- Todd Mackey – guitar, background vocals, (2001-2003, 2007–2008, 2011–present) drums (1999-2001)
- Jeremy Kellam – bass (1999-2008, 2011–present)
- Andy Nelson – drums (2011–present) (formerly of Wrench in the Works)

=== Former members ===
- Andrew Bradley - guitar (2001-2005)
- Jason "Sorterz" DiNitto - guitar (1999-2001)
- John Young - drums (2001-2005)
- Casey McCue - guitar (1999)
- Mike Saracino - guitar (2003-2004)
- John Gaskill - drums (2005-2008) (Now in Comrades)
- Corey Stroffolino - guitar (2007-2008)

== Related projects ==
Current musical projects involving past and present members of the band are:

- The Frozen Ocean (Dave Swanson)
- Barricades (James Allen)
- The Attending (Corey Stroffolino)
- Endeavor (John Gaskill)
- Wrench in the Works (Andy Nelson)
- With Honor (Todd Mackey)

== Discography ==
- Demos (2000) (Self Released)
- The Heart and Flesh Cry Out (Split with Solace) (2001) (Salad Dressing Records)
- All These Things Tie Me Down (2002)
- The Sun Rises and the Sun Sets... and Still Our Time is Endless (2003) (Indianola Records)
- Ignite and Rebuild (2005) (Indianola Records/Guideline Records)
- Waking Giants (2007) (Solid State Records)
- Kingdoms (2011) (Kingdom Records/ Come&Live!)
