= Suspended Sunrise Recordings =

- Founded: 2011
- Founder: Aaron Rodgers; Ryan Zachary
- Genre: Pop; rock; folk; alternative
- Country of origin: U.S.
- Location: San Diego, California

Suspended Sunrise Recordings is an independent record label based in San Diego, California. The label was created by Aaron Rodgers, an NFL quarterback in 2009. Ryan Zachary is a co-founder. SSR officially became active when signing its first band, The Make, in May 2011.

The label released The Make's debut single, "Get It", with a video for the song on June 30, 2011. The video was directed by Murphy Karges of Sugar Ray and was shot in a Northern California bowling alley near Rodgers' and Zachary's hometown of Chico. It features dancing police officers, showgirls, Jimmy Richards of Brighten on drums, and cameos by both Rodgers and Zachary. "Get It" caught the attention of ESPN and several other news outlets and had 38,000 views on YouTube in the first 30 days of release.

In October 2011, Suspended Sunrise Recordings announced Karges has been named the president of the company.
