= Acoustic (Britt Nicole EP) =

EP by Britt Nicole
- Released: August 24, 2010
- Recorded: 2010
- Genre: Acoustic
- Label: Sparrow
- Producer: Christopher Stevens: Ed Cash

Britt Nicole chronology
The Lost Get Found (2009)	Acoustic (2010)	Gold (2012)

Professional ratings
Review scores
Source	Rating
Jesus Freak Hideout	4.5/5 stars

Acoustic is the third extended play by Christian pop recording artist Britt Nicole. It includes five acoustic versions of previous songs and a brand new song entitled "Found By You", co-written by Brandon Heath. It debuted at No. 22 on Billboard's Hot Christian Albums chart, which is her second highest entry to date.

== Track listing ==
Album release
No.	Title	Writer(s)	Length
1.	"Hanging On"	Andrew Fromm, Jason Ingram, Britt Nicole	3:09
2.	"Set The World On Fire"	Ingram, Cindy Morgan, Nicole	3:41
3.	"Headphones"	Joshua Crosby, Nicole	3:23
4.	"Walk On the Water"	Crosby, Dan Muckala, Nicole	3:47
5.	"The Lost Get Found"	Ben Glover, Nicole	3:55
6.	"Found By You"	Brandon Heath, Nicole	3:57
Total length:			21:52

== Charts ==
Chart (2010)	Peak position
US Top Christian Albums	22
