= The Remixes (Britt Nicole album) =

Remix album by Britt Nicole
- Released: March 17, 2015
- Genre: Christian electronic dance music
- Length: 43:52
- Label: Capitol CMG

Britt Nicole chronology
| Gold (2012) | The Remixes (2015) | Britt Nicole (2016) |

Singles from The Remixes
- 1. "Holiday (MyKidBrother Remix)" Released: 2015 (United Kingdom); 2. "Glow (J Sapp Remix)" Released: 2015 (United Kingdom)

The Remixes is the first remix album by Britt Nicole. Capitol Christian Music Group released the album on March 17, 2015.

== Critical reception ==
Professional ratings
Review scores
| Source | Rating |
|---|---|
| 365 Days of Inspiring Media | 4/5 stars |
| CCM Magazine | 4/5 stars |
| Christian Review Magazine | 5/5 stars |
| CM Addict | 3/5 stars |
| Cross Rhythms | 7/10 squares |
| The Front Row Report | 8/10 stars |
| Jesus Freak Hideout | 3/5 stars |
| Louder Than the Music | 3.5/5 stars |
| New Release Tuesday | 4.5/5 stars |
| Worship Leader | 4/5 stars |

Awarding the album four stars for CCM Magazine, Andy Argyrakis writes, "her three studio albums to date have been ripe with bountiful beats, which leap to even greater life thanks to groove-saturated tweaks from both established and underground DJ's/ producers". Christopher Smith, rating the album three stars from Jesus Freak Hideout, states, "The Remixes has a respectable spread of dance tunes and creative tracks, but the safe and clumsy songs make this a less valuable purchase." Giving the album a seven out of ten rating, Tim Holden at Cross Rhythms says, "Perfectionists will pick out some faults, like mismatched beats and weak editing, but as the songs are pretty strong to start with they manage to come out of it sounding okay even with the faults." Rating the album four and a half stars at New Release Tuesday, Caitlin Lassiter describes, "Each song proved to be transformed for the better, and it never felt like too much or too little." Mike Pueschell, awarding the album four stars for Worship Leader, states, "The Remixes featuring fresh arrangements of her best songs over the years."

Jono Davies, giving the album three and a half stars from Louder Than the Music, writes, "Some songs on this album are more creative than others, but at the end of the day, these are top songs from a top vocalist." In a three star review, Andrew Funderburk of CM Addict says, "It is still fun and creative at its respective points, but ultimately it doesn’t live up to the potential that it could have had." Awarding the album five stars for Christian Review Magazine, Leah St. John states, "The Remixes is a replay-worthy collection of awesome tracks." Indicating in a four-star review at 365 Days of Inspiring Media, Micah Garnett describes only one "minor gripe on an otherwise outstanding remix album." Reggie Edwards, writing for The Front Row Report, rating the album eight stars out of ten, says, "While the Remixes doesn't offer up any original song material, you get the feeling of listening to an all-new record."

== Track listing ==
| No. | Title | Length |
|---|---|---|
| 1. | "Ready or Not (Phenomenon Remix By Soul Glow Activatur)" (featuring Lecrae) | 2:58 |
| 2. | "The Lost Get Found (Neon Feather Remix)" | 3:23 |
| 3. | "Amazing Life (Capital Kings Remix)" | 3:07 |
| 4. | "Like a Star (MyKidBrother Remix)" | 3:20 |
| 5. | "All This Time (Pro_Fitt Remix)" | 4:25 |
| 6. | "Walk on the Water (Phenomenon Remix By Soul Glow Activatur)" | 4:07 |
| 7. | "Set the World on Fire (Neon Feather Remix)" | 3:50 |
| 8. | "Glow (JSapp Remix)" | 3:53 |
| 9. | "Holiday (MyKidBrother Remix)" | 3:43 |
| 10. | "Gold (Lark Remix)" | 3:02 |
| 11. | "The Sun Is Rising (Horizon Remix)" | 4:57 |
| 12. | "Gold (Jason Nevins Rhythmic Remix/Bonus Track)" | 3:07 |
| Total length: | | 43:52 |

== Charts ==
| Chart (2015) | Peak position |
|---|---|
| US Top Christian Albums (Billboard) | 27 |
| US Top Dance Albums (Billboard) | 8 |
