= Britt Nicole =

American singer-songwriter (born 1984)

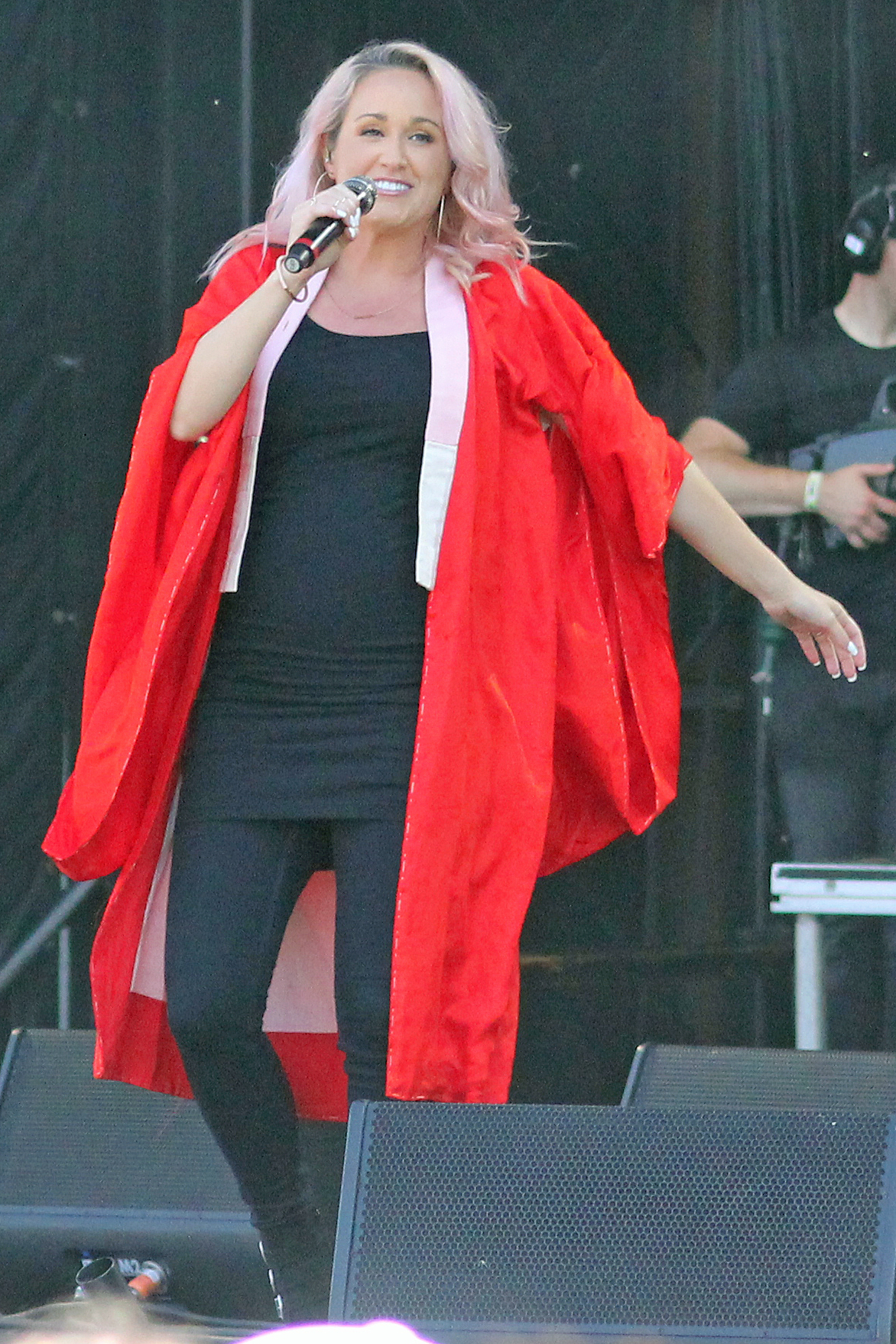
- Britt Nicole performing in 2018

Background information
- Also known as: Brittany Waddell
- Born: Brittany Nicole Waddell; Kannapolis, North Carolina, U.S.
- Origin: Salisbury, North Carolina, U.S.
- Genre: Christian pop
- Occupations: Singer; songwriter; producer
- Instrument: Vocals
- Years active: 2003–present
- Labels: Sparrow, Capitol
- Spouse: Joshua Crosby (m. 2012, divorced 2020)
- Website: brittnicole.com

Brittany Nicole Waddell, better known by her stage name Britt Nicole, is an American singer and songwriter. After pursuing music independently, Nicole signed with Sparrow and Capitol Records and released the album Say It in 2007, which saw commercial success. In 2009 she released The Lost Get Found which peaked at number one on the Billboard Top Christian Albums chart and was supported with the singles "The Lost Get Found" and "Walk on the Water".

In 2012, she found critical and commercial success with the album Gold and its title single which debuted at number 83 on the Billboard Hot 100. The album also peaked atop the Top Christian Albums chart and received a Grammy Award nomination for Best Contemporary Christian Music Album. She released a self-titled album in 2016 which saw limited commercial success. In late 2025 she independently released II II V, her first album in nearly a decade.

== Early life ==
Brittany Nicole Waddell was born in Kannapolis, North Carolina and began singing at the age of three in her church, Truth Temple of Kannapolis. She, along with her brother and cousin, eventually became involved with the church's daily program on Charlotte TV station WAXN. She was a talented dancer, taking ballet, jazz, hip hop, and lyrical. At South Rowan High School, she was a member of the school's advanced choir group, and performed with them at Carnegie Hall in New York. Waddell was also a member of Duke University's Brightleaf Music Workshop.

== Career ==
=== 2003–2011 ===
Waddell turned down a scholarship from Belmont University in Nashville, Tennessee, to pursue a full-time music career. She felt that God was telling her to concentrate on singing instead of going to college. On January 10, 2003, she released her debut album, Follow the Call, an independent release as Brittany Waddell. In 2004, she signed a management deal with Vertical Entertainment, and then signed a development deal with Word Records. Also in 2004 she released her debut extended play, Brittany Waddell. In 2006 she signed with Sparrow Records and her song "Indestructible" was featured on the WOW Next 2007 compilation CD, and she performed at Creation East/West, Spirit West Coast Monterey, ALIVE 11 festival, and Celebrate Freedom. She was featured on Christian hip-hop group GRITS' 2006 album, Redemption, on the songs "Right Back" and "Soul Cry", both under the name Brittany Waddell.

On May 22, 2007, she released her second album Say It. It peaked at No. 40 on Billboard's Christian Albums chart. The debut single from the album, "You", was released on March 27, 2007. It hit the Top 10 on the R&R magazine chart. It was the 12th most played song on Christian Hit Radio stations in 2007, according to R&R magazine. It also peaked at No. 6 on Billboard's Hot Christian Songs, her highest charting song to date. Nicole was the opening act on the 2007 Winter Jam Tour with Sanctus Real, Hawk Nelson, Jeremy Camp, Steven Curtis Chapman, and Newsong. Waddell's song "Sunshine Girl" was featured on MTV's teen reality show Newport Harbor: The Real Orange County on September 5, 2007.

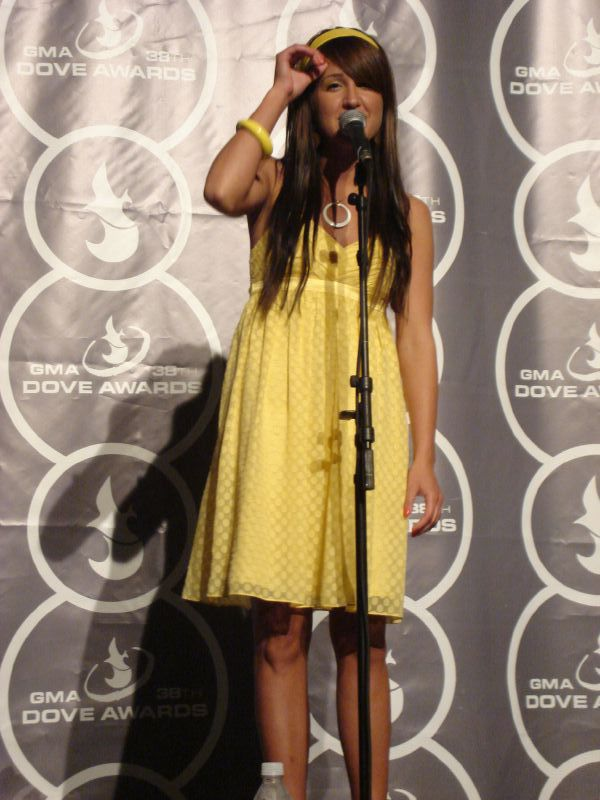
Britt Nicole at the 39th GMA Dove Awards

Waddell's first music video, for the song "Believe", premiered on the Gospel Music Channel on September 22, 2007. The song was then released as the album's second single on October 30, 2007. It was the 21st most-played song of 2008 on Christian Pop radio stations according to R&R magazine's Christian CHR chart. On November 20, 2007, Nicole released her first EP titled Holiday Trio. The EP was Christmas-themed and was only released digitally. It featured her song "Holiday", plus two never before released songs; one is an original titled "Come What May", and the other is a cover song of the holiday hit "Last Christmas".

"Set the World on Fire" was released as Say It's third and final US single in early 2008. The song peaked at No. 11 on Billboard's Hot Christian Songs. In 2007 and 2008, "Holiday" and "When She Cries" were both released as UK singles, while "Don't Worry Now" was released as a single in Australia where she was named Australian Christian radio’s Artist of the Year.

In 2009, Waddell released a new song "The Lost Get Found" to promote her third album by the same name. The song debuted in the Top 20 of the Billboard Hot Christian Songs chart, at No. 20, and peaked at No. 8. It peaked at No. 1 on Christian radio stations. The music video for the song was released as a single on iTunes on November 17, 2009. The single also included a remix and karaoke version of the track. The Lost Get Found was released on August 11, 2009, and peaked at No. 1 on Billboard's Christian Albums Chart and No. 62 on the Billboard 200. The same month, the music video for her song "Holiday" (from Say It) was posted on YouTube.

Her second US single from The Lost Get Found, "Walk on the Water", peaked at No. 17 on the Billboard Hot Christian Songs chart and No. 1 on Christian radio. It was promoted on the NBC television show The Biggest Loser. Meanwhile, the song "Headphones" was released as her second single from The Lost Get Found in the UK. It peaked at No. 2 on the UK Christian CHR chart. On January 1, 2010, a compilation album, Acoustic Playlist: Bold, was released under StarSong. It featured an acoustic version of Waddell's single "Believe". Her second EP Acoustic was released August 24, 2010, to stores and online. It includes five acoustic versions of previous songs and a brand new song, "Found By You". The album debuted at No. 22 on the Hot Christian Albums chart. Her third single from The Lost Get Found, "Hanging On", was released in July to coincide with the release of the album. It peaked at No. 19 on the Billboard Hot Christian Songs chart.

In early 2010, "Welcome to the Show" was released as a single in the UK. It peaked at No. 4 on the country's Christian CHR chart. Later, in the middle of the year, the song "Safe" was released as a single in the UK. It peaked at No. 3 on the country's Christian CHR chart. A music video for "Headphones" was released on November 9, 2010. In December 2010, "Have Your Way" was released as a single in the UK. It peaked at No. 4 on the UK's Christian CHR chart.

=== 2012–present ===
On December 21, 2011, Waddell announced the release of her fourth album which was preceded by the January release of "All This Time", the album's lead single. It was the No. 1 song on Christian pop radio for eight weeks in a row and also peaked at No. 3 on Billboard's Hot Christian Songs chart. The album, titled Gold, was released on March 26, 2012. The album debuted at No. 1 on the Hot Christian albums chart and No. 41 on the Billboard 200, the highest charting album on that chart for the singer. The singles "Stand" and "Breakthrough" were released to United States and United Kingdom Christian radio, respectively, in the fall of 2012. "Stand" peaked at No. 11 on US Christian pop radio and "Breakthrough" peaked at No. 3 on UK Christian Pop radio. In December 2012, she released two Christmas music videos, "Jingle Bell Rock" and "O Holy Night".

Waddell announced that she signed to Capitol Records and released "Gold" as her debut single for mainstream pop radio on December 4, 2012. A re-release of her album, Gold, was released on February 26, 2013, to mainstream pop markets. On January 11, 2013, she released a Gold EP with the radio version of "Gold", two remixes of "Gold" and the "Gold" music video. Nicole was featured on Tenth Avenue North's Christmas single "We Three Kings", which along with her own song "O Come All Ye Faithful" are included on WOW Christmas Blue released September 24, 2013. In 2014, "The Sun Is Rising" was included as part of the soundtrack of the film, The Other Woman, gaining popularity without being an official single.

Her first remix album, The Remixes, was released March 17, 2015. "Through Your Eyes", the lead single from Britt Nicole's fifth studio album was released on July 29, 2016. On September 1, 2016, People Magazine announced Nicole's fifth studio album, Britt Nicole, to be released on October 7, 2016 supported by "Be the Change" and "Pave" as promotional singles off the album. Britt Nicole was released on October 7, 2016, in standard and deluxe editions. After several non-album singles Nicole released II II V on November 20, 2025, her first album in ten years.

== Personal life ==
Waddell's parents divorced when she was seven. This was mentioned in her song "Don't Worry Now" and "All This Time". On July 1, 2012, she married Joshua Crosby. On February 5, 2013, Waddell announced that she was pregnant with her first child and gave birth to a girl, Ella Brave Crosby on July 24, 2013.

Waddell and her husband had a daughter born in 2013, a son in 2015 and another son in 2019. They separated shortly afterward.

In December 2019, Waddell was one of several evangelical worship artists who prayed for President Donald Trump in the Oval Office.

== Discography ==
- Follow the Call (2003)
- Say It (2007)
- The Lost Get Found (2009)
- Gold (2012)
- Britt Nicole (2016)
- II II V (2025)

== Concert tours ==
- You're Worth More Than Gold Tour (2012)
- This Is Not a Test Tour (2015)
- Hits Deep Tour (2016)

== Awards and nominations ==
=== TRAA Awards ===
Year	Category	Nominee	Result	Ref
2008	Artist of the Year	Herself	Won	

=== GMA Dove Awards ===
Year	Category	Nominee	Result	Ref
2011	Female Vocalist of the Year	Herself	Nominated	

=== Grammy Awards ===
Year	Category	Nominee	Result	Ref
2013	Best Contemporary Christian Music Album	Gold	Nominated	

=== K-Love Fan Awards ===
Year	Category	Nominee	Result	Ref
2014	Female Artist of the Year	Herself	Nominated	

=== We Love Christian Music Awards ===
Year	Category	Nominee	Result	Ref
2012	Female Artist of the Year	Herself	Won	
2016	Female Artist of the Year	Herself	Won	
2025	Pop Song of the Year	"Keep Going"	Nominated	
