= Jeff Schneeweis =

American singer-songwriter

- Birth name: Jeff G. Schneeweis
- Also known as: Lael
- Born: June 1, 1981 (age 44); Long Beach, California, US
- Genres: Christian rock, indie, pop, electronic, ambient
- Occupation(s): Musician, Record Producer
- Instrument(s): Vocals, guitar, piano, drums
- Years active: 2002–present
- Labels: Tooth & Nail, Floodgate, Suspended Sunrise
- Website: laelsounds.com

Jeff G. Schneeweis (born June 1, 1981) is an American singer, songwriter, multi-instrumentalist, audio engineer and record producer from Redding, California, best known as the founder and vocalist/guitar player for Number One Gun, with whom he released five studio albums (two of which were fully recorded and produced by Schneeweis as a solo artist) and one EP.

In 2011, Schneeweis and his Number One Gun bandmate, bassist Trevor Sellers, and Sarah Ann (from See You Soon) formed the trio The Make and released This Box EP.

In 2013, Schneeweis started a solo project under his own name and released two EPs, but in 2015 changed his creative moniker to Lael.

Throughout his career, Schneeweis worked with and produced for a number of artists including Abigail Breslin, Nolan Gross, Luna, Luna, Bethel Music

== Discography ==
With Number One Gun

- see Number One Gun

With The Make

- 2011 - This Box EP

As Jeff Schneeweis

- 2013 - Covers EP
- 2013 - Closer EP

As Lael

- 2016 - Clarity
- 2017 - Phoenix
- 2019 - "Bike on spotify"
