= Floodgate Records =

Independent record label

- Parent company: East West Records
- Founded: 2000
- Founder: Tim Taber
- Defunct: 2008
- Status: Defunct
- Distributor(s): Word Records
- Genre: Rock, alternative rock, Christian rock
- Country of origin: United States
- Official website: floodgaterecords.com

Floodgate Records was a part of the East West Records family of labels. It was founded in 2000 and managed by Tim Taber (formerly of The Prayer Chain). Distribution was through Word Records and marketing through Rocketown. Their first release was All I Have, a worship album by Rita Springer. The label ceased operations at an unknown point before mid-2008.

== Artists ==
- Bernard
- Brian & Jenn Johnson
- Cool Hand Luke
- Denison Marrs
- East West
- Forever Changed
- Hundred Year Storm
- The Insyderz
- Life in Your Way
- Kate Miner
- Mourning September
- The Myriad
- Number One Gun
- Oceans Firing
- Rita Springer
- Transition (not to be confused with a UK indie band of the same name)
- Yellow Second

== See also ==
- List of Christian record labels
