= Rachel Platten discography =

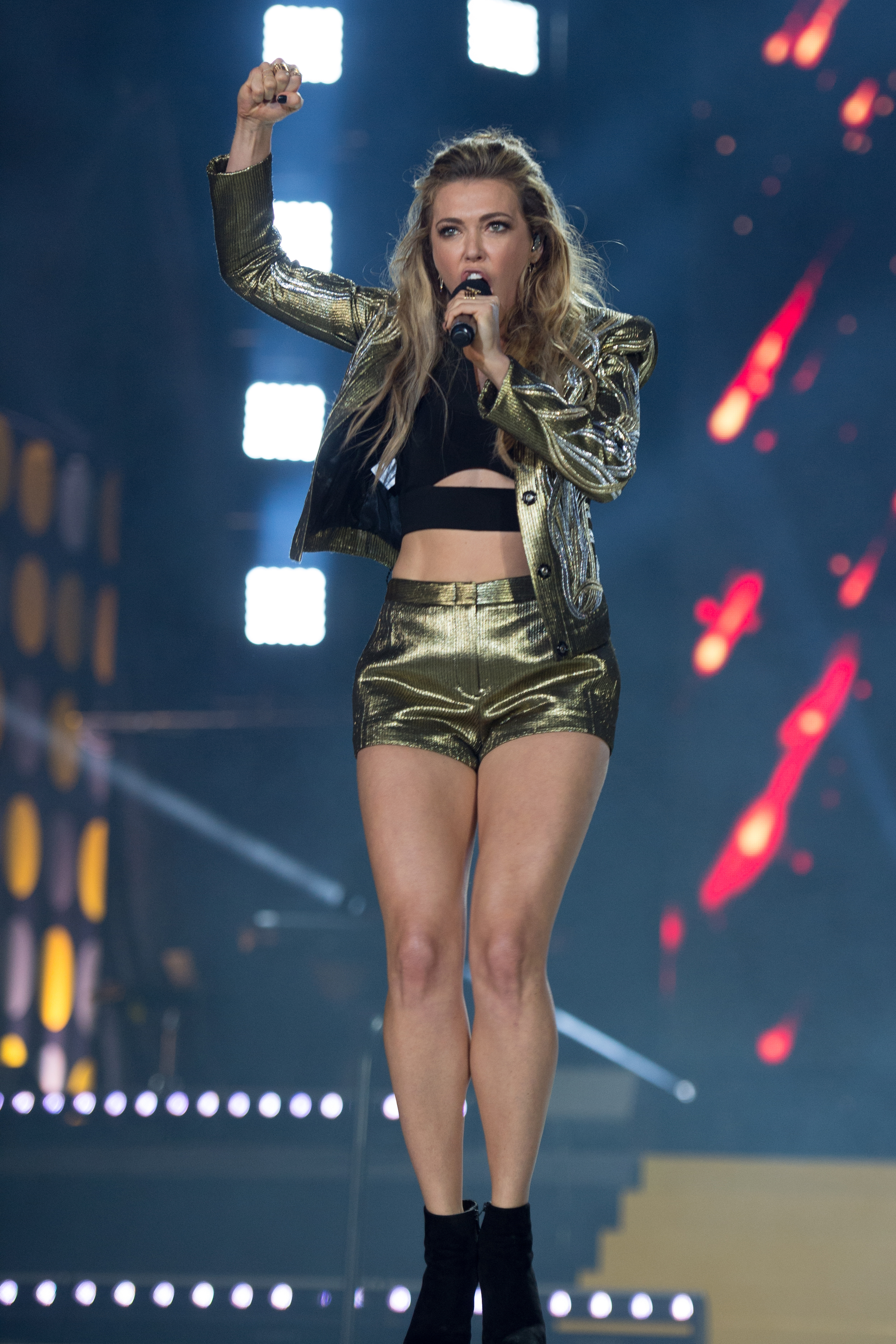
- Platten at the 2016 Invictus Games ceremony.
- Studio albums: 5
- EPs: 3
- Singles: 12
- Music videos: 9
- Features: 3
- Promotional singles: 4

The discography of Rachel Platten, an American singer and songwriter, consists of five studio albums, three extended play and twelve singles. Platten released her debut studio album Trust in Me in 2003, which she has called "a collection of demos". Her second album, Be Here, was released from Rock Ridge Music in 2011. Her 2011 single "1,000 Ships" peaked at number 24 on the US Billboard Adult Top 40 chart, also playing at various radio stations. In the spring of 2015, Platten released "Fight Song" from Wildfire. The song has been used in various media, as well as serving the official anthem for the 2016 Democratic presidential nominee Hillary Clinton. It reached number six on the US Billboard Hot 100, number two on the Australian Singles Chart, number six in Ireland, number eight in New Zealand, number nine on the Billboard Canadian Hot 100 and number one on the UK Singles Chart. It has been certified Diamond in the US. Platten's 2015 Fight Song EP reached number 20 on the Billboard 200. On September 11, 2015, Platten released her second single, "Stand by You" from Wildfire. It has peaked in the top ten on charts in Canada and the United States, and has peaked in the top twenty on charts in Australia and Poland. The song has since been certified Platinum in the United States. "Broken Glass", the lead single from her fourth studio album, Waves, was released on August 18, 2017. The album was released on October 27, 2017.

Seven years after the release of Waves, on September 3, 2024, Platten released her fifth studio album titled I Am Rachel Platten under her own label Violet Records.

== Studio albums ==
Title	Details	Peak chart positions									Certifications
Title	Details	US	AUS	CAN	IRE	JPN	NZ	SWE	SWI	UK	Certifications
Trust in Me	Released: 2003; Format: CD	—	—	—	—	—	—	—	—	—	
Be Here	Released: April 26, 2011; Label: Rock Ridge; Format: Digital download, CD	—	—	—	—	—	—	—	—	—	
Wildfire	Released: January 1, 2016; Label: Columbia; Format: Digital download, CD	5	12	6	84	38	37	29	85	35	RIAA: Gold; RMNZ: Platinum
Waves	Released: October 27, 2017; Label: Columbia; Format: Digital download, CD	73	—	—	—	142	—	—	—	—	
I Am Rachel Platten	Released: September 3, 2024; Label: Violet Records; Format: Digital download, CD	—	—	—	—	—	—	—	—	—	
"—" denotes a recording that did not chart or was not released.

== Extended plays ==
Title	Details	Peak chart positions	Sales
Title	Details	US	Sales
Fight Song	Released: May 19, 2015; Label: Columbia; Format: Digital download, CD	20	US: 26,000
I Know	Released: July 10, 2024; Label: Violet Records; Format: Digital download, streaming	—	
Fight Song (Rachel's Version)	Released: September 26, 2025; Label: Violet Records; Format: Digital download, streaming	—	

== Singles ==
=== As lead artist ===
Title	Year	Peak chart positions											Certifications	Album
Title	Year	US	US Adult	AUS	AUT	CAN	GER	IRE	NZ	SWE	SWI	UK	Certifications	Album
"1,000 Ships"	2011	—	23	—	—	—	—	—	—	—	—	—		Be Here
"Fight Song" (Note: "Fight Song" also appears on the EP Fight Song.)	2015	6	1	2	13	5	76	6	8	56	38	1	RIAA: Diamond; ARIA: 5× Platinum; BPI: 3× Platinum; BVMI: Gold; GLF: Gold; MC: 3× Platinum; RMNZ: 4× Platinum	Wildfire
"Stand by You"	2015	37	1	14	—	42	—	—	—	— (Note: "Stand by You" did not enter the Swedish Singles Chart, but peaked at number 10 on the Swedish Heatseeker chart.)	—	—	RIAA: Platinum; ARIA: Platinum; MC: Gold; RMNZ: Gold	Wildfire
"Better Place"	2016	—	21	—	—	—	—	—	—	—	—	—		Wildfire
"Broken Glass"	2017	—	17	—	—	—	—	—	—	—	—	—		Waves
"You Belong"	2018	—	—	—	—	—	—	—	—	—	—	—		Non-album singles
"Soldiers"	2020	—	—	—	—	—	—	—	—	—	—	—		Non-album singles
"Girls"	2023	—	—	—	—	—	—	—	—	—	—	—		I Am Rachel Platten
"Mercy"	2024	—	—	—	—	—	—	—	—	—	—	—		I Am Rachel Platten
"Bad Thoughts"	2024	—	—	—	—	—	—	—	—	—	—	—		I Am Rachel Platten
"I Know"	2024	—	—	—	—	—	—	—	—	—	—	—		I Am Rachel Platten
"Set Me Free"	2024	—	—	—	—	—	—	—	—	—	—	—		I Am Rachel Platten
"Bad Thoughts"	2025	—	—	—	—	—	—	—	—	—	—	—		Non-album single
"—" denotes a recording that did not chart or was not released.

=== As featured artist ===
Title	Year	Peak chart positions	Album
Title	Year	US Dance	Album
"Same As Me" (Diego Torres featuring Rachel Platten)	2016	—	Non-album single
"Little Bit of Love" (Tritonal featuring Rachel Platten)	2019	16	U & Me
"Nothing's Impossible" (A Great Big World featuring Rachel Platten)	2023	—	The Imaginary
"Unfolding" (Lindsey Stirling featuring Rachel Platten)	2025	—	Duality (Deluxe)

=== Promotional singles ===
List of promotional singles
Title	Year	Album	Ref.
"Nothing Ever Happens"	2011	Be Here	
"Lone Ranger"	2015	Wildfire	
"Perfect for You"	2017	Waves	
"Collide"	2017	Waves	

== Other appearances ==
Title	Year	Album	Ref.
"Thank You for Being a Friend"	2017	My Little Pony: The Movie	
"Wonder"	2019	Wonder Park	

== Music videos ==
List of music videos, showing year released and directors
Title	Year	Director	Ref.
"Nothing Ever Happens"	2011	Duffy Higgins	
"1,000 Ships"	2011	—N/a	
"Fight Song"	2015	James Lees	
"Stand By You"	2015	Hannah Lux Davis	
"Better Place"	2016	Matt Stawski	
"Broken Glass"	2017	Allie Avital	
"You Belong"	2018	Michael Mazur	
"Girls"	2023	Mark Jeffrey	
"Bad Thoughts"	2024	Jade Ehlers & Brooke Harcrow	
