= Telecast =

Telecast may refer to:

- Television broadcast
- Telecast (band), a Christian band from the United States

== See also ==
- Telecaster, guitar
