= Echoes of Love =

Echoes of Love may refer to:

- "Echoes of Love", a 1964 song by Elvis Presley in Kissin' Cousins
- "Echoes of Love" (The Doobie Brothers song), 1977
- Echoes of Love, a 2010 book by Rosie Rushton
- Echoes of Love, a 2012 music album by Omar Akram which won a Grammy Award for Best New Age Album
- "Echoes of Love", a 2016 song and 2017 extended play by Jesse & Joy

== See also ==
- Echo of Love, a 2012 album by An Epic No Less
