= Value Pac =

American Christian pop punk band

- Origin: Orange County, California
- Genres: Christian punk, pop punk, indie punk
- Years active: 1995–2001
- Label: Tooth & Nail
- Past members: Ryan Sheely; Sean Paul; Jason Feltman; Sean Humeston; Ben Cater; Isaiah Coughran

Value Pac was an American Christian punk band from Orange County, California. The band started making music in 1995 and disbanded in 2001, consisting of the following members during their tenure as a band: Ryan Sheely, Sean Paul, Jason Feltman, Sean Humeston, Ben Cater, and Isaiah Coughran. The band released their first two albums, Value Pac or Down & Out (1995) and Jalapeño (1997), with Tooth & Nail Records and their final album, Incognito (2000), with Four Door Entertainment .

== Background ==
Value Pac was a Christian punk band from Orange County, California. The members during their tenure were lead vocalist and lead guitarist, Ryan Sheely, bassist and background vocalist, Sean Paul, drummer, Jason Feltman, bassist, Sean Humeston, drummer, Ben Cater, and bassist, Isaiah Coughran. Ethan Luck filled in on drums for two years, and guitar on two.

The band commenced as a musical entity in 1995, with their first release, Value Pac or Down & Out, depending on sources, a studio album, released on March 24, 1995, from Tooth & Nail Records. Their subsequent album, Jalapeño, was released by Tooth & Nail Records, on July 29, 1997. This album was their breakthrough release upon the Billboard magazine charts, where it peaked at No. 20 on the Christian Albums chart. The group's final album, Incognito, was released on November 21, 2000, with Four Door Records.

== Members ==
Final known line-up

- Ryan Sheely – lead vocals, lead guitar (1995–2001)
- Sean Paul – bass, background vocals (1998–2001)
- Jason Feltman – drums (2000–2001)

Former

- Sean Humeston – bass (1997–2000)
- Ben Cater – drums (1995–1997, 1999–2000)
- Isaiah Coughran – bass (1995–1997)

Session and touring musicians

- Ethan Luck – drums (1998–1999), guitar (1999–2000)

Timeline

== Discography ==
Studio albums

- Value Pac or Down & Out (March 24, 1995, Tooth & Nail)
- Jalapeño (July 29, 1997, Tooth & Nail)
- Incognito (November 21, 2000, Four Door Entertainment)
