= A Warm and Dark Embrace =

Studio album by Damien Deadson
- Released: January 29, 2012
- Recorded: Helms Deep (Winston-Salem, North Carolina)
- Genres: Metalcore; Alternative metal
- Label: Independent
- Producer: Ryan Helm

Damien Deadson chronology
A Warm and Dark Embrace (2012)	'Crown Me, Destroyer' (2014)

A Warm and Dark Embrace is Damien Deadson's first studio album, which was released on January 29, 2012. The album was recorded entirely by Ryan Helm in his home studio (Helms Deep) in Winston-Salem, North Carolina throughout 2010 and 2011. A Warm and Dark Embrace was mastered by Jamie King of The Basement Studio in Winston-Salem, North Carolina.

== Track List ==
All tracks are written by Damien Deadson.

No.	Title	Length
1.	"The Nothing"	3:48
2.	"Power Soak"	3:57
3.	"Patterns of Progress"	3:22
4.	"I Am Power"	4:13
5.	"Obelisk"	3:33
6.	"The Embrace"	0:43
7.	"Challenges of Change"	4:17
8.	"The Fault Line"	3:30
9.	"Righteous Pursuit of Revenge"	3:33
10.	"Night Sea Journey"	3:36
11.	"The Burning Sorrows (Part 1 - Heartbreak)"	2:51
12.	"The Burning Sorrows (Part 2 - Liberation)"	2:49

== Credits ==
- Written by Ryan Helm
- Recorded by Ryan Helm
- Produced by Ryan Helm
- Mixed by Ryan Helm
- Mastered by Jamie King
- Artwork by Justin Reich
