= Better Place (Rachel Platten song) =

Single by Rachel Platten

from the album Wildfire
- Released: May 9, 2016
- Genre: Pop
- Length: 2:56
- Label: Columbia
- Songwriters: Rachel Platten; Sally Seltmann
- Producer: Jon Levine

Rachel Platten singles chronology
| "Stand by You" (2015) | "Better Place" (2016) | "Siempre Estaré Ahí" (2016) |

Rachel Platten singles chronology
| "Stand by You" (2015) | "Better Place" (2016) | "Broken Glass" (2017) |

"Better Place" is a song recorded by American singer and songwriter Rachel Platten for her third studio album, Wildfire (2016). The record's third and final single, initially released as a promotional single on December 18, 2015, was distributed to Hot adult contemporary radio for airplay in the United States. Platten co-wrote the song with Sally Seltmann while Jon Levine served as the sole producer. The singer wrote the song after discovering her sister had become engaged, which she felt was inspirational.

"Better Place" divided music critics, with some praising the piano ballad's simplicity and production, and others finding it underwhelming. In the United States, it peaked at number 21 on the Adult Top 40 and peaked at number 227 on Russia's radio chart. An accompanying music video was directed by Matthew Stawski and released on May 9 of the same year. It features several couples and individuals gathering together and embracing each other. Platten dedicated it to her former school teacher and labeled it as a "social experiment". She has performed it on various occasions, including during an episode of Today Show and as part of a setlist on her summer concerts. The song appeared in the 2017 Microsoft Windows holiday commercial to promote Paint 3D.

== Background and recording ==
I wrote the song at "a tiny little place on 17th and there was a beautiful tree outside the window ... The sunlight would always look really golden and it would make me feel really hopeful about the day, even though things in my life weren't going great."

— Platten talks about the writing process with AXS (ticket merchant)

Platten's concept for "Better Place" developed following a phone call from her sister, Melanie, who announced her engagement to her then-boyfriend. She went on to describe it as one of her favorite tracks on the album, along with it being one of the easiest to write. Specifically, the singer wanted to display how her sister was longing for love and did not want to remain single. An editor on the singer's official website wrote that "Better Place" should serve as "the wedding song" of 2015.

Jon Levine handled the production of the track, in addition to playing the piano, electric keyboards, and bass instruments. Jon Sosin and Simon Huber also contributed, performing the guitar and cello, respectively. Columbia Records released "Better Place" as a digital download on December 18, 2015, although for those who had already pre-ordered Wildfire, it was available for as a free "instant grat" download. It was officially released as the album's third single on April 4, 2016, when it was distributed to Hot AC radio stations for airplay.

== Composition and lyrics ==
Markos Papadatos from Digital Journal described the track as "an ethereal ballad", which The Red and Black's Emma Korstanje found surprising due to the majority of Wildfire consisting of uplifting, electronic tracks. Alan Sculley of Oregon's The Register-Guard agreed, calling "Better Place" a "stripped back piano-based ballad". Furthermore, Melanie Leung from the South China Morning Post described the song as a "serene lullaby". Platten's vocals range from G_{3} to C_{5} over the key of C major; it is additionally accompanied by the instrumentation of a piano. While working with Platten, Seltmann came up with the original melody months before the singer finished the lyrics. Platten was able to complete the song after receiving a phone call from her sister announcing her engagement; she remarked that "the song just wrote itself after that".

Platten opens the song by singing the line, "I'll tell the world / I'll sing a song". She continues by a couple's mutual love for each other, "I see the whole world in your eyes / It's like I've known you all my life / We just feel so right". Platten stated that the song's lyrics revolve around finding positivity and optimism in everyday situations.

== Critical reception ==
"Better Place" received a mixed to positive response from music critics. Maura Johnston from The Boston Globe enjoyed "Better Place" and found it to be among the best on Wildfire. She claimed it "show[s] how Platten's songwriting skills can be used to tease out emotional subtleties." Papadatos, writing for Digital Journal, claimed that the track should "be enjoyed for its beauty and simplicity", while Clint Rhodes of The Herald-Standard declared it a "Well-crafted arrangement" that "give[s] prominence to the depth and genuineness of Platten's heartfelt messages disguised as delicious samples of pop delight". The Red and Black's Korstanje gave an extended opinion of this track and "Superman" while reviewing Wildfire and wrote: "These songs showcase Platten's technically imperfect, occasionally shaky vocals flawlessly, somehow working in her favor rather than harming her status as a singer/songwriter." Adam R. Holz, the founder of Plugged In, declared that the track was capable of bringing out an "aww" from the listener.

However, Tony Clayton-Lea, an editor for The Irish Times, gave a more mixed review towards the album (and "Better Place" in particular) and joked, "we predict your air-pumping fists will get tired by song six, 'Better Place'". The Young Folks's Brooke Pawling Stennett was even more disappointed, describing the song as a "last minute track". London Evening Standard's Rick Pearson panned "Better Place" and wrote, "this was music for the background not the spotlight".

== Chart performance ==
On the Adult Top 40 chart compiled by Billboard in the United States, Platten's single debuted at number 38 for the publication of April 23, 2016. By May 21 of the same year, "Better Place" reached its peak position at number 21. In total, the single lasted sixteen consecutive weeks on the Adult Top 40 charts. In Russia, "Better Place" debuted at number 393 on Russia's Tophit airplay chart for the week of January 17, 2016. Within four weeks it peaked at number 227 and spent a total of ten weeks on the chart altogether.

== Music video ==
A lyrical music video was released to Platten's Vevo account on April 21, 2016. The official video was directed by Matthew Stawski and produced by Austin Barbera, Missy Galanida, and Isaac Rice, with cameo appearances by Liev Schreiber, Mira Sorvino, Jennifer Garner, Steve Buscemi and Bryce Dallas Howard. It opens with an annotation reading, "For her 'Better Place' music video, Rachel wanted to conduct a social experiment with her fans". The singer is then shown walking around a couch before sitting down and turning on a nearby radio. After she departs the room, various couples and individuals are then welcomed into the room where they take a seat and listen to the song. All of the persons eventually grasps each other's hands or embrace. Towards the end of the song, Platten surprises the guests and greets them. Shortly after this, the screen fades to black.

Platten dedicated the visual to her music teacher in elementary school, Anne Scigliano. The singer spoke about Scigliano: "[she] gave me my first starring role in a play, and inspired me, and made me love the stage." The singer also commented regarding the filming shoot, "The entire day was such a love fest, casting actual fans to participate in this shoot really brought the concept to life. Surprising and singing along with them was just the icing on the cake. Every time I watch it I still get the feels!" The video for "Better Place" premiered on her Vevo account on May 9, 2016. It was released as a paid download in the United States on the following day. Emilee Linder from Fuse reacted positively to it, finding it to be inspiring and full of "syrupy goodness".

== Live performances ==
Platten performed the song live during a number of public appearances, including on the July 1, 2016 episode of the Today Show, where she sang during their promotional "July 4 Weekend" concert series. The singer also gave a rendition of "Fight Song" and "Stand by You" during the event. Platten also performed "Better Place" during various summer concerts in 2016, including at a stop in Indianapolis, Indiana, where she told the crowd that she had performed it at her sister's wedding two months prior.

== Credits and personnel ==
Credits adapted from the liner notes of Wildfire.

- Rachel Platten – vocals, writer
- Tom Coyne – mastering
- Simon Huber – cello
- Jon Levine – production, electric keyboards, piano, bass
- Sally Seltmann – writer
- Jon Sosin – guitar
- Joe Zook – mixing

== Charts ==
Chart performance for "Better Place"
| Chart (2016) | Peak position |
|---|---|
| Russia Airplay (Tophit) | 227 |
| US Adult Pop Airplay (Billboard) | 21 |
| US Pop Digital Songs (Billboard) | 41 |
