= Broken Glass (Rachel Platten song) =

Single by Rachel Platten

from the album Waves
- Released: August 18, 2017
- Genre: Pop
- Length: 2:59
- Label: Columbia
- Songwriter(s): Platten; Cyphert; Mikkel Eriksen; Jarrad Rogers
- Producer(s): Stargate; Jarrad Rogers

Rachel Platten singles chronology
"Siempre Estaré Ahí" (2016)	"Broken Glass" (2017)	"You Belong" (2018)

Music video
- "Broken Glass" on YouTube

"Broken Glass" is a song recorded by American singer Rachel Platten for her fourth and second major label studio album, Waves. It was released on August 18, 2017, by Columbia Records as the lead single from the album.

== Release ==
On August 14, 2017, Platten announced on her official Twitter account that a new single titled "Broken Glass" would be released on August 18.

== Composition ==
"Broken Glass" has been described as a "sharply produced pop jam", as well as a "mid-tempo bop" and "a breezy, dancehall-tinged number that is less adult contemporary than much of Wildfire", Platten's first major-label album. The song was co-written by Rachel Platten and Nate Cyphert, while the producers were Stargate and Jarrad Rogers. The track was recorded at Village Studios in Los Angeles, California.

Writing about her lyrical inspirations in an essay published on Refinery29, Platten described the song as her "rallying cry of release, healing, excitement, hope, and joy." She wrote, "It's a celebration of the power of women – of our unity, strength, and fierceness, and of just how freaking awesome we are. We are badass on our own, but we’re unstoppable when we come together." In an interview with Billboard, Platten said, "I felt like I wanted to continue and do my part to give a message of hope through music and promote girl power. Even though we have a long way to go to get equality between men and women, we're making progress, and when we lift each other up, that's dope. 'Broken Glass' is kind of about that message." In a USA Today interview, she credited her experiences at the Women's March as an inspiration for the song.

== Critical reception ==
Markos Papadatos of Digital Journal described "Broken Glass" as "quite powerful, and worthy to be her next smash hit", with "an inspirational and encouraging message to it". Writing for Radio.com, Scott T. Sterling called it "cathartic". Mike Wass of Idolator referred to the song as "an uplifting feminist anthem", while Taylor Weatherby of Billboard called it "a happy tune that serves as a confidence booster for any listener".

== Music video ==
The official music video for the song was released on August 18, 2017. It was directed by Allie Avital and filmed in Chinatown, Los Angeles. The video features female cyclists from around the world, including two German world champions.

== Live performances ==
Platten made the national television premiere performance of "Broken Glass" on ABC's Good Morning America on August 21, 2017. On November 26, 2017, she performed the song at the Miss Universe 2017 pageant in Las Vegas during the final walk of the Top 3 contestants before the announcement of the winner.

== Charts ==
Chart performance for "Broken Glass"
Chart (2017)	Peak position
US Adult Contemporary (Billboard)	25
US Adult Pop Airplay (Billboard)	17
US Pop Digital Songs (Billboard)	23

== Release history ==
Region	Date	Format(s)	Label	Ref.
Various	August 18, 2017	Digital download	Columbia	
United States	August 28, 2017	Hot adult contemporary radio	Columbia	
