= An Epic No Less =

- Origin: St. Louis, Missouri
- Genres: CCM, Christian rock, worship, pop rock, electronica
- Years active: 2009–present
- Labels: BEC
- Members: Todd Larson; Daniel Chancellor; Hannah Chancellor; Neil Endicott; Brittany Stutz

An Epic No Less (sometimes stylized, An Epic, No Less) is an American Christian music band. They come from St. Louis, Missouri. The band started making music in 2009. Their membership is Todd Larson, Daniel Chancellor, Hannah Chancellor, Neil Endicott, and Brittany Stutz. The band released an independently made album, We Are the Echo of Love, in 2010. They released a studio album, Echo of Love, in 2012, with BEC Recordings.

== Background ==
An Epic No Less is a Christian music band from St. Louis, Missouri. Their members are lead vocalist and pianist, Todd Larson, drummer, Daniel Chancellor, pianist and vocalist, Hannah Chancellor, guitarist, Neil Endicott, and violinist, Brittany Stutz.

== Music history ==
The band commenced as a musical entity in 2009, with their first release, We Are the Echo of Love, an independent album, that was released on June 22, 2010. They released, a studio album, Echo of Love, on August 14, 2012, with BEC Recordings.

== Members ==
Current members

- Todd Larson – vocals, piano
- Daniel Chancellor – drums
- Hannah Chancellor – piano, vocals
- Neil Endicott – guitar
- Brittany Stutz – violin

== Discography ==
Studio albums

- Echo of Love (August 14, 2012, BEC)

Independent albums

- We Are the Echo of Love (June 22, 2010)
