= The Ascendicate =

American band

- Also known as: The 7 Method (1999-2008), TA
- Origin: High Point, North Carolina
- Genres: Christian metal, metalcore
- Years active: 1999-2012 (Indefinite Hiatus)
- Labels: Solid State, MD
- Members: Ryan Helm; Eric Marlow; Dustin Bryant; Chris Wheat; David Dudley
- Past members: Marshall Jones
- Website: The Ascendicate on Facebook

The Ascendicate, originally known as The 7 Method is a Christian metal band from High Point, North Carolina. The band formed in 1999, but went on hiatus in 2012. The band put out tracks of one of their albums, which fell into the hands of Jimmy Ryan and Ryan Clark, and the band signed to Solid State Records. They have shared stages with Staple, Extol, Alien Ant Farm, Disciple, Project 86, and Pillar. Guitarist Ryan Helm joined Demon Hunter, and then formed Damien Deadson.

== Members ==
Current

- Ryan Helm - Lead and Rhythm Guitar, Unclean Vocals
- Eric Marlow - Lead Vocals
- Dustin Bryant - Rhythm and Lead Guitar, Backing Vocals
- Chris Wheat - Drums
- David Dudley - Bass

Former

- Marshall Jones - Bass

== Discography ==
=== As The 7 Method ===
Studio albums

- Roses Like Razorblades (2005; MD)

Independent albums

- The7Method (2000)
- I'll Change Tomorrow (2003)

EPs

- Demo EP (2004)
- The Enlightenment EP (2005)

=== As The Ascendicate ===
Studio albums

- To Die as Kings (2009)
