= Waves (Rachel Platten album) =

Studio album by Rachel Platten
- Released: October 27, 2017
- Recorded: 2017
- Length: 45:21
- Label: Columbia
- Producer: Ryan Tedder; Stargate; Jarrad Rogers; Chantry Johnson; The Wiild; Mitch Allan; Jason Evigan; busbee; Spencer Bastian; Gian Stone; Cameron Jaymes; Jon Levine; Chris Gehringer; Zach Skelton; Ian Kirkpatrick; Jonas Jeberg

Rachel Platten chronology
Wildfire (2016)	Waves (2017)	I Am Rachel Platten (2024)

Singles from Waves
- 1. "Broken Glass" Released: August 18, 2017

Waves is the fourth studio album and second major record label album by American singer and songwriter Rachel Platten. It was released on October 27, 2017.

== Singles ==
The album's lead single, "Broken Glass", was released on August 18, 2017.

== Release and promotion ==
On October 4, 2017, Platten announced Waves via Twitter. "Perfect for You" was released as the album's first promotional single on October 6, 2017. "Collide" was released as the second promotional single on October 20, 2017.

The album was released on October 27, 2017, worldwide, with a standard track edition with 13 songs, released to retailers and digital download and streaming services. A deluxe edition with three extra songs was released exclusively to Target stores in the United States.

== Commercial performance ==
Waves debuted at number 73 on the Billboard 200 with first week sales of 8,000 units which was a significant drop in comparison to her previous album Wildfire which debuted at number 5 with sales of 45,000.

== Track listing ==
Standard edition
No.	Title	Writer(s)	Producer(s)	Length
1.	"Perfect for You"	Rachel Platten; Mike Eyal Aljadeff; Mitch Allan; Nate Cyphert	Chantry Johnson; The Wiild; Allan^{[a]}	3:36
2.	"Whole Heart"	Platten; Jason Evigan; Brett McLaughlin	Evigan; Gian Stone^{[a]}	3:11
3.	"Collide"	Platten; busbee; Lindy Robbins	busbee; Cameron Jaymes; Jason Evigan; Spencer Bastian	3:25
4.	"Keep Up"	Platten; Eyal Aljadeff; Jon Levine	Levine	3:35
5.	"Broken Glass"	Platten; Cyphert; Mikkel Eriksen; Jarrad Rogers	Stargate; Rogers	2:59
6.	"Shivers"	Platten; Evigan; Sean Douglas	Evigan; Chris Gehringer; Stone^{[a]}	2:55
7.	"Loose Ends"	Platten; Evigan; Douglas	Evigan; Stone^{[a]}	3:31
8.	"Labels"	Platten; Zach Skelton; Ryan Tedder	Skelton; Tedder	2:59
9.	"Loveback"	Platten; Cyphert; Ian Kirkpatrick	Kirkpatrick	3:22
10.	"Hands"	Platten; Cyphert; Kirkpatrick	Kirkpatrick; Levine	3:54
11.	"Fooling You"	Platten; Sam Martin; Kirkpatrick	Kirkpatrick	3:49
12.	"Good Life"	Platten; Levine	Levine	3:46
13.	"Grace"	Platten; Cyphert; Evigan; Douglas	Evigan; Stone^{[a]}	4:19
Total length:				45:21

Target and Japanese bonus tracks
No.	Title	Writer(s)	Producer(s)	Length
14.	"Even If It Hurts"	Platten; McLaughlin; Jonas Jeberg	Jeberg	3:11
15.	"Without You"	Platten; Asia Whiteacre; Kid Harpoon	Levine	3:29
16.	"Wild"	Platten; Levine	Levine	3:05
Total length:				55:06

Notes

- ^{^a} signifies a vocal producer

== Charts ==
Chart performance for Waves
Chart (2017)	Peak position
Japanese Albums (Oricon)	142
South Korean Albums Overseas (Gaon)	30
US Billboard 200	73
