= Daytime Emmy Award for Outstanding Musical Performance in a Daytime Program =

Former entertainment award for television

- Awarded for: Outstanding Performance of a Musical Artist and the Program’s production
- Country: United States
- Presented by: NATAS; ATAS
- First award: 2016
- Final award: 2019
- Currently held by: The cast of The Band's Visit, Today Show (2019)
- Website: emmyonline.org/daytime

The Daytime Emmy Award for Outstanding Musical Performance in a Daytime Program was an award presented annually by the National Academy of Television Arts and Sciences (NATAS) and Academy of Television Arts & Sciences (ATAS).

It was first awarded at the 43rd Daytime Creative Arts Emmy Awards in 2016 when the award was originally called Outstanding Musical Performance in a Talk Show/Morning Program and was first presented to Rachel Platten for her performance of her hit single "Fight Song" on the morning program Good Morning America. The Award honors the work of a musical artist and the Program’s production of the performance. With the current title award name that was established in 2017, on-camera musical performances from any appropriate Daytime show and several entries for performances by different musical artists appearing on a program are eligible to enter the competition, rather than just a talk show or morning program.

The award was removed in November 2019 after category changes were announced.

== Winners and nominees ==
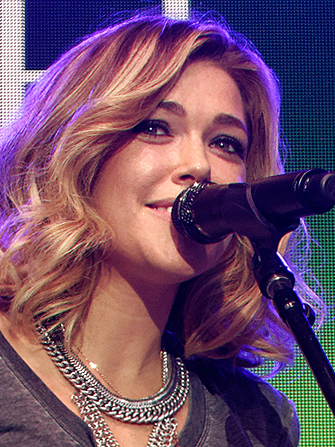
Rachel Platten was the first winner in this category, for her performance of her song "Fight Song" on Good Morning America.

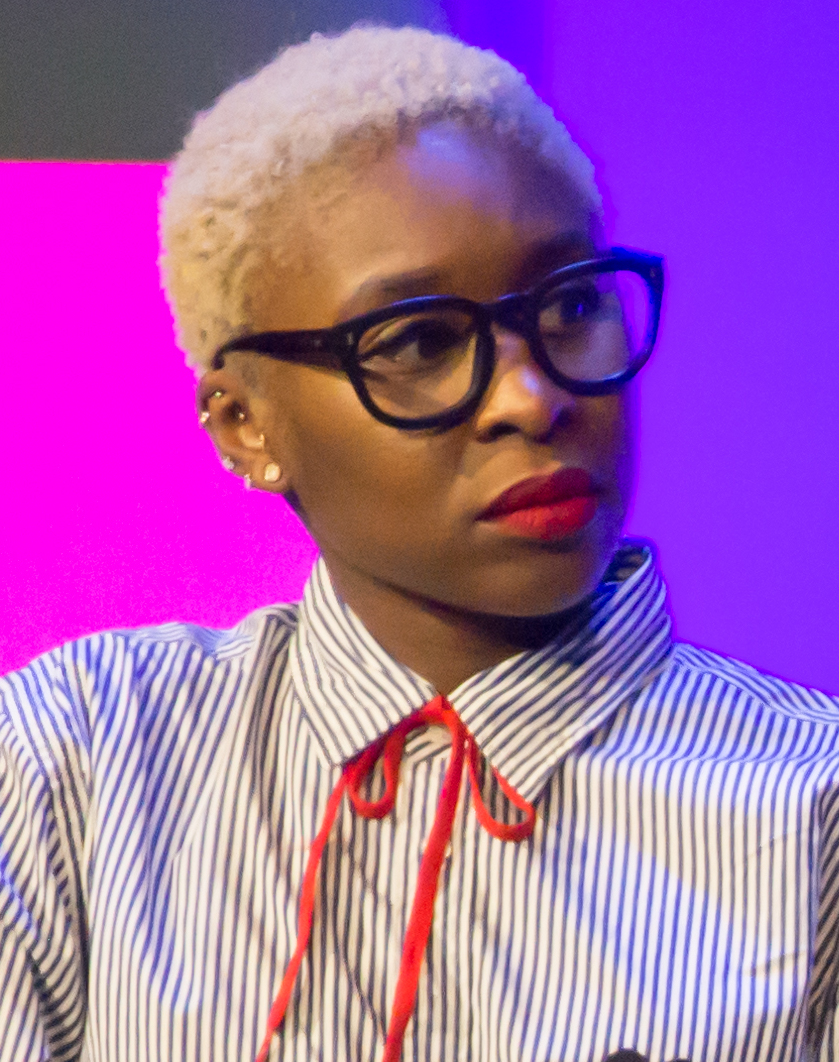
Cynthia Erivo (pictured) alongside of the Broadway cast from The Color Purple won in 2016 for their performance of the titutar song on Today Show.

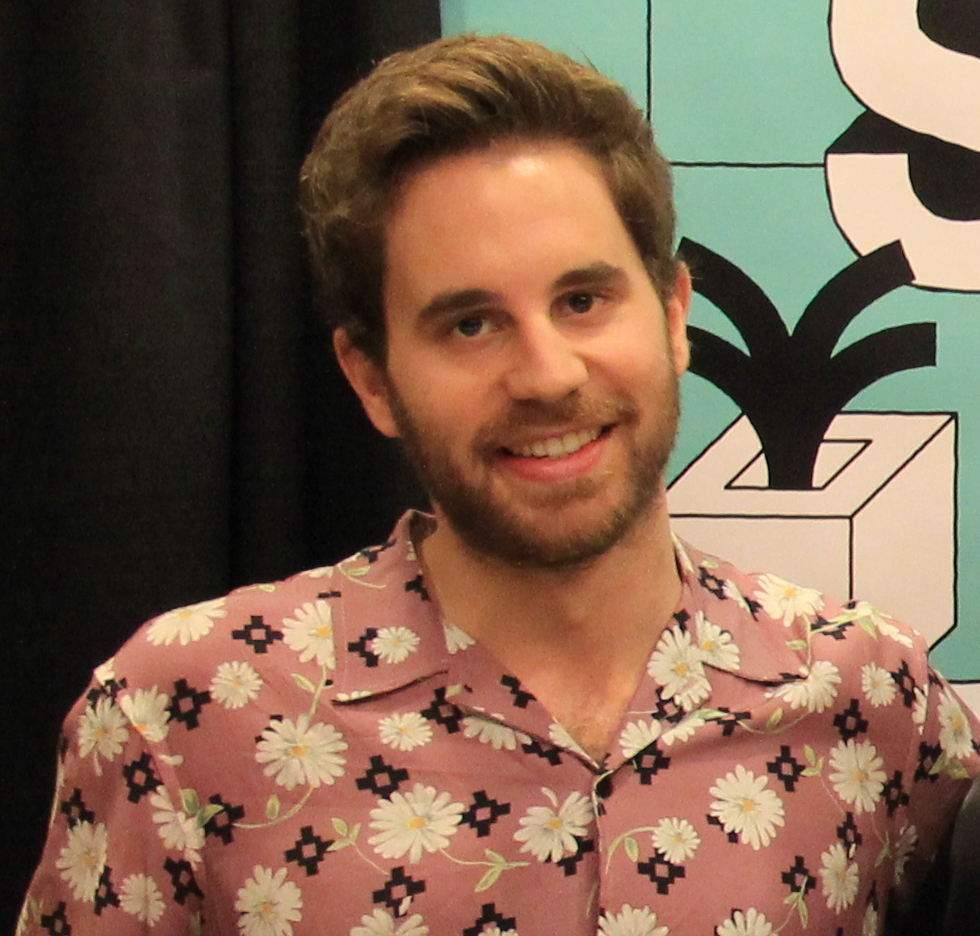
Ben Platt (pictured) alongside of the Broadway cast from Dear Evan Hansen won in 2017 for their performance of "You Will Be Found" on Today Show.

Listed below are the winners of the award for each year, as well as the other nominees.

Table key
‡	Indicates the winner

Year	Performer(s)	Program	Performed	Network	Ref.
2016 (43rd)	Rachel Platten ‡	Good Morning America	"Fight Song"	ABC	
2016 (43rd)	Adele	Today Show	"Million Years Ago"	NBC	
2016 (43rd)	Annie Lennox	The Talk	"I Put a Spell on You"	CBS	
2016 (43rd)	ELO	CBS This Morning Saturday	"When I Was a Boy"	CBS	
2016 (43rd)	Bruno Mars & Mark Ronson	The Ellen DeGeneres Show	"Uptown Funk"	Syndicated	
2017 (44th)
2017 (44th)	Cynthia Erivo & the Cast of The Color Purple	Today Show	"The Color Purple"	NBC	
2017 (44th)	Charles Bradley	CBS This Morning Saturday	"Ain't a Sin" / "The World (Is Going Up In Flames)" / "Changes"	CBS	
2017 (44th)	Michael Bublé	Live! with Kelly	"Nobody but Me"	Syndicated	
2017 (44th)	Pentatonix	Rachael Ray	"God Rest Ye Merry Gentlemen"	Syndicated	
2017 (44th)	St. Paul and The Broken Bones	CBS This Morning Saturday	"All I Ever Wonder" / "Flow With It"	CBS	
2018 (45th)
2018 (45th)	Ben Platt & the Cast of Dear Evan Hansen	Today Show	"You Will Be Found"	NBC	
2018 (45th)	Andra Day and Common	The View	"Rise Up"	ABC	
2018 (45th)	Jason Isbell and The 400 Unit	CBS This Morning Saturday	"Cumberland Gap" / "If We Were Vampires"	CBS	
2018 (45th)	Robert Randolph and the Family Band	Rachael Ray	"Love Do What It Do"	Syndicated	
2018 (45th)	Pharrell Williams	The Ellen DeGeneres Show	"Runnin"	Syndicated	
2019 (46th)	Cast of The Band's Visit	Today Show	"Answer Me"	NBC	
2019 (46th)	Adrienne Houghton, Israel Houghton	The Real	"Secrets"	Syndicated	
2019 (46th)	Lindsey Stirling	Live with Kelly and Ryan	"Dance of the Sugar Plum Fairy"	Syndicated	
2019 (46th)	Ashley McBryde	CBS This Morning Saturday	"Girl Goin' Nowhere / American Scandal"	CBS	
2019 (46th)	Ben Rector	Pickler & Ben	"Old Friends"	CMT	

== Series with most nominations ==
5 nominations

- CBS This Morning Saturday

4 nominations

- Today Show

2 nominations

- The Ellen DeGeneres Show
- Rachael Ray

== Series with most wins ==
3 wins

- Today Show

1 win

- Good Morning America
