= Josh White (Christian musician) =

American Christian musician (born 1973)

- Born: Joshua Alexander White; May 25, 1973 (age 53)
- Genres: Seattle sound, Christian pop
- Occupations: Musician, worship leader, pastor, author
- Instruments: Vocals, guitar
- Years active: 1995–present
- Labels: Bedazzled, Mercury, Emperor, BEC, Deeper Well
- Member of: Telecast
- Formerly of: Marble, Medicate, ManRay
- Website: deeper-well.com/artists/josh-white/

Joshua Alexander White (born May 25, 1973) is an American Christian musician, worship leader, and pastor who primarily plays Christian pop and contemporary worship music. He has released two solo albums, since 2010. He is still the lead singer of the Christian rock band Telecast.

== Early and personal life ==
Joshua Alexander White was born on May 25, 1973. He is the pastor of Door of Hope in Portland, Oregon, where he resides with his wife, Darcy. White was an active singer/songwriter in the Seattle Scene before recording Christian music. He was in the bands Marble, Medicate and Man Ray before going solo in 1999, and then moving to Portland with Darcy and starting Telecast in 2002.

== Music career ==
White started singing and writing music when he was just 12. He was in the band Marble, releasing a self titled album in 1995. He got a big break with his band Man Ray with the album "Casual Thinking" recorded at Avast Studios in Seattle and released on Mercury Records in 1997. The label pushed Hansen instead of ManRay. They played many, many shows all over Seattle and Portland. With a Huge local following, but no real label backing ManRay went on hiatus, and then White had Medicate and played a ton of shows, but did not record, although Avast has unreleased songs by White. After a regrouping, and marrying Darcy, he recorded his first solo album "Coming Undone" released in 1999 on Emperor Records. Moving to Portland he changed direction, went back to his Christian roots and began his Christian band Telecast.

White is still the frontman for the Christian rock band Telecast. Much later in 2010, he released a second solo album, Achor, that was released on November 9, 2010, by BEC Recordings. He released, Absolution, on November 23, 2013, with Deeper Well Records.

== Discography ==
Albums

- Marble – Marble (Bedazzled Records 1995)
- Casual Thinking – ManRay (Mercury Records 1997)
- Coming Undone – Josh White (Emperor Records 1999)
- The Beauty Of Simplicity – Telecast (BEC 2002)
- Eternity Is Now – Telecast (BEC 2005)
- Achor (November 9, 2010, BEC)
- Wounded Healer (November 23, 2013, Deeper Well)
- Absolution (November 23, 2013, Deeper Well)
- Pilgrim (2013, Deeper Well)
- Josh White and Josh Garrels EP (2018)
- What's Done Is Done (2020, Deeper Well/Humble Beast)
- Holy Haunt – EP (2021, Humble Beast, Deeper Well)
