= Echo of Love =

Studio album by An Epic No Less
- Released: August 14, 2012
- Genres: CCM, Christian rock, worship, pop rock, electronica
- Length: 40:49
- Label: BEC
- Producer: Dustin Burnett

Echo of Love is the first studio album by American Christian music band An Epic No Less. BEC Recordings released the album on August 14, 2012. An Epic No Less worked with Dustin Burnett, in the production of this album.

== Critical reception ==
Professional ratings
Review scores
Source	Rating
CCM Magazine	3/5 stars
Christian Music Zine	4.5/5 stars
Cross Rhythms	8/10 squares
HM Magazine	3/5 stars
Indie Vision Music	4/5 stars
Jesus Freak Hideout	3/5 stars 3.5/5 stars
Louder Than the Music	5/5 stars
New Release Today	4/5 stars 3.5/5 stars

Awarding the album three stars from HM Magazine, Doug Van Pelt states, "offers superb production and clarity of sound for listeners." Timothy Estabrooks, giving the album three stars for Jesus Freak Hideout, writes, "An Epic, No Less ventures confidently into this miasma of mediocrity with their major label debut". Rating the album three and a half stars by Jesus Freak Hideout, Tincan Caldwell says, "Echo Of Love is a refreshing, late summer addition to the ranks of new worship music." Mark Sherwood, signaling in an eight out of ten review from Cross Rhythms, writes, "All in all a strong debut." Awarding the album five stars for Louder Than the Music, Jono Davies describes, they "are writing stunning songs that are melodic, catchy and heartfelt."

Mary Nikkel, giving the album four stars at New Release Today, describes, "Echo of Love breathes a refreshing creativity and vibrancy into themes of God's love and His peoples' response." Awarding the album three and a half stars for New Release Today, Kelly Sheads states, "An Epic, No Less isn't your average worship band!" Jonathan Andre, rating the album four stars from Indie Vision Music, writes, "Well done for a revitalising debut work!" Giving the album four and a half stars by Christian Music Zine, Joshua Andre says, "Echo Of Love is sure to melt the hearts of even the most hardened; well done guys on a quality debut, it is worth celebrating, and the message that we are the echo of love is something we all need to hear!"

== Track listing ==
All tracks are written by Dustin Burnett and An Epic No Less on all tracks but they were joined by Bryan Brown on Track No. 4.

Track listing
No.	Title	Length
1.	"We Need You"	4:08
2.	"Caught Up in This Moment"	3:44
3.	"One Word"	4:04
4.	"Mercy Light"	4:00
5.	"We Believe"	3:46
6.	"Echo of Love"	4:29
7.	"Come to the Cross"	4:32
8.	"Rescue Me"	3:44
9.	"Bright White Light"	3:21
10.	"Your Love Is Louder"	5:01
Total length:		40:49
