= Everdown =

American Christian metal band

- Also known as: Dry Bones (1992–1993); Crawlspace (1993–1994)
- Origin: Manchester, New Hampshire, United States
- Genres: Hardcore punk, Christian hardcore, metalcore, Christian metal, Alternative metal, Thrash metal, Crossover thrash
- Years active: 1992–1998, 2009–present
- Labels: A.R.T., Solid State, Tooth & Nail, Urban Achiver
- Members: John Helmig; Erik Adams; John Becht
- Past members: Ryan Leach; Zack Wells; Chris Allain; Bryan Young; Rob Wolfe; Mark Fields; Dave Ball; Chris Wible
- Website: Everdown on Facebook

Everdown is an American Christian metal band, from Manchester, New Hampshire, United States. The band formed in 1992, but disbanded in 1998. The band reunited in 2009, and released two new songs. The band has consisted of drummer Chris Wible, guitarist Nate Shumaker, vocalist Erik Adams, guitarists John Helmig, Dave Ball, and Rob Wolfe (who also did lead vocals for a brief time), bassists John Becht, Ryan Leech, Zach Wells, Chris Allain, Bryan Young, and Mark "Rug" Fields.

== History ==
In 1992, the band formed as Dry Bones, with vocalist Erik Adams, lead guitarist Nate Shumaker and drummer Chris Wible. The band recorded a 7" vinyl EP, titled Dry Bones in 1992 and a demo in 1993, and shortly thereafter changed their name to Crawlspace. However, Adams departed from the band in 1993, briefly being replaced by Sacrament vocalist Rob Wolffe until 1994.

The band recorded their first album, Sicken, at Trauma Studios in Colebrook, P.A with the Kurt Bachman and Joey Daub from the band, Believer, as the producers and engineers.

== Influences ==
The band states their influences were, Sam Black Church, Only Living Witness, Stomp Box, The Crucified, Living Sacrifice, Metallica, & Sick of it All.

== Members ==
Current

- John Helmig – rhythm guitar, backing vocals (1995–1998, 2009–present)
- Erik Adams – vocals (1992–1993, 1994–1998, 2009–present)
- Chris Wible – drums (1992–1998) (Spoken in Tongues)
- John Becht – bass (1995–1998, 2009–present)
- Nate Shumaker – lead guitar (1992–1998)

Former

- Ryan Leach – bass (1995)
- Zack Wells – bass (1995)
- Chris Allain – bass (1992–1993, 1994–1995)
- Bryan Young – bass (1993–1994)
- Rob Wolfe – rhythm guitar, vocals (1993–1994) (ex-Sacrament)
- Mark "Rug" Fields – bass (1998) (ex-Proclamation)
- Dave Ball – rhythm guitar (1994–1995)

Timeline

== Discography ==
As Dry Bones

- Dry Bones (EP; 1992)
- Demo (Demo; 1993)

As Crawlspace

- Shelter (EP; 1994)

As Everdown

- Sicken (Album; 1995)
- Straining (Album; 1996)
- WD40/Black Clover (EP; 2009)
- Coleman/MR. Brown (EP; 2015)

== Bibliography ==
- A. Jenison, David (March 1995). "ever down". Heaven's Metal Magazine. Retrieved on March 16, 2018.
- Pelt, Doug Van (March 1995). "Sicken". Heaven's Metal Magazine. Retrieved on March 16, 2018.
- Hill, Don (1996). "Straining". Cornerstone. Retrieved on March 16, 2018.
- Pelt, Doug Van (February 1996). "Straining". HM Magazine. Retrieved on March 16, 2018.
- "Straining". Garlic Press. Spring 1996. Retrieved on March 16, 2018.
- "Everdown". 7ball. March 1996. Retrieved on March 16, 2018.
- Hershey, Brent (April 1996). "Everdown". HM Magazine. Retrieved on March 16, 2018.
- "Hardnews: Everdown". HM Magazine. July 1997. Retrieved on March 16, 2018.
- Powell, Mark Allan (2002). "Everdown". The Encyclopedia of Contemporary Christian Music. Retrieved on March 16, 2018.
