= What Lies Below (band) =

American metalcore band

- Origin: Harrisburg, Pennsylvania
- Genres: Metalcore; progressive metalcore
- Years active: 2020–present
- Labels: Theoria; Solid State
- Members: Andrew Watson; Mike Watson; Sam Hart; Jonah Luteman
- Website: www.wlbshop.com

What Lies Below is an American metalcore band from Harrisburg, Pennsylvania, formed in 2020. The band currently consists of vocalist Andrew Watson, guitarist Sam Hart, drummer Jonah Luteman and guitarist/vocalist Mike Watson.

The band was formed by brothers Andrew (vocals) and Mike Watson (backing vocals and guitar). They were soon joined by lead guitarist Sam Hart and drummer Jonah Luteman. They released their debut EP Destinations in 2021, performing their first live show the following year in Mechanicsburg, Pennsylvania. They next released the EP Darker Colors in 2023. In 2024, they signed with Theoria Records and released a full album version of the EP titled Darker Colors (Deluxe). Their second album, I Let It Consume Me, was released on July 10, 2026.

== Discography ==
=== Albums ===
- Darker Colors (Deluxe) (2024)
- I Let It Consume Me (2026)

=== EPs ===
- Destinations (2021)
- Darker Colors (2023)
