= Tooth & Nail Records =

American Christian rock record label

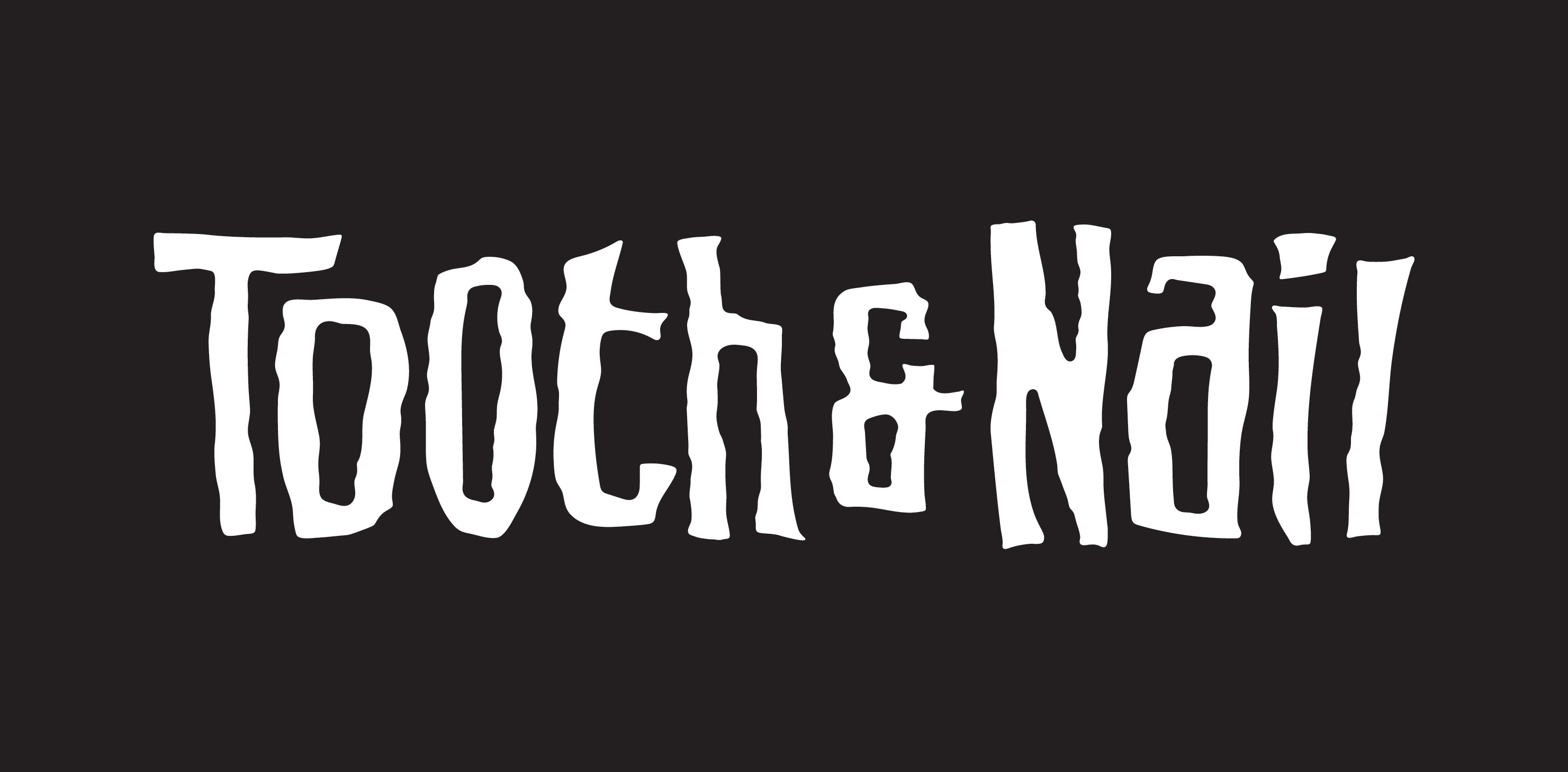
- Founded: 1993
- Founder: Brandon Ebel
- Distributors: US Catalog: Capitol/EMI CMG (1994–2013); RED Music (2013–present); International Catalog: EMI/Universal (1994–2013); Sony Music (2013–present)
- Genre: Christian alternative rock; pop; punk; emo; metal; shoegaze
- Country of origin: United States
- Location: Seattle, Washington
- Official website: toothandnail.com

Tooth & Nail Records is a Christian music record label founded by Brandon Ebel in California in November 1993. The label later moved to Seattle where it is today.

== History ==
Brandon Ebel and Michael Knott conceived the label as a joint venture, before Knott backed out. Prior to forming Tooth & Nail, Ebel worked for Frontline Records.

Tooth & Nail's first album released was Wish for Eden's Pet the Fish. In 2002, the label bought out Takehold Records.

In 2013, Brandon Ebel sold the Tooth & Nail music catalog to Capitol Christian Music Group (formerly EMI Christian Music Group) and bought back the 50% stake in Tooth & Nail formerly owned by EMI, making it an independent record label. It retained rights to all future releases with a new distributor, RED Distribution.

== Overview ==
Eight Tooth & Nail-affiliated albums have been RIAA-certified as gold for sales of 500,000 or more copies. The label had one of its greatest successes when Underoath's Define the Great Line debuted at No. 2 on the Billboard 200 in 2006.

NPR described the label as having "altered the course of the Christian rock industry by launching and legitimizing the careers of MxPx, The O.C. Supertones and Underoath."

== RIAA gold certifications ==
Year	Artist	Album
2004	Jeremy Camp	Carried Me: The Worship Project
2002	Jeremy Camp	Stay
2004	Jeremy Camp	Restored
2006	Jeremy Camp	Beyond Measure
2008	Jeremy Camp	There Will Be a Day
2006	Underoath	Define the Great Line
2004	Underoath	They're Only Chasing Safety
2022	7eventh Time Down	God is on the Move
2005	Kutless	Strong Tower
2006	Kutless	Live from Portland
1998	MxPx	Slowly Going the Way of the Buffalo

== Nominations and awards ==
Year	Artist	Album / Song	Award	Result / Category	Other
2006	Norma Jean	O God, the Aftermath	Grammy	Nominated - Best Recording Package	Solid State Records
2007	Fair	The Best Worst-Case Scenario	Grammy	Nominated - Best Recording Package	
2007	Underoath	"Writing on the Walls"	Grammy	Nominated - Best Short Form Music Video	Solid State Records/Tooth & Nail Records
2008	The Fold	Secrets Keep You Sick	Grammy	Nominated - Best Recording Package	
2009	Hawk Nelson	Hawk Nelson Is My Friend	Grammy	Nominated - Best Recording Package	BEC Recordings/Tooth & Nail Records
2009	Jeremy Camp	Speaking Louder Than Before	Grammy	Nominated - Best Pop/Contemporary Gospel Album	BEC Recordings
2009	Underoath	Lost in the Sound of Separation	Grammy	Nominated - Best Recording Package	Solid State Records

== Structure ==
Solid State Records
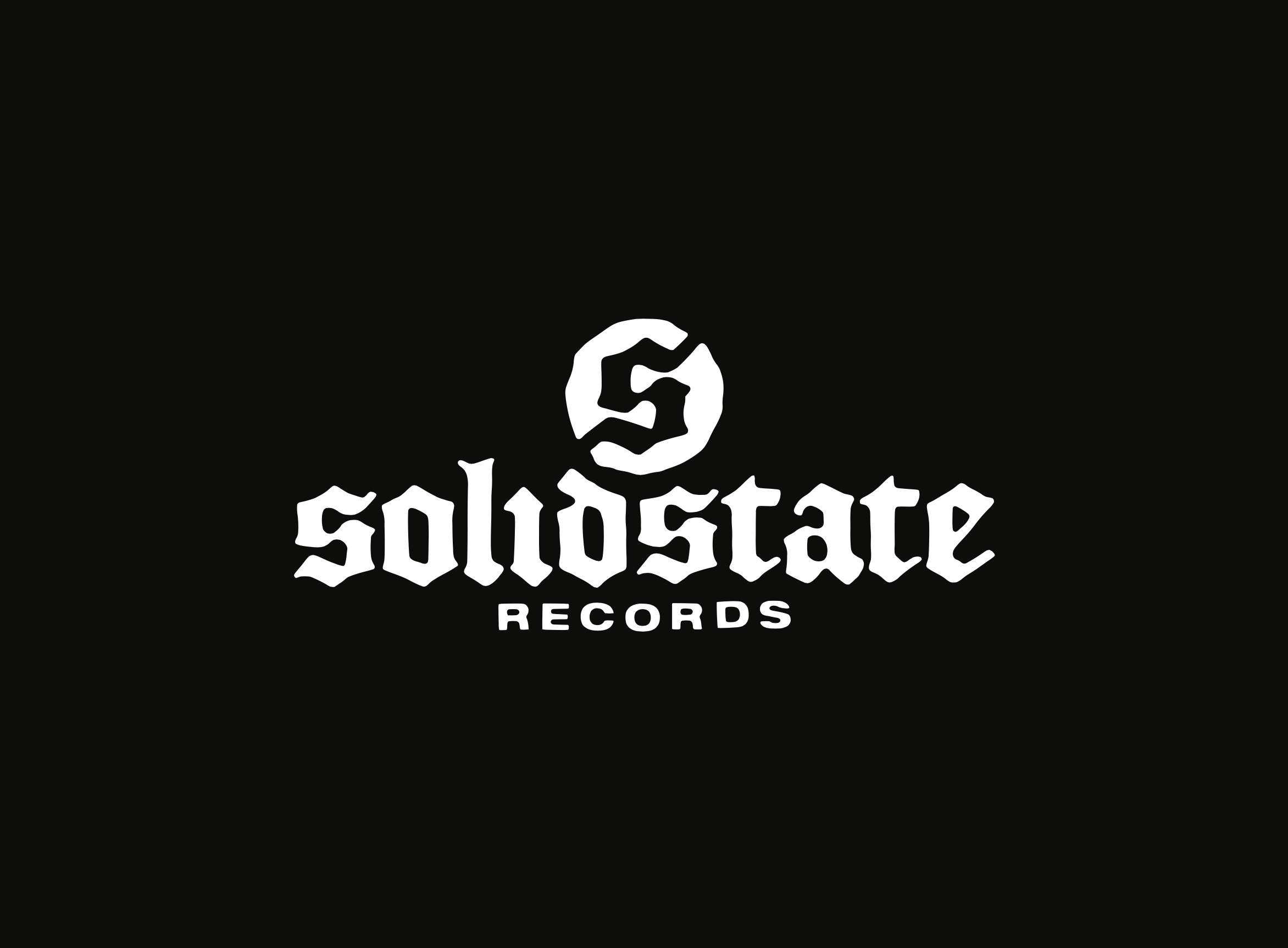
- Parent company: Tooth & Nail Records
- Founded: 1997
- Founder: Brandon Ebel
- Distributors: Capitol Christian Music Group (US; 1993–2013), RED (US; 2013–present), Sony Music (Worldwide)
- Genre: Heavy metal, hardcore punk, metalcore
- Country of origin: United States
- Location: Seattle, Washington
- Official website: solidstaterecords.com

Tooth & Nail has multiple current and former imprints:

- Solid State Records distributes metal and hardcore albums While it is primarily a Christian label, it has signed several bands with Christian members which don't label themselves as Christian bands, including Stretch Arm Strong, Gwen Stacy, He Is Legend, the Famine, Training for Utopia, and the Agony Scene.
- BEC (Brandon Ebel Company) Recordings, a Christian rock record label that was formed in 1997 in partnership with EMI Christian Music Group.
- Plastiq Musiq (founded by Ronnie Martin of Joy Electric) primarily signed electronic music artists. Their collaboration with Tooth & Nail ended in 2001.

== Notable artists ==
=== Tooth & Nail Records ===
Current

- Acres
- Colorblind
- John Van Deusen
- Mike Mains & The Branches
- My Epic
- Slick Shoes
- Tyson Motsenbocker
- Valleyheart

Former

- Abandoned Pools
- Acceptance
- Ace Troubleshooter
- The Almost
- Anberlin
- Anchor & Braille
- And Then There Were None
- AP2
- Artifex Pereo
- As Cities Burn
- The Blamed
- Bleach
- Blenderhead
- Blessed by a Broken Heart
- Blindside
- Bloodshed
- Bon Voyage
- Born Blind
- Brave Saint Saturn
- The Brothers Martin
- Capital Lights
- CHATTERbOX
- Children 18:3
- The Classic Crime
- Copeland
- Craig's Brother
- Crash Rickshaw
- The Crucified
- Damien Jurado
- Danielson
- Dead Poetic
- The Deadlines
- Death Therapy
- The Deluxtone Rockets
- The Dingees
- Disciple
- Discover America
- Dogwood
- A Dream Too Late
- Emery
- Everdown
- Falling Up
- Family Force 5
- Far-Less
- Fighting Jacks
- Fine China
- FM Static
- Focal Point
- Focused
- The Fold
- For Love Not Lisa
- Frodus
- Further Seems Forever
- Ghoti Hook
- Aaron Gillespie
- Halo Friendlies
- Hangnail
- Havalina
- Hawk Nelson
- Hearts Like Lions
- Holland
- Hyland
- The Huntingtons
- I Am Empire
- Icon for Hire
- Ivoryline
- Jonezetta
- Joy Electric
- The Juliana Theory
- Kings Kaleidoscope
- Klank
- The Letter Black
- The Lonely Hearts
- Love & Death
- Lucerin Blue
- Luxury
- Mae
- Mantric
- Matt & Toby
- mewithoutYou
- Mike Knott
- Morella's Forest
- Mortal
- MxPx
- Neon Horse
- New Empire
- Nine Lashes
- Ninety Pound Wuss
- Number One Gun
- The O.C. Supertones
- Overcome
- Pedro the Lion (David Bazan)
- Plankeye
- P.O.D.
- Poor Old Lu
- Project 86
- Puller
- Queens Club
- Roadside Monument
- Rocky Loves Emily
- Run Kid Run
- Ruth
- Sainthood Reps
- Search the City
- Secret and Whisper
- The Send
- Sent by Ravens
- Seventh Day Slumber
- Showbread
- Side Walk Slam
- Since October
- Spoken
- Aaron Sprinkle
- Squad Five-O
- Starflyer 59
- Stavesacre
- Strongarm
- Swimming with Dolphins
- Sullivan
- Terminal
- Thousand Foot Krutch
- Twothirtyeight
- We Are the City
- The Welcome Wagon
- Unashamed
- The Undecided
- Underoath
- Value Pac
- Velour 100
- Waking Ashland
- Watashi Wa
- The Wedding
- Write This Down
- XXI

=== BEC Recordings ===
Current

- 7eventh Time Down
- Ashes Remain
- Cory Asbury
- Disciple
- Jordan St. Cyr
- Kings Kaleidoscope
- Kutless
- Lion of Judah
- Rhett Walker
- Tasha Layton
- The Young Escape

Former

- Ace Troubleshooter
- Adam Cappa
- Adie
- All Things New
- Among the Thirsty
- An Epic No Less
- Jessa Anderson
- Bon Voyage
- Freddie Bruno
- Cadet
- Jeremy Camp
- Citizens
- The Cross Movement
- David Dunn
- Deepspace5
- The Dingees
- The Echoing Green
- Everman
- Falling Up
- Fearless BND
- Flight 180
- Fold Zandura
- Ghost Ship
- Aaron Gillespie
- The Glorious Unseen
- Hangnail
- Hawk Nelson
- iLL Harmonics
- KJ-52
- Dustin Kensrue
- Joy Electric
- The O.C. Supertones
- Phillip LaRue
- Jadon Lavik
- Lost Dogs
- LPG
- Mainstay
- Manafest
- Andrew Marcus
- Mars Ill
- Sarah Masen
- Matty Mullins
- The Museum
- New Breed
- Nine Lashes
- Bebo Norman
- Peace 586
- Peace of Mind
- Pivitplex
- Plankeye
- Project 86
- Propaganda
- Rapture Ruckus
- Jaymes Reunion
- .rod laver
- Ryan Stevenson
- Seven Places
- Sev Statik
- Seventh Day Slumber (active, currently with Rockfest Records)
- ShineBright
- Shuree
- Smalltown Poets
- Ryan Stevenson
- Jon Micah Sumrall
- Sup the Chemist
- Chris Taylor
- Telecast
- Tunnel Rats
- Ultrabeat
- Value Pac
- Adam Watts
- Josh White
- Sherri Youngward

=== Solid State Records ===
Current

- Becoming the Archetype
- The Devil Wears Prada
- Extol
- Fit for a King
- Haste the Day
- Miss May I
- Norma Jean
- Oh, Sleeper
- The Ongoing Concept
- Phinehas
- What Lies Below
- Wolves at the Gate

Former

==== Active former artists ====
- Advent
- The Agony Scene
- As Cities Burn
- As They Sleep
- August Burns Red
- Azusa
- Beloved
- Blindside
- Death Therapy
- Demon Hunter
- Destroy the Runner
- Emery
- Few Left Standing
- Forevermore
- He Is Legend
- Life in Your Way
- Living Sacrifice
- Mantric
- MyChildren MyBride
- My Heart to Fear
- Once Nothing
- Showbread
- Silent Planet
- Soul Embraced
- Stretch Arm Strong
- Trenches
- Underoath
- Zao

==== Disbanded ====
- 3rd Root
- Bloodshed (members went on to join The O.C. Supertones and Project 86)
- Born Blind (members also in No Innocent Victim)
- The Chariot (members in '68 and I Am Terrified)
- Cry of the Afflicted
- The Death Campaign (members also in Officer Negative)
- Embodyment (members went on to form The Famine)
- Eso-Charis (vocalist Cory Brandan Putman now fronts Norma Jean, bassist Arthur Green and drummer Matthew Putman went on to join Living Sacrifice)
- The Famine (members also in Embodyment and Society's Finest)
- Focal Point (guitarist Ryan Clark went on to join Training for Utopia and is now in Demon Hunter)
- Gwen Stacy (members also in Once Nothing)
- Inhale Exhale (members also in Narcissus and Relient K)
- Luti-Kriss (went on to form Norma Jean)
- Officer Negative (members also formed The Death Campaign)
- Overcome (members in Some Dark Hallow and Sanhedrin)
- Selfmindead (members now in Benea Reach)
- Sever Your Ties
- Still Breathing
- Strongarm (members went on to form Further Seems Forever)
- Training for Utopia (members went on to form Demon Hunter)
- Twelve Gauge Valentine (members went on to join, Alesana, Swamp Basstard, and The Greenery)
- Warlord (members went on to Pilgrims and Roadside Monument)

==== On hiatus or inactive ====
- The Ascendicate (guitarist Ryan Helm went on to Demon Hunter, and start Damien Deadson)
- Dead Poetic (drummer Jesse Sprinkle currently working solo)
- Everdown (Urban Achiever Records)
- Figure Four (two members are currently with Comeback Kid)
- Lengsel (members now in Mantric)
- No Innocent Victim (members working for Facedown Records)
- Society's Finest
- Spitfire (Goodfellow Records; two members in Sunndrug)
- The Overseer (members in Project 86 and Wolves at the Gate)
- The Showdown (three members in Demon Hunter, one member in Still Remains)
- To Speak of Wolves (one member in Oh Sleeper)

== See also ==
- Tooth & Nail Records discography
- List of record labels
