= Telecast (band) =

American Christian worship band

- Origin: Spokane, Washington
- Genre: Christian rock
- Label: BEC
- Members: Josh White; Bobby Love; Luke Stillar; Brook Mosser; Zach Hodges; John Mark Comer; Ashley Elder
- Past members: Marquis Ashley; Adam Breeden; Brian Ortize; Nick Tibbetts; Joe McQueen

Telecast is an American Christian worship band. The band began in Spokane, Washington, with songwriter Josh White, guitarist Brian Ortize, Marquis Ashley and Nick Tibbetts. Telecast released its debut album, The Beauty of Simplicity, on BEC Records in 2003, and followed it with Eternity is Now on the same label in 2005. In 2008 they released their third album, Quiet Revolution.

== Band members ==
=== Original line-up ===
The band members that recorded The Beauty of Simplicity were Josh White (vocals, acoustic guitar), Marquis Ashley (bass guitar), Adam Breeden (guitar), Zach Hodges (keyboard), Brian Ortize (guitar, vocals), and Nick Tibbetts (drums).

Brian Ortize has served in worship ministry for 20 years. He launched an academic training program called "the worship school" which he founded in 2013 and is also a recording artist in Nashville, TN. He released his debut album on BEC Recordings in 2017.

Marquis Ashley has served in Worship & Pastoral Ministry since 2003 and is currently the Worship Pastor at Veneration Church in Kalispell, MT which he co-planted in 2020.

=== Josh White ===
Lead singer Josh White recorded a solo project on BEC Records, Achor, which was released in November 2010.

White also recorded several albums on the Deeper Well Gospel Collective label. These include albums with The Followers, Pilgrim, and as a solo artist. One of these was The Followers self-titled album, released in 2009, featuring White with former members of Rock and Roll Worship Circus, Ruth, Esterlyn, and Starfield. In November 2013, White released another solo album named Absolution, "a reworking of Telecast songs", on the label Deeper Well Gospel Collective.

White founded a church in Portland, Oregon, called Door of Hope. He was previously a teaching pastor and lead worship pastor at Bridgetown Church in Portland. He is married to Darcy White, and they have two children, Henry and Hattie Star.

== Discography ==
- The Beauty of Simplicity (2003)
- Eternity Is Now (2005)
- Quiet Revolution (2008) U.S. Christian No. 49
