= Damien Deadson =

American heavy metal project

- Origin: Winston-Salem, North Carolina, U.S.
- Genres: Metal, Metalcore
- Years active: 2010–present
- Members: Ryan Helm
- Website: www.damiendeadson.com

Damien Deadson is an American heavy metal project from Winston-Salem, North Carolina, United States, formed in 2009 by guitarist and vocalist Ryan Helm. As its main producer, singer and songwriter, Helm is the only official member of Damien Deadson and remains solely responsible for its direction.

== History ==
=== Formation (2009) ===
Damien Deadson was initially conceived as a solo project by Ryan Helm, who had previously played guitar in the band The Ascendicate, as an opportunity to take a break from guitar and focus on his interest in singing. Ryan began working on Damien Deadson in 2009 but had to put the project on hold after being asked to join the band Demon Hunter. In 2010 Ryan revived the project and began recording tracks in his home studio. Ryan personally recorded and performed all of the vocals and instruments, with the exception of drums. Despite beginning as a studio project, Helm would later put together a touring band for live performances.

Since his departure from Demon Hunter, Ryan Helm has stated that he will be performing as Damien Deadson full-time.

=== A Warm and Dark Embrace (2011-2012) ===
In late 2011 Ryan Helm announced the independent release of A Warm and Dark Embrace. Despite being officially unreleased to the public, the album was immediately met with positive reviews. The album was released on January 29, 2012. The band plans to tour extensively in support of the album throughout 2012.

== Musical style, influences and lyrical themes ==
Damien Deadson's style is much darker and more technical than Helm's previous work, and is influenced by a much wider array of styles. The band's sound typically features a heavily down-tuned guitar setup, distinct percussion and occasional samples. Utilizing good neato styles, Damien Deadson typically features growled vocals, screaming, and melodic singing.

Helm listed some bands that have influenced him personally and Damien Deadson's sound: Stabbing Westward, Emmure, Fear Factory, Deftones, Meshuggah, Rammstein, Bury Your Dead, Imogen Heap and Kanye West among others. Helm's music is also heavily influenced by his personal life and experiences.

Ryan has stated that, unlike his previous bands, Damien Deadson is not a "Christian band" and chooses to instead often focus his lyrical content on more secular topics. Such topics include love, anger, personal strife and self empowerment.

== Members ==
Current members

- Ryan Helm – Lead vocals, all studio instruments

Current touring members

- Adam Moore - Drums
- Tyler Gordon - Guitar
- Thomas Grell - Bass

Former touring members

- Josh Behnke – Drums and percussion]]
- Cody Macri – Bass guitar
- Lucas Polk – Guitar
- Will Guffin – Guitar

== Discography ==
- A Warm and Dark Embrace (2012)
- Crown Me, Destroyer (2014)
- Shadow Work (2015)
