= Jaymes Reunion =

American Christian music band

- Origin: Bakersfield, California
- Genres: Christian rock; Christian pop; Christian alternative rock; rock; pop; alternative rock; pop rock
- Years active: 2004–present
- Label: BEC
- Members: Cameron Jaymes; Braydon Nelson; Eric Watson; Jeremy Taylor; Nick Clupny
- Past members: Jared Byers
- Website: facebook.com/jaymesreunion

Jaymes Reunion are an American Christian music band from Bakersfield, California, and they started making music together in 2004. They have released two extended plays, The Fine (2008) and Jaymes Reunion (2009), and one studio album, Everything You've Been Looking For (2010), all with BEC Recordings.

== Background ==
The band are from Bakersfield, California, where they started making music together in 2004. Their members are vocalist, guitarist, and pianist, Cameron Jaymes, lead guitarist, Braydon Nelson, bassist, Eric Watson, and percussionist, Jeremy Taylor and Jared Byers, while Byers has left the band, being replaced by Nick Clupny.

== Music history ==
Their first extended play, The Fine, was released on July 8, 2008, from BEC Recordings. The subsequent extended play, Jaymes Reunion, was released on September 22, 2009, by BEC Recordings. They released, Everything You've Been Looking For, a studio album, on April 20, 2010, with BEC Recordings.

== Members ==
Current members

- Cameron Jaymes (born Cameron James Brier) – vocals, guitar, piano
- Braydon Nelson – guitar
- Eric Watson – bass
- Jeremy Taylor – percussion
- Nick Clupny

Past members

- Jared Byers – percussion

== Discography ==
Studio albums

- Everything You've Been Looking For (April 20, 2010, BEC)

EPs

- The Fine (July 8, 2008, BEC)
- Jaymes Reunion (September 22, 2009, BEC)
