= Fight Song (Rachel Platten song) =

2015 single by Rachel Platten

Single by Rachel Platten

from the album Wildfire and the EP Fight Song
- B-side: "Lone Ranger"
- Released: February 19, 2015
- Recorded: 2014
- Studio: The Synagogue (Los Angeles, CA); The Village Recorder (Los Angeles, CA); EastWest Studios (Los Angeles, CA)
- Genre: Pop rock
- Length: 3:24
- Label: Columbia
- Songwriters: Rachel Platten; Dave Bassett
- Producer: Jon Levine

Rachel Platten singles chronology
| "1,000 Ships" (2011) | "Fight Song" (2015) | "Stand by You" (2015) |

Music video
- "Fight Song" on YouTube

"Fight Song" is a song by American singer-songwriter Rachel Platten, released on February 19, 2015, through Columbia Records. The song was included on Platten's debut extended play (EP) of the same name (2015), and her third studio album, Wildfire (2015). The pop rock song was written by Platten and Dave Bassett, and produced by Jon Levine. Platten, at the time a struggling musician, was inspired to write the song to promote self-empowerment.

Music critics praised the song's message and Platten's vocal performance. The song was nominated for and won awards, including a Daytime Emmy Award for Outstanding Musical Performance in a Daytime Program. In the United States, the song reached number six on the Billboard Hot 100 and was certified Diamond by the Recording Industry Association of America. It also reached the top 10 in Australia, Canada, Ireland, Japan, New Zealand, and the United Kingdom, attaining gold and multi-platinum certifications in all except Ireland and Japan.

James Lees directed the music video for "Fight Song", which features Platten wandering around a city and performing at a bar. In further promotion, Platten performed the song at award shows, sporting events, and as guest on Taylor Swift's 1989 World Tour. Media usage has included placement in popular films, television shows, and commercials. It was adopted as a campaign song by Hillary Clinton for her 2016 U.S. presidential campaign.

On August 25, 2025, Platten announced Fight Song (Rachel's Version), a new album including re-recorded versions of "Fight Song", "Stand by You" and other songs from Wildfire. Fight Song (Rachel's Version) was released on September 26, 2025.

== Composition ==
In the version published at Musicnotes.com by Platten Music Publishing, the sheet music is in the key of G major with a moderate tempo of 88 beats per minute. The song follows a chord progression of G – D – Em – C, and Platten's vocals span from G_{3.} to E_{5}. Musically, "Fight Song" is a pop rock song backed by a piano. "Fight Song" starts off with a simple melody played on the piano, as Platten starts to sing the first stanza and pre-chorus which introduces a drum and horns that play throughout. The song ends with an acoustic guitar, as Platten sings the outro. It has a duration of three minutes and twenty-two seconds.

== Critical reception ==
"Fight Song" has received positive reviews from critics, who agree that the song's positive message and Platten's vocals were the song's strongest features. A review by Markos Papatados from the Digital Journal stated "The lyrics for 'Fight Song' are captivating and they tug at the heartstrings. It is a track from her Fight Song EP, which was released on May 15. Platten's vocals are crisp and impressive, where the listener can recall such songstresses as Taylor Swift and Tristan Prettyman. Her lyrics are powerful and they paint a vivid picture in the minds of her listeners."

== Commercial performance ==
The song first charted in Australia, debuting at 35 on the ARIA Charts on April 12, 2015. The song eventually peaked at number 2 in Australia on July 12, 2015. It later reached number 8 in New Zealand after first being covered as a charity single by The X Factor top 12.

The song debuted on the Billboard Hot 100 chart of May 2, 2015 at number 80, becoming Platten's first entry on the chart. On July 18, 2015, the song entered the top 10 at number 10, becoming her first top 10. On August 19, 2015, the song eventually peaked at number 6. It has also reached Diamond status in the US, selling over ten million copies in Platten's home country. "Fight Song" also peaked at number one on the Billboard Adult Top 40 chart for 4 weeks, number one on the Billboard Adult Contemporary chart for 4 weeks, number 3 on the Billboard Digital Songs chart, number 1 on the Billboard Radio Songs chart, and number 8 on the Pop Songs chart. Elsewhere, it peaked at number 5 on the Billboard Canadian Hot 100.

In the United Kingdom, the song jumped from number sixty eight to the top of the UK Singles Chart on August 28, 2015 – for the week ending date September 3, 2015 – becoming Platten's first chart-topping song, and overall top ten hit, in Britain. In the Republic of Ireland, the song peaked at number six on the Irish Singles Chart. On April 25, 2016, this song peaked at number nine on the Billboard Japan Hot 100 chart.

On October 31, 2024, The Boston Globe reported that, based on data from Audacy, radio stations 106.7 and 104.1 are playing "Fight Song" nearly 500 times a week despite the song being released nine years ago.

== Music video ==
An accompanying music video directed by James Lees was released on May 19, 2015. The shooting lasted four days. Platten said of the concept: "I wanted my video to show both sides of that – my fear and pain – but I also hoped to show that sometimes to overcome battles we just have to let go."

== Live performances ==
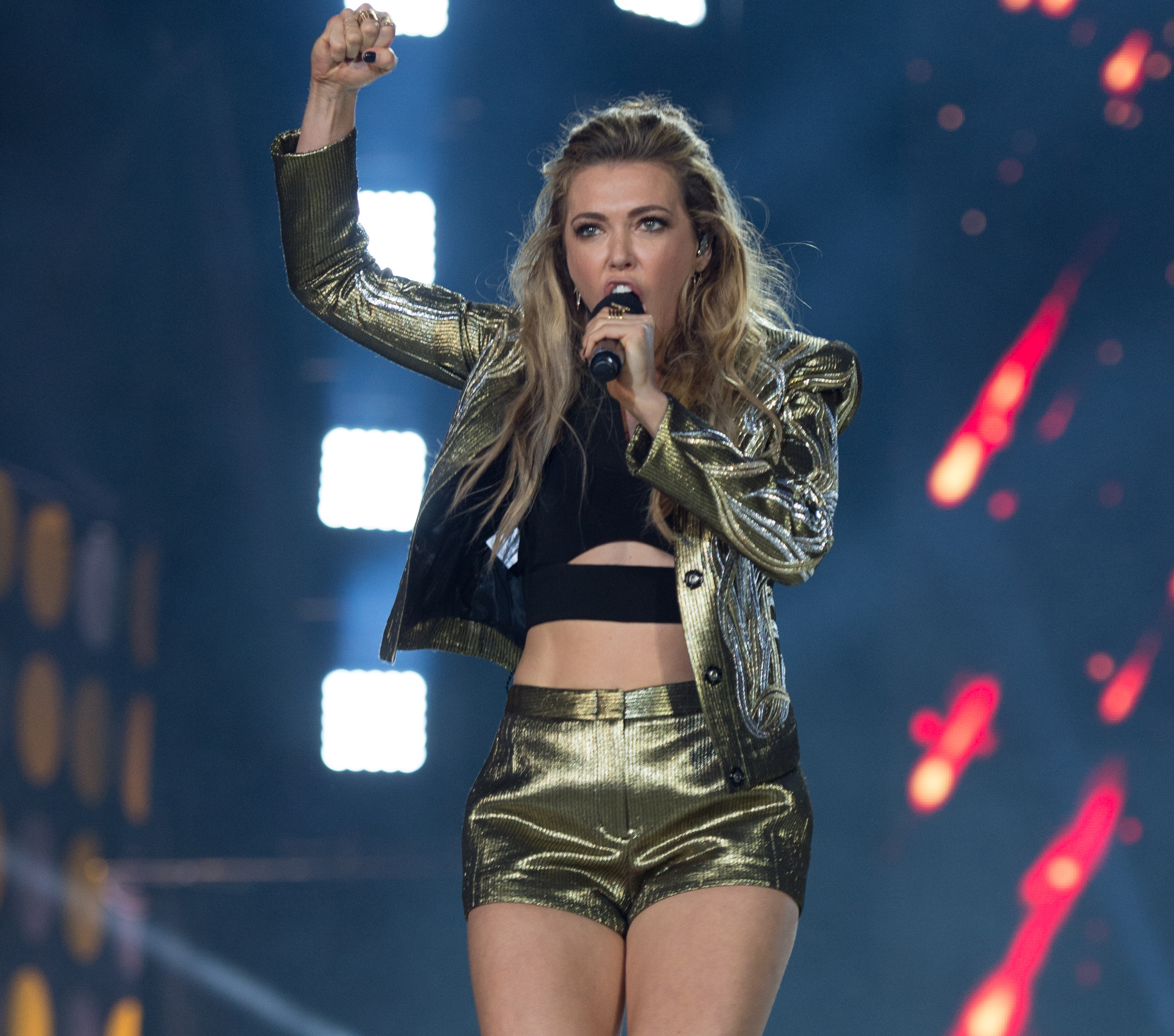
Platten performing "Fight Song" at the closing ceremony of the 2016 Invictus Games

On April 25, 2015, Platten performed the song for the first time at the 2015 Radio Disney Music Awards. Platten appeared as a special guest during Taylor Swift's 1989 World Tour in Philadelphia on June 13, 2015, where Platten and Swift performed "Fight Song" together. On August 16, 2015, Platten performed the song at the 2015 Teen Choice Awards in Los Angeles. On July 12, 2016, Platten performed "Fight Song" at the 2016 Major League Baseball All-Star Game at Petco Park in San Diego, where baseball fans and players held up cards with the names of people they knew were battling cancer to dedicate the performance to them. On New Year's Eve 2016−17, Platten sang the song as part of her lineup during the Times Square Ball festivities in New York City's Times Square, which she co-headlined. On January 13, 2025, Platten performed the song prior to a televised NFC Wild Card game between the Los Angeles Rams and the Minnesota Vikings. The song was performed as a tribute to the citizens of Los Angeles as they dealt with the wildfires that ravaged the area just a week prior.

== Political use ==
The song was adopted as a campaign song for Hillary Clinton's 2016 U.S. presidential campaign. In February 2016, the campaign began to use the song in conjunction with the slogan "Fighting for Us". It was frequently used at rallies and speeches, with some media commentators labeling the song as synonymous with Clinton's eventual loss in the election. An a capella version of "Fight Song" was performed by a group of celebrities—including Platten—at the 2016 Democratic National Convention, and it was played following Clinton's speech at the 2024 Democratic National Convention. Speaking on the song's use by the Clinton campaign, Platten stated: "I'm proud of how it's been used. I don't have any regrets about it." On 7 February 2026 the White House posted a video using "Fight Song" as the background music on YouTube. During the 2026 midterm elections the White House account on X posted a tweet reading "OUR FIGHT SONG. NEVER FORGET." containing the same video.

== Usage in media ==
- "Fight Song" was named the official theme song for the 2015 "Rise Above Cancer" campaign that appeared on most WWE shows throughout the month of October as part of the company's partnership with Susan G. Komen.
- The song was used in the thirteenth episode of Pretty Little Liars's fifth season "How the 'A' Stole Christmas".
- The song has been used in a series of Ford TV commercials for their line of SUV's, namely, the 2015 Ford Edge and 2016 Ford Explorer.
- "Fight Song" was named the official theme song of the 2016 IIHF World Women's U18 Championship held in St. Catharines, Ontario, Canada. Each game was opened with images of the participating countries as well as flag bearers who represented each country at centre ice as the song played.
- Calysta Bevier sang "Fight Song" during her audition for the eleventh season of America's Got Talent in 2016. Bevier also sang the same song at a high school talent show, which went on to become a viral video, landing her on The Ellen DeGeneres Show singing the same song with Rachel Platten.
- Platten performed the song live at State Farm Stadium before the Monday Night Football game between the Minnesota Vikings and the Los Angeles Rams on January 13, 2025, in response to the California wildfires. During the performance, she altered the lyrics "I might only have one match, but I can make an explosion" to "We might’ve been knocked down, but I know we’ll keep going," likely to avoid imagery associated with the wildfires.
- The song was used in the fourth episode of The Simpsons thirty-fifth season "Thirst Trap: A Corporate Love Story".

== Track listing ==
Digital download – single

1. "Fight Song" – 3:22
2. "Lone Ranger" – 3:07

Other versions

- Dave Audé Remix
- Dave Audé Radio Edit
- DJ Mike D Remix
- DJ Mike D Radio Mix

== Charts ==
=== Weekly charts ===
Weekly chart performance for "Fight Song"
| Chart (2015–2016) | Peak position |
|---|---|
| Australia (ARIA) | 2 |
| Austria (Ö3 Austria Top 40) | 13 |
| Belgium (Ultratop 50 Flanders) | 26 |
| Belgium (Ultratip Bubbling Under Wallonia) | 6 |
| Canada Hot 100 (Billboard) | 5 |
| Canada AC (Billboard) | 1 |
| Canada CHR/Top 40 (Billboard) | 17 |
| Canada Hot AC (Billboard) | 3 |
| Czech Republic Airplay (ČNS IFPI) | 20 |
| Czech Republic Singles Digital (ČNS IFPI) | 19 |
| Euro Digital Song Sales (Billboard) | 4 |
| France (SNEP) | 89 |
| Germany (GfK) | 76 |
| Ireland (IRMA) | 6 |
| Italy (FIMI) | 100 |
| Japan Hot 100 | 9 |
| Japan Hot Overseas (Billboard) | 1 |
| Netherlands (Single Top 100) | 75 |
| New Zealand (Recorded Music NZ) | 8 |
| Poland Airplay (ZPAV) | 10 |
| Poland (Polish Airplay New) | 1 |
| Scottish Singles Sales (Official Charts) | 1 |
| Slovakia Airplay (ČNS IFPI) | 15 |
| Slovakia Singles Digital (ČNS IFPI) | 35 |
| Slovenia (SloTop50) | 31 |
| Spain (Promusicae) | 36 |
| Sweden (Sverigetopplistan) | 56 |
| Switzerland (Schweizer Hitparade) | 38 |
| UK Singles (Official Charts) | 1 |
| US Billboard Hot 100 | 6 |
| US Adult Contemporary (Billboard) | 1 |
| US Adult Pop Airplay (Billboard) | 1 |
| US Pop Airplay (Billboard) | 8 |

| Chart (2025) | Peak position |
|---|---|
| Japan Download Songs (Billboard Japan) | 16 |
| Japan Digital Singles (Oricon) | 17 |

=== Year-end charts ===
Annual chart rankings for "Fight Song"
| Chart (2015) | Position |
|---|---|
| Australia (ARIA) | 21 |
| Canada (Canadian Hot 100) | 23 |
| New Zealand (Recorded Music NZ) | 42 |
| UK Singles (Official Charts Company) | 65 |
| US Billboard Hot 100 | 20 |
| US Adult Contemporary (Billboard) | 9 |
| US Adult Top 40 (Billboard) | 2 |
| US Mainstream Top 40 (Billboard) | 40 |

| Chart (2016) | Position |
|---|---|
| US Adult Contemporary (Billboard) | 14 |

== Certifications ==
| Region | Certification | Certified units/sales |
|---|---|---|
| Australia (ARIA) | 5× Platinum | 350,000^{‡} |
| Canada (Music Canada) | 3× Platinum | 240,000^{*} |
| Denmark (IFPI Danmark) | Platinum | 90,000^{‡} |
| Germany (BVMI) | Gold | 200,000^{‡} |
| Italy (FIMI) | Gold | 25,000^{‡} |
| Mexico (AMPROFON) | Platinum | 60,000^{‡} |
| New Zealand (RMNZ) | 4× Platinum | 120,000^{‡} |
| Norway (IFPI Norway) | Gold | 20,000^{‡} |
| Poland (ZPAV) | 2× Platinum | 40,000^{‡} |
| Spain (Promusicae) | Gold | 30,000^{‡} |
| Sweden (GLF) | Gold | 20,000^{‡} |
| United Kingdom (BPI) | 3× Platinum | 1,800,000^{‡} |
| United States (RIAA) | Diamond | 10,000,000^{‡} |
Streaming
| Japan (RIAJ) | Gold | 50,000,000^{†} |
^{*} Sales figures based on certification alone.^{‡} Sales+streaming figures based on certification alone.^{†} Streaming-only figures based on certification alone.

== See also ==
- List of Billboard Adult Contemporary number ones of 2015
