= Rachel Platten =

American singer-songwriter (born 1981)

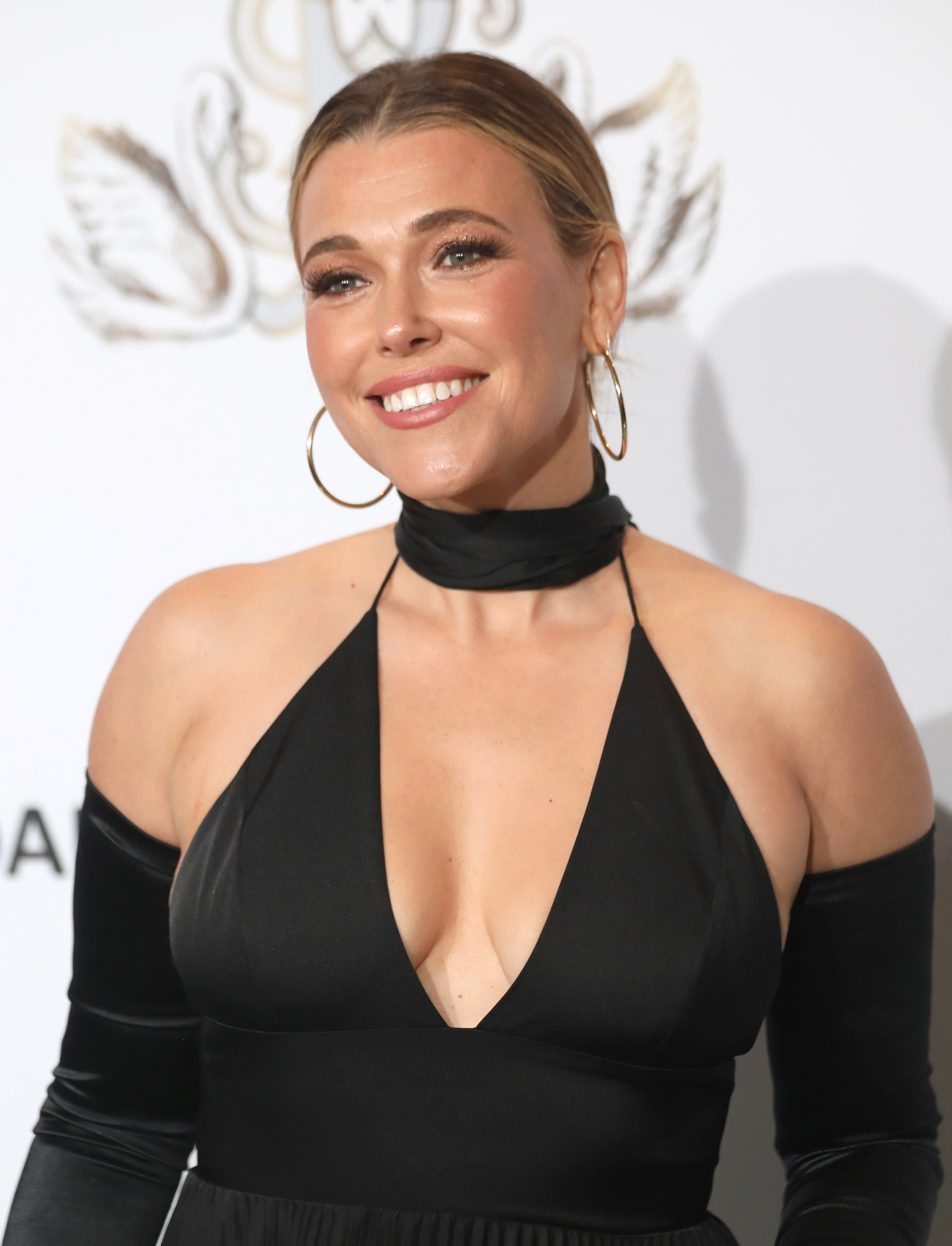
- Platten in 2023
- Born: Rachel Ashley Platten; May 20, 1981 (age 45); New York City, New York, U.S.
- Education: Trinity College (BA)
- Occupations: Singer; songwriter; author
- Years active: 2002-present
- Spouse: Kevin Lazan (m. 2010)
- Children: 2
- Musical career
- Genres: Pop; indie pop
- Instruments: Vocals; piano; keyboards; guitar
- Labels: Rock Ridge; Columbia; RCA
- Website: RachelPlatten.com

Rachel Ashley Platten (born May 20, 1981) is an American singer-songwriter and author. After releasing two albums independently in 2003 and 2011, she signed with Columbia Records in 2015. Platten is best known for her diamond-certified single "Fight Song", which peaked at number 6 on the US Billboard Hot 100, topped charts in the UK, and peaked within the top ten of multiple charts worldwide. Platten won a Daytime Emmy Award for a live performance of the song on Good Morning America. Her major-label debut studio album, Wildfire (2016), was certified gold by the Recording Industry Association of America (RIAA) and featured the follow-up singles "Stand by You" and "Better Place". Her second major-label album, Waves (2017), came out a year later.

Outside of music, Platten participated in clothing brand Aerie's advertising campaign of photos that have not been retouched and appeared on the cover of The Improper Bostonian magazine's May 2018 issue. She has volunteered for more than 50 Musicians On Call programs since the early 2000s, which earned her a Music Heals Award at a benefit event on December 1, 2015.

== Early life ==
Rachel Ashley Platten was born on May 20, 1981, in Queens, New York City, to Paul and Pamela (née Jabush) Platten. She grew up in Newton Centre, Massachusetts, where she attended Mason-Rice Elementary School and Oak Hill Middle School. Paul is a senior manager with a global consulting firm, and Pamela is a psychotherapist with her own private practice. Platten is Jewish and has a younger sister, Melanie. She began piano lessons at the age of five and took up guitar in high school. Platten attended Buckingham Browne and Nichols high school and participated in musical theater. At Trinity College, she became a member of the Trinity College Trinitones, the college's first all-female a cappella group, due to her ability to beatbox.

As part of a study abroad program, Platten studied in Rome for a few months and went to Trinidad for a full semester to do an internship at a diplomat's office and at a record label. While she was there, Platten sang backup for a friend's band in front of over 80,000 people at the International Soca Monarch finals in 2002. According to Platten, from that moment on she knew she had to pursue music full-time.

In 2003, Platten graduated from Trinity College with a degree in political science.

== Career ==
=== 2003-2010: Trust in Me ===
In 2003, Platten self-released the R&B album Trust in Me. She moved to New York City's Greenwich Village, recorded demos, and performed in a Prince and Sly and the Family Stone cover band called Dayz of Wild. For two years, in exchange for her paying his phone bill, the band's piano player gave Platten piano and songwriting lessons. She worked several jobs, including as a waitress, a jingle writer, and an Estée Lauder salesperson.

In 2009, Platten signed with Freddy Wexler, a 23-year-old songwriter who'd just started a music management company, The Brain Music.

=== 2011–2014: Be Here ===
In April 2011, Platten's next album, Be Here, was released from Rock Ridge Music. The single "1,000 Ships", which she wrote with a trio of Swedish producers who'd worked with NSYNC and Cyndi Lauper, peaked at number 24 on the US Billboard Adult Top 40 chart and received some radio play. An earlier song, "Seven Weeks", was used for the film The Good Guy. The theme song for ABC Family's Jane by Design, "Work of Art", was performed by Platten on hire. Her song "Begin Again" was used in the Freeform teen drama television series Pretty Little Liars' 100th episode, "Miss Me x 100".

In 2012, Platten opened for Andy Grammer's tour, where she met her current manager, Ben Singer. "Don't Care What Time It Is" was used in VH1's Basketball Wives, and "You're Safe" was used in MTV's Finding Carter in September 2014. On June 27, 2014, Platten debuted "Fight Song" on the social networking website We Heart It as part of an artist spotlight. The song was featured in the Pretty Little Liars Christmas special six months later, which resulted in thousands of copies being sold per week.

=== 2015–2017: Wildfire ===
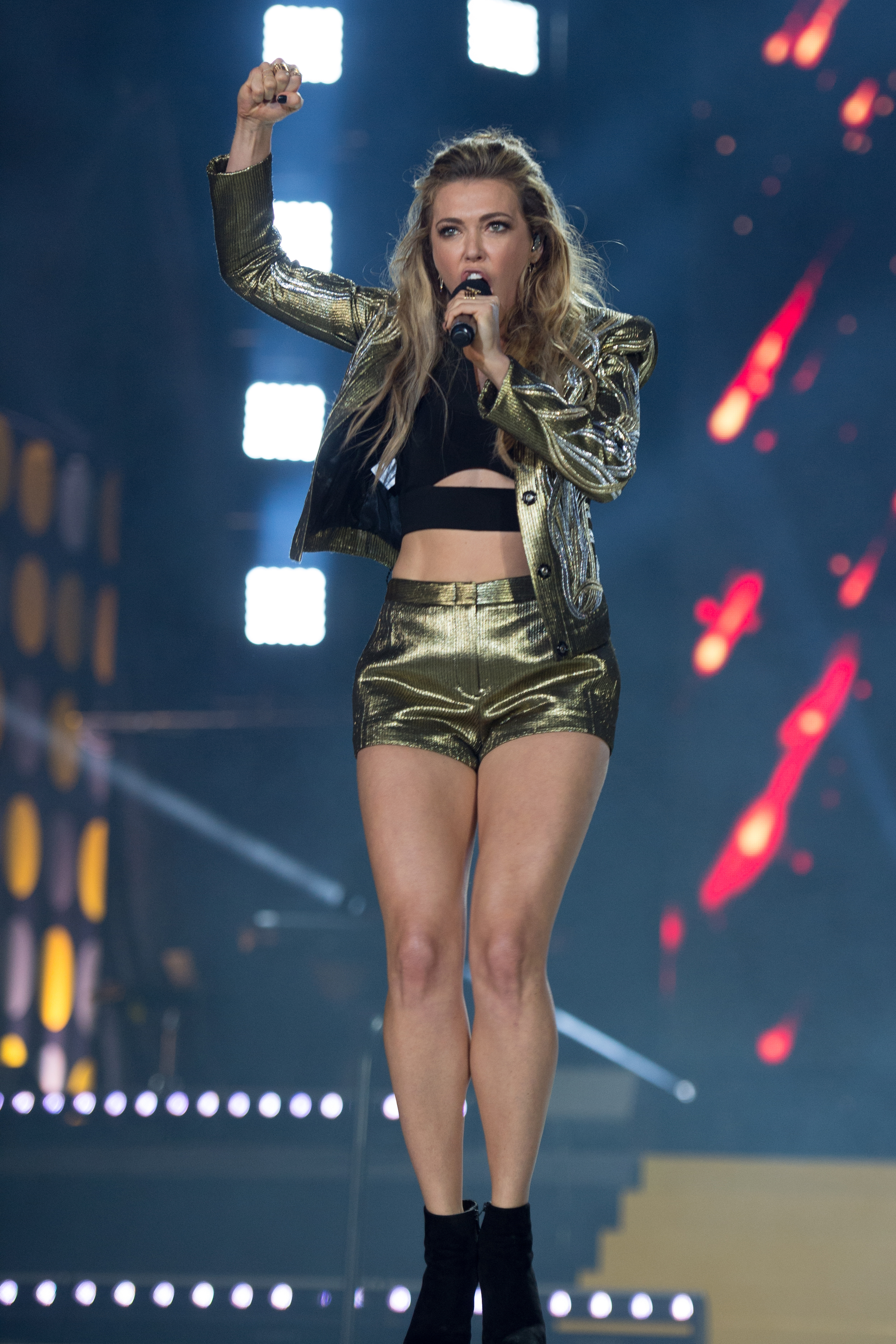
Platten singing at the closing of the 2016 Invictus Games in Orlando, Florida.

On February 19, 2015, Platten officially released "Fight Song". The song reached number six on the US Billboard Hot 100, number two on the Australian Singles Chart, number six in Ireland, number eight in New Zealand, number nine on the Billboard Canadian Hot 100, and number one on the UK Singles Chart. "Fight Song" also spent nine weeks at the top of the Billboard Adult Top 40 chart and was the ninth biggest-selling pop digital download song in 2015. In June 2015, Platten performed "Fight Song" with Taylor Swift in front of 50,000 people in Philadelphia during Swift's The 1989 World Tour. On March 20, 2026, "Fight Song" achieved Diamond certification in the US. Platten's 2015 Fight Song EP reached number 20 on the Billboard 200.

Platten served as a support act on Alex & Sierra's and Andy Grammer's "The Good Guys & A Girl Tour" in early 2015. She toured with Colbie Caillat and Christina Perri on their "Girls Night Out, Boys Can Come Too Tour" throughout the summer of 2015. On September 11, 2015, Platten released her second single, "Stand by You". It peaked in the top 10 in Canada and the US and in the top 20 in Australia and Poland. The song was certified platinum in the US on May 4, 2016.

Wildfire, Platten's first major label album, was released on January 1, 2016. It debuted at number five on the US Billboard 200 and was certified gold on March 9, 2016. A few weeks later, Platten released the third and final single from Wildfire, "Better Place". Throughout 2016, Platten promoted the album with her first major headlining tour, The Wildfire Tour.

After Christina Grimmie’s death and the Orlando nightclub shooting, Platten announced that proceeds from her new acoustic version of "Fight Song" would benefit the National Compassion Fund, working to support the needs of people impacted by the two events. In 2016, she appeared in insurance company Nationwide's commercial, where she sang the company's jingle, "Nationwide is on your side." In October 2016, she sang "The Star-Spangled Banner" prior to Game 1 of the 2016 World Series. On New Year's Eve 2016, Platten co-headlined the Times Square Ball festivities in New York City's Times Square alongside Gavin DeGraw performing "Fight Song", "Stand by You", "Beating Me Up", and John Lennon's "Imagine". In 2017, she served as an opening act for two Los Angeles shows and a Las Vegas show on Faith Hill and Tim McGraw's Soul2Soul: The World Tour.

=== 2017–present: Waves, I Am Rachel Platten and Fight Song (Rachel's Version) ===
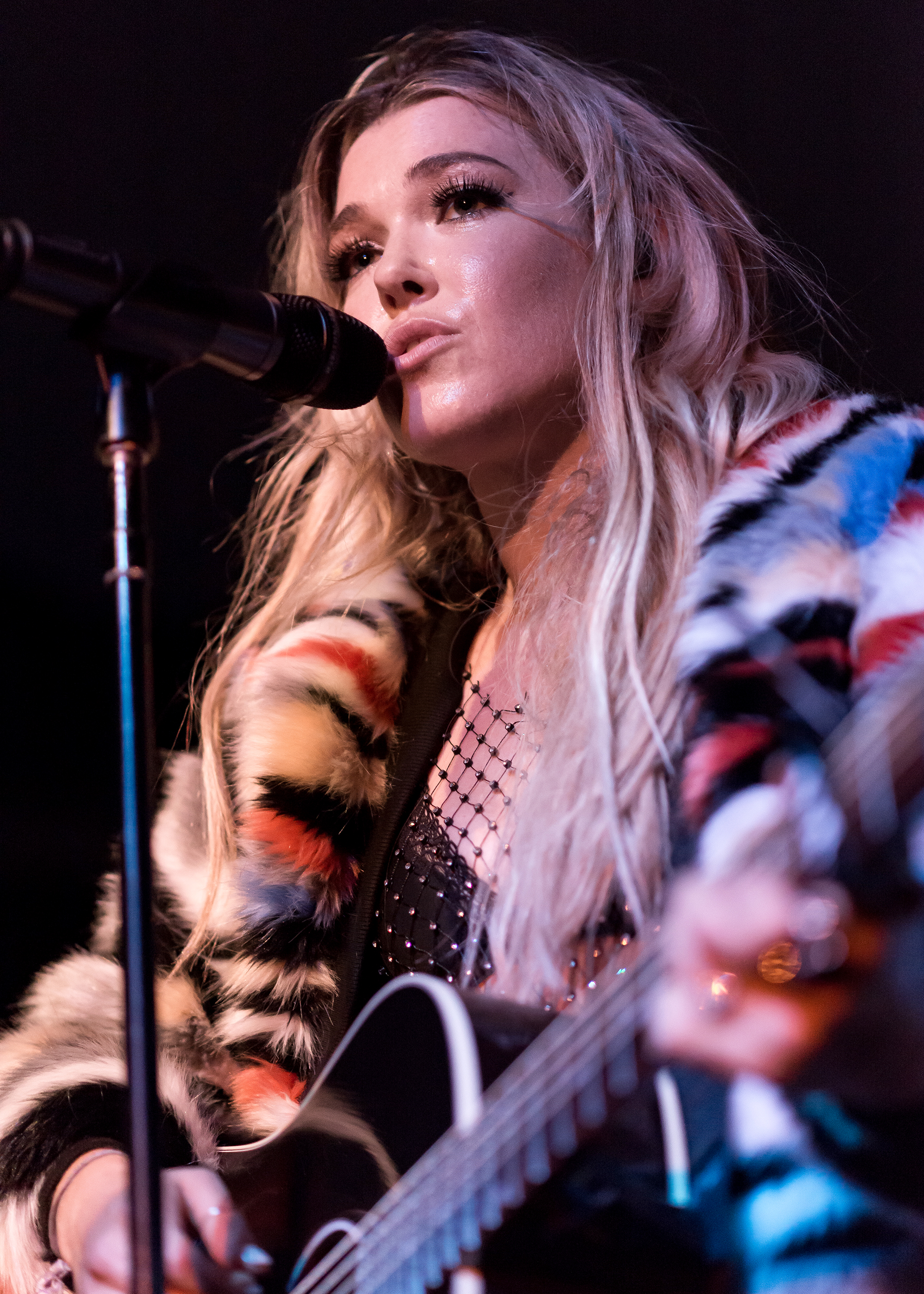
Platten on stage at the Peppermint Club in West Hollywood, California, November 2017

"Broken Glass", the lead single from her second major label album, Waves, was released on August 18, 2017. The album was released on October 27, 2017, and debuted at number 73 on the Billboard 200 chart. She co-wrote every song on the album. ABC News wrote in a favorable review:

Platten's songs often are cemented by a strong message to believe in one’s self. It may seem cheesy to the cynical listeners, but she always sounds like she believes every word she says. You have to give her credit for attempting to turn her art into an inspiring platform. Even when she gets a little too over-the-top on the self-referencing 'Good Life,' you can’t help but root for her.

In 2018, Platten was the main musical attraction at the Boston Pops Fireworks Spectacular. Along with performing her singles "Stand by You", "Better Place", and "Fight Song", Platten also reminisced about her childhood in Boston. From May to July 2019, she toured with a capella group Pentatonix as the opening act for their shows in North America. On March 31, 2020, Platten released a children's book titled You Belong, named after her 2018 single. In 2022, Platten performed "Stand by You" at A Capitol Fourth Independence Day concert in Washington, D.C., which aired on PBS on July 4, 2022.

In 2023, Platten released "Girls", a song about her daughters, and performed it at the Gracie Awards on May 23, 2024. On April 26, 2024, Platten released "Bad Thoughts", which she wrote to get through a panic attack. Her fifth studio album, I Am Rachel Platten, was released by her own label Violet Records on September 4, 2024.

On August 25, 2025, Platten announced Fight Song (Rachel's Version), a new album including re-recorded versions of "Fight Song", "Stand By You", and other songs from Wildfire. Fight Song (Rachel's Version) was released on September 26, 2025. Platten said the re-recording was inspired by Taylor Swift's re-recording project following Swift's masters dispute.

In 2026, Platten competed in season fourteen of The Masked Singer as the wild card contestant "Pangolin". She was eliminated in the semi-finals and did an encore of "Fight Song" after being unmasked.

== Public image ==
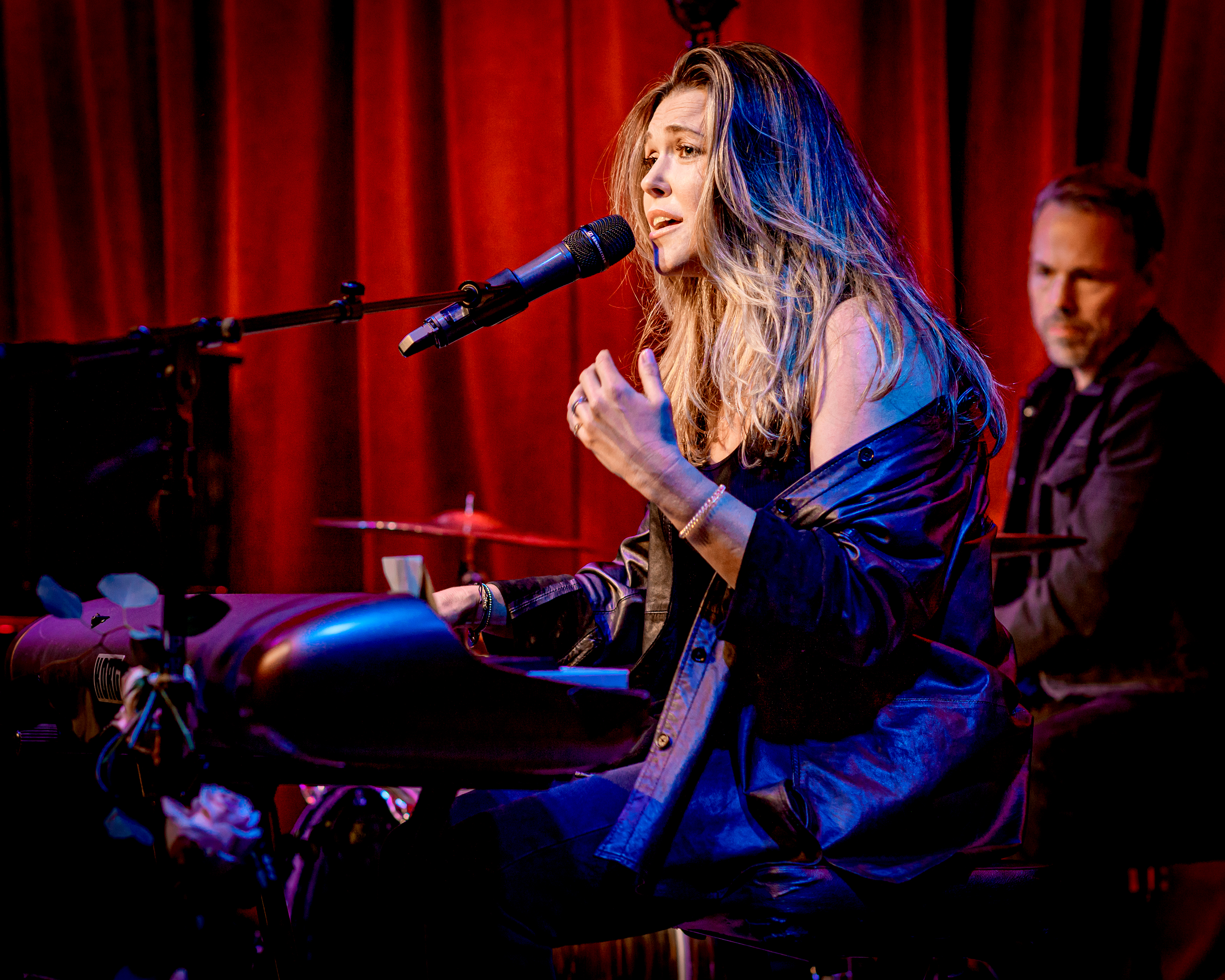
Platten performing at the Hotel Café in Hollywood, California, March 2022

Platten worked for nearly a decade playing cover performances and recording songs before gaining mainstream recognition as an artist. Her story and "Fight Song" has served as an inspiration for people around the world, who have used it as a motivation not to lose hope, when experiencing difficulties in life such as cancer, postpartum depression and unemployment. In 2017, Platten was presented with the Gracies Impact Award, which is given to an artist who has made a positive impact on society through their music. She wrote "Fight Song" at a low point, saying:

It was about my own journey and my own fire that would not die, that was regardless of how much rejections I was getting, and how impossible it seemed for me to keep trying to make this dream happen, that I just wouldn't give up. The song was written at a moment of really needing to decide, "Dude, I'm 32 or 31, this is a little pathetic. I need to figure this out and get on with my life." Then I wrote "Fight Song" in this moment of just sheer desperation. I will not give up on myself. That's where it came from.

In January 2018, Platten appeared as a model in clothing brand Aerie's advertising campaign of photos that have not been retouched. She appeared on the cover of The Improper Bostonian magazine's May 2018 issue.

=== Philanthropy ===
Platten has supported numerous charities including Music Unites, the Ryan Seacrest Foundation, Autism Speaks, Los Angeles LGBT Center, Memorial Sloan-Kettering, Boys & Girls Clubs of America, BuildOn, and Live Below the Line.

She has worked with Musicians on Call since the early 2000s and is part of a program where she sings bedside to hospital patients. Platten has volunteered for over 50 Musicians On Call programs. The organization honored her for her volunteer work with Music Heals Award at a benefit event on December 1, 2015. She performed "Fight Song" and walked the runway at the American Heart Association's Go Red For Women Red Dress Collection 2017 fashion show presented by Macy's at New York Fashion Week on February 9, 2017. Platten performed at Global Down Syndrome Foundation's virtual fashion show on November 14, 2020.

== Personal life ==
On July 31, 2010, when she was 29, Platten married Kevin Lazan in a Jewish ceremony. Their wedding pictures were featured in Southern New England Weddings magazine in 2010.

Platten and Lazan have two daughters, born on January 26, 2019, and September 9, 2021.

Platten has openly discussed experiencing postpartum depression after the births of her daughters.

== Discography ==
- Trust in Me (2003)
- Be Here (2011)
- Wildfire (2016)
- Waves (2017)
- I Am Rachel Platten (2024)

== Filmography ==
=== As herself ===
Film and television appearances
Year	Title	Role	Notes	Performance
2015	The Ellen DeGeneres Show	Musical guest	Episode: "Sofia Vergara/Rachel Platten/Stephen 'tWitch' Boss"	Performed "Stand By You"
2015	The X Factor	Performer	Episode: "Live Decider 6"	Performed "Stand By You"
2015	The 1989 World Tour Live	Herself	Taylor Swift's concert film	Performed "Fight Song" with Taylor Swift
2015–2025	Today	Herself	12 episodes	Various performances
2015–2024	Good Morning America	Musical guest and guest	8 episodes	Various performances
2016	Skavlan	Performer	Episode: "Michael Nyqvist/Petter Lindén Nyquist/Bill Bryson/ Rachel Platten"	Performed "Fight Song"
2016	2016 MLB All-Star Game	National Anthem Performer	TV special	Performed "The Star-Spangled Banner"
2016	Stuck in the Middle	Rachel Platten	Episode: "Stuck in the Harley Car"	Played herself and performed "Stand By You"
2016– 2024	The Talk	Guest co-host / Musical guest	4 episodes	2017, 2021: Served as a guest co-host
2017	Miss Universe 2017	Performer	TV special	Performed "Broken Glass"
2017	Lip Sync Battle	Performer	Episode: "Uzo Aduba vs. Danielle Brooks"	Performed "Fight Song" with Uzo Aduba
2017	Megyn Kelly Today	Musical guest	Episode: "Episode #1.25"	Performed "Broken Glass"
2018	Full Frontal with Samantha Bee	Musical guest	Episode: "January 10, 2018"	Performed "Fight Song"
2018	American Idol	Performer	Episode: "Top 24 Celebrity Duets"	Performed "Fight Song" with Mara Justine
2020	Celebrity Show-Off	Herself	Episode: "NeNe Leakes Is Here, Baby"	
2022	I Can See Your Voice	Panelist and Performer	Episode: "Rachel Platten, Robin Thicke, Raven Symone, Cheryl Hines, Adrienne Houghton"	Performed "Jolene" by Dolly Parton with a contestant
2022	A Capitol Fourth	Performer	Independence Day concert special	Performed "Stand By You"
2024	2024 NFL Wild Card Round	National Anthem Performer	Monday Night Football	Performed "The Star-Spangled Banner"
2025	The Kelly Clarkson Show	Musical guest	Episode: "Anna Kendrick/Gabriel Luna/Chef Josh Weissman/Rachel Platten"	Performed "Bad Thoughts"
2026	The Masked Singer	Contestant (Pangolin)	4 episodes	Various performances

== Awards and nominations ==
Year	Ceremony	Award	Nominated work	Result	Ref.
2015	Teen Choice Awards	Choice Music: Breakout Artist	Herself	Nominated	
2015	Teen Choice Awards	Choice Summer Song	"Fight Song"	Nominated	
2015	Musicians On Call organization	Music Heals Award	Herself	Won	
2016	iHeartRadio Music Awards	Best Lyrics	"Fight Song"	Won	
2016	Radio Disney Music Awards	Breakout Artist Of The Year	Herself	Nominated	
2016	Billboard Music Awards	Top Selling Song	"Fight Song"	Nominated	
2016	Daytime Emmy Awards	Outstanding Musical Performance in a Talk Show/Morning Program	Good Morning America	Won	
2016	American Music Awards	Favorite Adult Contemporary Artist	Herself	Nominated	
2017	Gracie Awards	Gracie Impact Award	Herself	Won	
2023	Depth of Field International Film Festival Competition	Award of Exceptional Merit for Original Song	"Fight Song"	Won	
2023	Vegas Movie Awards	Award of Prestige for Best Song (Miracle at Manchester)	"Fight Song"	Won	
2023	Christian Film Festival	Festival Award for Best Song	"Fight Song"	Won	

== Tours ==
=== Headlining ===
- The Wildfire Tour (2016)
- The Set Me Free Tour (2025)

=== Co-headlining ===
- Girls Night Out, Boys Can Come Too Tour (with Colbie Caillat and Christina Perri) (2015)

=== Supporting act ===
- The Good Guys & A Girl Tour (Alex & Sierra and Andy Grammer)

=== Opening act ===
- Soul2Soul: The World Tour (Faith Hill and Tim McGraw) (2017)
- Pentatonix: The World Tour (Pentatonix) (2019)
