= I Am Rachel Platten =

Studio album by Rachel Platten
- Released: September 3, 2024
- Studio: Nashville
- Length: 47:44
- Label: Violet
- Producers: Rachel Platten; Gian Stone; Jason Evigan; Nick Lee; Jon Levine

Rachel Platten chronology
Waves (2017)	I Am Rachel Platten (2024)

Singles from I Am Rachel Platten
- 1. "Girls" Released: May 12, 2023; 2. "Mercy" Released: January 24, 2024; 3. "Bad Thoughts" Released: April 26, 2024; 4. "I Know" Released: July 10, 2024; 5. "I Don't Really Care (Set Me Free)" Released: September 5, 2024

I Am Rachel Platten is the fifth studio album by American singer and songwriter Rachel Platten. It was released on September 3, 2024, under her own independent label Violet Records. It marks her first studio album in seven years, since the release of Waves (2017).

== Background and release ==
Described by Platten as "the medicine I needed in the darkest moments of my life", the album tackles her struggles with mental health issues, such as anxiety and postpartum depression, dealing with the public perception of her as an artist, as well her departure from her former major record label, events that happened during her seven-year hiatus.

The album was released on September 3, 2024.

"Plattenums, Wow... we did it. It’s September 3rd and this album of mine that you patiently and lovingly waited for, 5 years now, is yours today. Thank you for your faith and support. I know that without it I might have kept this music for myself, too afraid to release these deeply personal songs into a world that feels so broken sometimes. But you kept listening and writing me and creating videos with my songs and you shared and streamed and you messaged me, so many of you with your own deeply personal stories of your own dark nights, and how my music helped you.

And feeling all of that, even in the midst of the hardest time of my life, it gave me a spark, a feeling of hope that maybe, just maybe, these songs that I was writing to heal myself, might be for you, too. And maybe my story wasn’t over yet. Thank you. Truly. I am so proud to be here today, strong and ready to release this music and to love on all of you through these songs. I can’t wait for you to hear this album!

Now go get some headphones, tissues 😆 and some room to dance and FEEL. And enjoy.

Love,Rachel Platten"

— Rachel Platten, on the release day of "I Am Rachel Platten" via Instagram.

== Promotion ==
The lead single, "Girls", which is dedicated to Platten's daughters, was released on May 12, 2023, alongside a music video directed by Mark Jeffrey.

"Mercy" served as the second single of the album, the self-written track was released on January 24, 2024. A third single titled, "Bad Thoughts" was released on April 26, alongside an official music video, directed by Jade Ehlers and Brooke Harcrow.

"I Know" was released as the album's fourth single on July 10, alongside an extended play of the same name, featuring the previously released singles, as well the album details including title, tracklist, date of release and artwork.

"Set Me Free" was released as the album fifth single on September 5, the song was later re-titled as "I Don't Really Care (Set Me Free)".

To further promote the album Platten embarked on the Set Me Free Tour in March 2025. It was her first headliner tour in eight years.

== Reception ==
Professional ratings
Review scores
Source	Rating
Riff Magazine	7/10 stars

Upon release, I Am Rachel Platten received positive reviews by music critics, who praised Platten's honest songwriting and artistic growth.

Writing for American Songwriter, Robyn Flans praised the album and Platten's confidence, stating that I Am Rachel Platten is a "declaration of freedom, her proclamation of maturation, her edict of growth, the bullhorn to the world that she is back stronger, secure, and solid."

Gabrielle Groves of Music Scene Media praised the album lyrical relatability, as well her emotional vocal performance, writing that "While most people wouldn't think of voice cracks as a good thing, Platten is one of the few artists who can make them sound graceful. They have become a signature characteristic of her music and help emphasize the emotions in her songs."

Robert Frezza of The Aquarian dubbed the record as "an incredible collection of songs", while praising the lyrical content saying: "If her mission was to spread positivity and strength through, she has completed it 10 times over."

== Track listing ==
I Am Rachel Platten track listing
No.	Title	Lyrics	Producer	Length
1.	"I'll Be Her"	Rachel Platten; Nick Lee; Kyan Palmer	Rachel Platten; Gian Stone; Jason Evigan; Nick Lee	3:16
2.	"I Know"	Platten; Jon Levine	Platten; Stone; Evigan; Jon Levine	3:05
3.	"First Day"	Platten; Gian Stone; Freddy Wexler	Platten; Stone; Evigan	3:01
4.	"Slow December"	Platten; Stone; Jason Evigan; Ferras Alqaisi; Meghan Kabir; Sean Myer	Platten; Stone; Evigan	3:53
5.	"The River"	Platten; Craig Meyer	Platten; Stone; Evigan	6:03
6.	"Bad Thoughts"	Platten; Lee; Palmer	Platten; Stone; Evigan; Lee	4:35
7.	"Mercy"	Platten	Platten; Stone; Evigan	3:34
8.	"Surrendering"	Platten; Lee; Palmer	Platten; Stone; Evigan; Lee	2:55
9.	"I Don't Really Care (Set Me Free)"	Platten; Stone; Evigan; Wexler	Platten; Stone; Evigan	3:36
10.	"Girls"	Platten; Alqaisi; Kabir; Myer	Platten; Stone; Evigan	2:51
11.	"Gimme Something"	Platten; Stone; Evigan; Wexler	Platten; Stone; Evigan	3:32
12.	"Need You"	Platten; Emma-Lee; Karen Kosowski	Platten; Stone; Evigan	3:28
13.	"Caroline" (featuring Michael Bolton)	Platten; Michael Bolton; Stone; Evigan	Platten; Stone	3:49
Total length:				47:44

== Personnel ==
- Rachel Platten – vocals, producer
- Gian Stone – producer
- Jason Evigan – producer
- Nick Lee – producer
- Jon Levine – producer
- Michael Bolton – vocals

== Release history ==
Release dates and formats for I Am Rachel Platten
Region	Date	Format	Label	Ref.
Various	September 3, 2024	LP; CD; digital download; streaming; vinyl	Violet	
