= Fight Song (EP) =

EP by Rachel Platten
- Released: May 12, 2015
- Genre: Pop
- Length: 13:26
- Label: Columbia
- Producer: Jon Levine; Brian West

Rachel Platten chronology
Be Here (2011)	Fight Song (2015)	Wildfire (2016)

Fight Song is the debut extended play (EP) released by American singer and songwriter Rachel Platten on May 12, 2015, by Columbia Records, her first release for the label. The EP includes the top-10 single of the same name, "Fight Song", and was released in promotion of Platten's debut major-label album, Wildfire (2016). Fight Song peaked at number 20 on the Billboard 200, and has sold 26,000 copies in the US as of December 2015.

== Critical reception ==
Marcy Donelson of AllMusic praised the "relatably introspective" lyrical content of the extended play and deemed the "pure anthem pop" style akin to a more sincere Katy Perry. Mike Wass of Idolator called the collection "excellent," noting how it builds on the success of the title track while also "[proving] there’s more to [Platten] than uplifting, self-help anthems."

== Track listing ==
Standard edition
No.	Title	Writer(s)	Producer(s)	Length
1.	"Fight Song"	Rachel Platten; Dave Bassett	Levine	3:24
2.	"Lone Ranger"	Platten; Bonnie Baker; Brian West	West	3:07
3.	"Beating Me Up"	Platten; Levine; Rune Westberg	Levine	3:09
4.	"Congratulations"	Platten; Levine; Scott Jacoby	Levine	3:46
Total length:				13:26

== Charts ==
=== Weekly charts ===
Chart (2015)	Peak position
US Billboard 200	20

=== Year-end charts ===
Chart (2015)	Position
US Billboard 200	112
