= Stand by You (Rachel Platten song) =

Single by Rachel Platten

from the album Wildfire
- Released: September 11, 2015
- Recorded: 2015
- Studio: The Synagogue (Los Angeles, CA); The Village Recorder (Los Angeles, CA); EastWest Studios (Los Angeles, CA)
- Genre: Pop
- Length: 3:39
- Label: Columbia
- Songwriters: Rachel Platten; Jack Antonoff; Joy Williams; Matt Morris; Jon Levine
- Producer: Jon Levine

Rachel Platten singles chronology
"Fight Song" (2015)	"Stand by You" (2015)	"Better Place" (2016)

Music video
- "Stand by You" on YouTube

"Stand by You" is the second single by American singer and songwriter Rachel Platten's major label debut studio album, Wildfire (2016). The song was released on September 11, 2015, by Columbia Records. The song peaked at number 37 on the Billboard Hot 100, making it her second consecutive top-40 song. "Stand by You" reached the top of the Adult Top 40 chart in February 2016.

On October 5, 2016, Platten released the lyric video for a Spanish version of the song entitled "Siempre Estaré Ahí" (Spanish for "Always Be There"), featuring Argentine singer Diego Torres.

On August 25, 2025, Platten announced Fight Song (Rachel's Version), a new album including re-recorded versions of "Stand by You", "Fight Song", and other songs from Wildfire. Fight Song (Rachel's Version) was released on September 26, 2025.

== Composition ==
According to the sheet music published at Musicnotes.com by Sony/ATV Songs LLC, "Stand by You" is written in the key of A major with a moderate tempo of 94 beats per minute. The song follows a chord progression of A – D – E, and Platten's vocals span from E_{3} to F♯_{5}.

== Critical reception ==
The song received critical acclaim. Mike Wass of Idolator said it is a "mood-lifting anthem". Jason Scott of Popdust stated "Instead of projecting the message onto herself and her own journey, [...] she etches out a storyline of hope as she reaches out to her fellow underdog. Platten, who is a testament that age (sometimes) is no boundary to pop, then climbs higher on the monumental chorus. Her vocals are markedly more confident, too, exuding wisdom (and adorned with unfettered coolness). 'I'm gonna stand by you. Even if we're breaking down, we can find a way to break through,' rings the resounding hook, an interplay between her career-defining moment and those severely aching for one." He also claimed, "The larger-than-life narrative is charming and only furthers the singer's worthiness of being heard."

== Music video ==
On November 6, 2015, the official music video for the song was released to YouTube. It was directed by Hannah Lux Davis.

== Track listing ==
CD single and digital download

1. "Stand by You" – 3:39

Other versions

- Dave Aude Extended Mix – 4:27
- Dave Aude 100 Remix – 3:24
- Dave Aude Instrumental – 3:24
- DJ Mike D Mixshow Mix – 3:52
- DJ Mike D Radio Edit – 3:23
- Acoustic – 3:53 (From Wildfire – Target Exclusive Edition)

== Charts ==
=== Weekly charts ===
Chart (2015–2016)	Peak position
Australia (ARIA)	14
Belgium (Ultratip Bubbling Under Flanders)	63
Canada Hot 100 (Billboard)	42
Canada AC (Billboard)	5
Canada CHR/Top 40 (Billboard)	47
Canada Hot AC (Billboard)	9
Poland Airplay (ZPAV)	16
Slovakia Airplay (ČNS IFPI)	45
Sweden Heatseeker (Sverigetopplistan)	10
US Billboard Hot 100	37
US Adult Contemporary (Billboard)	8
US Adult Pop Airplay (Billboard)	1
US Pop Airplay (Billboard)	21

=== Year-end charts ===
Chart (2016)	Position
US Adult Contemporary (Billboard)	17
US Adult Top 40 (Billboard)	16

== Certifications ==
Region	Certification	Certified units/sales
Australia (ARIA)	Platinum	70,000^{‡}
Canada (Music Canada)	Gold	40,000^{*}
New Zealand (RMNZ)	Gold	15,000^{‡}
Poland (ZPAV)	Gold	10,000^{‡}
United States (RIAA)	Platinum	886,000
^{*} Sales figures based on certification alone.^{‡} Sales+streaming figures based on certification alone.
