= Wildfire (Rachel Platten album) =

Studio album by Rachel Platten
- Released: January 1, 2016
- Recorded: 2015
- Genre: Pop
- Length: 40:48
- Labels: Columbia; Sony
- Producers: Jon Levine and Brian West

Rachel Platten chronology
Fight Song (2015)	Wildfire (2016)	Waves (2017)

Singles from Wildfire
- 1. "Fight Song" Released: February 19, 2015; 2. "Stand by You" Released: September 11, 2015; 3. "Better Place" Released: May 9, 2016

Wildfire is the third studio album by American singer and songwriter Rachel Platten. It was her first to be released under a major record label and was released on January 1, 2016, by Columbia Records and Sony Music Entertainment.

The album was a commercial success. It debuted at number five on the US Billboard 200, with 45,000 album-equivalent units (29,000 from pure album sales) in its first week. On March 9, 2016, the album was certified gold by the Recording Industry Association of America (RIAA) for combined sales and streaming equivalent units of 500,000 units.

The album includes "Fight Song", released in February 2015, which peaked at number six on the Billboard Hot 100, and topped the charts in Scotland and the United Kingdom. The album's second single, "Stand by You", was released on September 11, 2015. The album's third single, "Better Place", was released on March 24, 2016. The album was promoted by Platten's first Headline tour "The Wildfire tour".

On August 25, 2025, Platten announced Fight Song (Rachel's Version), a new album including re-recorded versions of "Fight Song", "Stand By You" and other songs from Wildfire. Fight Song (Rachel's Version) was released on September 26, 2025.

== Promotion ==
=== Singles ===
On February 19, 2015, "Fight Song" was released as the lead single from Platten's Fight Song EP. "Fight Song" peaked at number six on the US Billboard Hot 100 and topped the UK Singles Chart. "Stand by You" was released as the lead single from Wildfire on September 11, 2015. It has since peaked at number thirty seven on the Billboard Hot 100. The songs "Lone Ranger", "Beating Me Up", and "Congratulations" were available as pre-order singles (previously released as part of the Fight Song EP), as well as "Better Place". On March 24, 2016, "Better Place" was released as the third single from the album.

=== Tour ===
To promote the album, Platten embarked on her first headlining concert tour, entitled The Wildfire Tour. The tour began on February 26, 2016, in Dallas, Texas and ended in November 2016 in Los Angeles.

== Critical reception ==
Professional ratings
Aggregate scores
Source	Rating
Metacritic	52/100
Review scores
Source	Rating
AllMusic	3/5 stars
The Boston Globe	Positive
Digital Journal	A
The Guardian	2/5 stars
The Herald-Standard	Positive
The Irish Times	3/5 stars
Starpulse	3/5 stars
The Red and Black	Positive

Wildfire received mixed reviews from music critics. At Metacritic, which assigns a normalized rating out of 100 to reviews from mainstream critics, the album has an average score of 52 out of 100, which indicates "mixed or average reviews" based on four reviews. Stephen Thomas Erlewine of AllMusic rated the album three out of five stars and states: "Platten specializes in skyscraping melodies and big, bombastic surfaces and these are the elements that not only fuel Wildfire, they distinguish it from the singer/songwriter's clear antecedents." At Digital Journal, Markos Papadatos rated the album an "A", affirming that "Rachel Platten has set the bar high already with her brand new album, Wildfire. There are no filler tracks on this release. It garners an A rating." Tony Clayton-Lea of The Irish Times rated the album three stars out of five and states the songs are "Pop songs built to withstand a wrecking ball." In a positive review for The Red and Black, Emma Korstanje writes the album "is made memorable by her juxtaposition of sassy, confident songs with others featuring raw emotion."

== Track listing ==
Standard edition
No.	Title	Writer(s)	Producer(s)	Length
1.	"Stand by You"	Rachel Platten; Jack Antonoff; Joy Williams; Jon Levine; Matt Morris	Levine	3:39
2.	"Hey Hey Hallelujah" (featuring Andy Grammer)	Emanuel Kiriakou; E. Kidd Bogart; Caroline Ailin; Zukhan Bey; Platten; Andy Grammer	Levine	2:56
3.	"Speechless"	Platten; Nolan Lambroza; Maureen McDonald	Levine	3:19
4.	"Beating Me Up"	Platten; Rune Westberg	Levine	3:09
5.	"Fight Song"	Platten; Dave Bassett	Levine	3:24
6.	"Better Place"	Platten; Sally Seltmann	Levine	2:56
7.	"Lone Ranger"	Bonnie Baker; Platten; Brian West	West	3:10
8.	"You Don't Know My Heart"	Platten; Robert Hawkins	Levine	3:34
9.	"Angels in Chelsea"	Platten; Nash Overstreet; West	Levine; West	3:56
10.	"Astronauts"	Platten; Bassett	Levine	3:37
11.	"Congratulations"	Platten; Scott Jacoby	Levine	3:46
12.	"Superman"	Platten; Chris DeStefano; Lindy Robbins	Levine	3:22
Total length:				40:48

Target bonus tracks
No.	Title	Writer(s)	Producer(s)	Length
13.	"Lonely Planet"	Platten; Nolan Sipe; Ryan Petersen	Levine	3:09
14.	"Stand by You" (Acoustic)	Platten; Levine; Antonoff; Williams; Morris	Levine	3:53
15.	"Speechless" (Acoustic)	Platten; Lambroza; McDonald	Levine	3:31
Total length:				51:21

Japan bonus tracks
No.	Title	Writer(s)	Producer(s)	Length
16.	"Fight Song" (Dave Aude Remix)	Platten; Bassett	Levine	3:21
17.	"Stand By You" (DJ Mike D Remix)	Platten; Antonoff; Williams; Levine; Morris	Levine	3:22
Total length:				58:04

== Personnel ==
Musicians

- Rachel Platten – vocals (all tracks), piano (5, 7), acoustic guitar (7)
- Jon Levine – bass, keyboards (1–6, 8, 10–12); drum programming (1), piano (1, 3, 4, 6, 8–12), guitar (2, 5, 11), organ (2, 7, 9), programming (2–5, 8, 10–12), strings (4)
- Aaron Sterling – drums (1, 3, 4, 8, 10)
- Jon Sosin – guitar (1, 3, 4, 6, 11), ukulele (4)
- Donald Hayes – alto saxophone, tenor saxophone (2)
- Jacob Sceney – baritone saxophone (2)
- Lemar Guillary – trombone (2)
- Cameron Johnson – trumpet (2)
- Andy Grammer – vocals (2)
- Evan Kidd Bogart – vocals (2)
- Simon Huber – cello (3, 6, 11)
- Andrew Wells – guitar (3)
- Sonia Rao – violin (3)
- The International Agape Choir – background vocals (7)
- Marc Rogers – bass (7)
- Dash Hutton – drums (7, 9)
- Brian West – programming (7, 9), synthesizer (7); guitar, vocals (9)
- Aubrey Cleland – background vocals (9)
- Donnie Anderson – background vocals (9)
- Nash Overstreet – background vocals, electric guitar, percussion (9)
- Maxwell Roach – drums (12)

Technical

- Tom Coyne – mastering
- Eric Boulanger – mastering (7, 11)
- Joe Zook – mixing (1–6, 8–12)
- Nick Radovanovic – mixing (7)
- Dan Piscina – engineering
- Brian West – engineering (7, 9)
- Scott Elgin – engineering (7, 9)
- Jeremy Miller – engineering assistance (2)

== Charts ==
=== Weekly charts ===
Chart (2016)	Peak position
Australian Albums (ARIA)	12
Belgian Albums (Ultratop Flanders)	132
Canadian Albums (Billboard)	6
Irish Albums (IRMA)	84
Japanese Albums (Oricon)	38
Japanese Hot Albums (Billboard Japan)	22
New Zealand Albums (RMNZ)	37
Norwegian Albums (VG-lista)	36
Scottish Albums (Official Charts)	23
South Korean Albums International (Gaon)	72
South Korean Albums Overseas (Gaon)	10
Swedish Albums (Sverigetopplistan)	29
Swiss Albums (Schweizer Hitparade)	85
Taiwanese Albums (Five Music)	4
UK Albums (Official Charts)	35
UK Album Downloads (Official Charts)	26
US Billboard 200	5

=== Year-end charts ===
Chart (2016)	Position
Swedish Albums (Sverigetopplistan)	95
US Billboard 200	101

== Certifications ==
Region	Certification	Certified units/sales
New Zealand (RMNZ)	Platinum	15,000^{‡}
United States (RIAA)	Gold	500,000^{‡}
^{‡} Sales+streaming figures based on certification alone.

== Release history ==
Region	Date	Version	Format	Label	Ref.
Worldwide	January 1, 2016	Standard	Digital download; CD	Sony Music	
United States	January 1, 2016	Deluxe	CD	Columbia	
Japan	April 13, 2016	Deluxe	Digital download; CD	Sony Music Japan	
