= List of Christian mass media organizations =

This is a list of Christian mass media organizations.

== Christian broadcasting ==
=== Christian television ===
==== Christian television programs ====
- The Sound Show

==== Christian television networks ====
SAT-7 is a Christian satellite television organization based in Nicosia, Cyprus and broadcasting 24/7 in Arabic, Persian, and Turkish across 22 countries in the Middle East and North Africa, as well as 50 countries in Europe. Founded in 1995, SAT-7 is the first and largest Christian satellite organization serving the region. Terence Ascott, Founder, has served as International CEO from 1995 through 2019. His successor, Rita Elmounayer, joined SAT-7 in 1996 where she worked as a producer, writer, and was the first presenter on-screen when the network began broadcasting. She has served as the International CEO as of April 1, 2019. More than 80 percent of programming is produced in the Middle East by Middle Easterners. The network broadcasts "free to air" to viewers and as a nonprofit organization is supported financially by interested individuals from the region, Europe, Asia, and North America. In 2011, viewership was estimated at over 15 million.

Trinity Broadcasting Network TBN is the world's largest religious network and America's most watched faith channel. In 1973, Paul and Jan Crouch founded the network with the flagship show entitled "Praise the Lord". TBN offers 24 hours of commercial-free inspirational programming for Protestant, Catholic and Messianic Jewish denominations. Programs are translated into numerous foreign languages at the International Production Center in Irving, Texas. Across America and around the world TBN is carried by TV stations and cable systems to millions of homes. As of 2012, TBN is featured on over 5,000 television stations, 33 satellites, the Internet and thousands of cable systems around the world.

==== Christian television stations ====
- KDSO-LD

== Christian music organizations ==
=== Christian music festivals ===
- Agape Music Festival
- Alive Festival
- Big Boss' Festival
- BigChurchDayOut
- Christmas Rock Night
- Clover Festival
- Cornerstone Festival
- Cornerstone Florida
- Creation Fest
- Creation Festival
- Festival Con Dios
- Festival of Faith and Music
- Flevo Festival
- Freakstock
- The Gathering (Serious4God)
- Glory at the Gardens
- Greenbelt festival
- Harvest Crusade
- Ichthus Music Festival
- LifeLight Music Festival
- Lifest
- Maata Näkyvissä Festival
- Music in the Rockies
- Night of Joy
- Parachute music festival
- Praise
- Purple Door
- Revelation Generation
- Rock the Coast
- Rock the Desert
- Rock the Universe
- Seminole Sing
- ShoutFest
- Sonfest
- Songfest
- Sonshine Festival
- Soulfest
- Spirit West Coast
- TOMfest
- Unity Christian Music Festival
- Youth of the Nation Conference

=== Christian music groups ===
==== Gospel musical groups ====
===== United States =====
- BeBe & CeCe Winans
- Brooklyn Tabernacle Choir
- Charles and Taylor
- Commissioned
- Deep River Boys
- Doyle Lawson & Quicksilver
- Dynamic Praise
- Five Blind Boys of Mississippi
- God's Property
- Gold City
- Gospel Music Workshop of America
- Guy & Ralna
- Harlem Gospel Choir
- Kevin Davidson and The Voices
- Mary Mary
- Meditation Singers
- Mighty Clouds of Joy
- Mississippi Mass Choir
- Mitchell's Christian Singers
- One Nation Crew
- Out of Eden
- Pilgrim Travelers
- Ramiyah
- Saints Unified Voices
- Selah Jubilee Singers
- Sensational Nightingales
- Singing Americans
- Sounds of Blackness
- Swan Silvertones
- Sweet Honey in the Rock
- Sweet Inspirations
- Take 6
- The Arnolds
- The Blackwood Brothers
- The Blind Boys of Alabama
- The Caravans
- The Clark Sisters
- The Cockman Family
- The Crabb Family
- The Crownsmen
- The Davis Sisters
- The Dixie Hummingbirds
- The Drinkard Singers
- The FAMU Gospel Choir
- The Gabbards
- The Gospel Harmony Boys
- The Gospel Hummingbirds
- The Jody Brown Indian Family
- The Lee Boys
- The Lighthouse Boys
- The Make-Up
- The Marksmen
- The Martins
- The McKameys
- The Messengers Choir
- The Oak Ridge Boys
- The Philharmonics
- The Rambos
- The Roberta Martin Singers
- The Spiritual Harmonizers
- The Staple Singers
- The Stovall Sisters
- The Winans
- Thurman Ruth
- Total Experience Gospel Choir
- Trace Family Trio
- Trin-i-tee 5:7
- Virtue
- Wendy Bagwell and the Sunliters
- Winans family

===== Miscellaneous and unclassified =====
- Almighty Defenders
- Chicago Mass Choir
- Choralerna
- Colorado Mass Choir
- Diante do Trono
- Dublin Gospel Choir
- Frisk Luft
- Georgia Mass Choir
- Gospel quartet
- L.A. Mass Choir
- London Community Gospel Choir
- Milele
- The Brown Singers
- The Wades
- The Weatherfords

==== Gospel quartets ====
- Golden Gate Quartet
- The Hinsons
- The Homeland Harmony Quartet
- Jubilee quartet
- Stamps Quartet
- The Statesmen Quartet
- The Soul Stirrers

==== Christian hip hop groups ====
- 116 Clique
- Basehead
- DC Talk
- Deepspace5
- GRITS
- Group 1 Crew
- LA Symphony
- Mars ILL
- Rapture Ruckus
- Souljahz
- Soul-Junk
- The Cross Movement

===== Christian heavy metal groups =====
====== United States ======
- Aletheian (tech. metal)
- As Cities Burn (metalcore/post-hardcore)
- As I Lay Dying (metalcore)
- Barren Cross (power metal)
- Becoming the Archetype (tech. metal/ prog. metal)
- Corpus Christi (metalcore)
- Destroy the Runner (metalcore)
- Die Happy (power metal/hard rock)
- Disciple (alt. metal/hard rock)
- East West (nu-metal)
- Figure Four (metalcore)
- Guardian (power metal)
- Gwen Stacy (metalcore)
- Holy Soldier (power metal)
- I Am Terrified (metalcore/post-hardcore)
- Inhale Exhale (metalcore)
- Jacobs Dream (power metal)
- Joshua (power metal/hard rock)
- Kids in the Way (nu-metal/hard rock)
- Klank (industrial)
- Magdallan (power metal)
- Maylene and the Sons of Disaster (southern metal)
- Mortal Treason (deathcore/metalcore)
- Neon Cross (power metal)
- Oil (power metal)
- Once Dead (thrash metal)
- Peace of Mind (nu-metal)
- Philadelphia (power metal)
- Place of Skulls (doom metal)
- Point of Recognition (metalcore)
- Raid (metalcore)
- Remove the Veil (metalcore)
- Sacrament (thrash metal)
- Sacred Warrior (power metal)
- Saint (power metal)
- Saviour Machine (power metal)
- Sever Your Ties (metalcore/post-hardcore)
- Sinai Beach (metalcore)
- Since October (metalcore)
- SinDizzy (power metal)
- Six Feet Deep (metalcore/sludge metal)
- Sleeping Giant (metalcore)
- Soul Embraced (metalcore/death metal)
- Spitfire (mathcore)
- Stryken (power metal)
- Stryper (power metal)
- Temple of Blood (thrash metal)
- Terminal (metalcore/post-hardcore)
- The Chariot (metalcore/mathcore)
- Theocracy (power metal)
- Trenches (metalcore/sludge metal)
- Trytan (power metal)
- Twelve Gauge Valentine (metalcore/southern metal)
- Ultimatum (thrash metal)
- Whitecross (power metal)
- With Blood Comes Cleansing (deathcore)
- XDEATHSTARx (metalcore)
- XDISCIPLEx A.D. (metalcore)

====== Australia ======
- Embodiment 12:14 (metalcore)
- Lightforce (power metal)
- Paramaecium (doom metal/death metal)
- Virgin Black (black metal)

====== Sweden, Finland and Norway ======
- Audiovision (power metal)
- Blindside (nu-metal)
- Callisto (post-metal)
- Deuteronomium (death metal)
- Divinefire (power metal)
- Harmony (power metal)
- HB (power metal)
- Immortal Souls (death metal)
- Leviticus (power metal)
- Mehida (power metal)
- Narnia (power metal)
- Pantokrator (death metal)
- Sacrificium (death metal)
- Seventh Avenue (power metal)

====== Miscellaneous ======
- 2Tm2,3 (power metal)
- Altar (thrash metal)
- Ashen Mortality (doom metal)
- Balance of Power (power metal)
- Blood Covenant (symphonic metal)
- Mad Max (power metal/hard rock)
- Morphia (doom metal)
- Necromance (black metal)
- Oficina G3 (prog. metal)
- Opprobrium (death metal)
- Seventh Angel (thrash metal)
- Shout (power metal/hard rock)
- Tierra Santa (power metal/hard rock)
- XT (power metal)

===== Christian alternative metal groups =====
====== United States ======
- Decyfer Down
- Demon Hunter
- Living Sacrifice
- Mortal
- Skillet
- The Crucified

====== Miscellaneous and unclassified ======
- Argyle Park
- August Burns Red
- Blessthefall
- Burden of a Day
- Circle of Dust
- Embodyment
- Emery
- Flyleaf
- Haste the Day
- Kutless
- Norma Jean
- Oh, Sleeper
- One Bad Pig
- Seventh Day Slumber
- The Devil Wears Prada
- The Showdown
- Underoath

===== Christian extreme metal groups =====
- Believer
- Bloodgood
- Bride
- Deliverance
- Eternal Mystery
- Impending Doom
- Mortification
- Tourniquet
- Vengeance Rising

===== Christian rapcore/nu metal groups =====
- Every Day Life
- Pillar
- P.O.D.
- .rod laver
- TobyMac
- Travail

===== Unblack metal musical groups =====
- Crimson Thorn
- Admonish
- Antestor
- Crimson Moonlight
- Drottnar
- Extol
- Frost Like Ashes
- Frosthardr
- Holy Blood
- Horde
- Lengsel
- Sanctifica
- Slechtvalk
- Vaakevandring

==== Christian rock groups ====
===== United States =====
- Ace Troubleshooter
- AD
- Adam Again
- After the Chase
- Allies
- Attack Attack!
- BarlowGirl
- Basehead
- Breakfast with Amy
- Building 429
- Casting Crowns
- Chagall Guevara
- Chasen
- Consider the Thief
- Crumbächer
- Dear Ephesus
- DecembeRadio
- Esterlyn
- Fair
- Fireflight
- Foolish Things
- Future of Forestry
- Harvest
- High Flight Society
- Inhabited
- Ivoryline
- Life in Your Way
- Lost Dogs
- Lost Ocean
- Love Coma
- Love Song
- Mad at the World
- Mikeschair
- Mind Garage
- Number One Gun
- PAX217
- Petra
- Pivitplex
- Plumb
- Poor Old Lu
- Prodigal
- Project 86
- Red
- Remedy Drive
- Run Kid Run
- Ruth
- Sevenglory
- Showbread
- Skillet
- Something Like Silas
- Spoken
- Squad Five-O
- Starflyer 59
- Stretch Arm Strong
- Sweet Comfort Band
- Switchfoot
- Tenth Avenue North
- The 77s
- The Ascendicate
- The Brothers Martin
- The Choir
- The Fold
- The Prayer Chain
- Thirty Pieces of Silver
- Twothirtyeight
- Watashi Wa
- Wavorly
- Widdlesworth
- Wrench in the Works

===== Canadian =====
- Article One
- Blessed by a Broken Heart
- Critical Mass
- Cry of the Afflicted
- Dakona
- Daniel Band
- Downhere
- Drentch
- Hokus Pick
- Kiros
- Manic Drive
- Means
- Newworldson
- Ocean
- Salvation Air Force
- Secret and Whisper
- Starfield
- The Kry
- 2nd Chapter of Acts
- 33Miles
- 38th Parallel

===== Miscellaneous and unclassified =====
- A Band Called David
- Above the Golden State
- Across the Sky
- Addison Road
- After Edmund
- Alisa
- All Together Separate
- Anberlin
- Audio Adrenaline
- Barnabas
- Barratt Band
- Beanbag
- Between the Trees
- Between Thieves
- Big Daddy Weave
- Big Dismal
- Big Fil
- Big Tent Revival
- Bleach
- Blind
- Brave Saint Saturn
- Burlap to Cashmere
- By the Tree
- Charizma
- Chasing Furies
- Code of Ethics
- Common Children
- Cool Hand Luke
- Crash Rickshaw
- Dakoda Motor Co.
- Dale Thompson
- Daniel Amos
- David and the Giants
- Day of Fire
- Dead Artist Syndrome
- Dead Poetic
- DeGarmo and Key
- Delirious?
- Desperation Band
- DigHayZoose
- Disperse
- Dizmas
- Echoing Angels
- Eden's Bridge
- Eleventyseven
- Ever Stays Red
- Everlife
- Everman
- Falling Up
- Family Force 5
- Farrell and Farrell
- Fee
- Fighting Instinct
- FM Static
- Fono
- Forever Changed
- Further Seems Forever
- Glowin' Moses
- Grammatrain
- Grey Holiday
- Guerilla Rodeo
- Halo
- Hillsong United
- House of Heroes
- Idle Cure
- Jars of Clay
- Jerusalem
- Johnny Q. Public
- Jonah33
- Justifide
- Legend Seven
- Liberation Suite
- Liberty N' Justice
- Lifehouse
- LVL
- Mainstay
- Mastedon
- MewithoutYou
- Monday Morning
- Mu5tard
- Nevertheless
- Newsboys
- Nickel Creek
- No Tagbacks
- Larry Norman
- Onehundredhours
- Out of the Grey
- Phil Keaggy
- Philmont
- Philmore
- Puller
- Quench
- Reality Check
- Resurrection Band
- Revive
- Rhubarb
- Rock Productions Music
- Rocketboy
- Salvador
- Sanctus Real
- Servant
- Seven Day Jesus
- Seven Places
- Shaded Red
- Silage
- Sixpence None the Richer
- Slingshot 57
- Smalltown Poets
- Split Level
- Staple
- Stavesacre
- StorySide:B
- Strange Celebrity
- Subseven
- Tait
- The Afters
- The Fray
- The Glorious Unseen
- The Listening
- The Myriad
- The Send
- The Swirling Eddies
- Third Day
- Three Crosses
- VOTA
- White Heart
- X-Sinner
- YFriday
- ZOEgirl

==== Christian pop groups ====
- Aurora
- Cadia
- FFH
- Jesus Loves You
- LaRue
- Leeland
- Point of Grace
- SHINEmk
- V*Enna
- Whisper Loud

==== Christian punk music groups ====
- Altar Boys
- Armia
- Ballydowse
- Blaster the Rocket Man
- Born Blind
- Children 18:3
- Craig's Brother
- Crashdog
- Dogwood (California band)
- Everyday Sunday
- Flatfoot 56
- Ghoti Hook
- Glen Meadmore
- Halo Friendlies
- Hawk Nelson
- Headnoise
- Jesse & The Rockers
- Last Tuesday
- Left Out
- Letter Kills
- Lifesavers Underground
- Lugnut
- Lust Control
- MxPx
- Ninety Pound Wuss
- Officer Negative
- Pocket Change
- Raft of Dead Monkeys
- Relient K
- Roper
- Scaterd Few
- Side Walk Slam
- Slick Shoes
- Spy Glass Blue
- Stellar Kart
- Superchick
- The Blamed
- The Deadlines
- The Huntingtons
- The Undecided
- The Wedding
- This Beautiful Republic
- Undercover

==== Christian ska groups ====
- The Insyderz
- Denver and the Mile High Orchestra
- Five Iron Frenzy
- Sonseed
- Sounds Like Chicken
- The Deluxtone Rockets
- The O.C. Supertones
- The W's

==== Miscellaneous and unclassified Christian music groups ====
===== United States =====
- 4Him
- Aaron Jeoffrey
- Acappella
- All Saved Freak Band
- All Star United
- Anointed
- ApologetiX
- The Archers
- Avalon
- AVB
- Bash-n-the-Code
- Bebo Norman
- Before Their Eyes
- Bethlehem
- Caedmon's Call
- Candle
- Cathedral Quartet
- Chandler
- Chasing Victory
- Children of the Day
- Chris and Conrad
- Christafari
- The Chuck Wagon Gang
- Cloud2Ground
- David Crowder Band
- Deitiphobia
- Delta-S
- Dime Store Prophets
- Dryve
- Eager
- Earthsuit
- East to West
- Echo Hollow
- The Echoing Green
- Ernie Haase & Signature Sound
- The Fairfield Four
- Gaither Vocal Band
- Gateway Worship
- Gentle Faith
- Ilia
- The Imperials
- The Innocence Mission
- Jacob's Trouble
- Jimmy Needham
- The Jordanaires
- Jump5
- Karen Peck and New River
- The Katinas
- Kingdom Heirs
- Kingsmen Quartet
- Koinonia
- Legacy Five
- Massivivid
- MercyMe
- Mercy's Mark Quartet
- Monk & Neagle
- My Brother's Mother
- NewSong
- Octappella
- PFR
- Phillips, Craig and Dean
- Plus One
- Pocket Full of Rocks
- PowerSource
- Psalm 150
- PureNRG
- A Ragamuffin Band
- Raze
- Rescue
- Roadside Monument
- Robbie Seay Band
- Rock n Roll Worship Circus
- Rush of Fools
- Selah
- Shane & Shane
- Sonicflood
- Speer Family
- Telecast
- Triumphant Quartet
- Waterdeep
- The Way
- Worth Dying for
- Yum Yum Children

===== Miscellaneous =====
- Aradhna
- The HiMiG Gospel Singers
- The Miscellaneous
- Zeichen der Zeit

===== Australia =====
- Alabaster Box
- Kindekrist
- Planetshakers

===== British =====
- After the Fire
- Fat and Frantic
- Iona
- The Joystrings
- Millennium Youth Choir
- Nutshell
- Phatfish
- The Tribe

===== Canadian =====
- Carried Away
- Deliverance
- Parker Trio

===== South African =====
- The Benjamin Gate
- Tree63

===== Swedish =====
- Edin-Ådahl
- Jerusalem
- Ultrabeat
- Walk on Water

== Christian publishers ==
=== Christian book publishers ===
- Abingdon Press
- American Christian Press
- Andrews University Press
- Augsburg Fortress
- Ave Maria Press
- Baker Publishing Group
- Banner of Truth Trust
- Baronius Press
- Benziger Brothers
- Bethany House
- BJU Press
- Bookcraft
- Brethren Missionary Herald Company (BMH)
- Burns & Oates
- Chick Publications Inc.
- Cluster Publications
- Committee of General Literature and Education
- Deseret Book
- DeVore & Sons Inc.
- Evangelical Christian Publishers Association
- Evangelical Press
- Gospel Light
- Grace Evangelical Society
- Harvest House
- Herald House
- Hodder & Stoughton
- Holman Bible Publishers
- Howard Books
- Inter-Varsity Press
- Lion Hudson
- Living Stream Ministry
- Lutterworth Press
- Mars Hill Audio
- Master Books
- Média-Participations
- Moody Publishers
- Nazarene Publishing House
- Northwestern Publishing House
- OMF International
- Orbis Books
- Pacific Press Publishing Association
- Paternoster Press
- Randall House Publications
- Regions Beyond Missionary Union
- Religious Tract Society
- Review and Herald Publishing Association
- Saint Austin Press
- Signs Publishing Company
- Society for Promoting Christian Knowledge
- TAN Books & Publishers
- Tate Publishing & Enterprises
- The Good Book Company
- Thomas Nelson
- Tyndale House
- Verlag Der Strom
- Walk Thru the Bible
- Westminster John Knox
- Whitaker House
- William B. Eerdmans Publishing Company
- Zondervan

=== Christian magazines, newspapers, and other periodicals ===
- 7ball
- America (magazine)
- Andrews University Seminary Studies
- The Briefing
- CCM Magazine
- The Children's Friend
- Charisma Magazine
- Chrismon
- The Christian Century
- Christian Marketplace
- The Christian Post
- The Christian Science Monitor
- Christianity Magazine
- Christianity Today
- Cornerstone
- Daerpies Dierie
- The Dawn
- Eternity
- English Churchman
- Evangelical Times
- FaithTalk
- Faithworks Magazine
- Focus
- Geist und Leben
- Gospel Advocate
- The Gospel Magazine
- Gospel Standard
- HM
- Homiletic and Pastoral Review
- House to House Heart to Heart
- Ignite Your Faith
- Investigate
- The Ladies' Repository
- Magazinet
- Ministry
- Monthly Repository
- National Catholic Reporter
- Needed Truth Magazine
- The New Creation
- New Man
- Nuestro Pan Diario
- Our Daily Bread
- Outreach Magazine
- Pastoral Bible Institute
- The Philadelphia Trumpet
- The Plain Truth
- Plugged In (publication)
- Present Truth Magazine
- The Progressive Christian
- Rays from the Rose Cross
- RBC Ministries
- Record
- Reform
- Relevant Magazine
- Salvo
- Send!
- Signs of the Times (Australia)
- Signs of the Times
- Singing News
- Sojourners Magazine
- Spectrum
- The Sword of the Lord
- The Vine
- Third Way Magazine
- THRIVE! News
- Touchstone Magazine
- True Tunes News
- Union of Catholic Asian News
- World
- Zeitschrift für die Alttestamentliche Wissenschaft
- Zeitschrift für die Neutestamentliche Wissenschaft

=== Miscellaneous and unclassified Christian publishers ===
- American Tract Society
- Carey Press
- Salem Publishing
- Koorong

=== Christian bookstores ===
- Adventist Book Center
- Berean Christian Stores
- Family Christian Stores
- Reformers Bookshop
