= Messenger =

Messenger, Messengers, The Messenger or The Messengers may refer to:

== People ==
- Courier, a person or company that delivers messages, packages, or mail
- Messenger (surname)
- Hermes, the messenger of the Greek gods and goddesses
- Bicycle messenger, a bicyclist who transports packages through cities
- Messenger-at-arms, an officer of the Scottish Court of Session
- Messenger of the Court, a court officer responsible for carrying communications and executing other orders
- Prophets and messengers in Islam
- Muhammad and other prophets in Islam, known as Messengers of Allah

== Science and technology ==
=== Biology and chemistry ===
- Chemical messenger (disambiguation), such as a hormone or neurotransmitter, a molecule used for cellular signalling
- Messenger RNA (mRNA), RNA that carries information from DNA to the ribosome sites of protein synthesis in a cell

=== Electronics and computing ===
- Instant messenger, a tool for online text communication
  - Facebook Messenger, an instant messaging service by Meta
  - Microsoft Messenger service, an instant messaging service by Microsoft
    - Windows Live Messenger, the client for said service, formerly named MSN Messenger
    - Windows Messenger, a predecessor of the above client
  - Yahoo Messenger, an instant messaging service by Yahoo!
- Windows Messenger service, a networking component of earlier versions of Microsoft Windows

=== Space exploration ===
- MESSENGER, a NASA probe to Mercury launched in 2004

== Transport ==
- Messenger cable, a continuous loop of cable or chain attached to a capstan used to raise the anchor cables on 17th–19th century sailing ships
- Miles Messenger, a British 1940s liaison aircraft
- Messenger (sternwheeler), an 1876 sternwheel steamboat of the Puget Sound Mosquito Fleet
- Verville-Sperry M-1 Messenger, 1921 American biplane
- Messenger (HBC vessel), operated by the HBC from 1897-1906; see Hudson's Bay Company vessels
- Renault Messenger, a commercial van

== Literature ==
- Messenger (novel), 2004, written by Lois Lowry
- The Messenger (Silva novel), 2006, by Daniel Silva
- The Messenger (Zusak novel), 2002, by Markus Zusak
- The Messenger, a 2001 fantasy novel by Douglas Niles

== Periodicals ==
- Fort Dodge Messenger, a newspaper printed in Fort Dodge, Iowa, US
- Messenger (magazine), a Mormon fundamentalist publication
- Messenger Newspapers, a group of newspapers in Adelaide, South Australia
- The Messenger (magazine), a monthly magazine associated with the Harlem Renaissance
- Messenger of the Sacred Heart, a Jesuit magazine published in Ireland
- The Missionary Messenger, a journal of the British Methodist Episcopal Church in Toronto, Canada
- The Messenger (Madisonville, Kentucky), a U.S. newspaper published in Madisonville, Kentucky
- The Messenger (Mount Airy, North Carolina), a U.S. newspaper published in Mount Airy, North Carolina
- Il Messaggero ("The Messenger"), a newspaper based in Rome, Italy
- Messenger, an American magazine published by the Church of the Brethren
- Messenger of Mathematics, a British mathematics journal published between 1872 and 1929, sometimes abbreviated as Messenger
- The Messenger, a quarterly astronomical journal published by the European Southern Observatory
- The Messenger (website), an American news website founded in 2023 and shut in 2024

== In film and television ==
- Mohammad, Messenger of God, a 1976 film directed by Moustapha Akkad
- The Messenger: The Story of Joan of Arc, a 1999 film directed by Luc Besson
- "Messenger", an episode of Power Rangers SPD
- The Messenger (1918 film), a film starring Oliver Hardy
- The Messenger (1937 film), directed by Raymond Rouleau
- The Messenger, a 1986 film directed by Fred Williamson
- The Messenger, an unfinished film by Sergei Bodrov Jr.
- Messengers, a 2004 drama film starring Michele Hicks
- The Messenger (2008 film), a film by Çağan Irmak
- The Messenger (2009 film), a film by Oren Moverman
- The Messenger (2015 British film), a horror film directed by David Blair
- The Messenger (2015 Canadian film), a documentary film directed by Su Rynard
- The Messenger (TV series), a 2023 Australian TV series based on the novel by Marcus Zusak
- The Messengers (film), 2007 horror film directed by the Pang Brothers
- The Messengers (TV series), a 2015 American television series
- MSG: The Messenger, a 2015 Indian action film by Gurmeet Ram Rahim Singh
  - MSG-2 The Messenger, sequel, released the same year
- "Messenger" (Andor), an episode of Andor

== In gaming ==
- Messenger (video game), 2025 browser game
- The Messenger (2000 video game), 2000 adventure game
- The Messenger (2018 video game), 2018 platform game developed by Sabotage

== In music ==
=== Groups ===
- The Messengers (producers), a musical songwriting and production duo
- The Messengers Choir, East African gospel group based in the US
- Paul Kelly and the Messengers, an Australian rock band, active 1987–1992
- Messengers (American band), an American Christian metal band
- Messengers (Scottish band)

=== Albums ===
- Messenger (Edwin McCain album), 1999
- Messenger (Jimmy Little album), 1999
- Messenger (Joe Pug album), 2010
- Messengers (album), 2007, by August Burns Red
- The Messenger (Ernest Dawkins album), 2006
- The Messenger (Casey Jones album), 2006
- The Messenger (Kurt Elling album), 1997
- The Messenger (Matt Joe Gow and the Dead Leaves album), 2009
- The Messenger (Johnny Marr album), 2013

=== Songs ===
- "The Messenger" (song), by Daniel Lanois
- "The Messenger", by Domine on their 2007 album Ancient Spirit Rising
- "The Messenger", by Linkin Park on their 2010 album A Thousand Suns
- "The Messenger", by Patrick Wolf on his 2009 album The Bachelor
- "Messenger", by Blonde Redhead on their 2004 album Misery Is a Butterfly
- "Messenger", by Paul McCartney on his 1997 album Standing Stone
- "Messengers", by Casiopea from Active, 1992
- "Messengers", by Lagwagon on their 1998 album Let's Talk About Feelings

=== Other uses in music ===
- Messenger Records, a record label
- The Messenger, a piano composition by Valentyn Sylvestrov

== Other uses ==
- Messenger (horse) (1780–1808), an English thoroughbred horse
- Messenger (Plymouth sculpture), a 2018 bronze statue of a female actor in Plymouth, England
- The Messenger (David Wynne sculpture), a 1981 bronze statue of a horse and rider in Sutton, London
- The Messenger (painting), 1674, by Johannes Verkolje

== See also ==
- Messenger bag, a type of bag often used by bicycle messengers
- Messenger Feast, a celebration of the Inupiaq and Yup'ik peoples of Alaska
- Rasul (disambiguation), Arabic for messenger
- قاصد (disambiguation), Arabic for messenger
