= Christian mass media =

Christian mass media refers to mass media that is Christian, or refers to various aspects of mass media which primarily target the Christian demographic. As a genre its conventions originated in sermons, literature, and gospel music, and it has been adapted into film, radio, video games, and contemporary music.

== Christian literature ==
Christian books, a segment of Christian media which typically communicate the core elements of the Christian faith to non-believers, or publishes books to help develop and inform the beliefs of adherents. Examples include Gospel Light, whose focus is on Children's Christian Education, Plough Publishing, Concordia Publishing House and David C. Cook. Some traditional Christian publishers are converting to online publishing. As evangelical traditions do not have a central authority, publishers and bookstores are de facto gatekeepers of theology.

Christian literature is a vast and diverse body of writing that includes various genres and forms. While the Bible itself is not typically considered literature, it is highly regarded for its literary qualities, especially in the King James Version. Christian devotional literature focuses on helping individuals strengthen their faith and relationship with God.

Christian non-fiction includes theological works, letters, and biblical commentaries, with a long history dating back to early Christian times. Allegory has been a prominent literary form, using symbolic stories to convey Christian truths, seen in works like The Divine Comedy and The Pilgrim's Progress.

Christian fiction, which may not always have explicit Christian themes, became more distinct in recent decades, especially within a conservative Evangelical subculture. It is often marketed to Christians and includes works by authors like Tim LaHaye, Frank Peretti, and Francine Rivers. The genre has also diversified into niche markets, such as Catholic fiction, Mormon fiction, and Mennonite literature.

Christian poetry and theatre, including medieval mystery plays and modern evangelical theatre, also contribute to the literary tradition. Additionally, Christianity & Literature is a scholarly journal that explores the relationship between literature and Christian thought.

Notable Christian literary works span from ancient texts like the Bible to modern writings such as The Chronicles of Narnia and The Last Temptation of Christ. Many of these works, such as Paradise Lost by John Milton and The Pilgrim's Progress by John Bunyan, have had a lasting impact on literature and culture.

== Forms of Christian media ==
=== Audiovisual media ===
- Christian film is a film genre. Many forms of Christian films are now widespread, from full length, feature films to short and discussion orientated clips. Modern streaming services such as Netflix and Amazon Prime Video have productions in the format, and some like Great American Pure Flix focus on it in particular.
- Christian graphic novels, comics and animation blend visual storytelling with faith-based themes, often influencing broader media. This includes Davey and Goliath, Superbook, and VeggieTales. These series inspired writer Len Uhley, who highlighted faith in X-Men Nightcrawler and Wolverine. The Gospel According to Peanuts by Robert L. Short explores Christian themes in Peanuts, notably in A Charlie Brown Christmas, where Linus quotes the annunciation to the shepherds. Others include Spire Christian Comics, a 1972–1982 Baker Publishing Group and Archie Comics spin-off, featured characters like Archie Andrews in Christian narratives. Marvel Comics partnered with Thomas Nelson in the 1990s to adapt The Screwtape Letters, The Pilgrim’s Progress, and create the superhero Illuminator.
- Christian radio, a radio format of music and programming that, within itself, includes several sub-formats. These include Contemporary Christian music, Urban contemporary gospel, Southern Gospel, inspirational music, children's programming which include Adventures in Odyssey and Patch the Pirate, talk radio, and formats which include primarily preaching and/or instructional programming.
- Christian television, which may include broadcast television or cable television channels whose entire broadcast programming schedule is television programs directly related to Christianity, such as Trinity Broadcasting Network and Christian Broadcasting Network (the world's largest religious television networks), or individual shows including televangelism, comedy, action, drama, reality, dramatizations and variety shows, movies and mini-series; which are part of the overall programming of a general-interest television station. It includes popular television programs like The Chosen and House of David.
- Christian video games are generally released by independent Christian developers, though sometimes a major company develops a game targeted at this audience.

=== Christian publishing ===
Christian publishing encompasses all forms of publishing of print media and digital media:

- Christian studios and publishers can include those covering a specifically Christian worldview, or even those intended for general audiences such as The Christian Science Monitor. They produce a wide range of media, spanning independent companies to mainstream multimedia giants. Publishers include Zondervan and LifeWay Christian Resources, which focus on books and resources, alongside denominational outlets like the America and Amazing Facts. Christian media reaches audiences through retailers like Walmart, Amazon, and Tencent, and companies like Chick-fil-A and In-N-Out Burger. It is very common for Christian devotional literature to feature various Christian creatives, studios, and media franchises by offering themed lesson plans, this can also include daily devotionals, Bible studies, and devotional Bibles.
- Christian media franchises are across various platforms, often evolving from single works into expansive properties. Early radio dramas like Family Theater and Adventures in Odyssey made the first ventures into pop-up exhibitions beyond just radio. Superbook, a 1981 anime by Tatsunoko Production for CBN; it was rebooted in 2011 with voices like Sam Vincent. VeggieTales, starting as direct-to-video, expanded into multimedia like books and games along with spin-offs Jonah: A VeggieTales Movie, Netflix series VeggieTales in the House and VeggieTales in the City, and The VeggieTales Show. Bibleman, a 1995 superhero series, includes live-action, an animated reboot, and tie-ins. Duck Commander inspired Duck Dynasty, spin-offs, podcasts, and books by the Robertson family. The Chosen, a crowdfunded series by Dallas Jenkins, explores Jesus’ life and has been adapted into novels.
- Christian newspapers, a small segment of Christian media which typically communicates news to members of the denomination or group which publishes the paper. Such newspapers often published weekly, rarely more frequently and often less frequently (bi-weekly, monthly). Examples include the Methodist Church of Great Britain's Methodist Recorder and the Southern Baptist Convention, whose various state conventions often publish weekly or bi-weekly newspapers, also Christian Examiner and The Christian Post. Sometimes individual congregations will publish newspapers; one example is Southeast Christian Church, a megachurch in Louisville, Kentucky which publishes a weekly newspaper distributed throughout the metro area. Independent publishers have also produced Christian newspapers, often aimed at a specific group such as Roman Catholics. The Second Vatican Council's Decree on the Media of Social Communications (1963) sought to establish and promote "a truly Catholic press" with "the clear purpose of forming, supporting and advancing public opinion in accord with natural law and Catholic teaching and precepts". The decree noted that the Catholic "ecclesiastical authorities" could have a role in directing its development; alternatively, Catholic lay-people could take this role. In either case, the decree also sought to encourage people to inform their judgment by reading Catholic publications. For much the same reasons as commercial newspapers such as the high cost of production and distribution, some Christian newspapers are converting to online publishing.
- Christian magazines are one of many special-interest groups within the magazine publishing industry. Christian magazines often focus on groups within Christianity, such as men or women, youth, or certain denominations. Many Christian magazines are published by denominations and independent ministries as an outreach to the unchurched or to the organization's supporters, frequently at no cost to the reader. One of the most well known is "Guideposts" magazine, published by Guideposts non-profit since 1945. Examples of denominational magazines include House to House Heart to Heart. Other Christian magazines are published commercially for a profit, and sold by subscription or by single copies through bookstores and other retailers. Examples include Christianity Today, Charisma, and Relevant.

== See also ==
- List of Christian media organizations
