= Even Now =

Even Now may refer to:

== Albums ==
- Even Now (Barry Manilow album) 1978
- Even Now, Nana Mouskouri 1979
- Even Now (Conway Twitty album), 1991
- Even Now (EP), an EP by Natalie LaRue
- Even Now (Foolish Things album)

== Songs ==
- "Even Now" (Barry Manilow song), 1978
- "Even Now" (Bob Seger song), 1983
- "Even Now" (Exile song), 1991
- "Even Now", by Sara Evans from Three Chords and the Truth, 1997
