= Needed Truth Brethren =

Needed Truth Brethren (or Churches of God)
- Classification: Protestant
- Orientation: Plymouth Brethren
- Polity: connexional
- Origin: 1892
- Separated from: Open Brethren

Needed Truth Brethren, as they are sometimes known, call themselves “The Churches of God in the Fellowship of the Son of God, the Lord Jesus Christ". Although this is their official legal title, other Christians often classify them as a very conservative strain of the Plymouth Brethren, connexional in nature, and holding themselves separate from what they consider to be erroneous practices. The designation "Needed Truth" was given to them by others based on the Needed Truth Magazine, which began to be distributed among the Open Brethren in 1888. This magazine espoused what it considers a fresh understanding of biblical teaching of the proper constitution of the local church, principles of church government, and doctrinal subjects such as The House of God, the Church of God, the Kingdom of God, and the Body of Christ. The magazine presented these views as being a return to fundamental New Testament principles which had been forgotten. (The Plymouth Brethren movement as a whole had, from the beginning, seen itself as practicing a return to fundamental New Testament principles which denominational organizations had lost sight of.)

== History of the Churches of God ==
The Churches of God (Needed Truth Brethren) seceded from the Open Brethren around 1892 ("The Separation"), as a result of the ideas propagated in the Needed Truth magazine finding acceptance in some Open Brethren circles, but not all. This division: 1) put into effect what they considered to be a clearer biblical understanding of the different usages of the term 'church' as found in the New Testament (specifically differentiating between local gatherings of faithful disciples and the overall spiritual entity known as the Church which is Christ's Body); 2) took adherence to the Apostles Teaching as the ground of gathering (as opposed to the simple possession of common life in Christ); and 3) established a system of church governance between the local churches which featured local elders consulting together (as an elderhood) across the entire community of churches, maintaining unity of teaching and practice throughout (something they saw to be manifestly lacking among the Open Brethren).

Although a minority of the Open Brethren assemblies officially separated and joined the Needed Truth movement, their literature continued to influence many of the "Gospel Hall Brethren", who tended to be more conservative than many of their fellow-Brethren.

== Doctrine and structure ==
The Needed Truth Brethren teach that the basis of reception to local assembly fellowship is faithful adherence to the Apostles Teaching as defined in the New Testament, as opposed to the One Body basis of reception taught by Open Brethren - especially the Bible Chapel Brethren. Their basic doctrine regarding the functioning of the local church can be viewed as summarized in Acts 2:41 - 42, which is seen by them as consistent with all other New Testament teaching. They understand that there is only one church of God in any particular city where such exists, and that the weekly Christian ordinance of the breaking of bread in remembrance of the Lord is a function of that one church (albeit there may be multiple companies of that one recognized church which each break bread). According to their teaching, two or three believers gathered together informally or temporarily, but not as a scripturally designated gathering of the local church, do not by themselves constitute a church, and so it is inappropriate for them to attempt to fulfil the functions of a church of God (they can of course meet for prayer and to carry out the procedures described in Mat.18).

Their assemblies, unlike Open Brethren assemblies, are not independent and autonomous, but are interdependent, with discipline being enforced movement-wide. In an Open Brethren meeting someone under discipline might manage to join another open assembly. Dissatisfaction with such loose practice led to the separation. Needed Truth Brethren hold that there is only one Church of God in any city or district.

== Needed Truth influence on Gospel Halls ==
The Gospel Hall Brethren movement spread out from the work in Scotland after the Revival of 1859. Evangelists like Alexander Marshall and Donald Ross did much work in spreading the gospel, and starting assemblies. Many of the Gospel Halls in Canada were pioneered by these Scottish evangelists.

Initially, Donald Ross, a close friend of Duncan Matheson, did not hold to the Needed Truth teaching that reception was the to local Assembly. But after Matheson's death, Ross began to hold this. This teaching became the basis of fellowship and reception in many Gospel Halls, yet they never joined with the assemblies who separated out as Needed Truth Brethren.

Alexander Marshall broke with the Needed Truth movement early on, over their insistence that any two or three gathered together could not be called an assembly, and could not break bread together. Marshall believed that, "Where two or three are, having been gathered together in my name, there am I in the midst of them" was sufficient proof that, in his opinion, the Needed Truth brethren were not following the New Testament Pattern. The Needed Truth brethren countered that this was an inaccurate appreciation of the context of these verses and continued to assert that only gatherings connected to an already existing assembly could be considered an assembly. Informal gatherings were not recognized as being the Lord's Table. Disciples were seen to be joined together in a fellowship in which they were to continue steadfastly. This showed its conditional aspect, and precluded any such thing as casual fellowship. From 1 Corinthians 5 they held that a believer could be excommunicated from such a local church of God as that at Corinth; whereas he could never lose his place in the Church which is Christ's Body.

In their scriptural searches, many brethren came to the view that interdependency between churches is taught in the New Testament. Provincial and wider groupings of churches are mentioned in Galatians 1:2 and 1 Peter 1:1. Paul taught the same doctrine throughout all the churches (1 Cor. 1:2; 7:17). As to their principle of government, it was understood from Acts 15 that cohesion among the local churches of God was maintained by a united elderhood. Thus the churches collectively were one house; the house of God. All this answers to the Old Testament which provided in practice for the consultation of city elders in judgement (Deut. 19:12), and in type provided for the linking of tabernacle curtains, so that the tabernacle was one (Ex. 26:6).

As this Needed Truth teaching gained influence in Gospel Halls in the period 1892–1896, many left their former association with the Brethren Movement. Their vision then was of a fellowship of churches, comprising disciples who had been baptized by immersion, gathered together in obedience to the Word of God, separated to God from worldly associations, and who were under the leadership of God-appointed elders.

== Scandals ==
The Needed Truth Brethren have had to deal with scandals involving many of the same problems faced by other churches, such as pedophilia, divided families, women's rights, excommunication for allegedly non-biblical reasons, and issues of leadership such as power and control. In claiming to deal scripturally with these difficult issues, the church has lost followers in some places while growing in others — notably in the developing world.

The Churches of God believe from their interpretation of Scripture that those in the churches should "marry only in the Lord". Those marrying a Christian outside of the Needed Truth movement were previously excommunicated. More recently, the churches, while re-affirming that the people of God should marry only the people of God, stated that in any breach of this, they would discriminate between rebellion and weakness of faith, and only excommunicate where a spirit of rebellion in going against the counsel of Scripture was evident.

== Separation ==
The official position of the Churches of God is that they believe that they exclusively form the House of God on earth. The Needed Truth Brethren hold to the biblical doctrine of separation as per 2 Thes.3:6 etc. Throughout the history of the continuing Reformation through ‘the Brethren Movement’ and on into Churches of God, separation from error was essential at each stage. The only way to perpetuate biblical truth, they believe, is to separate it from all error and compromise: it cannot be perpetuated through compromise, and compromise cannot be avoided without separation.
