= Allen Webster =

Allen Webster may refer to:

- Allen Webster (baseball) (born 1990), baseball pitcher
- Allen Webster, editor of magazine House to House Heart to Heart

== See also ==
- Alan Webster (disambiguation)
