= Daily Bread =

Daily Bread may refer to:

- Daily Bread (Charles Gayle album), 1998
- Daily Bread (Corey Harris album), 2005
- Daily Bread Co-operative, an English Christian workers' co-operative
- Daily Bread Food Bank, a Canadian non-denominational Christian charity organization

== See also ==
- Our Daily Bread (disambiguation)
- "Give us this day our daily bread", from the Lord's Prayer
- Epiousios, an adjective applied to "bread" in the Lord's prayer and usually translated as "daily"
