= J. J. Rouse =

John James Rouse (1869–1951) was a Canadian Plymouth Brethren evangelist, associated with early Canadian Gospel Hall Assemblies.

== Early years ==
He was born May 15, 1869, on a farm in the township of Oro, Simcoe County, Ontario, Canada. In his early years, Rouse claims his life was a testimony to the truth of Romans 3:16, "Destruction and misery are in their ways." He gave examples such as deliberately tearing his brother's coat in stripes; being sent with a basket of eggs to the store, and on the way seeing a stump which he used as a target to throw the eggs against; breaking the windows in his father's cow stable.

In his early teens, Rouse joined a gang of boys who blocked the door of the Presbyterian church, sermon in progress, using wheels from the hay-rakes found in front of the blacksmith's shop. These they packed into the church porch so that the only way the congregation could get out was through the windows. Then they tampered with their buggies so that the occupants would be thrown out on their way home from the meeting.

They would scare people by hiding out in the Knox Church cemetery at night with a ball of lamp-wick wrapped and sewn, soaked in coal-oil. They would put on leather mittens and toss the lighted ball back and forth, putting the fear of ghosts into their superstitious neighbours.

The climax of their antics came when Alexander Marshall, Dr. James Law, and Dr. J. N. Case had pitched a gospel tent across from his farm. One night, Rouse's gang led an old horse up to the tent, and pushed its head inside the door. Then they put a bull thistle under his tail, causing the horse to plunge into the tent, creating havoc and spoiling the meeting for the night.

== Conversion ==
As Rouse contemplated eternity, he became fearful of death and judgement. He tried to be good, and attended Methodist church meetings, thinking this would get him to heaven. He went to Sunday School in the Sons of Temperance hall where he memorized whole chapters and whole books of the Bible. But still, he had no assurance of salvation. On several occasions he had close calls, where he was sure he would die. On one such occasion, in March 1885 he had a close call while turning the horses around in the snow and brush of a wood. Fearing death, he cried out, "Oh, God, I'm lost, there's no use of me trying to be good." He got the wood on, and was on his way home, when he saw that, according to Romans 5:6, "Christ died for the ungodly," and he remembered that moment as the time where he "passed from death unto life."

After his conversion, Rouse joined the Congregational church where his parents were members. He was very active in the church for nine or ten years. Shortly after, he aspired to become a missionary to Africa, through hearing the Congregational missionary, John Curry, tell of the work there.

Rouse's sister joined the Marshallites, which was the nickname they gave to the assembly of Alexander Marshall, who was the first to preach there. These "Marshallites" met at a Gospel Hall about four miles from the village of Rugby where the Rouses lived. Rouse had no interest in meeting with these people, and passed remarks about them as, "Poor silly few, they have no minister, they just go in there to sit and look at one another."

== College ==
While attending college to become a Congregational minister, on a Saturday in the autumn of 1893 he walked along the main street of town and heard the singing of a hymn in an upstairs hall. He wondered what it was about, and went up to investigate. He found it to be a conference of Christians. He went to the meeting the next morning (Sunday), where Donald Munro spoke for an hour. In the course of this meeting, Mr. Munro gave ministry, and preached the Gospel. Munro mentioned that he had first been under the reins of a Congregational minister for four years after being saved. This remark irritated Rouse, who spoke of it in anger to another young man after the meeting. He was surprised that Munro was listening in on the conversation. Rouse relayed the incident thus:

"Mr. Munro, in a very gentle way, and his gentleness seemed in a measure to subdue me, laid his hand upon my shoulder and said, 'My dear young man, there is one thing I would like you to do.' I replied by saying, 'if it is within reason I will do it.' Then he requested me to go home, and take my Bible and concordance, and see if I could find one place in the Word of God where it spoke about one man being set over a body of people, exercising the gifts of evangelist, pastor, and teacher, and receiving a salary. Having been brought up in the traditions of the church, I most assuredly believed I could find it."

He went home and searched, and wrote years later, "I found it only condemned me, and now forty-three years have passed and I have not found it yet; for the simple reason it is not in the Word of God." This had given him great distress as he had been planning on becoming a Congregational minister.

He chose to compromise, and he joined the Baptists for a while. But he realized they had a sectarian name, and a paid minister. He determined he would go to Moody Bible Institute, which was non-denominational. But he became ill. He believed the illness was sent by God to keep him from going to Moody, and to learn to be subdued by the Lord, and to obey.

== In the Fellowship ==
On Saturday, July 6, 1895, Rouse went into Orillia to seek the fellowship of Gospel Hall Brethren. But when he arrived in Orillia, he discovered that they had left that day with a Bible carriage for Midland. So he boarded a train, went to Midland, where he found the Orillia Brethren. They took him down to Georgian Bay where he was then baptized, Saturday evening, July 6, 1895. The next morning, he went with two of the Brethren to the meeting in Waverly. He was interviewed by the elder Brethren, and "had the privilege for the first time of breaking the bread and drinking the wine in memory of the broken body, and poured out blood of our Lord Jesus Christ." That night, he took part in the Gospel meeting. He preached on the texts, "For the wages of sin is death, but the gift of God is eternal life, through Jesus Christ our Lord" (Romans 6:23), and "Lust when it hath conceived bringeth forth sin, and sin when it is finished bringeth forth death" (James 1:15).

The next night, back in Midland, Rouse told how he was saved, and immediately left on a tour through towns and villages with the Bible carriage.

== Early work ==
In the summer of 1895, Rouse entered "God's College" for preachers. This consisted of studying the Bible and working with the brethren as they travelled about with the Gospel.
