= Canaan Gents =

Ugandan Acapella Vocal Band

- Origin: Uganda
- Genres: Acapella
- Years active: 2015-present
- Labels: Canaan Gents
- Members: Geofrey Elvin Amanyire; Samuel Lubwama; Wasswa Elijah Kissiti; Kato Elisha Kissiti
- Past members: Charles Sentongo; Samuel Baker
- Website: https://canaangents.com/

Canaan Gents is a Ugandan Acapella Vocal Band composed of Geofrey Elvin Amanyire, Samuel Lubwama, Wasswa Elijah Kissiti and Kato Elisha Kissiti.

== History ==
Canaan Gents began 30 November 2011 with Samuel Lubwama, Victor Tusiimire, Kevin Kiggundu, Aijuka Rodney and Nsereko Derrick while at Uganda Christian University, Mukono.

The Canaan Gents have songs like "Nkwagala" and "Azaaliddwa".

== Themes ==
The music of Canaan Gents addresses themes relating to gospel songs.

== Awards ==
Canaan Gents has been previously nominated in various awards such as in HiPipo Music Awards.
