= Our Daily Bread =

Our Daily Bread, usually an allusion to the phrase "Give us this day our daily bread" from the Lord's Prayer, may also refer to:

== Films ==
- Our Daily Bread (1926 film), a German silent drama film
- Our Daily Bread (1929 film), or The Shadow of a Mine, a silent German film
- Our Daily Bread (1934 film), an American drama film
- Our Daily Bread (1949 film), an East German film
- Our Daily Bread (2005 film), a documentary film

== Other uses ==
- Our Daily Bread (devotional), a devotional calendar-style booklet published by Our Daily Bread Ministries
  - Nuestro Pan Diario, the Spanish-language version
- Our Daily Bread, an 1886 watercolour by Anders Zorn
- Our Daily Bread (album), a 2023 album by Joe Lovano
- Our Daily Bread, a 1928 novel by Frederick Philip Grove

== See also ==
- Epiousios, the word usually translated "daily" in the phrase
- Daily Bread (disambiguation)
