= Everman =

Everman can refer to:

- Jason Everman, musician
- Seth Everman, YouTuber and musician
- Everman, Texas
- Everman (band)
- Berem, The Everman, a character in the Dragonlance series.
