= Robin Mann (musician) =

- Born: 1949 (age 75–76); South Australia
- Genres: Christian rock
- Occupation: Teacher
- Years active: 1969–present
- Website: www.robinmann.com.au

Robin Mann (born 1949) is an Australian Christian singer, songwriter and theologian. His career started in 1969 with Kindekrist. Mann's music is distinctly Australian, and much of it is written to be easily sung by congregations. His music has been published in many Christian music books, including the All Together Now series and Together in Song.

Mann was awarded an honorary Doctor of Divinity by the Australian Lutheran College in 2019.
