= Alan Webster =

Alan or Allan Webster may refer to:

- Alan Webster (rower) (born 1941), former New Zealand rower
- Alan Robert Webster (born 1966), British paedophile prisoner
- Alan Webster (priest) (1918–2007), Anglican priest and dean
- Allan Ross Webster, Canadian politician

== See also ==
- Allen Webster (disambiguation)
