= The Sound Show =

The Sound Show (aka The Sound Louisville) is a nationally syndicated Christian music talent reality TV show that was launched in 2014, and is shot around the Louisville, Kentucky area. It features host Lindsey Hansen and has alternating co-host from season to season. The show has also featured many guest performers including Dove Award winner and Grammy nominee Jayson Clayborn and Miss Kentucky 2016-2017 Laura Jones, Point of Grace members, and others.

== Seasons ==
=== Season 1 ===
The first season was filmed and distributed on WBNA, including a taped announcement of the winner. This season was shot at the Louisville Mega Caverns, and featured 20 undiscovered soloists in a 6-week singing competition; the winner was given a trip to Florida and time in studio with a producer.

=== Season 2 ===
In 2015 the show changed to a winter season of 6 episodes and moved to The St. Matthews Mall in Louisville, KY. The same format of 4 judges and text-at-home voting was used to decide on a winner over the 6 weeks, but the prize package now included a recording contract and radio play on 88.5 FM WJIE. Erika Gaines won this season; she recorded a song entitled Handle it with Prayer.

=== Season 3 ===
Season 3 returned to the same location, but was cut to 20 contestants in 5 weeks; it was taped in the fall of 2016 using the same format and its winner was Victoria Hiegel; her entry was called My Hope is in the Lord. A contract was also offered to Ryan Lynton, the runner-up and the person who recorded Made For His Glory. At the end of the season, the show was offered national syndication on a Christian media station and is planning to begin with the Fall 2017 launch of Season 4.

=== Season 4 ===
Season 4 will begin filming in October 2017 and will run for 6 weeks. Season 3 and 4 also feature coaching from head coaches Paul Meadows and Lesley McFerron along with special celebrity coaches. Season 4 has a partnership with Centricity Music of Nashville as the record label working with the winner of season 4. It also marks the first time the show is broadcast across the country on CTN, IBN and more.
