= Let's Not Forget the Story =

Studio album by Foolish Things
- Released: July 18, 2006
- Genre: Rock, alternative rock, Christian rock
- Length: 46:01
- Label: Inpop
- Producer: Jason Houser, Foolish Things

Foolish Things chronology
Let's Not Forget the Story (2006)	Even Now (2008)

Professional ratings
Review scores
Source	Rating
AllMusic	3/5 stars
Jesus Freak Hideout	3.5/5 stars

Let's Not Forget the Story is the debut album of Colorado worship band, Foolish Things.

== Track listing ==
1. "Who Can Compare" - 4:26 (Jorgensen)
2. "Spirit Come" - 3:29 (Jorgensen, Labriola)
3. "Be Still" - 3:10 (Labriola)
4. "Find Your Way Back" - 4:37 (Jorgensen)
5. "The First Lie" - 5:16 (Jorgensen)
6. "Hey You" - 3:02 (Labriola)
7. "Capitol P" - 3:09 (Labriola)
8. "This Love" - 3:53 (Jorgensen)
9. "Can't Believe" - 5:20 (Jorgensen)
10. "It's Not Home" - 4:46 (Jorgensen)
11. "Forgive Me" - 4:49 (Jorgensen)

== Personnel ==
- Mark Labriola II - vocals, background vocals, programming
- Isaac Jorgensen - vocals, background vocals, programming, piano, acoustic guitar, electric guitar
- Nate Phillips - bass guitar
- James Rightmer - background vocals, programming, piano, keyboards, electric guitar
- Shaul Hagen - drums
