= Keith Lancaster =

American singer, songwriter and music executive

Keith Lancaster is a singer, songwriter, composer, producer and executive at The Acappella Company.

In 1982, Lancaster began pursuit of his dream to spread the Gospel through a cappella music by creating Acappella Ministries in his hometown of Paris, Tennessee. Through this ministry, a quartet was formed, that ultimately became known as the musical group Acappella.

Acappella released its first album with the original name of His Image quartet in 1982, produced by Lancaster, who also sang lead. Acappella released several more albums through The Acappella Company before Lancaster stepped back from an on-stage role in 1988, to dedicate his time to song writing and production for the group. Al Pratt, who MC'd the 1994 Christian Acappella Music Awards credited Acappella and Boyz II Men with taking Christian a capella music "to a mainstream level."

In 1986, Lancaster put together the vocal group Acappella Vocal Band (AVB) to augment the ministry of Acappella. By this time, both groups began recording and performing primarily original music, much of which was composed by Lancaster. Each group took a unique focus to spread the appeal of the ministry. Acappella focused on adult contemporary, while AVB was geared towards a more youthful market.

The ministry Lancaster founded also formed The Acappella Company, which serves as an umbrella organization for all of his related projects, such as Praise And Harmony, Acappella, AVB, The Vocal Union and Durant.

Lancaster continues to produce various projects, work as a worship minister at the Cullman Church of Christ in Cullman, Alabama, and is heavily involved with The Acappella Company's leadership, but is now focusing on traveling the world and presenting his "Praise & Harmony Workshops" at various churches who want to improve their singing and worship.

Lancaster is married to Sharon, and has four children (Melissa, Kimberly, Anthony, and Allison) who are actively involved in the work of The Acappella Company's vocal bands.

Lancaster was honored with the A Cappella Music Award for "Lifetime Achievement" on May 19, 2018.
