= Needed Truth =

Needed Truth is a Christian, Plymouth Brethren magazine that first appeared in 1888 in Scotland. The magazine discussed whether reception was to the Lord's Table, or if reception was to the assembly itself. This distinction had implications whether a believer from other evangelical churches could occasionally meet with the saints in a New Testament assembly. The publication of the magazine crystallised the two sides of the argument to such an extent that within five years they ceased to be in intercommunion.

Eventually, several assemblies who subscribed to the ideas of Needed Truth magazine separated out into what some called Needed Truth Brethren ("The Separation"). There are currently over 100 of these assemblies still in existence around the world in the UK, USA, Canada, Burma, India, Nigeria, Ghana, Malawi, Australia, Jamaica, Belgium (although they designate themselves as the "Church and Churches of God"). They operate a website. Needed Truth magazine still exists, and in 2008 was revamped into an A4 full colour format with a new title – NT. It now features regular testimonies and interviews with people actively involved in Christian work alongside its historic mix of articles on the person and work of Christ, Christian living, the context of Bible times, prophecy, and the relationship between assemblies.

The ideas in the magazine also influenced many assemblies that did not separate, in that they eventually took on Needed Truth teaching and formed another sub-sect, the Gospel Hall Brethren.
