= After the Chase =

American Christian rock band (founded 2003)

- Origin: Petaluma, California, United States
- Genres: Singer-songwriter, contemporary Christian music, Christian rock
- Years active: 2003–present
- Labels: Indie
- Members: Nathan Strong; Jenna Strong; Gary Huntsman; Matthew Nalywaiko
- Past members: Jack Pryor; Gary Albright
- Website: www.afterthechase.com

After the Chase is an American Christian acoustic rock band. The band was founded in 2003 by husband and wife duo Nathan and Jenna Strong in Petaluma, California. Current members of the band include drummer and percussionist Gary Huntsman, and bass player Matthew Nalywaiko.

== Musical career ==
Nathan and Jenna started playing together in local coffee shops and churches in northern California. In March 2004, they released their first album, self-titled After the Chase. They began touring across the country, with no recording contract, playing their songs wherever and whenever they could. They released their first radio single "Run" from this album.

Their second album Make Me New was released in March 2008, and received many favorable reviews. Produced by Nate Sabin (who has produced albums for Sara Groves, Jason Gray and others) the album featured musicians such as Steve Brewster (drums), George Cocchini (electric guitar), Jeff Roach (keyboards), Matt Patrick, Phil Madeira, Aaron Fabbrini, Nate Sabin, Matt Pierson (bass), Marc Anderson (percussion), Staci Frenes (backing vocals), Lori Sabin (backing vocals), John Catchings (strings) and Faith Miller (violin).

This album is unique in Christian music in that it features several waterphone parts, played by Jenna Strong.

It featured several singles, including "Make Me New", and "I'll be a Fool". "I'll be a Fool" briefly charted in the CRW top 30 Inspo/Soft AC category in late 2008.

Their third album, You Are My Child was released in June 2011. Another album of all original material, it was produced by Mitch Dane, and featured guitar tracks played by Steve Mason of Jars of Clay, as well as Matt Pierson returning on the bass.

== Discography ==
=== Albums ===
Year	Album	Label	Review(s)
2004	After the Chase	Independent	Cross Rhythms link
2008	Make Me New	Independent	Cross Rhythms link; Christianity Today link; Faithvine (positive) link
2011	You Are My Child	Independent	Jesus Freak Hideout (mixed) link
