= Illuminator (Marvel Comics) =

Publication information
- Publisher: Marvel Comics; Thomas Nelson
- First appearance: Illuminator #1 (1993)
- Created by: Glenn Herdling; Craig Brasfield

In-story information
- Alter ego: Andrew Prentiss
- Partnerships: God
- Notable aliases: Andy, Drew, Ghost of Christmas Yet to Come, Light-Boy, Light Creature, Spirit of the Crystals
- Abilities: Divine powers; luminescence, flight, healing, afterimage, super strength, and durability

Illuminator is a fictional Christian superhero appearing in American comic books published by Marvel Comics, which debuted during a collaboration with Thomas Nelson. The character has starred in self-titled limited series comics during 1993, released along with Marvel Comics adaptions of the story of Easter, In His Steps, The Screwtape Letters, and The Pilgrim's Progress.

== Fictional character biography ==
The character's alter ego is Andrew Prentiss a student and citizen scientist from Fairview, Tennessee, part of Nashville. During a night at summer camp a light envelops him, it gives him the power of flight, luminescence, and durability. He initially assumes the powers must have been granted by extraterrestrials, but after returning home he saves himself and his brother from a demonic possessed man, and an elderly biker named Gus who witnessed the ordeal recognizes the powers as being divine in nature. His powers are dependent on his Christian faith, which is depicted through his luminescence, and he uses his powers to combat demonic villains. He is one of the Marvel Universe's Earth-616 human mutate characters.

== Publication history ==
- Herdling, Glenn; Brasfield, E. Craig; Jones, J. B.; Turner, Frank; Mossoff, Sarra; Starkings, Richard (1993). Illuminator #1. New York, NY: Marvel Comics. ISBN 0-8407-6979-2. OCLC 28278042.
- Herdling, Glenn; Brasfield, E. Craig; Jones, J. B.; Turner, Frank; Mossoff, Sarra; Starkings, Richard (1993). Illuminator #2. New York, NY: Marvel Comics. ISBN 0-8407-7807-4.
- Herdling, Glenn; Brasfield, E. Craig; Jones, J. B.; Turner, Frank; Mossoff, Sarra; Starkings, Richard (1993). Illuminator #3. New York, NY: Marvel Comics. ISBN 0-8407-6253-4. OCLC 948364807.
