= Messenger (video game) =

2025 browser game

- Developers: Vicente Lucendo, Michael Sungaila
- Publisher: Abeto
- Composer: Kevin Colombin
- Platform: Browser
- Release: WW: 25 September 2025
- Genre: Adventure
- Mode: Multiplayer

Messenger is a 2025 browser game developed by Vicente Lucendo and Michael Sungaila, and published by Abeto. It follows a young mail carrier who delivers parcels and letters around a small planet, and has multiplayer elements where players can see each other and communicate through emojis. Critics praised its level of detail and art style.

== Gameplay ==
The player character of Messenger is a young mail carrier that delivers parcels and letters around a very small alien planet. Possible deliveries include a worker sending an incensed letter to his boss, who finds the letter amusing, and a bald man who receives a letter from his past self telling him to take care of his hair. Environments in the game include a power plant, a forest, and a city. Other players are visible and can be communicated with using emojis, such as a poop emoji. Players can customise the outfit that the player character wears. The game can be played on a phone, and is free-to-play.

== Development ==
Messenger is a free browser game developed in WebGL. The game was created by Vicente Lucendo and Michael Sungaila, with lo-fi music by Kevin Colombin. It was released on 25 September 2025 by the publisher Abeto, who create "interactive realtime experiences".

== Reception ==
Writing for Polygon, Austin Manchester praised Messenger for making fetch quests more relaxing than in other games. Manchester also praised the game's visual style, which he compared to Sable and Wheel World. He concluded that while the game's world was very small, it was "one that feels alive", with "a distinct personality". Luke Plunkett's article for Aftermath similarly praised the feeling of the small world, its high level of detail, and the art style; he highlighted the multiplayer aspects as "a nice touch" and stated that he "would have paid $20 for this on Steam". Edwin Evans-Thirwell of Rock Paper Shotgun believed that it was "ridiculous" that Messenger could be a browser game, and compared it to A Short Hike.
