= Daily Bread Co-operative =

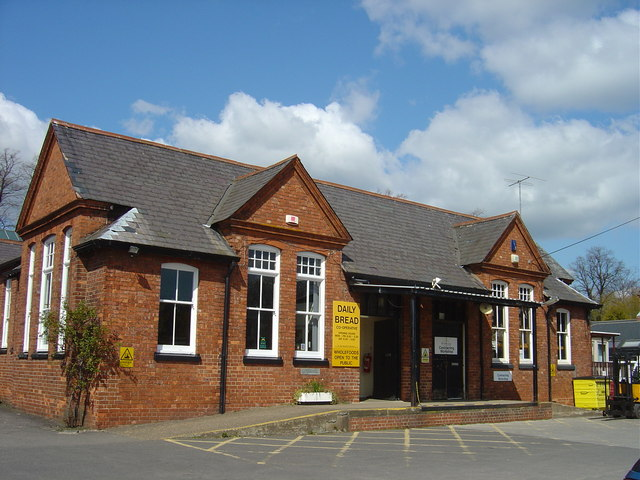
Shop on Bedford Road, Northampton

Daily Bread Co-operative is an English Christian workers' co-operative specialising in packing and selling wholefoods. It was the first workers' co-operative to register under what is now known as the "white rules", and is listed as Co-op number 1 under the Industrial Common Ownership Movement (ICOM), which now forms part of Co-operatives UK. One of the founding members, Roger Sawtell, was the first chair of ICOM.

== History ==
Daily Bread began in the Northampton parish of St. Peter's, Weston Favell when a group of nine friends formed the idea of taking their Christian beliefs and values into the business environment. The name chosen comes from a line in the Lord's Prayer.

Daily Bread Co-operative (DBC) was registered as a limited company in March 1976, the first business of its kind to adopt a new set of Model Rules for Common Ownership. It was a further four years before trading started, on 1 October 1980, in what was once the laundry of St. Andrew's Hospital, reputedly the largest privately owned psychiatric hospital in the country.

== Daily Bread, Cambridge ==
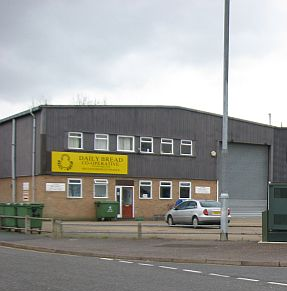
Daily Bread Co-operative factory, Cambridge

Daily Bread has served as a model for other co-operatives and wholefood sellers, including the Unicorn Grocery. Daily Bread in Cambridge opened in 1992 with a staff of five, one ex-member from Northampton and four other full-time members. Its structure is similar to Daily Bread in Northampton, and the Cambridge enterprise was given permission to trade under the original name and to use the co-operative's logo.
