= Alexander Marshall (evangelist) =

Alexander Marshall (13 December 1846 – 9 August 1928) was a Plymouth Brethren Evangelist from Scotland involved in much pioneering work, including Canada.

== Early life ==
Marshall was born in Stranraer in Wigtownshire, Scotland, on 13 December 1846. In Stranraer he worked as a solicitor's clerk until the age of eighteen, then moved to Glasgow where he became a member of the Plymouth Brethren Church.

In 1879 he travelled to America and then on to Canada. In 1882, he married Amy Florence Tate.

== Evangelism ==
He travelled extensively, crossing the Atlantic 36 times during his lifetime. In 1897 he travelled to Iceland. His evangelist activities also took him to Egypt, Palestine Central America, Mexico and New Zealand.

Initially, Marshall was connected with some of the early Needed Truth Brethren, but could not go on with them over disagreements regarding what is a legitimate breaking of bread meeting. Marshall insisted that any gathering of two or three believers to break bread could be recognized as an assembly around the Lord's Table. Marshall spent much time preaching with other pioneers like Donald Ross and Donald Munro. These men who worked together are sometimes considered to be the beginnings of the Gospel Hall Brethren.

Marshall had urged Christians to make public protests against theological modernism. However, Marshall was also accused of heresy himself.

He died on 9 August 1928.

== Publications ==
He was author of several works, including:

- Holding Fast the Faithful Word - Whither are we Drifting? (1908) 56 pages
- God's Way of Salvation, a 32-page booklet first published in the 1920s The booklet was published in eighteen languages with over four million copies in print.
- Christ or the "critics": Whom shall we believe? first published in 1920.
