= Messenger (surname) =

Messenger is an English surname. Notable people withe the surname include:

- Charles A. Messenger (1855–?), British-Australian rower
- Chas Messenger, 1914–2008), British cyclist
- Gordon Messenger (born 1962), British Royal Marines general
- Herbert "Dally" Messenger (1883–1959), Australia rugby footballer
- James Messenger (1821–1901), English world champion sculler
- Lillian Rozell Messenger (1843–1921), American poet
- Melinda Messenger (born 1971), British TV personality and model
- Randy Messenger (born 1981), American professional baseball player
- Rob Messenger (born 1962), Australian politician
- Ruth Messenger (1884–1964), American historian
- Shannon Messenger (born 1981), American children's author
- Tony Messenger, American columnist
- Wally Messenger (1891–1961), Australian rugby league footballer
