= Kevin Davidson and The Voices =

- Origin: Memphis, Tennessee; United States
- Genres: Gospel
- Years active: 1988 - present
- Label: New Haven Records

Kevin Davidson and The Voices formally "Kevin Davidson and the Voices of Binghampton" is an American Gospel music choir from Memphis, Tennessee.

== Musical career ==
Currently signed with New Haven Records, the group formed in December 1988. Kevin Davidson and The Voices have received Stellar Award and Dove Award nominations and strong radio acceptance.

http://www.manta.com/coms2/dnbcompany_ddy902 Life Worship And Outreach Center, Inc (Dominion Church Of Memphis)

== Discography ==
(1993) It's Possible [Kevin Davidson & The Voices of Binghampton]

(1995) I Searched the World [Kevin Davidson & The Voices of Binghampton]

(1996) Miracle Worker [Kevin Davidson & The Voices of Binghampton]

(1998) Celebrate [Kevin Davidson & The Voices]

(2000) Language of the Millennium [Kevin Davidson & The Voices]

(2001) Soultown USA [Kevin Davidson & The Voices]

(2003) Full Circle [Kevin Davidson & The Voices]

(2006) Overflow [Kevin Davidson & The Voices]

(2008) The Best of Kevin Davidson [Kevin Davidson & The Voices]

(2010) Chapter 1 - Compilation

(2014) Something Happens [Kevin Davidson & The UCICC Fellowship Choir]
