= East to West =

East to West may refer to:

- East to West (duo), American Christian duo
- "East to West" (song), 2007 song by Casting Crowns
- East West (band), American Christian rock band
