= The HiMiG Singers =

Philippine choral group

The Himig Singers
- Also known as: The Himig Singers
- Origin: Davao City, Philippines
- Genres: Gospel choir
- Years active: 1988–present
- Members: http://himigsingers.org/blog/current-members
- Website: http://himigsingers.org/

The HiMiG Singers are a choral group from Davao City in the Philippines.

== History ==
The group was originally formed in 1988 (DCHS Singing Teens) as a secular choir whose founder, musical director & conductor was Mrs. Evangeline Matunog Lapore, DCHS music teacher, a Davao known artist and soprano with a Bachelor of Music Degree majoring in Voice from Silliman University, winner of the NAMCYA in 1968 & DEPED Music Supervisor. In 1987 original members of the DCHNS (Davao City National High School) choral group "singing teens" joined the NAMCYA at the CCP (Cultural Centre of the Philippines) and toured in Baguio City. After that competition in September 1988 pioneer tenor, concert artist & conductor Mr. Rey Allan Lacuin, while he was a freshman in college, with other members of the group Channy Prieto & Gen Dempsey (secretary) gathered to organise and form the Himig Singers. The group's first accompanist was Gregorio "Greg" Canceran through the Singing Teens' conductor and founder eventually advisor ("Ma'am Vangie Lapore).

According to the founder Mrs. Lapore, "We founded the Himig Singers in September 1988 in my chorus room at BL building (DCHNS)! Since I was promoted as Division Supervisor for Music I could no longer handle the group I made an arrangement w/ Rev. David Geconcillo (UCCP Pastor) for them (the himig singers) to practice at UCCP City Church taking Greg Canceran as their accompanist, Alan Rey Lacuin, conductor and Channy Prieto assisting Alan in the concerns of the choir and reports to me in whatever their activities were!" these were the exact response of Ma'am Lapore and if you like to know more about the groups history you can verify these facts by asking those names mentioned above how the HIMIG SINGERS came about.

After two years as himig singers ...

In 1990, Alvin "Bong" Aviola inherited the group and became the group's musical director

=== The HiMiG Gospel Singers ===
In 2005 during a tour of Canada, a smaller choir was formed and specialised in gospel and Christian contemporary music. The choir was named The HiMiG Gospel Singers and mostly sing at smaller venues such as local churches.

== Awards ==
In 2007, the group won the top prize in the mixed vocal ensembles category at the First Asian Choir Games, held in Jakarta, Indonesia.

The Himig Singers, won the National Music Competitions for Young Artists in 1990 and 1993; the "award of the audience" at the Vivache 2004 International Choral Festival in Veszprém, Hungary; the first prize in the mixed category, as well as the grand prize, in the 26th International Youth and Music Festival in Vienna, Austria in 1997; and first prize in the polyphonic category at the XV International Music Festival in Cantonigros, Spain, also in 1997. At the Vienna festival, the group garnered a 99.93-percent rating, the highest rating in the history of the competition as of 1997.
