= Music in the Rockies =

Festival in Colorado, US

Music in the Rockies was a week-long festival held in Estes Park, Colorado, which featured a combination of seminars, competitions, concerts, and events related to Contemporary Christian Music, other kinds of Christian music, and the Christian music industry. An event called Immerse has replaced it.

== History ==
The event started in 1975 as Seminar in the Rockies, launched by Christian Artists' Corp's president Cam Floria. In 2000, the Gospel Music Association (GMA) began to operate most of the event. In 2004, they changed the event's name to GMA Music in the Rockies. The event/festival was held at YMCA of the Rockies in Estes Park southwest of Fort Collins. Both "Music in the Rockies" and "Seminar in the Rockies" had a series of concerts in the evenings, with some notable performers and attendees. The 34th annual event was held from August 3 to 9, 2008.

In 2009, the event was replaced by Immerse held in Nashville. Immerse is run by the Gospel Music Association and LifeWay Christian Resources. Immerse features a series of seminars and has a competition with several categories. There is an overall winner.

== Winners ==
- 2008 Rough Draft
- 2004 Ryan Wingo & Jim Odom "Top of My Lungs"
- 2000 Foolish Things
- 1994 Terri Bocklund - "All Things"
- 1992 Point of Grace
- 1992 Janet Hawlik (comedy)
- 1988 David Phelps
- 1980s Babbie Mason

== Notable performers and attendees ==
Numerous national recording artists attended the event as well as performing or competing.

Selected:

- Amy Grant
- Babbie Mason
- BarlowGirl
- Barry McGuire
- Burlap to Cashmere
- CeCe Winans
- Chasing Furies
- Chris Sligh (American Idol finalist)
- Chris Tomlin
- Don Francisco
- First Call
- Jaci Velasquez
- Jars of Clay
- Jordin Sparks (American Idol winner)
- Larnelle Harris
- Larry Norman
- Mark Lowry
- Mary Mary
- Matthew West
- Michael W. Smith
- Nichole Nordeman
- Pat Boone
- Pete Carlson
- Point of Grace
- Rachael Lampa
- Rebecca St. James
- Sandi Patty
- Stacie Orrico
- Steven Curtis Chapman
- Steve Taylor
- Switchfoot
- The Imperials
- The Waiting
- Bryan Duncan
- Whiteheart
- Oliver North (an unannounced "wave" to attendees on stage 1989/1990)
- Brennan Manning
- Sheila Walsh
- Walt Mills
- Darlene Koldenhoven
