= Acappella (group) =

American vocal group

- Origin: Paris, Tennessee, U.S.
- Genres: Contemporary Christian, Contemporary worship music, Southern Gospel
- Years active: 1982–present
- Labels: The Acappella Company, Word, Epic
- Website: www.acappella.org

Acappella is an all-male contemporary Christian vocal group founded in 1982 by Keith Lancaster, who has been the singer, songwriter, and producer throughout the group's history. The group only consists of vocalists who sing in a cappella style without instrumental accompaniment.

Acappella's fan base steadily grew through the 1980s as the group experienced many lineup changes and constantly experimented with fresh new sounds. The landmark album, Sweet Fellowship (1988), ushered in one of the most significant developments in the group's membership and style. Lancaster stepped out of the group as lead singer to focus on the role of producer and manager. The group continued to change after that, developing a unique sound that has been mimicked by countless groups around the world.

Signed to Word Records in 1990 (and later to Epic Records), Acappella's popularity soared with releases such as Rescue, We Have Seen His Glory, All That I Need, and Set Me Free. Media exposure included television appearances, while the song "More Precious Than Gold" became the centerpiece of a Sony Camcorder television commercial and was broadcast across the USA. Hymns For All The World helped to increase the group's exposure internationally. Acappella has toured extensively around the world, singing in Africa, Australia, Canada, China, Europe, Jamaica, Japan, South America and the Caribbean in addition to thousands of concerts in the United States.

In 1986, Lancaster launched a spinoff group called Acappella Vocal Band (AVB). AVB originally opened and sang backup for Acappella, then branched off to tour on its own under the Acappella Ministries umbrella from 1988 to 2000.

After exploring various musical styles over more than three decades, Acappella has returned to its roots, utilizing an extensive host of alumni vocalists to fill current concerts. Acappella's worldwide impact was recognized with the group's 2007 induction into the Christian Music Hall of Fame.

== Membership ==
=== Current members ===
Acappella changed its format in June 2014 (formally announced in August 2014). Acappella is not limited to one combination of singers. In fact, every concert features a special lineup drawn from veteran concert music ministers who have sung with Acappella across the years. It is not uncommon for a concert to feature vocalists ranging in ages in their 20s, 30s, 40s and 50s, drawing from Acappella's vast catalog of original songs.

Those who participate in concerts since the new format have included Rodney Britt, Wes McKinzie, Gary Evans, Ken McAlpin, Robert C. Guy, Robin Brannon, Duane Adams, Wayburn Dean, Anthony Lancaster, Zac George, Nic Dunbar, Barry Wilson, George Pendergrass, Steve Maxwell, Sean Samuel, Keith Lancaster, Gary Moyers, Matt Sammons, Jabbarri Jones, Matt Nunnally, Kevin Schaffer, Zachary Wilson and AVB alumni Aaron Herman, Brishan Hatcher, and Jeremy Swindle.

=== Group formations ===
Bass	Baritone	2nd Tenor	1st Tenor	Vocal Percussion / Utility	Video of Formation	Year(s)	Albums/Notes
Wes McKinzie	Anthony Lancaster	Zac George	Jabbarri Jones	Malcolm Himes	I Feel Good	May 2013 – January 2014	Luke Coles filled in for Malcolm Himes in a January 2014 concert.
Wes McKinzie	Anthony Lancaster	Zac George	Raymond Mobley	Malcolm Himes	Take It Away	August 2011 – April 2013	Water From The Well (single) (2011), Wanna Be Like You (single) (2011), Just Say The Word (single) (2012), Have Yourself A Merry Little Christmas (single) (2012)
Wes McKinzie	Anthony Lancaster	Zac George	Zachary Wilson	Robin Brannon	Scripture Medley	August 2009 – August 2011	The Walls Came Down (single) (2011)
Allen Brantley	Anthony Lancaster	Zac George	Zachary Wilson	Robin Brannon		Summer 2008 – July 2009	Find Your Way (2009)
Allen Brantley	Robin Brannon	JJ Blevins	Zachary Wilson	Zac George		Spring 2008	
Allen Brantley	Robin Brannon	Jordan House	Zachary Wilson	Zac George	He's Gonna Let You Know	January 2006 – December 2007	Radiance (2006) Cory Martin was a temporary fill-in for some concerts in the Fall of 2007 when Jordan had work commitments. Video with Cory: More Than A Friend
Gary Evans	Robin Brannon	Jordan House	Zachary Wilson	Zac George	Glory And Honor	August 2005 – December 2005	Radiance (2006) – in production
Gary Evans	Nic Dunbar	Sean Samuel	Matt Sammons		Well On My Way	Spring 2005	
Gary Evans	Nic Dunbar	Sean Samuel	Matt Nunnally		I Understand	August 2002 – December 2004	Heaven and Earth (2004) This quartet at times included backup vocalists: Cory Martin, Dale Pratt, and Albert Hall.
Gary Evans	Steve Maxwell	Barry Wilson	Don Connel		America The Beautiful	January 2002 – July 2002	
Gary Evans	Steve Maxwell	Barry Wilson	Kevin Schaffer			January 2001 – December 2001	Live From Paris (2002), Hymns For All The Ages (2001) Jeremy Swindle filled in some concerts for Kevin Schaffer, who was on paternity leave, in the spring.
Ken McAlpin	Steve Maxwell	Barry Wilson	Kevin Schaffer			January 2000 – December 2000	Hymns For All The Ages (2001) – in production
Ken McAlpin	Gary Moyers	Barry Wilson	Kevin Schaffer		Shut De Do	January 1998 – December 1999	All That I Need (1999), The Collection (1998) Allen Krehbiel filled in some concerts for Barry Wilson, who was on voice rest.
Gary Miller	Gary Moyers	Ken McAlpin	Kevin Schaffer			August 1997 – December 1997	
Gary Miller	Gary Moyers	Steve Reischl	Kevin Schaffer		Everybody Said (But Nobody Did)	February 1997 – August 1997	Act of God (1997)
Duane Adams	Gary Moyers	Steve Reischl	Kevin Schaffer		My Lord And My God	January 1997	Act of God (1997) – in production
Robert Guy	Duane Adams	Steve Reischl	Kevin Schaffer			August 1995 –	Act of God (1997) – in production
Tim Storms	Robert Guy	Steve Reischl	Duane Adams		I Feel Good	1995	
Robert Guy	Duane Adams	Steve Reischl	Gary Moyers		Pray Every Day	at least April 1995 – at least September 1995	Beyond a Doubt (1995)
Robert Guy	Duane Adams	George Pendergrass	Gary Moyers		Criminal On The Cross	1993	Hymns For All The World (1994), Espanol (1994)
Duane Adams	Wayburn Dean	George Pendergrass	Gary Moyers		Hush	1989–1993	Set Me Free (1993), We Have Seen His Glory (1991), Rescue (1990), He Leadeth Me (1990), Growing Up In The Lord (1990)
Rodney Britt	Wayburn Dean	George Pendergrass	Gary Moyers		Now To Him	June 1988 – at least April 1989	Sweet Fellowship (1988) This quartet at times included backup vocalists: Duane Adams and Denise Sweet.
Rodney Britt	Keith Lancaster						While the Ages Roll On (1987), Better Than Life (1987), Conquerors (1986)
Rodney Britt	Bill Spencer	Keith Lancaster			John The Revelator	1985	Travelin' Shoes (1985)
Ron McCommas	Gary Yeager	Keith Lancaster	Jeff Martin		Brother Taylor	1984–1985	Perfect Peace (1984)
Ron McCommas	Gary Yeager	Keith Lancaster	Jeff Martin	Tim Martin	I Want To Be Like Him	1984	
Ron McCommas	Gary Yeager	Keith Lancaster	Tim Tripp	?? Can you identify in video (far left)? Kevin McCall??	Sail On	May 1983 – July 1984	As "His Image" – Tim Tripp took a break from the group during the fall of 1983.
Bobby Collum	Gary Yeager	Keith Lancaster	??Greg Pittman??			Fall 1982	As "His Image" – Made in His Image (1983)
Bobby Collum	Gary Yeager	Randy Hatchett	Keith Lancaster				As "His Image" – Heaven's Gonna Shine (1982)
Tom Graham	Gary Yeager	Randy Hatchett	Keith Lancaster			1982	As "His Image" – Til He Comes (1982)
	Gary Yeager	Randy Hatchett	Keith Lancaster		Til He Comes	1982	As "His Image"

=== Previous members ===
- Duane Adams – Duane is one of the most versatile singers that has sung with Acappella. He joined the group as the bass and recorded on Growing Up In The Lord, He Leadeth Me, Rescue, We Have Seen His Glory, and Set Me Free. After Set Me Free was released, baritone Wayburn Dean left the group and Duane took his part. As the baritone, Duane's vocals can be heard on Acappella En Espanol, Hymns For All The World, Beyond A Doubt, and back to sing bass in "Let's Show And Tell" on Act of God. He later left the group to take the role of Worship Leader at Amarillo South Church. Duane currently lives in Odessa, Texas.
- James "JJ" Blevins – JJ was briefly in Acappella in early 2008. He is a graduate of Adventures in Missions (AIM) and has worked with congregations across the country. He is currently a House Parent at Fair Haven Children's Home in Missouri.
- Robin Brannon – Robin sang baritone for Acappella and was famous for his vocal percussion skills and incomparable energy on stage. He appeared on the Radiance and Find Your Way albums. He now serves as the Worship and Community Engagement Minister for The Church of Christ at White Station in Memphis, TN.
- Allen Brantley – Allen appeared on Radiance and Find Your Way in addition to assisting on Keith Lancaster's Praise & Harmony projects. He lives in Alabama with his wife Kim (one of Keith's daughters) and sings with the Lancaster Family. Allen also currently serves as Worship Pastor and Executive Director of Programming for Church Unlimited in Birmingham, AL.
- Rodney Britt – Rodney delivers sermons for the Pine Tree Church of Christ in Longview, Texas. He also sings bass for The Sounds of Glory.
- Don Connel – Don sang tenor in Acappella in the spring of 2002. He also participated in the 20th Anniversary Reunion. He works for an advertising and marketing company in Abilene, Texas. After his time with Acappella, he sang with Fishers of Men and Cornerstone. Cornerstone produced 2 CD's: Standing on the Rock and Everywhere. Don leads worship for the Oldham Lane church of Christ in Abilene, TX.
- Wayburn Dean – Continues to sing and record and currently works with Inside Prison Ministries.
- Nic Dunbar – Nic serves as the worship minister at the West Houston Church of Christ in Houston, Texas.
- Gary Evans – Now in Lubbock, Texas (his hometown), he helps lead worship at South Plains Church of Christ and works as a developer for World Bible School.
- Zac George – Zac currently serves as Worship and Outreach Minister at West Side Church of Christ in Russellville, Arkansas.
- Tom Graham –
- Robert Guy – Robert appeared on Acappella En Espanol, Hymns For All The World, Beyond A Doubt and Act of God.
- Randy Hatchett – Randy sang with "His Image Quartet" and appeared on Til He Comes, Heaven's Gonna Shine and Made in His Image. Randy currently is an elder at the Jackson Park Church of Christ in Nashville, TN.
- Malcolm Himes –
- Jordan House – Jordan works full time in the Bible department for Greater Atlanta Christian School. He has also been the worship minister for the Campus Church in Norcross, GA since September 2015.
- Jabbarri Jones – Jabbarri is the worship minister for the Singing Oaks Church of Christ in Denton, Texas.
- Anthony Lancaster – Anthony is the worship minister for the Madison Church of Christ in Madison, Tennessee.
- Keith Lancaster – Keith continues as producer for Acappella. In addition, he conducts Praise & Harmony workshops around the world. He is currently the worship minister at the Cullman Church of Christ in Cullman, Alabama.
- Jeff Martin – Jeff attended Abliene Christian University prior to joining Acappella. He sang in ACU's A Cappella chorus with bass Ron McCommas and future AVB member Dave Fletcher. He was the high tenor on the Perfect Peace album. Jeff worked in ministry nearly 30 years. He released a solo project, "Dance Before The Lord", in 1998. His family moved to Eagle River, Alaska, in 2007, to serve at Riverside Community Church. He died on August 13, 2017 at the age of 58.
- Tim Martin – Tim currently lives in Comanche, Texas and works with Hospice. He has done humanitarian aid work in Russia, Croatia, New Orleans (after Katrina) and Haiti after the 2010 earthquake and is a first responder for the Desdemona Volunteer Fire Department. Tim is still singing Cowboy, Gospel, Bluegrass with a band he formed called "Spirit of the West" and recently has teamed up with Glenn Murray to form 'Martin and Murray' – keeping the Cowboy tradition alive and focusing on Cowboy Poetry Gatherings.
- Steve Maxwell – Steve serves as Worship Minister at North Atlanta Church of Christ in Atlanta, GA. Previously he has served as College and Young Adults Minister at CrossPoint Church of Christ in Florence, Alabama.
- Ken McAlpin – Ken serves as worship minister at Campbell Church of Christ in Campbell, California. In addition, he is now a member of the a cappella group Sweet Deliverance.
- Ron McCommas – Business performance advisor at Insperity.
- Wes McKinzie – Assistant professor of business at Oklahoma Christian University.
- Gary Miller – Gary sang bass for Vocal Union for many years before and after his membership in Acappella. He died March 12, 2011 at the age of 60.
- Raymond Mobley –
- Gary Moyers – "Mo" is currently the Worship & Technology minister at Broadway Church of Christ in Lubbock, TX. The Moyers family lives in the Lubbock, Texas area.
- Matt Nunnally – Matt sang 1st tenor on Heaven And Earth. He currently sings tenor for First Day.
- George Pendergrass – George lives in the Nashville area, performing with Merging Blue.
- Greg Pittman – Public Relations and Human Communications major, Abilene Christian University. Greg joined the group as lead vocalist and 1st tenor in fall of 1982 and was featured on the album "Made in His Image".
- Steve Reischl – Steve sang lead on Beyond A Doubt and Act of God. His most popular song was "If There Were No God." After leaving Acappella, he performed with the Contemporary Christian band Newsong. He is currently pursuing a solo career.
- Matt Sammons – Matt sang tenor in the spring of 2005 and on an Acappella Cruise. He works as a professional piano man in Little Rock, AR.
- Sean Samuel – Works with Disney in Orlando, Florida.
- Kevin Schaffer – Kevin is the 1st tenor on the Act of God, All That I Need, Hymns For All The Ages, and Live From Paris albums. His most famous lead was "Walking That Line." He currently works with Central Church of Christ in Amarillo, Texas.
- Bill Spencer – Bill and his wife are executive directors at Narrow Gate Foundation, a Christian discipleship experience for young men ages 18–25.
- Tim Storms – Tim sings at the Pierce Arrow Theater in Branson, Missouri.
- Tim Tripp – Tim was a member from May 1983 until July 1984. He took a break from the group during the fall of 1983 and missed his only opportunity to record with the group. He is currently the senior minister at West Side Church of Christ in Russellville, Arkansas. This congregation also has Zac George on staff as worship minister and Mark Hixson (a former Acappella sound technician) as youth minister.
- Barry Wilson – Milton Hershey Foundation in Hershey, Pennsylvania.
- Zachary Wilson – Zachary sang on the "Radiance" and "Find Your Way" albums. He was in the group for six years and is most known for his soaring lead on "All Men Will Know" (from the "Radiance" album) and his live performances of "Take It Away" and "Shut De Do." He graduated from Oklahoma Christian University and leads worship at CARE Church in Richardson, Texas.
- Gary Yeager

== Discography ==
The labels are taken from each of the albums' original releases; many of these albums have been re-released under new distributors. Lyrics to each of these albums along with scripture references and other relevant information can be found at Acadisc.com.

- Perfect Peace (1984, Clifty Records)
- Travelin' Shoes (1985, Clifty Records)
- Conquerors (1986, Clifty Records)
- Better Than Life (1987, Clifty Records)
- While the Ages Roll On (1987, Clifty Records)
- Sweet Fellowship (1988, Clifty Records)
- Growing Up In the Lord (1989, Clifty Records)
- He Leadeth Me (1990, Acappella Music Group)
- Rescue (1990, Word)
- We Have Seen His Glory (1991, Word)
- Set Me Free (1993, Word)
- Acappella en Español (1994, Word)
- Gold (1994, Word)
- Platinum (1994, Word)
- Hymns for All the World (1994, Word)
- Beyond a Doubt (1995, Word)
- Act of God (1997, Word)
- The Collection (1998, Diamante)
- All That I Need (1999, Diamante)
- Hymns for All the Ages (2001, The Acappella Company)
- Live from Paris (2002, The Acappella Company)
- Heaven And Earth (2004, The Acappella Company)
- Radiance (2006, The Acappella Company)
- Find Your Way (2009, The Acappella Company)
- The Walls Came Down (single) (2011, The Acappella Company)
- Water From The Well (single) (2011, The Acappella Company)
- Wanna Be Like You (single) (2011, The Acappella Company)
- Just Say The Word (single) (2012, The Acappella Company)
- Have Yourself A Merry Little Christmas (single) (2012, The Acappella Company)
- I Feel Fine (single) (2014, The Acappella Company)
- Acappella 40 (2022, The Acappella Company)

Before the group was named Acappella, it was briefly named "His Image"; the records released under that name are:

- Til He Comes (1982, Clifty Records)
- Heaven’s Gonna Shine (1983, Clifty Records)
- Made in His Image (1984, Clifty Records)

In addition to projects recorded under the Acappella name, the group collaborated with AVB, Keith Lancaster and other artists on numerous "Acappella Series", "Acappella Scripture Songs" and "Acappella Praise & Worship" albums in the 1990s. These projects include:

- Acappella Southern (1990, Word)
- Prime Time (1991, Word)
- Acappella America (1992, Word)
- Acappella Christmas (1992, Word)
- Acappella Country (1992, Word)
- Acappella Spirituals (1993, Word)
- Acappella Carols (1993, Word) – Originally released as A Savior Is Born (1989-cassette; 1990-CD)
- The Parables of Jesus (1993, Word)
- Acappella Ladies (1994, Word)
- Acappella Resurrection (1994, Word)
- Acappella Gospel (1994, Word)
- The Reason (1994, Word)
- Acappella Classycal (1994, Word)
- The Book of James (1994, Word)
- In His Presence (1994, The Acappella Company)
- Heaven Is in My Heart (1994, The Acappella Company)
- In God We Trust (1995, The Acappella Company)
- Communion (1995, The Acappella Company)
- Acappella Wedding 1 (1995, Word)
- Acappella Spirituals 2 (1995, Word)
- Acappella Classics (1995, Word)
- Acappella Favorites (1995, Word)
- Heroes of Faith (1995, The Acappella Company)
- Acappella Children Christmas (1995, The Acappella Company)
- Exalt Him (1996, The Acappella Company)
- Acappella Praise Service (1996, The Acappella Company)
- Acappella Jazz (1996, The Acappella Company)
- Acappella Wedding 2 (1996, The Acappella Company)
- Acappella Classics 2 (1996, The Acappella Company)
- Acappella Melodies (1996, The Acappella Company)

Compilations of Acappella, AVB, Keith Lancaster and other Acappella Company songs include:

- Hear It in Our Voice (1994, Word)
- Hear It in Our Voice II (1994, Word)
- Acappella Favorites (1995, Word)
- Hear It in Our Voice III (1995, The Acappella Company)
- Acappella Wedding Longplay (1999, The Acappella Company)
- Acappella Spirituals Longplay (1999, The Acappella Company)
- Acappella Family Christmas (1999, The Acappella Company)
- Acappella Gospel Longplay (2000, The Acappella Company)
- Acappella Classics Longplay (2000, The Acappella Company)
- Acappella Word of God Longplay (2000, The Acappella Company)
