= Widdlesworth =

American Christian indie rock band

- (L-R) Chris Kingsland, Chris Solyntjes; Ryland Raus, Tony Livigni, Ricky Dyson

Background information
- Origin: Akron, Ohio
- Genres: Christian rock Indie rock
- Years active: 2003–2006
- Members: Ryland Raus; Tony Livigni; Chris Kingsland; Ricky Dyson; Chris Solyntjes

Widdlesworth was a Christian indie rock band from Akron, Ohio. Widdlesworth was formed in November 2003 by Ryland Raus as an acoustic solo project.

== Members ==
- Ryland Raus – Lead Vocals
- Ricky Dyson – Bass
- Tony Livigni – Guitar
- Chris Kingsland – drums, Backing Vocals
- Chris Solyntjes – Guitar, Backing Vocals

== Former members ==
- Jesse Trillet – drums

== Discography ==
- Metrognome EP (2005)
- I Am Not A Theory (2006)
