= Even Now (Foolish Things album) =

Studio album by Foolish Things
- Released: 19 January 2008
- Genre: Rock; Alternative rock Christian rock
- Producer: Tommy Collier

Foolish Things chronology
Let's Not Forget the Story (2006)	Even Now (2008)

Professional ratings
Review scores
Source	Rating
Christian Music Today	3.5/5 stars
Christian Music Central	86%

Even Now is the second and final studio album of Colorado worship band, Foolish Things.

== Track listing ==
1. "Shooting in the Dark" – 4:52 (Jorgensen)
2. "Who'd You Put in Charge" – 3:48 (Jorgensen)
3. "Even Now" – 4:00 (Jorgensen)
4. "Fly" – 3:46 (Labriola)
5. "Love Chained Me Here" – 4:30 (Jorgensen)
6. "Holding On to What is Easy" – 4:18 (Labriola)
7. "Fight" – 4:04 (Labriola)
8. "Love Atmosphere" – 4:34 (Labriola)
9. "Keep Us Together" – 4:23 (Jorgensen)
10. "Let Go" – 4:57 (Labriola)

== Personnel ==
- Isaac Jorgensen – Vocals, Guitar, Songwriting
- James Rightmer – Guitar, Piano, Keyboards, Programming, Synthesizer
- Mark Labriola II – Vocals, Guitar, Songwriting
- Nate Phillips – Bass guitar
- Shaul Hagen – Drums, Percussion
- Radical Face – [As the Squirrel]
