= Superbook =

Superbook may refer to:

- Superbook (1981 TV series), a Japanese Christian anime television series initially produced at Tatsunoko Production and TV Tokyo in Japan.
- Superbook (2011 TV series), an American Christian animated television series produced by CBN.
