= Octappella =

American a cappella group

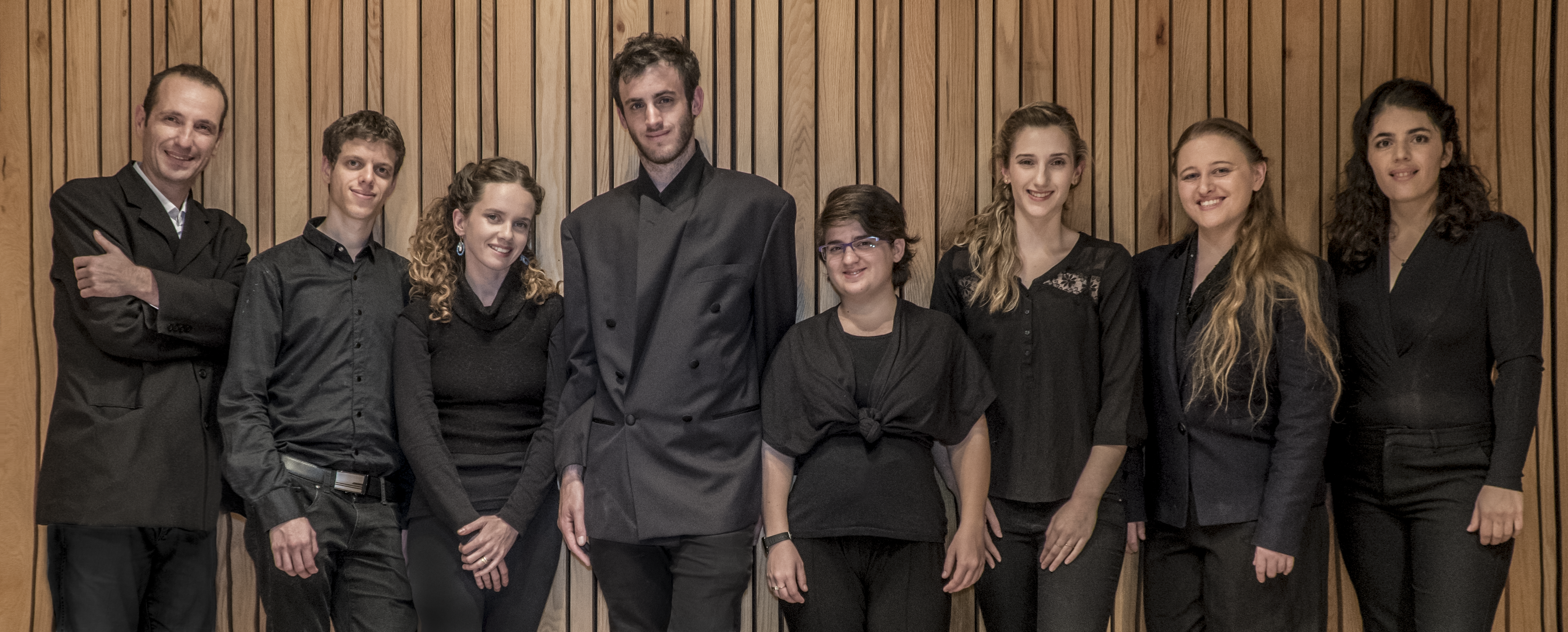

Octappella is a seven-man contemporary a cappella group based in Utah. The members first sang together in college. Since forming Octappella, they have released three albums and were featured performers at the 2002 Salt Lake City Olympic Games. Their albums feature a mix of humorous and original material and covers of classic songs from groups such as Styx and REO Speedwagon. The group won two 2006 Contemporary A Cappella Society awards, one in the Religious Album category (for Worship) and one for Religious Song (for Anthem to My King, from Worship).

== Members ==
- Jeff Loveridge, bass
- David Pack, bass
- Brett Lambourne, baritone/vocal percussion
- Ryan Judkins, tenor/baritone
- Matt Cropper, tenor/baritone
- Jeremy Griggs, high tenor
- Wes Brewer, high tenor

== Discography ==
- The Voice, 2000
- Motion, 2002
- Worship, 2005
- Christmas, 2007
