= Jesse & The Rockers =

American Christian punk/pop punk band

- Origin: Alabama, United States
- Genres: Pop punk Christian punk
- Years active: 1997–2001
- Labels: Screaming Giant Records

Jesse & The Rockers was an American Christian punk/pop punk group.

== History ==
Jesse & The Rockers was formed in 1997 by Heath "Hero" Williamson as a side project to what he felt was his "serious" band. Originally consisting of Hero and Rocket, Larry was quickly added to the band. After some shuffling, the band members settled into their positions: Hero on bass and lead vocals, Rocket on drums, and Larry on lead guitar.

=== Early career ===
In August 1997, the band started approaching their music from a more ministry-oriented standpoint. One of the results of this change in view was the decision of Brian to become a Christian. Originally performing in a side project known as The Wedgeez, Brian was asked to play second guitar for The Rockers, and began performing with them in November 1999.

After recording their first album, T.I.N. (Time is Now) in February 1998, the band began a forty-day prayer fast, hoping to be signed by one of the many record labels they had contacted. On the thirty-seventh day, Screaming Giant Records (home of Lugnut) contacted the band, claiming that they wanted to sign the band "yesterday." The label's exuberance led to the band's first national tour. The band was also featured on the Trinity Broadcasting Network program G-Rock, giving them international exposure. Because of this national and international exposure, the band would sell ten thousand copies of T.I.N. The lead singer, Hero, considers the band to be one of the last bands of the "pre-Internet" generation. The band initially contacted Screaming Giant because they saw their name in a zine, and like other bands of their time, were often touring "blindly," with no contact with a venue other than a few phone calls.

In 1999, after several tours, Brian left the band and settled down. The band continued as a three-piece. They toured throughout the summer of 1999, and recorded their second album, Madison Road, as a trio. While touring to support the album, Jason Roach joined as the new rhythm guitarist. Shortly after, Larry Rox quit, and "The Name" joined to play keyboards for the group. After a few months, "The Name" left the band. Mitchell Gooden joined as the band's new rhythm guitarist, and the band began touring again. Around this time, Hero met his wife on a Rockers tour at a show in Mississippi, and they now perform together under the name Justin Hero.

=== Late career ===
In 2000, the band began to form a new style, and as a result they left Screaming Giant Records. They re-formed under the name Heaven not Spaceward, and after releasing one E.P., broke up to pursue other interests.

In 2002, the band briefly regrouped as a trio (consisting of Hero, Rocket, and Mitch) and released a free E.P. and toured throughout the Southeast. This was a final farewell for Rockers fans.
