= Mercy's Mark Quartet =

American Christian music group

- Genres: Christian
- Years active: 2004 - 2008
- Website: www.mercysmarkquartet.com

Mercy's Mark Quartet was an American Christian music group.

== Musical career ==
The group was founded in 2004 by Garry R. Jones who sang baritone and also served as group pianist/producer. They won the Singing News Fan Awards' Horizon Group of the Year award in 2005. They rose to prominence within the Christian music genre charting songs for Daywind Records and gaining national attention within a short period of time. The group toured extensively throughout the United States as well as Canada and Norway. In the fall of 2007 Garry R. Jones announced that Mercy's Mark would no longer be touring for the remainder of that year but indicated that the group could return in the future.

Group Members:

Tenors

- Anthony Facello (2004–2006)
- Brent Mitchell (2006–2008)

Lead

- Josh Feemster (2004–2007)
- Scott Allen (2007–2008)

Baritone

- Garry R. Jones (2004–2008)

Bass

- Chris West (2004–2005)
- Christian Davis (2006–2008)

Pianist

- Garry R. Jones (2004–2008) (died April 27, 2025)

== Members ==
=== Lineups ===
2004-2006 (under the name "Mercy's Mark Quartet")	2006-2007	2007–2008
Anthony Facello – tenor; Josh Feemster – lead; Garry R. Jones – baritone, piano; Chris West – bass	Brent Mitchell – tenor; Josh Feemster – lead; Garry R. Jones – baritone, piano; Christian Davis – bass	Brent Mitchell – tenor; Scott Allen – lead; Garry R. Jones – baritone, piano; Christian Davis – bass

== Discography ==
- Southern Selections Volume I (2004)
- Mercy's Mark Quartet (2004)
- Southern Selections Volume II (2005)
- Something's Happening (2006)

== Radio Hits ==
Information about Southern Gospel radio hits is derived from the Singing News Magazine's National Southern Gospel radio airplay chart

- "I'm On the Battlefield For My Lord" peaked at #18 in March 2005.
- "His Response" peaked at #40.
- "I Got It" peaked at #40.
- "Something's Happening" peaked at #22 in April 2007.
- "When It All Starts Happening I Want to be There" peaked at the #54 position.
