= Kindekrist =

- Origin: Adelaide, South Australia, Australia
- Genres: Christian rock
- Years active: 1970–1998

Formed in 1970, Kindekrist was Australia's first Christian rock band. The band brought together musicians from different musical styles – folk, country rock, classical, pop and rock – and theological traditions (Lutheran, Presbyterian and Methodist). The band's name derived from the German for "Children of Christ", reflecting the Lutheran roots of the lead singer, Robin Mann. It was formed at Scots Church (then Presbyterian) and played regularly in Lutheran, Presbyterian, Methodist, Baptist, Salvation Army, Catholic and Anglican churches, including the weekly student worship service at St Stephen's Lutheran Church, Adelaide.

Kindekrist's music reflected both a concern for issues of social justice as well as expressing more spiritual and religious themes. In this, it paralleled the themes of the contemporary US Jesus Movement, which itself spawned the development of Jesus Music that later evolved into Contemporary Christian Music. Two of the band's members, Robin Mann and John Pryzibilla, were arrested during Australian protests against the Vietnam War, while the band's first drummer, Rev Rod Jepsen, was a leader of the Anti-Apartheid campaign against the 1971 Springbok Rugby Tour of Australia.

With membership changing over the two decades of the band's life, the core performer and composer was Robin Mann. Many of his songs were subsequently included in congregational hymn collections in Australia, the UK, US and elsewhere.

== Discography ==
- Commonplace Forms (Edition One) 1973
- Father Songs (EMI custom pressing) 1974
- Even Stones Can Sing (Good God) 1977 - Tape Cassette only
- Carry Me Home (Move) 1979

None of Kindekrist's recordings are listed in current catalogues, although some appear on auction sites occasionally. Archive copies are stored in the State Library of South Australia.
