= The Miscellaneous =

1990s alternative rock band

The Miscellaneous was a 1990s alternative rock band composed of members from Europe and the United States. The band was fronted by a male and a female vocalist, and produced music that is said to "transcend the boundaries" of its genre in creativity. CCM magazine likened their music to that of Sixpence None the Richer, Jars of Clay and Out of the Grey.

== Background ==
The band began with the trio of Stef Loy (an American), Bo H, and Mangus Sjolander (both Swedes), who were in a band, Perry and the Poor Boys, who released one album, No Fear in Love, under this configuration in 1992. After several years of worldwide tours, the band found themselves back in Sweden. They began adding members, including Sooi Groeneveld van der Laan (Dutch) as vocalist.

Their debut, She Walks Alone With Me, was released in 1994. The song "Black Lips Saturday" was their biggest hit, earning the band airplay in Europe. The band experienced some success through Europe, and the release was picked up by a British label. However, they found roadblocks from the American market, and were unable to book shows due to the diversity of countries that they lived in.

Their second effort was produced by Armand John Petri to build an American-friendly pop sound. According to frontman Stef Loy "Armand... thought we should settle down on the first [U.S.] effort. He helped me relearn how to write pop songs." "He stripped down the music, and we had to rebuild it again." The effort was successful as the band gained the attention of multiple American labels. They eventually signed with Atlanta-based Gray Dot Records, releasing All Good Weeds Grow Up in 1998.

"Do not store up for yourselves treasures on earth, where moth and rust destroy, and where thieves break in and steal.
But store up for yourselves treasures in heaven, where moth and rust do not destroy, and where thieves do not break in and steal."

— Matthew 6:19-20

The band once again produced themselves for the third album, Moth & Rust, released in 1999. According to the band, this record became more of a lyrical than musical an exploration. "Previous CDs have been either therapy for the songwriter or fun lyrical meanderings. This... is the first time I actually have a message [directed toward] the listener," songwriter Stef Loy explained, "Now I’m trying purposely to give the listener something to think about." The albums' title and primary message were taken from Matthew 6:19–20. The album is themed on philosophical and spiritual points such as the decline of morality and absolutes, and hidden dangers in the American Dream.

== Discography ==
- 1994: She Walks Alone With Me (Megaphone Records (Sweden))
- 1998: All Good Weeds Grow Up (Gray Dot Records)
- 1999: Moth & Rust

== Members ==
- Stef Loy - guitar, vocals
- Sooi Groeneveld van der Laan - vocals
- Bo H - guitar
- Mangus Sjolander - drums
- Oyvind Eriksen - bass
- Patric Jonasson - organ
