= The Messenger (painting) =

1674 painting by Jan Verkolje

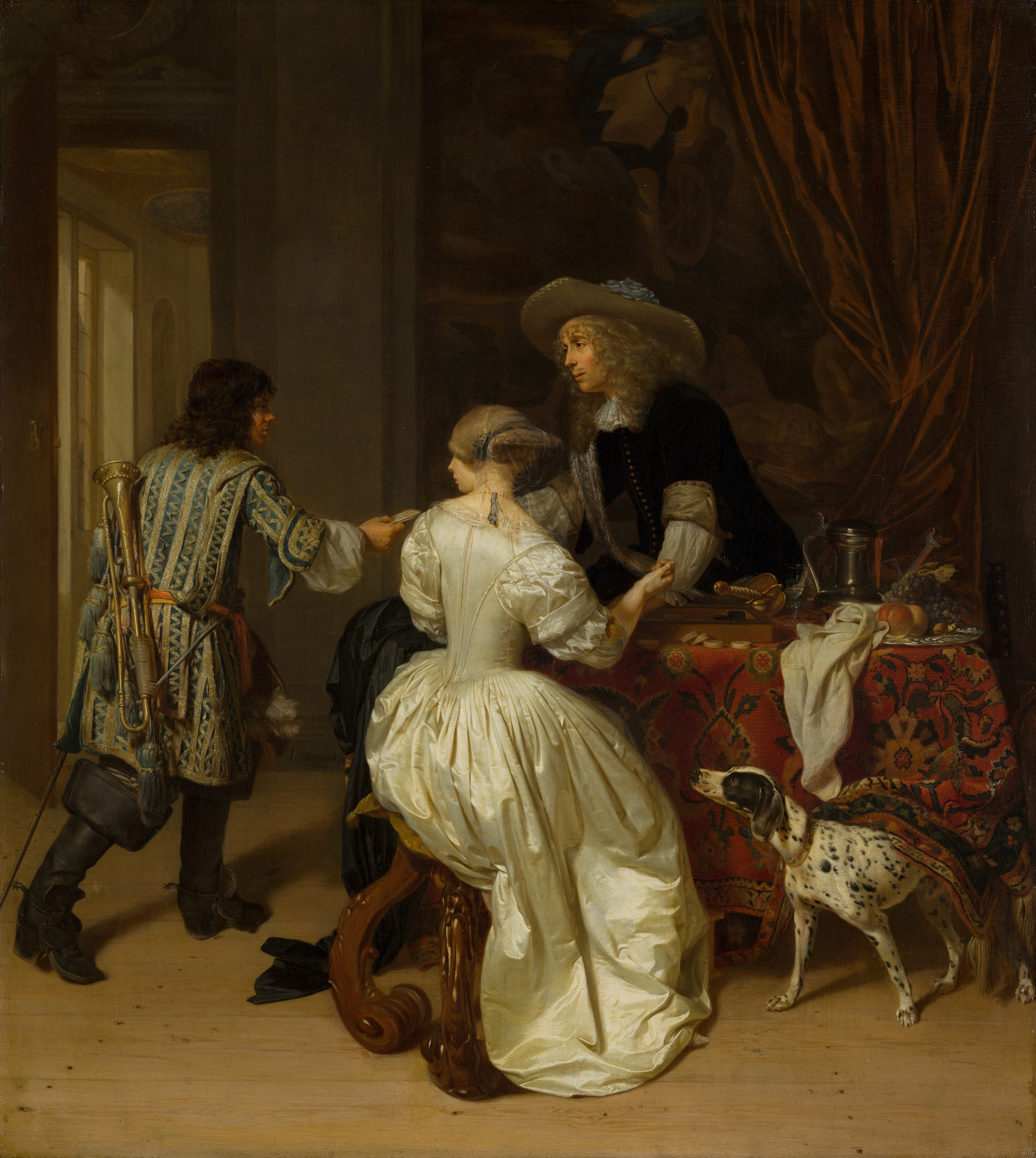
The Messenger (1674) by Johannes Verkolje

The Messenger (Dutch - De boodschapper ('t kan verkeren)) is a 1674 oil painting by Johannes Verkolje which is in the collection of the Mauritshuis, in The Hague.

The picture depicts a messenger delivering a letter to an officer and his female companion who are playing backgammon.

It was owned by Anna Louisa Agatha van Loon-van Winter in Amsterdam until 1877. Its next owners were Alfred de Rothschild and then Victor de Rothschild. It was bought at auction in London on 19 April 1937 by Fritz Mannheimer. In 1941 it was sold through the Dienststelle Mühlmann of the Hague to Arthur Seyss-Inquart. In 1946 it was transferred to the Stichting Nederlands Kunstbezit in the Hague and two years later it was loaned to the Mauritshuis. In 1949 it was transferred to the Dienst voor 's Rijks Verspreide Kunstvoorwerpen in the Hague and finally in 1960 it was permanently transferred to the Mauritshuis.
