= Trace Family Trio =

The Trace Family Trio was a traditional country gospel music group active from 1945 to 1962. The group consisted of Sylvia Trace and her two daughters Darlene and Teena.

== Style ==
The group's style is often compared to the Carter Family, with only a simple guitar accompaniment and occasional piano.

== Discography ==
- Earl Sacred Harmony
