= Rock the Desert =

Christian music festival

Rock The Desert was a Christian music festival held in Midland, Texas, United States, every August. The Last one was in 2019. They took 2020 off and then decided to officially close the festival down.

== Background ==
Rock the Desert began in August 1999 on the parking lot of Holy Trinity Episcopal Church in Midland, Texas. An idea birthed by Jeff Fouts, the associate Rector, to provide a free concert as a project to reach out to the church neighborhood has grown to become an area-wide event.

Since then the festival has been held at Beal Park and its current location on Farm-to-Market Road 1788. The 20th festival, headlined by Skillet was in 2019; as of July 2019 the organisers had agreed to take a break for the following year and had yet to make a decision on whether it would return for 2021.
