= Foolish Things =

American Christian alternative rock band

- Origin: Aurora, Colorado, United States
- Genres: Rock, alternative rock, Christian rock
- Years active: 1997–2008
- Label: Inpop Records
- Members: Mark Labriola II; Isaac Jorgensen; Nate Phillips; Shaul Hagen; James Rightmer

Foolish Things is a rock/alternative rock/Christian rock band previously signed with Inpop Records.

== History ==
The band took their name from 1 Corinthians 1:27–29 "God chose the foolish things of the world to shame the wise".

The band won the coveted Music in the Rockies competition for unknown Christian artists in 2000.

They had been putting out demo CDs and EPs for many years when they released a much anticipated full-length album titled Let's Not Forget the Story on July 18, 2006.

== Farewell Tour – May 2008 ==
After 10 years of working together, during their tour, they announced that they would be disbanding.

Upon releasing their second full-length album in early 2008, the band played their last show in Denver on May 15, 2008 at the Gothic Theatre.

== American Idol ==
Mark Labriola, the group's lead singer, made an appearance on Fox's American Idol in 2010. He was dismissed in the coveted "Hollywood Week."

== Members ==
- Mark Labriola II – Vocals, Background Vocals, Programming
- Isaac Jorgensen – Vocals, Background Vocals, Programming, piano, Acoustic Guitar, electric guitar
- Nate Phillips – Bass guitar
- Shaul Hagen – Drums
- James Rightmer – Background Vocals, Programming, Piano, Acoustic guitar, Keyboard, electric guitar

== Discography ==
=== Albums ===
- Foolish Things (2002)
- Let's Not Forget the Story (2006) Reviews: cmspin Jesus Freak Hideout
- Even Now (2007)

== Singles ==
- Spirit Come (2006)
- Who Can Compare (2007)
