= Staci Frenes =

- Born: Staci M. Groff; 1963 (age 62–63)
- Origin: San Francisco, California, U.S.
- Genre: Christian pop
- Occupations: Singer, songwriter
- Instrument: vocals
- Years active: 1993–present
- Website: stacifrenes.com

Staci M. Frenes (née, Groff) is an American Christian musician, who primarily plays a style of Christian pop music. She has released ten musical works, Mosaic (1997), Staci Frenes (2001), Acoustic Origins (2004), Nothing Short of Amazing (2006), Wise Men and Angels (2006), Meteor Shower (2008), Snapshots (2010), Babies and Weddings (2011), Everything You Love Comes Alive (2012), and Unpathed Waters, Undreamed Shores (2016).

== Early life ==
Frenes was born in San Francisco to Staci M. Groff to Robert and Gail Groff. She received her baccalaureate in English from University of California, Berkeley.

== Music career ==
Her music recording career started in 1993, with her first studio album, Mosaic, releasing in 1997. She has since released nine more albums, Staci Frenes in 2001, Acoustic Origins in 2004, Nothing Short of Amazing in 2006, Wise Men and Angels in 2006, Meteor Shower in 2008, Snapshots in 2010, Babies and Weddings in 2011, Everything You Love Comes Alive in 2012, and Unpathed Waters, Undreamed Shores in 2016.

== Personal life ==
She is married to Abe Frenes, they have two children together, where they reside in the San Francisco, California area.

== Discography ==
- Mosaic (1997)
- Staci Frenes (2001)
- Acoustic Origins (2004)
- Nothing Short of Amazing (2006)
- Wise Men and Angels (2006)
- Meteor Shower (2008)
- Snapshots (2010)
- Babies and Weddings (2011)
- Everything You Love Comes Alive (2012)
- Unpathed Waters, Undreamed Shores (2016)
