= Stryken =

- Stryken pictured in "spiritual armor" (L-R) Ezekiel Vade, Dale Streiker, Steve Strieker, and Joey Knight

Background information
- Origin: Cedar Park, Texas
- Genres: Christian heavy metal, glam metal, hard rock
- Years active: Early 1980s ‒ 1988
- Label: Chrystal Records

Stryken (originally known as Stryker) was a 1980s Christian heavy metal/hard rock band based in the north Austin, Texas suburb of Cedar Park. Using stage names, the group consisted of Dale Streiker (vocals, lead guitar), Stephen Strieker (vocals, rhythm guitar), Joey Knight (drums), and Ezekiel Vade (bass guitar).

Often characterized as a mere clone of Stryper (another more prominent Christian metal band popular at the time), Stryken issued several releases on their own private label, Crystal Records, including the 1986 12" single with the tracks, "Rock On" and "Surprise", and the 1987 full-length album, First Strike (which has since been reissued with previously unreleased material).

The band's lyrics made prominent use of Biblical verses such as the anthemic song, "Crush the Head of Satan", which was a reference to the Old Testament prophetical verse of Genesis 3:15 and the New Testament verse of Romans 16:20. Many believed that the song's figuratively violent lyrics promoted actual physical violence which the band did not deny but rather affirmed with the statement that any such violence was "well directed".

In June 1987, the members of Stryken were detained by police after disrupting a Mötley Crüe concert in San Antonio, Texas. Carrying a large wooden cross and clad in full body armor (inspired by the theological teaching of the "Armor of God" as found in the sixth chapter of the New Testament book, Ephesians), Stryken first proselytized concertgoers outside of the venue and then proceeded inside to the front of the stage. After being detained by police, the band was released without charges.

The members of Stryken all used stage names to conceal their true identities. One of the members of Stryken, stage name, Stephen Streiker, (birth name, Stephen Hopkins) has gone on to "repent" of his career in "Christian rock", which he now refers to as, "a contradiction of terms". Today Hopkins serves as an elder and pastor of a "family-integrated" reformed Baptist church in Burnet, Texas, and is the father of sixteen children. He also authored the book, The Cult of Jabez, and the falling away of the church in America.
