= Verlag Der Strom =

Verlag Der Strom is a small Christian publisher located in Stuttgart, Germany, which started around 1973. The company mainly publishes the writings of Watchman Nee (1903-1972), a Chinese author known in evangelical Christianity. The emphasis of all the publications is on the person and experience of Christ and the building up of the church. Most of these Books are in German language.

French translations are published with the cooperation of Le Fleuve de Vie (Neuchatel, Switzerland)Le Fleuve de Vie (Neuchâtel, Switzerland), and in Italian by Il Fiume di Vita (Bolzano, Italy).
