= Nuestro Pan Diario =

Protestant Christian publication in several languages

Nuestro Pan Diario (Spanish, 'Our Daily Bread') is a devotional publication by the RBC Ministries. It is available in more than 35 languages, and is a Christian Devotional with one of the highest circulations in the world. Since its first publication in 1956, Nuestro Pan Diario has been teaching generations of Christians about the Bible and what it means to lead a Christian life.

Every day of the year has a biblical passage, next to an appropriate story. The publication also includes biblical verses to read so that one can read the Bible in a single year.
