= The Messengers Choir =

The Messengers Choir was an East African gospel group based in the United States. Before the break-up they were considered the first gospel choir of African origin to be formed and based in the United States.

The group was formed in New Jersey, USA. The 30+ member ensemble blended elements of African gospel and American popular music. The group was an integral part of the Allegheny East Conference Seventh-day Adventist Church Festivals.
