= Acappella Vocal Band =

American vocal group

Acappella Vocal Band (AVB) was a vocal group put together by Keith Lancaster in 1986 to augment the vocal group Acappella. AVB's popularity and ministry quickly grew, prompting Lancaster to launch AVB as a full-time touring group in 1988. AVB went through various lineup and stylistic changes before disbanding in 2000.

In addition to their early duties as Acappella's opening act and augmentation group, AVB performed and recorded as an independent ensemble. Many of their recordings, which included Give Me Light (1987) and Steppin' On A Cloud (1988), were later re-released on a CD titled The Early Years. In June 1988, with Acappella's expansion to a quartet, AVB branched off to tour on their own under the auspices of Acappella Ministries. Both groups underwent a shift in musical style during this period. Whereas previously, they had covered traditional hymns, praise songs and contemporary Christian pop music, both Acappella and AVB now recorded and performed primarily original music, much of which was composed by Lancaster. Acappella forged ahead with an adult contemporary sound while AVB targeted the youth market.

With Song In My Soul (1989), AVB made a major shift toward contemporary pop, rock and R&B sounds, though still entirely produced a cappella. On What's Your Tag Say?, the shift toward slick hip-hop and R&B was even greater, with a strong lyrical focus on the youth market and extensive choreography incorporated into their live performances. By the time Celebrate And Party became popular, the transformation to a near-perfect a cappella mimicry of the new jack swing style had been achieved, with a sound similar to Take 6, Boyz II Men, and Tony! Toni! Toné!. The song U & Me & God Make 5 followed in 1993, producing a hit on the CCM charts. The AVB lineup of John K. Green, Brishan Hatcher, Wes McKinzie, Max Plaster and Steve Reischl also recorded AVB's Spanish project, Caminando en la Luz (1994), and "greatest hits" compilation, The Road (1995).

After a brief hiatus, AVB returned with a different lineup for Way of Life and yet another lineup and sound for Real. Almost 30 former AVB members reunited in Nashville for a concert in July 2009, followed by another reunion concert in Nashville in July 2012.

AVB returned to the concert stage for Acappella Ministries' New Year's Bash in December 2024 with a lineup featuring Chad Bahr, Tony Brown, Todd Dunaway, Michael Forehand, Brishan Hatcher, Chris Lindsey, Wes McKinzie, Jeremy Swindle, and Bret Testerman. A similar lineup, joined by former member Steve Reischl, will sing at the 2025 New Year's Bash in Nashville.

== Group formations ==
1986–1987	1987	1987-1988
Terry Cheatham – tenor; David Fletcher – lead; Dale Carpenter – baritone; Dale Cal – bass; Jay Smith – utility/beatbox	Terry Cheatham – tenor; Bret Testerman – lead; Dale Carpenter – baritone; Dale Cal – bass; Jay Smith – utility/beatbox	Terry Cheatham – tenor; Bret Testerman – lead; Shannon Beasley – baritone; Todd Austin – bass; Jay Smith – utility/beatbox
1989	1989-1990	1990–1991
Terry Cheatham – tenor; Bret Testerman – lead; Danny Elliott – baritone; Wes McKinzie – bass; Jay Smith – utility/beatbox	Max Plaster – tenor; Bret Testerman – lead; George Gee – baritone; Wes McKinzie – bass; Jay Smith – utility/beatbox	Max Plaster – tenor; George Gee – lead; Jay Smith – baritone; Wes McKinzie – bass
1991–1992	1992-1993	1993-1995
Max Plaster – tenor; John K. Green – lead; Brian Randolph – baritone; Wes McKinzie – bass; Jay Smith – utility/beatbox	Max Plaster – tenor; John K. Green – lead; Brian Randolph – baritone; Wes McKinzie – bass; Brishan Hatcher – utility/beatbox	Max Plaster – tenor; John K. Green – lead; Steve Reischl – baritone; Wes McKinzie – bass; Brishan Hatcher – utility/beatbox
1995-1996	1996–1997	1997–1998
Kevin Schaffer – tenor; Brishan Hatcher – lead; Aaron Herman – baritone; Tim Storms – bass	Brishan Hatcher – tenor; Aaron Herman – lead; Andrew McNeal – baritone; Josh Harrison – bass	Brishan Hatcher – tenor; Aaron Herman – lead; Luke Brown – baritone; Josh Harrison – bass
1998-2000
Jeremy Swindle – tenor; Chris Lindsey – lead; Chad Bahr – baritone; Todd Dunaway – bass; Tony Brown – utility/beatbox

=== In Memorian ===
- Andrew McNeal (d. November 2011) Worked as operator manager for a company in Washington D.C. Recorded a solo album entitled "The Lord is Blessing Me."
- Terry Cheatham (d. August 2018) Worked as a counselor and Professor of Psychology at Lipscomb University in Nashville, TN.
- Brian Randolph (d. January 2020) Former worship minister at First Street Church in Dumas, TX, and Altamesa Church of Christ in Fort Worth, TX.
- John K. Green (d. November 3, 2020) Singer/songwriter/producer in Los Angeles, CA. John was diagnosed with cancer in 2016.

== Discography ==
The labels are taken from the original releases; many of the albums have been re-released with new distributors.

- Give Me Light (1987, Clifty Records)
- Steppin' On A Cloud (1988, Clifty Records)
- Song In My Soul (1989, Clifty Records)
- A Savior Is Born! (1989, Clifty Records, with Acappella)
- What's Your Tag Say? (1991, Word)
- Celebrate And Party (1992, Word)
- U And Me And God Make 5 (1993, Word)
- Caminando en la Luz (1994, Word)
- The Road (1995, The Acappella Company)
- Way Of Life (1996, The Acappella Company)
- Real (1999, The Acappella Company)
- The Early Years (2002, The Acappella Company)

AVB also appeared on numerous other recording projects for the Acappella Company (Acappella Series, Acappella Praise and Worship, Acappella Scripture Songs, Keith Lancaster solo projects) and made three video projects: Song In My Soul (1989), Video Party (1993), and The Land of Five (1994).
