= Gospel Hall Assemblies =

Group of independent Christian assemblies

The Gospel Halls are a group of independent Christian assemblies throughout the world that fellowship with each other through a set of shared Biblical doctrines and practices. Theologically, they are evangelical and dispensational. They are a conservative strand of the Open Brethren movement and tend to only collaborate with other assemblies when there is doctrinal agreement.

Christians who meet in Gospel Halls generally hold that a scriptural Christian assembly should avoid the use of a "sectarian" name (the name "Gospel Hall Assemblies" is a Wikipedia designation, and they are often called “Plymouth Brethren”, though members of this tradition are not in communion with other Plymouth Brethren who organized the Plymouth Brethren Christian Church). They typically describe themselves simply as "Christians" gathered to the name of the Lord Jesus rather than adopting a denominational title, which has been a long-standing practice.

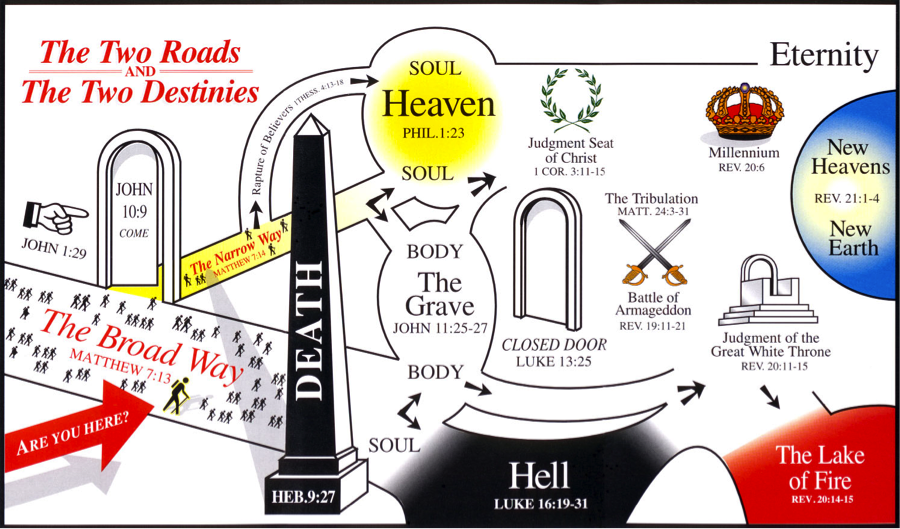
The "Two Roads Chart" is displayed in many Gospel Halls.

== History ==
According to Acts 2:42 of the Bible, the first assembly of Christians commenced in Jerusalem around AD32. Gospel Hall assemblies consider this to be their true roots in a spiritual sense. As Christianity spread throughout the Near Eastern world, other churches were planted in new locations (see Revelation chapters 2–3). Two popular books among Gospel Halls – The Pilgrim Church by E.H. Broadbent and Church History by Andrew Miller make the claim that throughout the centuries of church history, there has always been a remnant independent evangelical testimony, and that the modern Gospel Hall movement, which began in the 1800s, with hundreds of new independent assemblies appearing almost simultaneously in various places around the world (particularly in Ireland, Scotland, England, and continental Europe) was a recovery of numerous New Testament beliefs and practices which had been largely lost in Christendom over the centuries. One book discussing this phenomenon is an anonymous work called Assembly Life Experiences by "an old disciple", recording the story of a group of Christians who were converted in the 1859 revival in Scotland. Through reading only their Bibles they concluded that clericalism and denominationalism were unscriptural and subsequently met together to break bread and depend on God for gifting and leadership.

During the Revival of 1859 which affected much of Northern Ireland and Scotland, "exercised" (stirred in spirit) evangelists, such as Alexander Marshall, Donald Ross and Donald Munro, crossed the Atlantic to preach the gospel, leading to numerous assemblies being planted in United States and Canada. Norman Crawford has documented this story in a chapter of his book Assembly Truth published by Gospel Tract Publications (Glasgow, 1994). (See also J.J. Rouse for information on an early Canadian Gospel Hall pioneer). Currently, there are hundreds of Gospel Halls worldwide.

== Doctrinal beliefs ==
Gospel Halls claim to follow the pattern of New Testament church doctrine and practice found in the Acts of the Apostles and expounded by the Apostle Paul in his epistles, notably 1 Corinthians and 1 Timothy. Assemblies meeting in Gospel Halls do not usually print an official statement of faith, but rather, prefer to reference the Bible alone as their authority. The following basic doctrines would be held very widely among them:

=== Bibliology ===
- The verbal, plenary inspiration of the Bible (all 66 books, but not the Apocrypha)
- Biblical inerrancy
- Sola scriptura

=== Theology ===
- There is one God existing as three co-equal and co-eternal divine persons – Father, Son and Holy Spirit.

=== Creation ===
- The creation of the world and human beings is a supernatural act of God

=== Christology ===
- Virgin birth of Christ
- Christ is both fully God and fully man (See also -- Hypostatic union)
- Christ is the eternal Son of the Father
- Christ was/is perfectly sinless and impeccable
- Christ is the Head of the universal Church

=== Soteriology ===
- All humanity is universally condemned as a result of the fall in Eden
- Faith in Christ and His substitutionary death and bodily resurrection are the basis of salvation
- The new birth is required for sinners to be made right with God
- Justification by grace alone, through faith alone, in Christ alone
- Baptism is by immersion in water as a public declaration after personal faith. Baptism contributes nothing to salvation.

=== Pneumatology ===
- The Holy Spirit indwells believers immediately upon conversion
- The ministry of the Holy Spirit in conversion, sanctification, and witnessing

=== Ecclesiology ===
- Two aspects of "the Church" – firstly the "body of Christ" composed of all believers from Pentecost to the return of Christ, and secondly local assemblies composed of baptized believers who have been received into fellowship.
- No ordained or salaried ministers/priests/pastors
- Each assembly is an autonomous locally functioning body of baptized believers
- Local assemblies are led by a plurality of pastors/elders and acknowledged
- There is no central ecclesiastical authority, formal creed, or prescribed liturgy. Although a formal liturgy is not adopted or acknowledged, the generally assumed liturgy follows what is known as the "open meeting," consisting of prayer, bible reading, hymns, and partaking of the Lord's Supper (also referred to as "communion" amongst many denominations), which is common in Open Brethren assemblies.

=== Eschatology ===
- Dispensational
- Pretribulational rapture
- Premillennial return of Christ to the earth
- Eternal kingdom bliss for the believer and eternal damnation for the unbeliever

== Assembly practices ==
- Visitors seeking assembly fellowship are required to either bring a "letter of commendation" or have an interview with the elders before being allowed to participate in certain assembly activities such as the Lord's Supper.
- Numerous hymn books are in wide circulation among Gospel Halls such as The Believer's Hymn Book, Hymns of Light and Love, The Gospel Hymn Book and others. New publications of hymnbooks include "The New Believer's Hymnbook."
- North American assemblies generally refrain from using musical accompaniment in worship.

In most Gospel Halls the following weekly meetings are convened at varying times, and may be combined:

- The breaking of bread or Lord's Supper (once a week, always on Sunday)
- Sunday school
- Gospel preaching meeting (distinct from a revival meeting in that they are a regular weekly meeting, held by a local or visiting speaker)
- Prayer meeting
- Bible teaching/study meeting (often referred to as a "Ministry Meeting")
- Bible study (often referred to as the "Bible Reading")

== Evangelism and teaching ==
Gospel Halls around the world are involved in spreading the gospel of Christ through various means including public preaching, literature work, Bible exhibitions, Sunday schools, radio programmes, prison and school visitation, hospital work and gospel tent meetings during the summer months. Distribution of gospel tracts, gospel calendars and other evangelistic material is commonplace as well as open-air preaching. With thousands of assemblies and with many hundreds of full-time itinerant evangelists, missionaries and Bible teachers, the enterprise of spreading the message of Jesus Christ and upholding the fundamental truths of the Bible continues as the vision of Christians gathering in Gospel Halls worldwide. During the last half of the 20th century and into the 21st century, while shrinkage was a feature in Europe, expansion was seen in numerous places, notably Canada, South and Central America and Mexico.

Conferences are a significant feature of life among Gospel Halls. Many Gospel Halls will host an annual conference to which visitors will be invited to come and hear Bible teaching. Typically in the UK these will be one-day events, whereas in North America they will span a whole weekend. In Scotland, the New Year period is a popular time for conferences. The Easter weekend is also popular for conferences, with notable ones in Belfast, Toronto and Vancouver, as well as some Latin American countries such as Venezuela and Guatemala. Residential Bible study weeks are also carried out among Gospel Halls throughout the world.

Recordings of Bible teaching from conferences in Gospel Halls are available on numerous localised Gospel Hall websites and on some central audio collection sites.

== Buildings ==
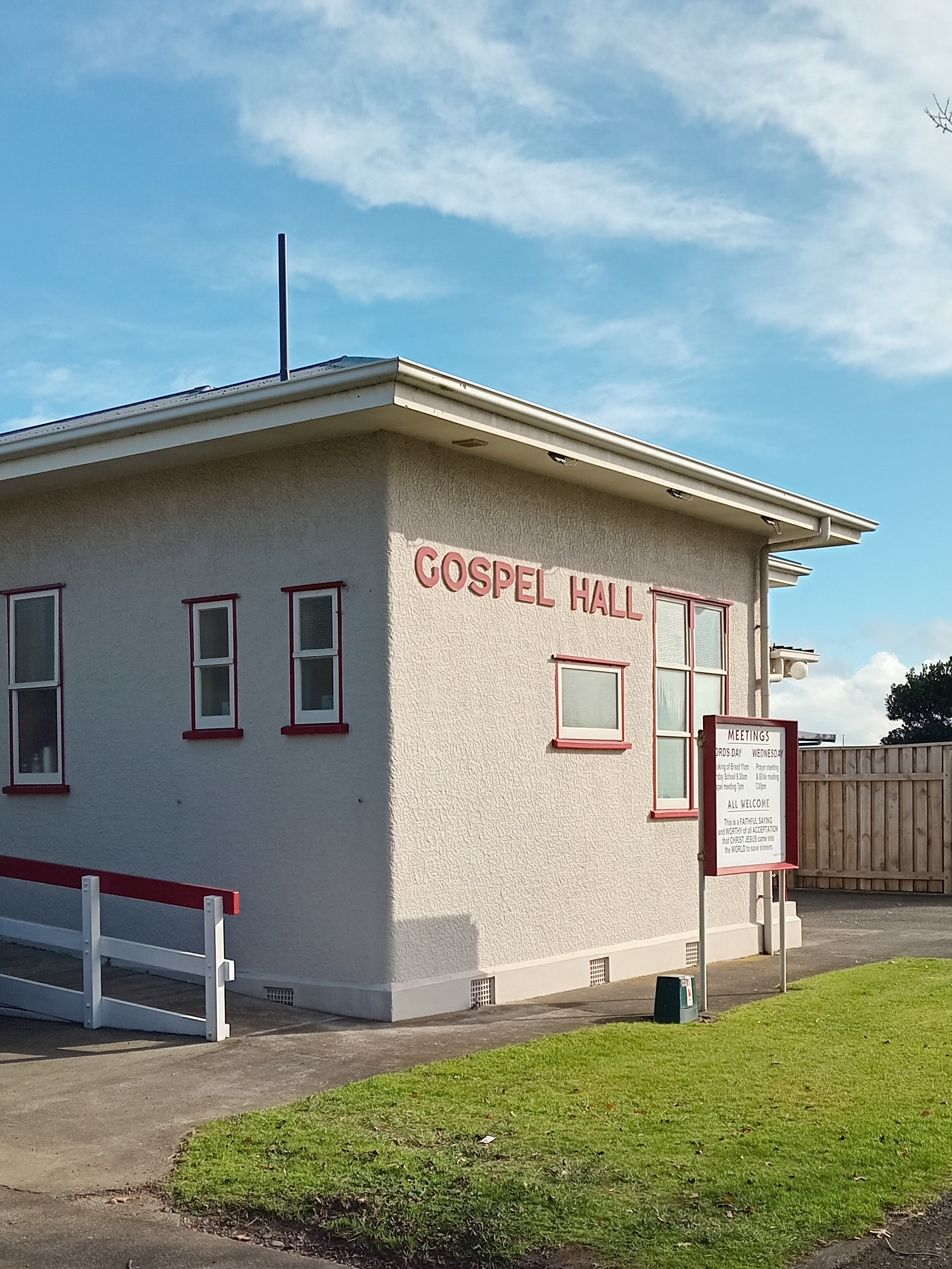
A Gospel Hall in Palmerston North, New Zealand

Holding that the biblical word ἐκκλησία (ekklēsia, Greek for "church") refers to people, not a building, they avoid calling their buildings "churches," preferring to use the title "Gospel Hall" to indicate that the gospel is preached and upheld within. They place little emphasis on their actual church buildings, not considering them to be sacred, and many of the buildings take other names, for example Bethesda Hall, Main Street Hall, Hebron Hall, Gospel Centre, or Believer's Meeting Room. In England and Wales, several buildings named "Gospel Hall" are registered for worship under some Brethren designation, however, the name "Gospel Hall" has also been used by Presbyterian and conservative Pentecostals.

== Publications ==
Literature has always been emphasized among Gospel Halls. The Scottish publisher John Ritchie Ltd. publishes material from authors connected with Gospel Halls, as well as publishing The Believer's Magazine, a monthly periodical that has a wide circulation among these assemblies. Other well-known magazines read by Christians in these assemblies are Assembly Testimony, Present Truth and Precious Seed., as well as the mission magazine published by the mission support agency Echoes International, which began in 1872. In the US and Canada, the magazine most widely circulated among Gospel Halls is Truth and Tidings. Missionary magazines such as Look on the Fields and Horizons are also much used.
