= Everman (band) =

American Christian rock band

- Origin: Nashville, Tennessee, United States
- Genres: Christian rock
- Years active: 1996–2004
- Labels: BEC Recordings
- Past members: Brad Miles; Marcus Yoars; Alan Carpenter; Chris Brush; Glen Kimberlin; Shannon Hinkle; Craig Hinkle; David Dewese; Rich Way; Zach Fisher

Everman was a Christian rock band signed to BEC Recordings. According to Brad Miles, he came up with the band's name while driving through the city of Everman, Texas.

When Glen Kimberlin and Chris Brush left in 2004 to pursue studio session work they were replaced by Rich Way (bass) and Zach Fisher (drums). David Dewese (guitar) replaced Marcus Yoars, who went on to become Associate Editor of Plugged In Magazine.

Brad Miles is currently the Coordinator of Student Activities at Wayland Baptist University and the Pastor of Stonebridge Fellowship in Plainview, Texas.

== Discography ==
- Everman (2003)
