= House to House Heart to Heart =

American Christian magazine

- Frequency: Monthly
- Circulation: 2,500,000 every 2 months
- Founded: 1994
- Country: USA
- Based in: Chattanooga, TN
- Language: English
- Website: www.housetohouse.com

House to House Heart to Heart (HTH) is a monthly American magazine. HTH is a customizable, 8-page, color, Christian magazine that works exclusively with Churches of Christ. The publication is printed every month for a total of 12 issues a year and is directly mailed into homes. Each issue contains gospel lessons and biblical stories. HTH is printed in English, French, Korean, and Spanish.

HTH is under the oversight of the elders at the East Ridge Church of Christ in Chattanooga, Tennessee. Allen Webster is the managing editor. Luke Griffin is director of operations. Matt Wallin is director of promotions.

== History ==
HTH started in 1994 with one congregation mailing out 1,000 copies. The editors are currently working with 4,500 congregations to send out around 2,500,000 copies into households each issue.

== Circulation ==
House to House Heart to Heart Magazine Circulation by Year
Year	1999	2000	2001	2002	2003	2004	2005	2006	2007	2008	2009	2010	2011	2012	2013	2014	2015	2016	2017	2018	2019	2020	2021	2022	2023	2024
Circulation (millions)	1.9	3.45	5.06	6.49	8.25	10.60	11.99	13.40	14.80	16.46	16.04	15.82	15.38	14.38	14.81	14.92	13.68	14.53	15.28	15.60	15.17	14.42	13.54	13.41	13.09	13.92

The magazine has an online archive with the text for every article published. https://www.housetohouse.com/print-archives/ The articles are indexed by volume and issue number.

== House to House School of Evangelism ==
In June 2018, House to House launched the House to House School of Evangelism, directed by Rob Whitacre, "Teaching the Saved to Teach the Lost." As of 2024, the traveling school of Evangelism has trained 240 churches of Christ in the United States.

== House to House Studios ==
In 2024, House to House launched House to House Studios. House to House studios is the hope of “Light for the Way,” featuring Charles Cochran on WFLI Channel 53 at 10:30 a.m. every Sunday. House to House Studios also produces the Sisters Podcast, The Spiritual Sword Podcast, and Make it Plain.

== Spiritual Sword ==
On October 1, 2023, it was announced that House to House would take over production and publication of the Spiritual Sword, founded in 1969, and the annual Spiritual Sword lectures.
