= Fireflight discography =

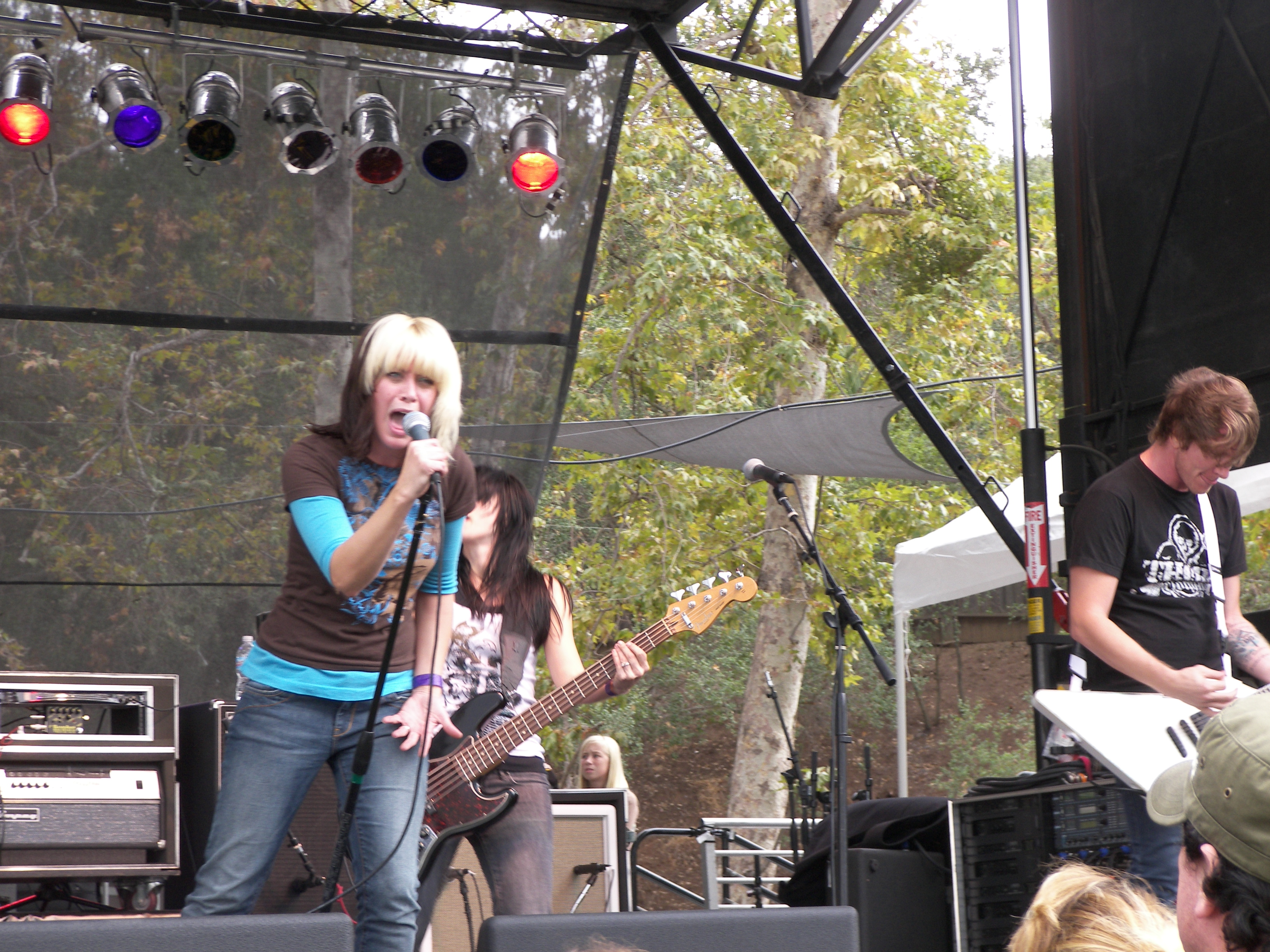
- Studio albums: 5
- Extended plays: 2
- Singles: 17

The discography of Fireflight, a Christian rock band, which consists of 1 independent album, 5 studio albums, 2 independent EPs and 17 singles.

== Albums ==
=== Independent ===
- Glam-rök (2002)

=== Studio ===
List of albums, with selected chart positions and certifications
Title	Album details	Peak chart positions					Certifications
Title	Album details	US	US Alt	US Christ	US Indie	US Rock	Certifications
The Healing of Harms	Released: July 25, 2006; Label: Flicker Records; Format: CD, digital download	—	—	37	48	—	
Unbreakable	Released: March 4, 2008; Label: Flicker Records; Format: CD, digital download	— (Note: Unbreakable did not enter the Billboard 200, but peaked at number 10 on the Billboard Top Heatseekers)	—	15	33	—	
For Those Who Wait	Released: February 9, 2010; Label: Flicker Records; Format: CD, digital download	96	16	5	—	24	
Now	Released: March 6, 2012; Label: Essential Records; Format: CD, digital download	51	9	1	7	14	
Innova	Released: May 5, 2015; Label: The Fuel Records; Format: CD, digital download	—	18	10	14	27	
Who We Are: The Head and the Heart	Released October 23, 2020; Label: RockFest Records; Format: CD, digital download	—	—	—	—	—	

=== EPs ===
- On the Subject of Moving Forward (2004)

List of albums, with selected chart positions and certifications
Title	Album details
Unbroken and Unplugged	Released: September 8, 2009; Label: Independent; Format: CD, digital download
Re•Imag•Innova	Released: March 3, 2017; Label: Play It Loud; Format: digital download

== Singles ==
Year	Single	Peak chart positions			Album
Year	Single	US Christ	US Christ Rock	US Christ CHR	Album
2006	"You Decide" (featuring Josh Brown of Day of Fire)	27	1	10	The Healing of Harms
2006	"Waiting"	—	1	—	The Healing of Harms
2007	"It's You"	—	—	—	The Healing of Harms
2007	"Star of the Show"	—	—	—	The Healing of Harms
2007	"Attitude"	—	—	—	The Healing of Harms
2008	"Unbreakable"	24	1	14	Unbreakable
2008	"Brand New Day"	27	—	—	Unbreakable
2008	"The Hunger"	—	1	—	Unbreakable
2008	"You Gave Me a Promise"	—	10	—	Unbreakable
2009	"Stand Up"	—	1	—	Unbreakable
2009	"Desperate"	33	1	4	For Those Who Wait
2010	"For Those Who Wait"	44	5	10	For Those Who Wait
2010	"All I Need to Be"	—	—	—	For Those Who Wait
2010	"What I've Overcome"	31	14	—	For Those Who Wait
2011	"Stay Close"	34	1	12	Now
2012	"He Weeps"	50	—	—	Now
2012	"Stronger Than You Think"	—	9	—	Now
2015	"Resuscitate"	—	—	62	Innova
2015	"We Are Alive"	27	54	20	Innova
2015	"Safety" (featuring Stephen Christian of Anberlin)	—	—	7	Innova
2015	"Lightning"	—	—	32	Innova
2015	"This Is Our Time"	33	23	20	Innova
2015	"Light Inside"	21	87	3	Innova
2016	"Out of My Head"	—	—	2	Innova
2018	"I Won't Look Back"	—	31	—	non-album single
2018	"Die Free" (featuring Kevin Young of Disciple)	—	24	8	non-album single
2020	"Who We Are"	—	— (Note: "Who We Are" did not enter the Billboard Christian Rock due to the chart being discontinued in 2019, but peaked at No. 5 on ChristianRock.net)	—	Who We Are: The Head and the Heart
2021	"Keep Your Head Up"	—	—	—	Who We Are: The Head and the Heart
