= Flicker Rocks Harder =

Compilation album by Various artists
- Released: May 4, 2004
- Genre: Christian rock; metalcore; post-hardcore
- Label: Flicker

Flicker Rocks Harder is a compilation album from Flicker Records.

== Track listing ==
1. "Bring Me Down" - Pillar - 3:32
2. "Moving Mountains" - Kids in the Way - 3:06
3. "Pop" - Staple - 2:52
4. "Khampa Nomads" - Mortal Treason - 5:33
5. "Lose It Again" - Everyday Sunday - 2:48
6. "Steal the Show" - Stereo Motion - 3:02
7. "Under The Sun" - The Swift - 3:48
8. "Emotion" - Subseven - 2:54
9. "The Truth Hurts" - Fed Up - 3:28
10. "We Are" - Kids in the Way - 3:04
11. "The Songwriter" - Staple - 3:36
12. "Tip Of My Tongue" - Stereo Motion - 3:17
13. "Mess With Your Mind" - Everyday Sunday - 2:32
14. "Revolution" - The Swift - 2:42
15. "Game Of Love" - Subseven - 2:24
16. "When Looking Back" - Fed Up - 3:45
17. "War Within" - Mortal Treason - 3:45
