= List of phoenixes in popular culture =

Cultural depictions of the phoenix

Phoenixes have proved an enduring allegorical symbol, symbolizing rebirth, renewal or uniqueness and often appearing in modern popular culture.

== In literature ==
- Classical references to the phoenix include the Greek historian Herodotus, the Latin poet Ovid, the Latin historian Tacitus, and one of the early Christian Apostolic Fathers, the First Epistle of Clement.
- William Shakespeare frequently mentions the bird in his plays, and also wrote the poem The Phoenix and the Turtle.
- In certain works of Renaissance literature, the phoenix is said to have been eaten as the rarest of dishes, as only one was alive at any one time. Ben Jonson, in Volpone (1605), III, vii. 204-5 wrote: 'could we get the phœnix, though nature lost her kind, shee were our dish.' Another mention of the phoenix as a culinary delicacy occurs in John Webster's The White Devil (1612).
- Edith Nesbit's children's novel The Phoenix and the Carpet is based on the phoenix and its friendship with a family of children.
- The Vermilion Bird is one of the Four Symbols of the Chinese constellations.
- D. H. Lawrence frequently used the phoenix as a symbol for rebirth in life. The Cambridge Edition of the Letters and Works of D. H. Lawrence carries the motif on its covers.
- In Robert E. Howard's tale of King Conan of Aquilonia, "The Phoenix on the Sword", the supernatural scribe Epimetreus inscribes a mystical Phoenix symbol on the blade of Conan's broadsword, to aid against a supernatural enemy.
- Edward Ormondroyd's children's novel David and the Phoenix features the phoenix as a main character.
- In C. S. Lewis's book The Magician's Nephew, a marvellous bird guards an Eden-like garden. It appears later, and is identified as a phoenix, in The Last Battle.
- The phoenix was also famed for being a symbol of the rise and fall of society, Montag and Faber in Ray Bradbury's Fahrenheit 451. The pattern of a complacent and abusive society's destruction yielding a fresh new start was compared to the Phoenix's mythological pattern of resurrection.
- Sylvia Plath alludes to the phoenix in the end of her poem "Lady Lazarus".
- In TJ Klune's The House in the Cerulean Sea the master of the orphanage of Marsyas island, Arthur Parnassus, is revealed to be a phoenix.
- J. K. Rowling's Harry Potter novels feature a phoenix named Fawkes. In the setting of Harry Potter, phoenixes can carry enormous weights, and their song is said to strike fear into the hearts of the impure and courage into those who are pure of heart. The tears of the phoenix can heal severe poisoning, and other illnesses and injuries. The wands of both Harry and Voldemort contain feathers from Fawkes. In addition, Harry Potter and the Order of the Phoenix features the titular Order of the Phoenix, founded by Albus Dumbledore to oppose Voldemort and the Death Eaters.
- In Neil Gaiman's short story "Sunbird", a party of Epicureans answer the question of what happens when a Phoenix is roasted and eaten; the eater bursts into flames, and 'the years burn off [them]'. This can kill those who are inexperienced, but those who have swallowed fire and practised with glow-worms can achieve eternal youth.
- In Terry Pratchett's novel Carpe Jugulum, the search for the phoenix forms an important side plot.
- In Phoenix Rising by Karen Hesse, Trent mentions the Phoenix several times while he is lying in bed, and the main character questions Trent multiple times about the Phoenix and its background.
- In Steven Brust's books set in the world of Dragaera, the House of the Phoenix is linked biologically to the phoenix and metaphorically to the theme of rebirth. Phoenix and The Phoenix Guards are the titles of two of Brust's books, in the Vlad Taltos series and the Khaavren Romances, respectively.
- Catherine Asaro's near future thriller The Phoenix Code features an AI version of the phoenix mythology.
- Sylvia Townsend Warner's short story "The Phoenix" centers around a phoenix that a nobleman obtained for his aviary, and the commercialization thereof after his death.
- In the SCP Foundation collaborative writing project, SCP-5467 is described as a species of bird which is capable of breathing fire in order to kill and cook its prey. When members of this species die, they combust into a brilliant blue flame, leaving behind ashes, which were historically used as a mind-altering drug.

== In music ==
- In Mozart's opera Così fan tutte, a faithful woman is said to be as hard to find as the mythological Phoenix.
- In her song "Troy" from her first album The Lion and the Cobra (1987), Sinéad O'Connor sings "But I will rise, I will return, the phoenix from the flame".
- Bulgarian pop-folk artist Gloria wrote a song called "Feniks" (in Bulgarian - "Феникс", literally translated as phoenix).
- The second track of the album Immortal by Pyramaze is named "Year of the Phoenix".
- Phoenix was the intended title of the album (Untitled) (1970) by The Byrds.
- Transsylvania Phoenix is the name of a Romanian rock band with folkloric lyrics.
- The logo of the British band Queen has a picture of a phoenix on the top part. The logo was designed by lead singer Freddie Mercury.
- In the song "Grey Seal" by Elton John, a phoenix bird is mentioned: "If the phoenix bird can fly, then so can I".
- Rock groups Thirty Seconds to Mars, Lostprophets, and Mike Mangione & The Union all have a phoenix as their official logo.
- Phoenix is the name of a French indie pop–rock band.
- La Fenice ("The Phoenix") is an Opera house in Venice, Italy. It burned down twice in 1836 and in 1996, only to be rebuilt, likening it to its mythical namesake.
- The alternative rock band Live makes reference in the song "The Dolphin's Cry" saying "this phoenix rises up from the ground, when all these wars are over". The Phoenix is used in this context to help symbolize the cycles of love and sexual union being reborn over and over again.
- The post-hardcore band Senses Fail has at the end of their song "(Bite to Break Skin) the Verse". "The phoenix will die inside the firestorm".
- One of the most famous songs by progressive rock band Wishbone Ash is entitled "Phoenix", which tells of a Phoenix being reborn from the ashes.
- The underground hip hop group Unspoken Heard mentions the phoenix in the song "Dream Birth".
- The rock band AFI has a song and EP titled "The Days of the Phoenix".
- Christian rock band Kids in the Way has a song "Phoenix with a Heartache" on their debut album Safe from the Losing Fight (2003).
- On the album I've Been Expecting You (1998) by Robbie Williams, a song called "Phoenix From the Flames" is the fourth track.
- Phoenix is the title song of a 1979 double-platinum album by American singer-songwriter Dan Fogelberg; the cover features a representation of a phoenix bird.
- The Dropper (2000), an album by the experimental jazz-fusion trio Medeski Martin & Wood, features a phoenix as part of the cover art.
- The heavy metal band Trivium mention 'Phoenix' and 'ascending above the ashes of the world I once knew' in the song "Ascendancy"; a reference to Judas is also made in the same song.
- In the song "Call the Shots" by Girls Aloud, the phoenix and its powers of re-creation are mentioned: "Out of the fire that burns inside me / A phoenix is rising".
- French electronic music duo Daft Punk has a song called "Phoenix".
- Finnish power metal band Stratovarius has a song called "Phoenix" from their album Infinite (2000).
- In "Right Between the Eyes", a song by alternative rock band Garbage on their album Bleed Like Me (2005), lead vocalist Shirley Manson sings, "Stick it to them like a phoenix rise."
- In the "Diamonds from Sierra Leone" remix by Kanye West, Jay-Z raps "people lined up to see the Titanic sinkin' instead we rose from the ashes like a phoenix".
- In "Thou Shalt Always Kill" by Dan Le Sac vs Scroobius Pip, Scroobius Pip raps "Thou shalt spell the word 'phoenix' P-H-E-O-N-I-X not P-H-O-E-N-I-X, regardless of what the Oxford English Dictionary tells you".
- The Finnish singer Tarja Turunen has a song called "My Little Phoenix" from her album My Winter Storm (2007).
- The hip hop duo Cannibal Ox refers to themselves as phoenixes in the song "Scream Phoenix" on their debut album The Cold Vein (2001).
- Ani DiFranco's song (covered by Alana Davis) "32 Flavors" contains the line "God help you if you are a phoenix and you dare to rise up from the ash; a thousand eyes will smolder with jealousy while you are just flying past"
- The song "Ashes On Your Eyes" by Deb Talan has the chorus, "You are a phoenix with your feathers still a little wet/baby, the ashes just look pretty on your eyes."
- The song "Emancipate" by Kelis from her album Flesh Tone (2010) includes the lyric "Like the phoenix from the ashes / Or a sunrise off in the distance / I'll try again / I'll try again / I'll try again / we'll try again".
- The longest music video in history, "Runaway" by Kanye West, primarily focuses around a phoenix who has fallen to Earth and after being discriminated against, she bursts into flames to return to her original world.
- Additionally, the West album from which Runaway was taken, "My Beautiful Dark Twisted Fantasy", features cover art that depicts West engaging in sexual intercourse with an armless human female represented as a phoenix.
- Phoenix symbolism is used heavily in the music video for "Marry the Night" by Lady Gaga, particularly in the final scene.
- The song "Rize of the Fenix" by Tenacious D, from the album of the same name, features the lyrics "Just like the Phoenix, we'll f***ing rise again".
- The composition "Fénix" (Phoenix) by Argentine composer Juan María Solare, for violin and cello, is dedicated to a survivor of domestic violence.
- The Norwegian black metal band Satyricon released a melodic song dubbed "Phoenix" on their self-titled album Satyricon (2013).
- The composition Phoenix for mixed choir and organ or piano four-hands by Frederik Magle
- On 11 May 2014, the Eurovision Song Contest 2014 was won by the Austrian artist Conchita Wurst with the song "Rise Like a Phoenix".
- The Brazilian singer-songwriter Jorge Vercillo has a song titled "Fênix" (Portuguese for Phoenix).
- American actress and singer Olivia Holt's debut single, "Phoenix", released on May 13, 2016. In her EP entitled Olivia - EP, the song "Phoenix" is the first track; the song references the rebirth of a Phoenix.
- The phoenix is the symbol of Chanyeol, member of Korean boy band EXO.
- Phoenix (1972) is the album of the same title by Grand Funk Railroad.
- During the disco era, the band Aquarian Dream released their track "Phoenix". The key verse in the chorus is "I have the wings of a Phoenix".
- The rock band Fall Out Boy released a song named "The Phoenix" on 16 July 2013.
- Daft Punk refers to phoenixes in "Get Lucky" (recorded in 2012, published in 2013): "Like the legend of the phoenix ... All ends with beginnings."
- Violinist Lindsey Stirling has a song titled "The Phoenix" on her album titled Brave Enough (2016).
- American musician Illenium frequently uses phoenix imagery, including in his logo and in the names of his albums Ashes (2016), Awake (2017) and Ascend (2019).

== In art ==
- The Phoenix has been depicted numerous times as a motif for collectors’ coins and medals, one recent one being the Belgian 10 euro silver coin 60 years of peace. The obverse depicts the Phoenix as a representation of a new Europe, post 1945.
- Sculptor Theodore Roszak used the phoenix as inspiration for his 1958 "Night Flight". The phoenix can be found in much of ancient Eastern artwork from Sung Dynasty vases.
- The Phoenix is central to the tapestry in the Chamber of the United Nations Security Council, an oil canvas mural painted by the Norwegian artist Per Krohg that represents a symbol of the world being rebuilt after the Second World War. Above the dark sinister colours at the bottom are different images in bright colours, symbolizing the hope for a better future, while equality is symbolized by a group of people weighing out grain for all to share.
- Phoenix (Burning Man installation) built by artists from Ukraine
- Phoenix projects by sculptor Xu Bing

== In film and television ==
- In the daytime soap opera Dark Shadows, the character Laura Murdoch Collins returns to Collinsport, Maine after a ten-year absence to gain custody of her son from her estranged husband, Roger. It is revealed that Laura is an "immortal phoenix" in human form and is nearly at the end of her 100-year lifespan. In order to successfully complete the reincarnation process, she must bring another person—her son—into the fire with her. Laura is reincarnated several times across the plotlines of the series. In the 1897 flashback, Barnabas Collins recognizes her as the first wife of his uncle Jeremiah; she died in 1785. Returning in 1897, she is revealed as a worshipper of the god Ra, which may explain the lack of survivors of those she brings into the fire with her, reframing her victims as a divine sacrifice for favor and power rather than as companions for eternity.
- In the television series Charmed, a line of power-binding witches are called "The Phoenix", sharing the ability to rise from their ashes.
- In season 6 of Supernatural, Sam Winchester and Dean Winchester travel back in time to recover the ashes of a phoenix to kill the season's antagonist Eve. In this instance, the phoenix appears human and is able to burn a person to death merely by touching them, but is killed by Dean using the Colt.
- In the British football-based show Fantasy Football League, there was a regular feature called Phoenix from the Flames, in which comedians David Baddiel and Frank Skinner recreated a famous footballing moment.
- In the anime Battle of the Planets (1978), the American dub of Kagaku ninja tai Gatchaman, the main ship of the G-Force team is God Phoenix, an amphibious craft capable of flying, underwater travel, and minor spaceflight, and serves as a travelling dock for the team members' individual vehicles. In its Fiery Phoenix mode, the ship takes the form of a giant, powerful flaming bird.
- In The Phoenix (1982), Judson Scott played a fugitive ancient astronaut named Bennu (the Egyptian name for the Phoenix) who used the sun's rays to charge a phoenix-emblazoned medallion that provided special powers he used to save those he befriended on his journeys.
- In the Star Trek universe, Phoenix is the name given to the first man-made spacecraft to travel faster than light. It is named Phoenix because, in the Star Trek timeline, the Earth was still recovering from the ravages of World War III, and represents a reborn and bright future for humanity. There is also a Federation starship called the USS Phoenix.
- In the animated series Conan the Adventurer, Needle is Conan's fledgling phoenix sidekick. He possesses the ability to enter flat surfaces and magically transforms into a phoenix design, although he needs all his magical tail feathers to accomplish this, and loses this power if he loses one of them. He spent most of his time on Conan's shield as a phoenix design. When in public, Needle, who has the ability to speak, is often asked to impersonate a parrot in order to not arouse suspicion, an act which he greatly resents.
- In the film The Chronicles of Narnia: The Lion, the Witch and the Wardrobe (2005), based on the book The Lion, the Witch and the Wardrobe by C. S. Lewis, a phoenix bursts into flame and flies over the grass in front of the White Witch's lines, forming a wall of flame to guard Peter's retreat to safer ground.
- In the Pokémon anime, Ho-Oh is a bird-like Pokémon with the power to restore Pokémon's life. It is believed to have created Suicune, Raikou and Entei by rebirthing three nameless Pokémon who died in a fire at a tower now known as the Burned Tower.
- In the Beyblade manga and anime, Dranzer, the bit-beast of the character Kai Hiwatari, is based on the concept of the phoenix.
- In the Yu-Gi-Oh! Trading Card Game, the card Sacred Phoenix of Nephthys has a phoenix-like "rebirth" power, where it is revived from the Graveyard, or discard pile, when it is destroyed by a card effect. Nephthys is an Egyptian goddess, drawing on the Egyptian symbolism and theme of the Yu-Gi-Oh! franchise. Aside from the Sacred Phoenix of Nephthys, there is also Cyber Phoenix, which grants power after its destruction in battle by way of an extra card draw. Many other Phoenix cards also have a similar birth of either power after death, or recursion after being destroyed. The Winged Dragon of Ra, one of the Egyptian God Cards illegal in normal play, was used in the anime/manga to transform into its "Phoenix" mode, with the Harpy Lady cards using a "Phoenix Formation" magic card.
- In a Japanese series Honey Honey no Suteki na Bouken, a famous jewel burglar uses the name Phoenix.
- In the anime series Digimon, a Digimon based on the phoenix is called Hououmon (Phoenixmon in the English dub).
- In the Super Sentai and Power Rangers franchises, there have been many mecha and Zords based on the phoenix. In Gosei Sentai Dairanger (footage used in the second season of Mighty Morphin Power Rangers), the HououRanger controlled Legendary Chi Beast Star Phoenix, which became the Pink Power Ranger's Firebird Thunderzord was based upon the phoenix. However, both of these are based on the Chinese phoenix. In Chōriki Sentai Ohranger (footage used in Power Rangers Zeo), OhRed piloted the SkyPhoenix, which became Zeo Ranger V – Red's Zeozord V. In Seijuu Sentai Gingaman (footage used in Power Rangers Lost Galaxy), the mecha GigaPhoenix was at one time StarBeast GigaPhoenix a blue phoenix before it was mechanized. This became the Stratoforce Megazord which was formally the Phoenix Galactabeast before it became a zord. In Hyakujuu Sentai Gaoranger (footage used in Power Rangers Wild Force) The mecha Gaofalcon is meant to resemble a phoenix, especially when she flies out of a volcano and is covered in flames. In Ninpu Sentai Hurricaneger (footage used in Power Rangers Ninja Storm) The red ranger's hawk zord's main attack engulfs it in flames and flies around an enemy, meant to resemble a falcon. Mahou Sentai Magiranger (footage used in Power Rangers Mystic Force) MagiRed's power comes from the Phoenix and had both a Majin (humanoid) and Majuu (animal) Phoenix form, entitled MagiPhoenix and MagiFirebird (the latter is based on the Chinese phoenix). These forms became the Red Mystic Ranger's Mystic Phoenix and Mystic Firebird Mystic Titan forms. In Juken Sentai Gekiranger (footage used in Power Rangers Jungle Fury), Rinjuu Chameleon Fist User Mele is reborn as a Genshou and gained Genjuu Phoenix Fist after Long infused her with Gengi. After certain events, she voluntarily expelled her Gengi and lost her Genshou form permanently. In Tensou Sentai Goseiger (footage used in Power Rangers Megaforce), Gosei Pink's main mecha is a phoenix like fighter jet. In Uchu Sentai Kyuranger, Houou Soldier's three mechas are Houou Voyager, Houou Station and Houou Base.
- In the X-Men series, the character Jean Grey, who was thought to have perished, eventually resurfaces as the new character Phoenix. In the film series, X2 ends with Jean's apparent death, followed by X-Men: The Last Stand resurrecting her as Phoenix (see also Comics, below). Dark Phoenix (2019) adapts the Uncanny X-Men storyline "The Dark Phoenix Saga", in which Jean is resurrected by the Phoenix Force.
- In Fantasia 2000 (1999), a Phoenix-like fire bird comes alive to the music of The Firebird Suite by Igor Stravinsky. Fiery destruction is followed by glorious renewal.
- In Kamen Rider Ryuki (footage used in Kamen Rider: Dragon Knight), a Rider by the name of Kamen Rider Odin has a phoenix Contract Monster named Goldphoenix. Even his weapon, the GoldVisor, carries the design of a phoenix.
- On the soap opera Days of Our Lives, Stefano DiMera is referred to as the Phoenix. The Phoenix is also the symbol of the DiMera family.
- In the manga and anime series Fushigi Yugi, the main character is drawn towards a historic fairy tale book ruled by four gods; the god that lured her to the book and the god that seems to inundate the side of good in the series is a phoenix named Suzaku, which the main character is destined to summon primarily to save its land from war.
- In the anime series Kaleido Star, the second OVA is named "The Legend of Phoenix". One of the characters, Layla Hamilton, talks about her past, and then about her present life, mentioning that her deceased mother used to read her "The Legend of Phoenix" when she was little. Relying on this, she discovers true strength in being the same as a phoenix, always being reborn from her ashes.
- In the anime series Bleach, the Soul Society uses a weapon called the Sōkyoku for execution, which is a halberd that, when released, takes the shape of a phoenix (Kikōō) used to destroy a soul on contact. In the spin-off game Shattered Blade, the main antagonist uses a weapon called Fénix, which is Spanish for phoenix.
- The British television series Phoenix Nights, part-written by and starring comedian Peter Kay, centers around a Northern club called The Phoenix which is rebuilt after a fire.
- On the television series John Doe, John sees frequent phoenix imagery and a statuette in red, and someone tells him that he is the phoenix.
- In the animated series Storm Hawks, the phoenix is portrayed as a fiery fire-breathing bird.
- In the animated series The Adventures of the Galaxy Rangers, the pilot episode was named "Phoenix", as was the doomed ship of the episode's protagonist, Zachary Foxx. Appropriately, the character's life as an ordinary Ranger and family man was destroyed by an attack from his nemesis. At the end, he is "reborn" as a cyborg leading an experimental team.
- An episode of The Grim Adventures of Billy & Mandy features a phoenix hidden in a box of the fictional cereal Frosted Golden Apple Scraps. The characters try to kill it, but it constantly reappears in a burst of fire.
- In the anime Flame of Recca, Recca Hanabishi's elder brother Kurei possesses the black flame in the original form of a phoenix, which is considered as a sacred flame.
- In the reimagined series Battlestar Galactica, the Phoenix is the symbol for the Twelve Colonies of Kobol.
- In the anime One Piece, Usopp has an attack called "Hissatsu Hi no Tori Boshi" (必殺火の鳥星(ファイアーバードスター), Sure-Kill Fire Bird Star) (必殺火の鳥星(ファイアーバードスター, Sure-Kill Fire Bird Star) that, when fired, takes the form of a bird made up of fire. Also Whitebeard Pirate Commander Marco has the power of the Tori-Tori no Mi, Model: Phoenix (トリトリの実 モデル "不死鳥フェニックス", "Bird-Bird Fruit, Model: Phoenix") Mythical Zoan fruit, which grants him the abilities of a phoenix and allows him to transform into one.
- During the first part of the series finale of Avatar: The Last Airbender, the main antagonist, Fire Lord Ozai, declares that he will both end and win the one hundred-year war by burning most of the Earth Kingdom to the ground using a comet called Sozin's Comet, named after Ozai's grandfather, Fire Lord Sozin, and have a new world rise from the ashes of the old with only the Fire Nation. He then dubs himself the Phoenix King to complement his plan and make himself ruler of the entire world.
- In both the 1965 and 2004 versions of The Flight of the Phoenix, a small cargo aircraft carrying some people and cargo crashes in the Sahara Desert after a violent sandstorm forces them to land. The aircraft is wrecked, but one passenger proposes to rebuild the aircraft with the one remaining engine, and eventually the airplane flies again. The aircraft is "reborn" just like the mythical phoenix creature.
- In the Stargate universe, Phoenix is the name of a Daedalus-class battlecruiser belonging to the Tau'ri before being renamed George Hammond. It also appears in an alternate timeline.
- In the Japanese anime Saint Seiya, the character Phoenix Ikki was born under the Phoenix constellation and inherited the mythical bird's power of rebirth.
- In the anime Bakugan Battle Brawlers, the character Shun Kazami owns the Bakugan "Skyress", which was based on a phoenix.
- In the animated series Gargoyles, a magical shield amulet known as The Phoenix Gate can transport the user through time by thinking of another place and time and chanting in Latin, "Burn down the walls of time and space!" The emblem on the shield is a gold phoenix against a blue sky.
- In the children's movie Big Bird in China (1983), Big Bird and his dog Barkley travel to China to seek Fenghuang, the Phoenix bird of China, also called "the Empress of the Southern Skies". They must seek her out with the help of a young Chinese girl, the monkey king, and four clues on an ancient scroll. When they find her, Big Bird asks her to tell him all about China, but she says that she had planned all along for him to learn about China by seeking her. She then sings the song he had heard of in a story, that she supposedly had sung to demons who stole the sun, for it was her job to carry the sun into the sky every dawn.
- In the animated series My Little Pony: Friendship Is Magic, one of the episodes is based around Princess Celestia's royal pet, a phoenix named Philomena. Another episode reveals that some dragons like to hunt phoenixes and their eggs for sport and also reveals some of the bird's abilities, such as emitting blinding light.
- On the BBC-TV series Merlin Series 3 Episode 8 entitled "Eye of the Phoenix". Morgana gives Prince Arthur a bracelet with a Phoenix Eye placed on it. She told him it was for luck, but her true intention was to have the Phoenix Eye slowly drain Prince Arthur of his strength, making him vulnerable on his quest to the Fisher King's lands. Merlin finds out about Morgana's plan and rushes to save Prince Arthur.
- In Yu Yu Hakusho, the protagonist, Yusuke Urameshi, is more than once associated with the phoenix, from the form his energy takes when he unleashes it while fighting against Younger Toguro during the Dark Tournament, to the form Puu, his spirit counterpart, takes when Yusuke resurrects as a demon on the Chapter Black Saga.
- In the anime Dennou Boukenki Webdiver, there is a robot named Phoenixon, who transforms into a bullet train, and takes a fighter mode form of a phoenix.
- One of Kamen Rider OOO's forms, TaJaDor Combo, is based on the Phoenix.
- A "Phantom" named Phoenix is one of the main villains in Kamen Rider Wizard.
- In the Harry Potter film series, Dumbledore has a pet Phoenix named Fawkes.
- In High School DxD, a royal family of devils called the Phenex Clan have the inherent powers of phoenixes, including pyrokinesis and immortality, which manifests as high-speed regeneration.
- Brian DePalma's cult film Phantom of the Paradise (1974) has a character named Phoenix (Jessica Harper). She is a singer sought by rock impresario Swan (Paul Williams). Because the phoenix evokes rebirth and life, her name is intended as the antithesis of Swan's obsession with death.
- Phoenix, Arizona is the initial setting of Alfred Hitchcock's movie Psycho (1960). It is one of many bird references in the movie, along with Marion Crane, Norman Bates's middle name Francis (the patron saint of birds), and the stuffed birds in the office.
- In Legends of Chima, the Phoenix tribe are the guardians of the sacred Fire CHI, a powerful resource capable of defeating the ice hunters who were taking over the land of Chima.
- In the animated film Satyrday, Lady Fireball is a phoenix who tells Mathew, a satyr to raise Derin, and she later appears to tell Derin about the past and tells him to rule Illu wisely.
- In the anime Monster Rancher, the human protagonists Holly and Genki recruit a team of monsters to aide them in locating the Phoenix, the only monster capable of defeating the evil Lord Moo.
- In Legacies, a spin-off from The Vampire Diaries, at The Salvatore School for the Young and Gifted, a school for the supernatural, student Landon Kirby is revealed to be a Phoenix. Supernatural abilities include being able to return to life in a blaze of fire and ashes several minutes after death and, during heightened emotional states, the ability to fly with protruding angelic wings made out of fire itself. However, he is vulnerable to being shot by the mythical "Golden Arrow".
- In Yashhaime: Princess Half-Demon, a spin-off from Inuyasha, Setsuna has a new technique from Yukari no Tachikiri called "Vermilion Bird Ambush", which is a phoenix from the blade of the naginata.
- In Disney's film Mulan (2020), the Phoenix Fenghuang appear as Hua Mulan's self-guide, leading her on the right path.
- In the animated film Barbie: Mermaid Power (2022), the phoenix appears as Talleigha obtains her fire power.
- In the third season of For All Mankind, one of the Mars transfer vehicles is named Phoenix, named as such due to being built from the damaged Polaris space station.

== As mascot/symbol and others ==
- The seal of Greece under Governor Ioannis Kapodistrias (1828–1832) was the phoenix. It was also used during the military junta (1973–1974) as the national coat of arms of Greece.
- The Provisional Irish Republican Army adopted the phoenix as the symbol of the Irish republican rebirth in 1969, one of its slogans was "out of the ashes rose the Provisionals", representing the IRA's resurrection from the ashes of burnt-out Catholic areas of Belfast.
- Following the Munich Air Crash, Manchester United wore a phoenix on their shirts in the 1958 FA Cup final
- The City of Atlanta, Georgia, United States has the creature on the city seal and Flag, symbolizing the city's rise from being burned by General Sherman's forces during the American Civil War.
- The City of Phoenix, Arizona, United States, uses its namesake creature in the city's flag, and as the city's logo.
- The city of San Francisco, California has a phoenix on its flag, symbolizing the city's rise from the ashes of multiple fires and earthquakes from the mid-19th century through 1906.
- The phoenix figures as a supporter on the coat of arms of Coventry, signifying its rise from the ashes after heavy bombing in World War II. It is also the logo of Coventry University. Similarly, the phoenix is the symbol of Caen University, symbolizing its revival after its complete destruction in 1944. Exeter, England, also has this connection with the phoenix after the Exeter Blitz on 4 May 1942.
- Since April 22, 2015, the Phoenix has been the mascot of Florida Polytechnic University.
- Since 1999, the Phoenix has been the mascot of Elon University in Elon, North Carolina. The choice came from the fact that in 1923, a fire destroyed most of the campus, including school records, classrooms, the library, and the chapel. Soon after the fire, the university trustees began planning to make Elon "rise from the ashes" and the five buildings constructed to replace those lost currently form the academic center of the school. In addition to this, the school's colors are maroon and gold, to match the Phoenix's plumage.
- The Phoenix is the official mascot of Franklin W. Olin College of Engineering. In 2002, the Olin Partners and Virtual Olin Partners selected the phoenix as the school's mascot. This mascot, sometimes unofficially called "Frank", represents Olin's willingness to reinvent itself, just as the phoenix is reborn from its ashes.
- The Phoenix is the mascot of the University of Chicago. An earlier institution by the same name, now known as Old University of Chicago had been founded (on a different site) by Stephen Douglas in 1859, but closed by 1889; the phoenix was chosen as a mascot of the new university to symbolize its rise from the ashes of the old. The phoenix also symbolized the city of Chicago's rebirth following the Great Chicago Fire in 1871.
- The Phoenix is also the mascot of Swarthmore College, which adopted the Phoenix as its first ever mascot in June 2006. The name of their mascot is Phineas the Phoenix.
- The original seal of the College of William & Mary in Williamsburg, Virginia, designed by George Wythe bore an image of a Phoenix. The seal was used by the college from 1783 to 1929. The first connection between the college and the Phoenix occurred in 1705 after the Wren Building, the oldest academic building in continuous use in America, first burned to the ground. James Blair, the founder of the college, promised that William and Mary would be like a phoenix, rising from the charred shell of the old Wren Building. His portrait at the college has a phoenix rising from the base of the Wren in the background. There is also an engraved bronze image of a Phoenix located on Landrum Drive between old campus and new campus. The monument was donated by the class of 1932 in honor of the college's 275th anniversary. The Queen's Guard at the college has a phoenix, modified to suggest the American eagle, on a field of ermine as their insignia.
- The Phoenix is the official mascot of the University of Wisconsin-Green Bay.
- It is also the symbol for three fraternities, and one sorority. The phoenix of Alpha Sigma Phi represents the fraternity's refounding in the early 1900s. For Sigma Alpha Epsilon, it signifies the rebirth of chapters as members leave and new ones are initiated, For Alpha Theta Sigma, it symbolizes eternal existence of the Organization. The Phoenix of Alpha Sigma Alpha recognizes the sorority's reorganization in 1914.
- The mascot of Rice University is an owl; however, each one of its residential colleges have their own unique crests and mascots. The phoenix is both the mascot and the crest of Will Rice College.
- The University of Southern Queensland features a Phoenix on its coat of arms, with the motto Per Studia Mens Nova, Latin for "Through study the mind is renewed".
- University of Phoenix, a system of for-profit education, uses the Phoenix in its logo.
- Following a fire that destroyed the Paddington tram depot in 1962, the Brisbane City Council constructed eight trams from material salvaged from the ruins of the depot. The livery of these trams featured a small picture of a phoenix underneath the motorman's windows, to signify that these trams had "risen from the ashes".
- Grey College of the University of Durham has adopted the Phoenix as its unofficial mascot since its founding in 1959. This was due to the devastation by fire of the then main building of the college, Elvet, just months before the opening.
- The Royal Australian Air Force's 79 squadron, flying Hawk 127 aircraft in the lead in fighter trainer role, has a phoenix on its crest which symbolizes squadron's many reincarnations.
- The 605th Test and Evaluation Squadron of the United States Air Force at Hurlburt Field, Florida, has the phoenix on its unit emblem.
- Cypriot football team of Anorthosis Famagusta FC has Phoenix as its sign along with part of the Greek flag. Both symbolize Greek ethnicity in the island.
- A Phoenix dubbed "Cedrus" was chosen as a logo and mascot of the 6th Francophone games held in Lebanon.
- Wellington Phoenix FC is a professional football club based in Wellington, New Zealand, competing in the A-League Men.
- The name of the pod that was made to rescue 33 men in the 2010 Copiapó mining accident in Chile on October 13, 2010.
- GM's Pontiac Firebird sported a decal of a huge phoenix on the hood of its Trans Am model. Although it came in vogue in the early 1970s, the decal stayed as a cornerstone of the styling until the early 1980s before it was phased out.
- The Pontiac Phoenix was a compact car sold from 1977 to 1984 by the Pontiac division of General Motors.
- Dallas based Tex-Mex chain El Fenix is named for the bird.
- A lighted sculpture of a phoenix was used as part of the closing ceremony of the Games of the XXX Olympiad in London, England.
- Takanashi Kiara, a Virtual YouTuber affiliated with Hololive Productions, is a phoenix in human form who aspires to become the owner of her own fast food chain.
- Atchison High School in Atchison, Kansas has used the Phoenix as its mascot since 2021.

== Comics ==
- In the canon of comic author Osamu Tezuka, the phoenix is often featured as both a literal and symbolic character. Most prominently in the twelve-volume series Hi no Tori, in which the phoenix is an all-knowing cosmic force which connects the string of cultural, physical and spiritual deaths, rebirths, reincarnations and transmigrations through the series.
- In the anime franchise Science Ninja Team Gatchaman, the titular team possesses the ability to temporarily transform their aircraft, The God Phoenix, into a massive phoenix-like bird of flame.
- The character Phenix in Extinctioners is an anthropomorphic phoenix who acts as a team leader. There are a number of phoenixes in the series, each representing a different element; Phenix is one of two who represent fire. In the comics, the symbol of the phoenix itself is an embodiment of hope and life.
- In the Saint Seiya manga and anime, the Phoenix cloth belongs to the most powerful Bronze Saint of Athena, Phoenix Ikki. It can repair itself indefinitely.
- In the comic series X-Men, the Phoenix Force is a cosmic force which grants its hosts powers of telepathy, telekinesis, and resurrection. The Phoenix is most closely associated with the X-Man Jean Grey, her alternate reality daughter Rachel Grey, and her adopted granddaughter Hope Summers.
- In the Gargoyles comic continuation of the original Disney animated series, a phoenix is released from the Phoenix Gate, a magical artifact that enables time travel, following the Gate's destruction. The phoenix brings Brooklyn on a forty-year journey through time, ending only forty seconds from where it began.

== In games ==
- In the MMORPG Rift, the logo for the Defiant faction is a Phoenix. This is also true for the Galactic Republic in Star Wars: The Old Republic.
- In most later entries of the strategy game series Bloons, certain towers can attain an ability which summons a Phoenix. In Bloons Pop!, the Phoenix is instead a Powerup.
- In the MMORPG Guild Wars, players can tame a Phoenix inspired by Chinese mythology in the Factions Campaign
- World of Warcraft also has a flying phoenix mount, Ashes of Al'ar.
- In the MMORPG RuneScape, there is a quest in which the player must assist a mortally wounded Phoenix in her rebirthing ritual, after which the player may return each day and "kill" her, so that her life may be extended further. In return, the Phoenix will give the player five of her feathers, which can be used to summon the Phoenix as a familiar.
- In the real-time strategy game StarCraft II, the Phoenix is a fast air-to-air Protoss unit. When StarCraft II was first announced, it had an "overload" ability capable of inflicting serious damage to many nearby enemy units at once in a way that fit thematically with its name. including rendering itself temporarily inoperative. This ability was removed before the game entered beta test; however, the name stuck.
- In the real-time strategy game Clash Royale, the Phoenix is represented as a playable legendary troop. If killed, it goes into a state of incubation to gain the ability to revive.
- Phoenix is a recurring summon in the Final Fantasy series. It generally deals fire damage to the enemy and resurrects any fallen party members at once, and on occasion will raise its summoner upon KO. The item commonly used for returning a character to life during battle is also called a Phoenix Down.
- In the SNES game Soul Blazer, the protagonist must find three artifacts in order to obtain powerful magic called Phoenix, allowing the player to defeat the final boss, Deathtoll.
- In the Sega Genesis game Shining Force II, a Phoenix joins the team, initially as an assisting A.I.-controlled character and later becoming a full member. He specifically features the great offensive, defensive, and mobility characteristics expected of such a legendary creature, as well as self-regeneration should he fall in a battle. He serves Volcanon, the god of the flying creatures, who appears to have the form of a massive bird, possibly a Phoenix as well.
- The Digimon Hououmon and Zhuqiaomon are based on the phoenix, with the latter being based directly on Suzaku. Birdramon and Saberdramon also take design cues from the phoenix.
- In the English translation of the Nintendo DS series Ace Attorney, Phoenix Wright, known in Japan as Ryūichi Naruhodō, is the protagonist for the first three games. This has a double meaning in that no matter how doomed his cases may appear, he always seems to make a comeback, as if to rise from the ashes.
- In Gaia Online, there is a Monthly Collectible called the Phoenix Circlet, which can be worn as a circlet, collar, and other such poses.
- In the Pokémon franchise, Ho-Oh is a Legendary Pokémon based on a phoenix.
- The Kirby series features the phoenix, particularly in Kirby Super Star and its remake Kirby Super Star Ultra, where the Dyna Blade mode features the titular antagonist, Dyna Blade, who resembles a phoenix. She launches an attack on Dream Land's crops and Kirby confronts her; however, after it is revealed that her motive was to feed her chicks, he instead decides to help her.
- In Heroes of Might and Magic III: Armageddon's Blade, there is a Phoenix creature that is immune to Fire magic and has a chance to resurrect itself when killed.
- In Perfect Dark, the Maian race have their own type of pistol called the Phoenix.
- The Egyptians in Age of Mythology can summon a Phoenix as an in-game unit if they worship Thoth. The in-game description gives it the pseudo binomial nomenclature name Aquila inferna and quotes a passage from "The Travels of Sir John Mandeville" regarding the bird.
- In the game Blue Dragon, a central character, Kluke, has a shadow resembling a phoenix.
- Dance Dance Revolution contains two songs referencing phoenix:
  - DDR Supernova 2 introduces songs that relate to the Solar System. One of those songs is called TRIP MACHINE PhoeniX, a boss song referencing the Sun. This song re-appears in future DDR Games, as well as appearing in Beatmania 15 DJ Troopers and its future installments.
  - DDR A3 has an event called BABY-LON'S GALAXY, beginning in November 1. Completing many songs within that event unlocks the true final boss song on Encore Extra Stage called 鳳, based on the Chinese mythology's Male Phoenix, unofficially known as Hou.
- Sonic Unleashed has Sonic battle the Dark Gaia Phoenix, a bird possessed by the game's main antagonist, Dark Gaia. In the 360 and PS3 versions of the game, the boss has three life bars that must be depleted before victory is achieved, and grows stronger each time it revives.
- In the MOBA League of Legends, Anivia is a "cryophoenix" who is a playable champion and controls the powers of ice instead of the typical fire. The champion Quinn's bird has a skin in which her bird Valor is a phoenix.
- In the MOBA Dota II, there is a hero called Phoenix, who has fire-based abilities, is associated with the sun, and resembles a phoenix.
- In the MOBA Smite, a phoenix tower defends the final guardian, the Chaos/Order Titan.
- In the MOBA Heroes of the Storm, Fenix is a ranged assassin hero from the Starcraft universe whose body was recovered after death and implanted into a dragoon so he could continue to fight.
- In the MMORPG Lineage 2, there is a Phoenix Knight player character class. Phoenix Knights have a special ability to revive themselves after death, and are also granted a firebird summon called "Imperial Phoenix".
- In Ōkami, one of the 12 Celestial Brush Gods is a phoenix named Moegami who gives the player the Inferno brush technique.
- In Bloody Roar: Primal Fury, Cronos Orma's hyper beast form is a humanoid phoenix.
- In the Skylanders series, the playable character Sunburn is a dragon-phoenix hybrid with strong pyrokinetic powers, including fire breath, teleportation, and dashing while lit on fire.
- In the Touhou Project, Fujiwara no Mokou has spell cards that reference the bird. Incidentally, she dies and resurrects after every spell card, and never dies.
- In the game Overwatch, the character Mercy has a resurrection ability with a voice line "Heroes Never Die" as well as a Lunar New Year skin called Zhu Que. It is designed after a Phoenix with the colors being that of fire.
- Phoenix is the TAC name of the player protagonist of the games Air Combat, Ace Combat 2 and its remake Ace Combat: Assault Horizon Legacy.
- In ARK: Survival Evolved, players can tame a Phoenix, whose abilities include fire-themed attacks and a mobile forge/grill. Phoenixes in the game cannot land, referring to the legend that phoenixes can never be earth-bound.
- In the mobile smartphone app Disco Zoo, the Phoenix appears as an unlockable character for the player's zoo.
- In the first-person shooter Valorant is a playable character named Phoenix who uses fire abilities, heals while being in his own fire abilities, and has an ability that revives him should he die.
- In Paper Mario: The Origami King, the Fire Vellumental is a phoenix fought as a boss in the Fire Vellumental Cave, based on the Vermillion Bird of Chinese culture. When Mario defeats the Fire Vellumental, Olivia can transform into it, with King Olly also transforming into the Fire Vellumental in his boss fight.
- One of the bosses in Mega Man X6, Blaze Heatnix, takes his design from the Phoenix, albeit with humanoid arms as well as wings.
- In Terraria's Calamity Mod, Yharon, Dragon of Rebirth, also known as Yharon, Resplendent Phoenix, is the current penultimate boss of the mod, intended to be fought before Draedon's Exo Mechs and Supreme Witch Calamitas.
- StepManiaX released a song in 2022 called "Dark Fenix", composed by the same artist who did Trip Machine PhoeniX (see Dance Dance Revolution above).
- Pump It Up's 2023 arcade installment theme is called Pump It Up Phoenix. All default backgrounds that do not have their own animations (i.e. song shortcuts and remixes) use the phoenix animations during their song.

== Bibliography ==
- Françoise LECOCQ, « Le renouveau du symbolisme du phénix au XXe s. », in Présence de l’Antiquité grecque et romaine au XXe s., éd. Rémy Poignault, coll. Caesarodunum n° XXXIV-XXXV bis, Tours, 2002 (p. 25-59).
- Françoise LECOCQ, « The Dark Phoenix : Rewriting an ancient Myth in Today's popular Culture », in Ancient Myths in the Making of Culture, ed. Malgorzata Budzowska et Jadwiga Czerwinska, Peter Lang, Warsaw Studies in Classical Literature and Culture, 3, Frankfurt am Main - Berlin - Bern - Bruxelles - New York - Oxford - Wien, 2014 (p. 341-354).
- Françoise LECOCQ, « L'invisible phénix dans la trilogie The Hunger Games de Suzanne Collins (romans et films) : animal, personnage et symbole », in Représentations animales dans les mondes imaginaires : vers un effacement des frontières spécistes ?, Actes du colloque de l'Université d'Artois (Arras, 14-15 nov. 2019), revue Fantasy Art and Studies 9 : Amazing Beasts / Animaux fabuleux, dir. Viviane Bergue et Justine Breton, p. 57-72; https://eduscol.education.fr/odysseum/linvisible-phenix-dans-hunger-games-de-suzanne-collins-animal-personnage-et-symbole
- Françoise LECOCQ, « Le mythe du phénix dans la fantasy pour la jeunesse », Cahiers Robinson 49 : Fantasy et Enfance, dir. Marie-Lucie Bougon, Justine Breton et Amelha Timoner, Artois Presses Université, 2021, p. 103-116.
- Françoise LECOCQ, « Le phénix à l’écran : oiseau, machine volante, personnage et symbole », 2020; https://eduscol.education.fr/odysseum/le-phenix-lecran-oiseau-machine-volante-personnage-et-symbole
