= Fireflight (disambiguation) =

Fireflight may refer to

- Fireflight, an American Christian rock band
- Fireflight discography, the discography of the above band
- Fireflight (Transformers), a character in the Transformers franchise

== See also ==
- Firefly (disambiguation)
