= Sunrise over a Sea of Blood =

Sunrise Over a Sea of Blood

Studio album by Mortal Treason
- Released: July 19, 2005
- Genre: Deathcore
- Length: 40:59
- Label: Flicker

Mortal Treason chronology
A Call to the Martyrs (2004)	Sunrise Over a Sea of Blood (2005)	TBA (2016)

Professional ratings
Review scores
Source	Rating
HM	
Jesus Freak Hideout	3.5/5 stars

Sunrise Over a Sea of Blood is the second album from the Christian Deathcore band Mortal Treason. It is the first album to feature bassist TJ Alford, pianist Elizabeth Grimmett, drummer Steve Robinson, and rhythm guitarist Adam Wright.

== Track listing ==
1. "Best Case Scenario" – 1:42
2. "Worst Case Scenario" – 3:21
3. "Dig Your Own Grave" – 3:58
4. "Abaddon" – 3:26
5. "The Falling" – 3:59
6. "Sunrise Over A Sea Of Blood" – 5:08
7. "Taste Of A Bitter Soul" – 3:39
8. "These Evil Days" – 3:17
9. "One Hour From Forever" – 4:13
10. "Death Is The Beginning" – 8:16

== Music style ==
On the Mortal Treason MySpace page they describe who has influenced them for this album.

Our new album "Sunrise over a sea of blood" Has the influences of At the Gates, but it is in its own world. The album we feel is very original.

— Mortal Treason

As indicated by the album's title, Sunrise Over a Sea of Blood covers serious and weighty issues. The title track, according to Kimbrough, "talks about the end times and how the world is going crazy." "Most of the lyrics are about spiritual things that we go through everyday [sic?]," he says. These songs provide an outlet through which Mortal Treason addresses tough topics the band encounters on a daily basis. One melody builds off another, telling a story, reaching a conclusion, and the ending isn't always happy.

== Song meanings ==
The opening record is "Worst Case Scenario", a song about friends falling into drugs and other worldly evils, while "Abaddon" speaks specifically to child abuse, offering a word of hope. Other songs like "The Falling" and "Dig Your Own Grave" explore the repercussions of living life for oneself.

== Personnel ==
Mortal Treason

- Seth Kimbrough – vocals
- Elizabeth Grimmett – keys
- Josh Jarrett – guitar
- Adam Wright – guitar
- TJ Alford – bass
- Steve Robinson – drums

Production

- Nathan Dantzler - Editing, Engineer, Mixing, Mastering, Producer
- Bob Herdman - Executive Producer
- Will McGinniss - Executive Producer
- John Williams & The Tick Tocks - Artwork, Layout Design
