= A Love Hate Masquerade =

Studio album by Kids in the Way
- Released: September 18, 2007
- Recorded: 2007
- Genre: Post-grunge
- Label: Flicker
- Producer: Kato Khandwala

Kids in the Way chronology
Apparitions of Melody (2005)	A Love Hate Masquerade (2007)

Professional ratings
Review scores
Source	Rating
AbsolutePunk.net	83%
Jesus Freak Hideout	3.5/5 stars

A Love Hate Masquerade is the final album from Kids in the Way. A music video was made for the song "Fiction".

== Track listing ==
1. "Your Demon"
2. "Better Times"
3. "The Innocence"
4. "Letting Go"
5. "My Little Nightmare"
6. "Far From Over"
7. "Sugar"
8. "We Kill at Twilight"
9. "Winter Passing"
10. "Fiction"
11. "Farewell"
