= Until June (album) =

Studio album by Until June
- Released: April 17, 2007
- Recorded: 2005–2006
- Genre: Alternative rock
- Length: 30:42
- Label: Flicker
- Producer: Brian Garcia

Until June chronology
The EP (2006)	Until June (2007)	Sound of Defeat (2009)

Professional ratings
Review scores
Source	Rating
AllMusic	4/5 stars
CCM Magazine	3/5 stars
Infuze Magazine	not rated
HM Magazine	not rated
Wise Men Promotions	4.5/5 stars

Until June is the self-titled debut album by alternative rock band Until June. The album was released on April 17, 2007 on Flicker Records.

== Track listing ==
1. "Sleepless" – 2:56
2. "What I've Done" – 3:16
3. "The Saddest Song" – 3:12
4. "Unnoticed" – 3:11
5. "All I Have" – 2:48
6. "Hindsight" – 2:39
7. "Outer Space" – 3:41
8. "Don't Walk Away" – 2:38
9. "This City" – 2:48
10. "You Do" – 3:33
11. "Underneath" - 3:21 Japanese edition bonus track

Also included music video for "Sleepless" Japanese version only

== Album credits ==
Produced by Brian Garcia

== Notes ==
- This album went through several release date changes before finally settling on its current one. The album has been scheduled for June 6, 2006; August 2006; February 20, 2007; March 20, 2007; and finally April 17, 2007. The reason behind all the delays is due to Sony/BMG purchasing their label.
- The song "Sleepless" was featured on Oseven: The Year's Best Christian Rock Hits along with Skillet, Pillar, Jars of Clay, Krystal Meyers, and many other notable Christian rock artists.
- The songs "What I've Done," "The Saddest Song," and "You Do" were featured on Until June's The EP.
- This album was Wise Men Promotions' Album of the Month in February 2007.
