= Cut & Move =

Studio album by Day of Fire
- Released: June 6, 2006
- Genre: Alternative rock, hard rock, post-grunge, Christian rock
- Length: 32:27
- Label: Essential
- Producer: Pete Thornton

Day of Fire chronology
Day of Fire (2004)	Cut & Move (2006)	Losing All (2010)

Professional ratings
Review scores
Source	Rating
Allmusic	4.5/5 stars
Jesus Freak Hideout	4/5 stars

Cut & Move is the second full-length studio album by hard rock band Day of Fire, released on June 6, 2006. The album was produced by Pete Thornton, who has worked with the likes of Limp Bizkit. "Run" was the theme song for WWE Unforgiven 2006. It is the band's only album as a five-piece.

== Track listing ==
Album release
No.	Title	Writer(s)	Length
1.	"Love"	Chris Pangallo, Joe Pangallo, Zach Simms	2:51
2.	"Run"	C. Pangallo, J. Pangallo, Simms	2:27
3.	"Hole in My Hand"	J. Pangallo	3:59
4.	"Cut & Move"	Josh Brown, Gregg Hionis	3:24
5.	"Regret"	C. Pangallo, J. Pangallo, Simms	3:41
6.	"Far and Gone"	C. Pangallo, J. Pangallo, Simms, Adam B Smith	3:27
7.	"Wake Me"	C. Pangallo, J. Pangallo, Simms	2:54
8.	"When the Light"	C. Pangallo, J. Pangallo, Simms, Peter Thornton	3:32
9.	"Frustrating"	C. Pangallo, J. Pangallo, Simms	3:04
10.	"Reborn"	C. Pangallo, J. Pangallo, Simms	3:06
Total length:			32:22

== Credits ==
- Josh Brown - vocals
- Chris Pangallo - bass
- Joe Pangallo - guitar
- Gregg Hionis - guitar
- Zach Simms - drums
