= Mortal Treason =

American metalcore band

- Origin: Huntsville, Alabama, U.S.
- Genres: Deathcore, metalcore
- Years active: 2001–2005, 2014–present
- Labels: Flicker
- Members: Seth Kimbrough; Chase Nickens; Alan Sears; Clay Byrom; Josh Jarrett
- Past members: Richie Reale; Elizabeth Kimbrough; Adam Wright; TJ Alford; Steve Robinson; Bruce Crisman
- Website: Mortal Treason on Facebook

Mortal Treason is an American metalcore band from the Huntsville, Alabama area. Their first album A Call to the Martyrs was released in 2004. Then after major lineup changes, its second album Sunrise over a Sea of Blood was released in 2005. After a quick tour, Mortal Treason decided to disband. On December 8, 2014, most of the original members returned and are currently writing new material. The band is currently on a brief hiatus due to family issues.

Mortal Treason has also contributed two songs "Khampa Nomads" and "War Within" from their debut album A Call to the Martyrs to the compilation CD Flicker Rocks Harder.

== Biography ==
Mortal Treason was founded in Hartselle, Alabama, and released two albums under Flicker Records. Their first album was titled A Call to the Martyrs and had more of a traditional metalcore style. Their second album was titled Sunrise over a Sea of Blood, which contained elements of death metal.

Members of the band said that they believed "God has something else planned for us", but there were also rumors of label problems. On September 11, 2005 Seth Kimbrough officially announced their disestablishment.

Seth Kimbrough announced in a MySpace bulletin that he is currently playing in a new death metal band called Misery Chastain. After leaving Mortal Treason, TJ Alford headed to the metalcore band War of Ages. When Steve Robinson left, he decided to join the band Materia Medica, although the band has of late split-up and their website and MySpace page have been abandoned and possibly vandalised. Adam Wright joined the worship band The Glorious Unseen and released one album entitled Tonight the Stars Speak. Alan Sears left to start a family, also on the side, decided to join the "hardcore" band Bareknuckle. Richie Reale left to move back home in St. Petersburg, FL. He graduated from Full Sail university and is now an engineer at Audio Vision in Miami.

The band was part of The Rise of the Robots Tour alongside notable bands such as The Showdown and Staple.

Seth Kimbrough is an X-Games BMX rider, and has appeared as a playable character on Mat Hoffman's Pro BMX 2.

On Monday, December 8, 2014, Mortal Treason created a Facebook page, announcing its return, with the (somewhat) original lineup. After a few times sitting in with Mortal Treason, the band welcomed Clay Byrom as the bass guitarist. However, the band has been put on a hiatus, due to the members jobs and personal issues. The band will reconvene when possible.

== Band members ==
Current members

- Seth Kimbrough – vocals (2001–2005, 2014–present)
- Chase Nickens – drums (2001–2004, 2014–present)
- Alan Sears – guitar (2014–present), bass guitar (2001–2004)
- Clay Byrom – bass guitar (2014–present)
- Josh Jarrett – guitar (2001–2005, 2014–present)

Former members

- Elizabeth Kimbrough – keyboards (2004–2005)
- Adam Wright – guitar (2004–2005)
- TJ Alford – bass guitar (2004–2005)
- Steve Robinson – drums (2005)
- Richie Reale – guitar (2001–2004)
- Bruce Crisman - bass (2001)

Timeline

== Discography ==
Studio albums

Title	Release date
A Call to the Martyrs	2004
Sunrise over a Sea of Blood	2005

Other releases'

- Flicker Rocks Harder (2004) – contributed "Khampa Nomands" and "War Within"
