= Day of Fire (album) =

Studio album by Day of Fire
- Released: October 26, 2004
- Recorded: 2003–2004
- Genre: Alternative rock, hard rock, post-grunge, Christian rock
- Length: 36:10
- Label: Essential Records
- Producer: Scott Humphrey

Day of Fire chronology
Day of Fire (2004)	Cut & Move (2006)

Singles from Day of Fire
- 1. "Fade Away" Released: 2005

Professional ratings
Review scores
Source	Rating
Allmusic	4/5 stars

Day of Fire is the debut studio album by American rock band Day of Fire. The album's songs, which were written by lead vocalist Joshua Brown and lead guitarist Gregg Hionis, deal with human weakness. "Reap and Sow" was featured on the Digital Praise PC game Guitar Praise.

== Track listing ==
All tracks are written by Joshua Brown and Gregg Hionis, except where noted.

Album release
No.	Title	Writer(s)	Length
1.	"Through the Fire"	Joshua Brown	3:55
2.	"Detainer"		2:49
3.	"Cornerstone"		3:16
4.	"Time"		3:28
5.	"Fade Away"		3:57
6.	"I Am the Door"		2:56
7.	"Rain Song"		3:59
8.	"Adrianne" (Instrumental)	Brown	1:23
9.	"Jacob's Dream"		3:47
10.	"Reap and Sow"		2:30
11.	"To Fly"		3:46
Total length:			38:16

== Awards ==
On 2005, the album won a Dove Award for Rock Album of the Year at the 36th GMA Dove Awards. The song "Cornerstone" was also nominated for Rock Recorded Song of the Year.

== Personnel ==
- Josh Brown - vocals
- Gary Novak - drums
- Chris Chaney - bass
- Phil X - guitar
- Gregg Hionis - guitar
- JJ Farris, Matthew Nelson - additional vocals
- Robin Olsen - strings
- Fontaine Weyman - additional vocals
