= A Call to the Martyrs =

Studio album by Mortal Treason
- Released: February 24, 2004
- Genre: Metalcore
- Length: 40:44
- Label: Flicker
- Producer: Nathan Dantzler, Sam Shifley

Mortal Treason chronology
A Call to the Martyrs (2004)	Sunrise Over a Sea of Blood (2005)

A Call to the Martyrs is the debut album from the Christian deathcore band Mortal Treason.

== Critical reception ==
Professional ratings
Review scores
Source	Rating
Jesus Freak Hideout	4/5 stars
Cross Rhythms	8/10 stars

Andrew Sinft from Jesus Freak Hideout writes: "All in all, A Call to the Martyrs is a solid album and is a must have for any fan of metal or hardcore. Highlights include "Khampa Nomads," "A Walk Thru the Woods," and "Feed on the Weak" (which has an amazing breakdown). The biggest disappointment is the fact that other than a short acoustic track, the album is only eight songs long. Like the band, the album is strong but could have lasted longer." Ben Lilford of Cross Rhythms rate the album eight out of ten, praising the lyricism and musicianship. The only downsides, according to Lilford, are the song titles and Kimbrough's spoken word sections.

== Track listing ==
1. "Khampa Nomads" – 5:33
2. "Walk Thru the Woods" – 5:59
3. "War Within" – 3:45
4. "A Call to the Martyrs" – 3:09
5. "Feed on the Weak" – 4:56
6. "Bride's Last Kiss" – 4:18
7. "Beneath the Shadows" – 3:13
8. "Todd" – 6:14
9. Hidden track – 3:33

== Personnel ==
Mortal Treason

- Seth Kimbrough – vocals
- Josh Jarrett – guitar
- Brett Berry – guitar
- Richie Reale – guitar
- Alan Sears – bass
- Chase Nickens – drums

Production

- Nathan Dantzler - Engineer, Mastering, Mixing, Producer
- Ryan Dominguez - Assistant Engineer
- Bob Herdman - Executive Producer
- Will McGinniss - Executive Producer
- Sam Shifley - Engineer, Producer
- Mark Stuart - Executive Producer
