= Unbroken and Unplugged =

EP by Fireflight
- Released: September 8, 2009
- Recorded: 2009
- Genre: Christian rock
- Length: 18:34
- Label: Independent

Fireflight chronology
Unbreakable (2008)	Unbroken and Unplugged (2009)	For Those Who Wait (2010)

Professional ratings
Review scores
Source	Rating
Jesus Freak Hideout	3.5/5 stars

Unbroken and Unplugged is the second EP from Christian rock band Fireflight. It was released independently on September 8, 2009 to holdover fans until the release of their third major full-length studio album For Those Who Wait which was released on February 9, 2010. It features five newly recorded acoustic arrangements of songs from their first two albums on Flicker Records.

== Track listing ==
No.	Title	Writer(s)	Length
1.	"Stand Up" (Acoustic)	Justin Cox, Glenn Drennen, Wendy Drennen, Kevin Kadish, Dawn Richardson, Phee Shorb	3:32
2.	"Brand New Day" (Acoustic)	Cox, G. Drennen, W. Drennen, Richardson, Allen Salmon, Shorb	3:51
3.	"Forever" (Acoustic)	Cox, G. Drennen, W. Drennen, Rob Hawkins, Richardson, Shorb	4:07
4.	"Unbreakable" (Acoustic)	Cox, G. Drennen, W. Drennen, Hawkins, Richardson, Shorb	4:05
5.	"You Decide" (Acoustic)	Cox, G. Drennen, W. Drennen, Skidd Mills, Richardson, Shorb	3:01
Total length:			18:34
