= Seth Kimbrough =

- Origin: Hartselle, Alabama, United States
- Genres: Metalcore (early), Melodic Death Metal (later), Christian Metal
- Occupation(s): Musician; BMX rider
- Instrument(s): Vocals, Drums
- Years active: 2001 - Present

Seth Kimbrough is a professional BMX rider and musician, appearing as the vocalist for Mortal Treason. Seth is sponsored by Hoffman Bikes and The Shadow Conspiracy. Seth is heavily involved with motorcycles, track riding and mountain biking. He currently resides in Knoxville, Tennessee.

== Biography ==
Seth Kimbrough is a professional BMX rider, sponsored by Hoffman Bikes and The Shadow Conspiracy, and has been in many notable BMX events such as the X-games and the Gravity Games.

Seth has appeared on Mat Hoffman's Pro BMX 2 as a playable character.

== Mortal Treason ==
In 2001 Seth formed the band Mortal Treason alongside Bruce Crisman, Josh Jarrett, Richie Reale and Chase Nikkins. Mortal Treason released their debut album "A Call to the Martyrs" in 2004. Mortal Treason went on several tours including the Rise of The Robots tour alongside The Showdown and Staple.

The band encountered many problems which led to some of the members leaving. After a quick search for members Adam Wright, TJ Alford, Steve Robinson and Seth's then wife, Elizabeth Kimbrough, joined the band. The band soon released their new album "Sunrise Over a Sea of Blood" in 2005, which contained elements of Death metal. The band has of late split up, members of the band said that they believed "God has something else planned for us", but there were also rumors of label problems. As of 2014, Mortal Treason is back together with new tour dates coming soon.

== Misery Chastain ==
Two years after the disestablishment of Mortal Treason Seth announced that he was performing in a new band called Misery Chastain. Misery Chastain has uploaded three songs to their MySpace page entitled "The Unseen", "Behold the Beast" and "Under a Weeping Sky".

Misery Chastain is currently touring around Alabama with bands such as Hidden Among Heroes and Me at the Least.

In March 2009 Misery Chastain released their debut entitled Awaiting the End.

Misery Chastain broke up in 2010.

== BMX ==
Seth Kimbrough attended the X-games in 2000 and 2001; he has finished 4th and 15th respectively.

Competitive History
Date	Event	Position
2001	Gravity Games	14
2001	CFB Series	12
2001	BS Series	31
2002	HSA	9
2002	EXPN (Invitational)	2
2002	EXPN (Invitational)	13
2002	CFB	13
2003	CFB	8

X-Games History
Date	Position
2000	4
2001	15
2008	4

== Discography ==
=== Mortal Treason ===
- A Call to the Martyrs - (2004)
- Sunrise Over a Sea of Blood - (2005)
- TBA - (2016)

=== Misery Chastain ===
- Rurnt EP - (2008)
- Awaiting the End - (2009)
