= Apparitions of Melody =

Studio album by Kids in the Way
- Released: May 10, 2005
- Recorded: 2005
- Genre: Post-grunge, alternative rock, post-hardcore, hard rock
- Length: 43:00
- Label: Flicker

Kids in the Way chronology
Safe from the Losing Fight (2003)	Apparitions of Melody (2005)	A Love Hate Masquerade (2007)

Professional ratings
Review scores
Source	Rating
AllMusic	3.5/5 stars
Jesus Freak Hideout	4/5 stars

Apparitions of Melody is an album released by Kids in the Way. The standard edition was released in 2005 followed by a deluxe edition the following year.

== Track listings ==
Standard edition

1. "Last Day of 1888"
2. "Safety in the Darkness"
3. "Even Snakes Have Hearts"
4. "Breaking the Legs of Sheep"
5. "Apparitions of Melody"
6. "The Seed We've Sown"
7. "Sad and Guilty Ways"
8. "Blind Behind the Wheel"
9. "Burt Rutan"
10. "Head over Heels" (Tears for Fears cover)
11. "This Could Be the Song That Will Change Your Heart"

Dead Letters edition

1. "Fiction"
2. "Apparitions of Melody"
3. "Safety in the Darkness"
4. "Even Snakes Have Hearts"
5. "Getting Over Me"
6. "Last Day of 1888"
7. "Breaking the Legs of Sheep"
8. "The Seed We've Sown"
9. "Sad and Guilty Ways"
10. "Blind Behind the Wheel"
11. "Burt Rutan"
12. "Head Over Heels"
13. "This Could Be the Song That Will Change Your Heart"

Music videos on bonus DVD

1. "Apparitions of Melody"
2. "We Are"
3. "Phoenix With a Heartache"
4. Brief documentary following the recording of the previously unreleased bonus tracks
