= Unbreakable (Fireflight song) =

Single by Fireflight

from the album Unbreakable
- Released: November 6, 2007
- Recorded: 2007
- Genre: Hard rock, post-grunge
- Length: 4:15 (album version)
- Label: Flicker
- Songwriter(s): Dawn Michele, Rob Hawkins
- Producer(s): Rob Hawkins

Fireflight singles chronology
"Attitude" (2007)	"Unbreakable" (2007)	"Brand New Day" (2008)

"Unbreakable" is a song by Christian rock band Fireflight from their second album, Unbreakable. It was released in November 2007 as the album's lead single, receiving television promotion on the NBC network that month. The song soon became popular on Christian rock radio, charting at number one in February 2008. It was 2008's 14th most played song of the year on Christian contemporary hit radio.

The song is about having triumph and victory over past circumstances and has been described as "anthemic". The theme of "Unbreakable" was partially inspired by a fan's question asked on MySpace. It received generally positive reviews from critics and was GMA Dove Award-nominated in 2009 for Rock/Contemporary Song of the Year.

== Background ==
The band's style and theme changed between their debut album, The Healing of Harms (2006), and Unbreakable. The first album was thematically based on "trying to fight your way through circumstances", while Fireflight's second project has a theme of triumph and being "[victorious] over the things that used to control you". According to the band members, the song "Unbreakable" represents that change between the two albums: "now it's about finding power in your life", said bassist Wendy Drennen.

== Music and lyrics ==
The song is carried by an "anthemic" sound and the "riveting vocals" of lead vocalist Dawn Michele. Bassist Wendy Drennen said that "Unbreakable" was about "overcoming a defeated mentality and finding the power to remain strong amid the landscape, not allowing fear to hold us back from having victory over the things that used to control us". It is also lyrically based on the Biblical account of Jesus and the woman taken in adultery; the song's first line states, "Where are the people that accused me?" Richardson said, "The people in charge were ready to kill her, and Jesus speaks up for her, changes their minds and makes them feel ashamed for accusing her ... She knows she’s guilty, and yet she’s suddenly free and given a second chance."

== Release and promotion ==
"Unbreakable" was featured on the promotional soundtrack for NBC's television show Bionic Woman during November 2007. On November 6, the song was officially released as the lead single from Fireflight's second album, Unbreakable. In the beginning of February 2008, it placed at number one on R&R's Christian rock format, becoming the band's third number one single on Christian rock radio. It held the position for at least three weeks, and also charted at number 14 on R&R's Christian contemporary hit radio (CHR) chart; it was the most-added song of the week on the CHR format in mid February. It reached a peak position on the Billboard Hot Christian Songs chart of number 20 in early April.

At the end of 2008 "Unbreakable" was the 14th most-played song of the year on Christian contemporary hit radio. In February 2009, it received a GMA Dove Award nomination for Rock/Contemporary Song of the Year.

=== Reception ===
The song was generally received well by critics. Jesus Freak Hideout editor John DiBiase called it a "powerful anthem" and said that the opening track was "merely the tip of the iceberg" for the album's quality among the other tracks. Bob Felberg of The Phantom Tollbooth was favorable towards the song, saying, "'Unbreakable' ...is one of the strongest Christian rock songs in a long time, both in music and lyrics", and that it featured "a slinky-like guitar and strings interacting before slamming rhythms blow your hair straight back". In response to "Unbreakable" being featured on NBC's Bionic Woman, The Phantom Tollbooth's second reviewer Bert Saraco said, "Mainstream attention is a wonderful thing, of course, but often signals a necessarily generic element to a project that sometimes sends out danger signals as to its artistic or creative potential." Tony Cummings of Cross Rhythms magazine said that the song was "excellent".

== Music video ==
The song's music video premiered on the Gospel Music Channel on March 29, 2008. The video primarily shows the band performing in a building with dark lighting, but also depicts three people in their separate difficulties. The first is a man who was involved in a car wreck. Next shown is a woman who has suffered hair loss from chemotherapy cancer treatment, and the third individual is a teenage girl who struggles with bulimia nervosa. At the end of the song, all three have a more relaxed countenance.

== Charts ==
Weekly chart performance for "Unbreakable"
Chart (2007)	Peak position
US Christian Airplay (Billboard)	20
US Christian CHR (R&R)	14
US Christian Rock (R&R)	1
US Christian Songs (Billboard)	20

== Certifications ==
Region	Certification	Certified units/sales
United States (RIAA)	Gold	500,000^{‡}
^{‡} Sales+streaming figures based on certification alone.

== Awards ==
The song was nominated for a Dove Award for Rock/Contemporary Recorded Song of the Year at the 40th GMA Dove Awards.
