= Revelation Generation =

Christian music festival in Frenchtown, New Jersey

- Genre: Punk rock, alternative rock, pop, Christian rock
- Dates: Labor Day weekend
- Locations: Frenchtown, New Jersey, United States
- Years active: 2005–2010
- Website: revgen.org

Revelation Generation (Rev Gen) was an annual Christian music festival in Frenchtown, New Jersey. The festival was first held on August 13, 2005, and was held annually held on the Saturday and Sunday of Labor Day weekend through 2010. The 2011 event was canceled, and the official website indicates the festival is on an indefinite hiatus.

== Philadelphia stage ==
Friday September 4

- Underoath
- Emery
- Haste the Day
- The Glorious Unseen

Saturday September 5

- Flyleaf
- The Devil Wears Prada
- Norma Jean
- August Burns Red
- Fireflight
- Before Their Eyes
- And Then There Were None

== New York stage ==
September 4

- MercyMe
- Jars of Clay
- Delirious?
- Matthew West

September 5

- Switchfoot
- Relient K
- BarlowGirl
- Needtobreathe
- The Fold
- Seabird

== Nashville stage ==
- Bethany Dillon
- Paul Colman
- Derek Webb
- Jon Foreman
- Corey Crowder

== Come & Live stage ==
- A Plea For Purging
- Kronicles
- Impending Doom
- The Glorious Unseen
- Mychildren Mybride
- Sleeping Giant
- The Ember Days
- I Am Alpha and Omega
- Nothing More
- Oceans In Love

== Urban stage ==
- Lecrae
- Group 1 Crew
- Trip Lee
- Hee-Sun Lee
- RUNAWAY
- DJYNOT?
- Carmen Michelle

== Speakers and guests ==
- Outcast BMX Team
- BFC Skateboard Team
- Justin Lookadoo
- Jack Redmond
- Eric Samuel Timm
- Adam Durso
