= You Decide =

You Decide may refer to:

- "You Decide" (Fireflight song), song by Christian rock band Fireflight from their 2006 album The Healing of Harms
- "You Decide" (Usher song), song by Usher from his joint album with Zaytoven titled A

== See also ==
- Eurovision: You Decide, former UK national selection for the Eurovision Song Contest (2016–19)
- Festive Five: You Decide, a special event in December 2009 on Disney Channel (UK and Ireland), where kids who watch the channel could vote for their No. 1 programme
- Decide (disambiguation)
