= Rogers Masson =

American record producer

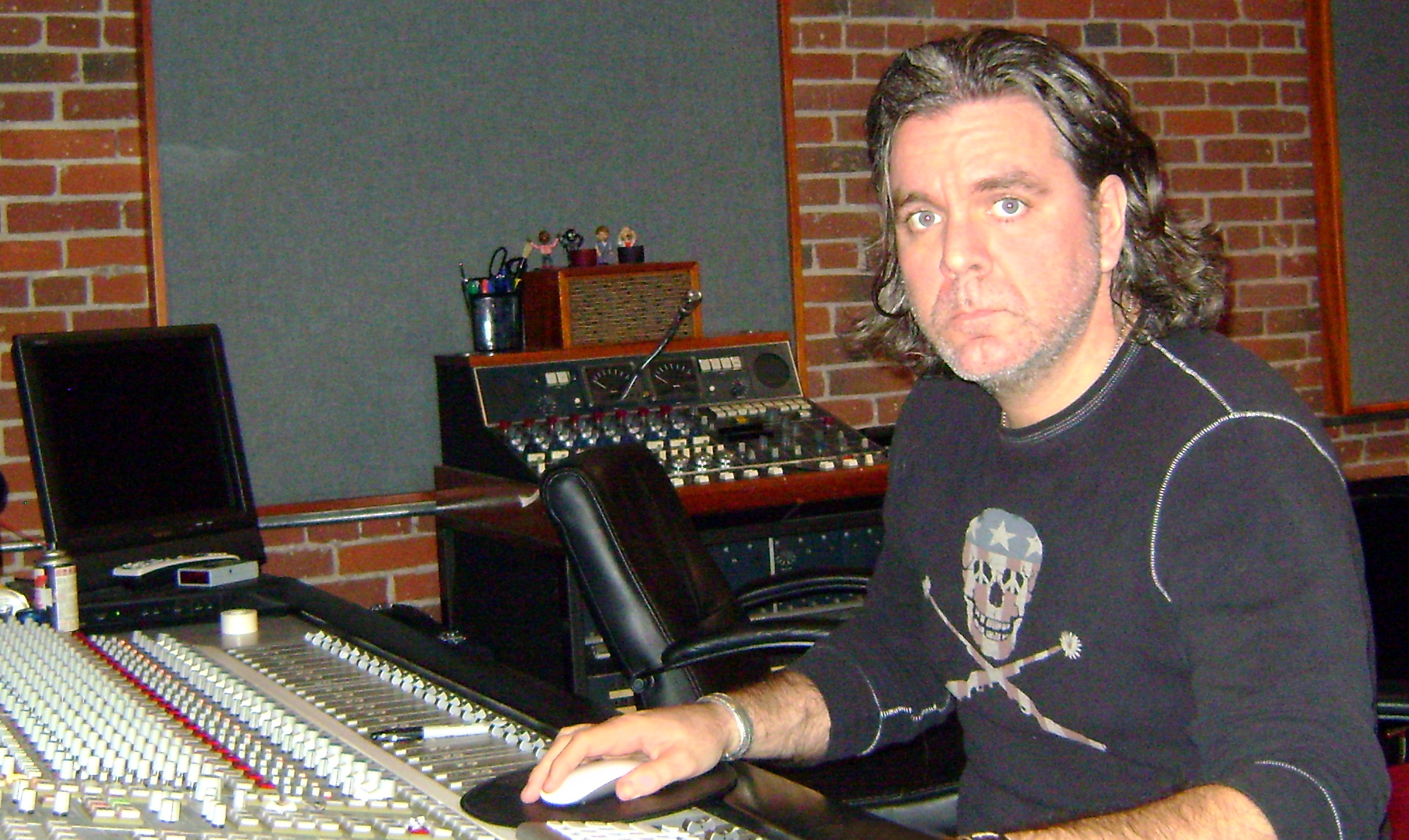

Background information
- Born: Frank Rogers Masson; October 8, 1968 (age 57)
- Origin: Portsmouth, Virginia, USA
- Occupations: producer, mixer, recording engineer, songwriter
- Years active: 1995–present
- Label: Independent
- Website: http://www.psysonics.co, http://www.audreysound.com

Rogers Masson (born October 8, 1968) is an American record producer, engineer, mixer, and songwriter. He has produced and mixed albums for Day of Fire, Vintage Trouble, Lilyphone, and Song of America. Masson has also written songs with Josh Brown of Day of Fire, Chris Daughtry of Daughtry, and Vintage Trouble. His latest project involves helping veterans overcome PTSD with sounds designed to be conducive to alternative therapies, such as MDMA.

Masson mixes most of his records from his studio, The Rog Mahal, in Nashville, TN. He has also produced albums in the United Kingdom and Denmark.

== Biography ==
Rogers Masson was born in Portsmouth, Virginia, and is the youngest of five children. Masson’s father introduced him to music at an early age. Upon graduating high school, Masson joined the US Army and returned to college after his tour of duty. In 1995, he earned a Bachelor of Arts in Music with a concentration in Electro-Acoustics from San Jose State University in San Jose, CA, and has been producing music full-time ever since.

Masson opened the first fully digital studio in Central California called Carmel Digital. There he produced a children’s album with Earthbound Farm called We're Next. Later, he moved to Los Angeles, CA and worked with Snake (Dave Sabo) on Superfixx (Drain STH members) and also with Marilyn Manson on 5.1 mix of the features section of Guns, God and Government called The Death Parade.

In 2005, Masson moved to Nashville, TN. He heard Day of Fire there and produced the Losing All album. He decided to go on the road with the band and co-wrote several songs with the band and with Chris Daughtry, of Daughtry. Their album reached #32, #26 Heatseaker, and their single reached #33 on Billboard's Top Hits.

Masson has also traveled to Denmark to work with Lilyphone. Their album became album of the week on Danish National Radio.

In 2010, he began working with Vintage Trouble, first mixing The Bomb Shelter Sessions, then producing and mixing ten songs for their follow-up album. They were picked up and signed to management by Doc McGhee. His recent credits including mixing the upcoming debut album by Irish alternative pop band Riot Tapes.

Wrote a 4-part blog for ReverbNation, titled "Think You Don't Need A Producer?".

Produced and mixed the album The Gap with the Swiss band Bonnie & The Groove Cats, which reached #5 on the national CH charts and #1 on the weekly Radio Sunshine charts.

In 2023, he co-wrote, produced, and mixed the album Echo Mountain Sessions with Mikey Wayne.

In 2024, Masson founded PsySonics, P.B.C. Masson has been interviewed about his veteran status and subsequent motivation for his new work by Will Stone of NPR regarding the FDA decision about MDMA, by Emma Castleberry for The Assembly, and during a podcast on the show Tracking Yes with Liz Wiltzen.

== Discography ==
- 2024 Poison Ivy - Chaz Cardigan (co-writer)
- 2024 Echo Mountain Sessions - Mikey Wayne (co-writer, producer, mixer, engineer)
- 2023 Blame - Chaz Cardigan (mixer)
- 2023 Grass! - Chaz Cardigan (mixer)
- 2022 Juke Joint Gems - Vintage Trouble (producer, mixer, engineer)
- 2022 The Gap - Bonnie (producer, mixer, engineer)
- 2021 Gracefully - Netflix / CW / In the Dark (producer, mixer, engineer)
- 2021 Bonnie - Bonnie and the Groovecats (producer, mixer, engineer)
- 2016 Buffalo - Shelly Fairchild (mixer)
- 2015 Let It Rock - Live By Satellite (producer, mixer, engineer)
- 2010 Losing All — Day of Fire (producer)
- 2010 The Bomb Shelter Sessions — Vintage Trouble (mixer)
- 2010 Lilyphone — Lilyphone (producer/mixer/engineer)
- 2007 Song of America — Song of America (mixer)
- 2004 The Crickets and Their Buddies — The Crickets (mixer)
- 2003 Theo Wilson Square — The Cribb (producer/mixer/engineer)
- 2002 Guns, God and Government — Marilyn Manson (5.1 mixer/The Death Parade)
