= Safe from the Losing Fight =

Studio album by Kids in the Way
- Released: December 26, 2003
- Recorded: 2003
- Studio: West Main, Franklin, Tennessee
- Genre: Emo, alternative rock
- Length: 50:42
- Label: Flicker
- Producer: Jason Burkum, Nathan Dantzler

Kids in the Way chronology
Safe from the Losing Fight (2003)	Apparitions of Melody (2005)

Professional ratings
Review scores
Source	Rating
Cross Rhythms	5/10 squares
Jesus Freak Hideout	4/5 stars

Safe from the Losing Fight is the 2003 debut album released by Kids in the Way.

== Track listing ==
1. "We Are"
2. "Moving Mountains"
3. "Never Say Die"
4. "Hallelujah"
5. "Phoenix with a Heartache"
6. "Love" (Justin McRoberts cover)
7. "Scars That Save"
8. "This Fire We Started Made Wreckage of All That We Know"
9. "Stars Fall On"
10. "These Are the Days"
11. "Your Knife, My Back"
12. "The End"

== Personnel ==
1. Dave Pelsue – vocals
2. Austin Cobb – guitar
3. Nathan Ehman – guitar
4. Nathan Hughes – bass guitar, backing vocals
5. Eric Carter – drums
