= Until June =

US musical group

- Also known as: Juune (original name)
- Origin: Hollywood, California, United States
- Genres: Alternative rock
- Years active: 2001–2014, 2016-present
- Labels: Tooth and Nail, Flicker, Sony BMG, Authentik Artists, Madison Line
- Members: Josh Ballard; Dan Ballard; Daniel Dempsey
- Past members: Justin Turley; Chris Foley; Jamie Pitts

Until June (originally Juune) is an American alternative-rock band, from the Hollywood district of Los Angeles, California. Formed in 2001, the band is currently signed to Tooth and Nail Records.

They are known for their song "What I've Done", which made the top-ten songs on contemporary hit radio chart and was used for ABC's "Private Practice" television series and ABC's Grey's Anatomy season 3 DVD. Their song "In My Head" was featured in Grey's Anatomy season 6 episode 3.

The band is also known for their song "Sleepless" which reached number one in Greece in June and July 2008 and number four in Norway in June 2008.

The band released their second album Young and Foolish on August 21, 2012, on Madison Line Records.

== Background ==
Josh Ballard, Dan Ballard, Chris Foley, and Justin Turley self-produced and released several EPs and played many shows in the Hollywood area, under the name Juune. To get the attention of major labels, they hopped "the fence at Capitol Records and put flyers on cars" said Josh Ballard. They set a deadline of being signed by June 2005 or they would break up.

In the spring of 2004, drummer Turley left the band to move closer to his family in Texas, and he was replaced by Jamie Pitts. The band continued to self-produce and release EPs and label interest began growing in late 2004.

In the spring of 2005, as the band was in the early stages of negotiating with several labels, Foley left the band to get married, and Pitts left to continue pursuing his academic goals. Daniel Dempsey joined the band shortly thereafter.

In August 2005, the band signed with Flicker Records of the Sony BMG's Provident Label Group. Due to legal concerns, the name Juune was changed to Until June after their original deadline.

Their self-titled debut extended play, Until June – The EP, featuring Josh Ballard on keyboards and vocals, Dan Ballard on guitar, Dempsey on drums, and Foley on bass, was released in March 2006.

Their debut studio album, Until June, was produced by Brian Garcia and was released on April 17, 2007.

The band's first international success was in Greece when the single, "Sleepless", topped the radio charts on May 8, 2008.

In late 2008, the band left Flicker to sign with Authentik Artists.

The band was planning on releasing their second album in 2010, which might be entitled www. Mixing of the album was reportedly completed March 27, 2010. However, the band posted a status update on May 11, 2010, noting "Re-doing a few guitar tracks for www It's sounding quite lovely." Mariah McManus sings backing vocals on one of the songs. On May 19, 2010, the band gave an album update, stating "It's official now. Finally after two years the second full length UJ record is done.". As of June 15, 2010, the album was "coming soon".

The band's album, Young and Foolish, was released August 21, 2012. The trio produced the album themselves, but brought in Grammy Award-winning mixer Kevin Killen, to help achieve the "atmospheric blend".

== Discography ==
=== Studio albums ===
- Until June (2007)
- Young and Foolish (2012)

=== Extended plays ===
- Until June – The EP
- Sound of Defeat (2009)

As Juune:

- Juune EP - May 2002
- The Blue EP - March 2003
- The Red EP - January 2003
- Unnoticed EP - August 2003
- Why Not Stop EP - June 2004
- My Luck's Run Out EP - (never released) January 2005

=== Featured television series spots ===
- "What I've Done" featured on ABC's Private Practice commercials fall 2007
- "What I've Done" featured on ABC's Grey's Anatomy DVD season 3 box set
- "In My Head" featured on ABC's Grey's Anatomy Season 6 episode 603 (October 1, 2009)
- "You Do" featured on CW Gossip Girl

=== Singles ===
- "What I've Done" number 4 (December 21, 2007, R&R)
- "Sleepless'" number one, Greece (May 8 and May 15, 2008, R&R)
- "Sleepless" number 4, Norway (July 2008)
- "What Went Wrong" (August 2012)

== Members ==
- Josh Ballard - vocals, piano, keyboards
- Dan Ballard - guitar, backing vocals
- Daniel Dempsey - drums (2005-)

=== Former members ===
- Chris Foley - bass (2001-2005)
- Justin Turley - drums, backing vocals (2001-2004)
- Jamie Pitts - drums (2004-2005)

== See also ==
- List of alternative-rock bands
- List of bands from Los Angeles
- Music of Los Angeles
