= For Those Who Wait =

Studio album by Fireflight
- Released: February 9, 2010
- Recorded: 2009
- Genre: Christian rock, hard rock
- Length: 35:12
- Label: Flicker
- Producer: Rob Hawkins; Jason McArthur (executive)

Fireflight chronology
Unbroken and Unplugged (2009)	For Those Who Wait (2010)	Now (2012)

Singles from For Those Who Wait
- 1. "Desperate" Released: November 2009; 2. "For Those Who Wait" Released: May 2010; 3. "All I Need To Be" Released: June 2010; 4. "What I've Overcome" Released: November 23, 2010

Professional ratings
Review scores
Source	Rating
Allmusic	4/5 stars
Jesus Freak Hideout	4/5 stars

For Those Who Wait is the fourth full-length studio album released by Christian rock band Fireflight. The album was released on February 9, 2010 on Flicker Records.

== Release and promotion ==
On February 2, 2010 until the release of the album, Fireflight posted their lead track, "For Those Who Wait", for free to download on Amiestreet.

For Those Who Wait was released on February 9, 2010. It peaked at No. 5 on the Billboard Top Christian Albums chart, No. 16 Alternative Albums and No. 96 on the Billboard 200. It was their highest CD on the chart, selling over 15,000 copies in its first week.

The Japanese bonus track, "Proof of Our Love", was given out to fans via e-mail on February 9, 2010. The website for the promotion, titled "For Those Who Waited", ended and the site address is now defunct.

The album received largely favorable reviews. The band toured in late 2010 on the For Those Who Wait Tour with Group 1 Crew and Manic Drive in support of the album.

On December 1, 2010, it was announced that For Those Who Wait had been nominated for a Grammy in the Best Rock or Rap Gospel Album category, marking Fireflight's first Grammy nomination. It lost to Switchfoot's Hello Hurricane.

== Track listing ==
All tracks are written by Fireflight and where noted.

No.	Title	Writer(s)	Length
1.	"For Those Who Wait"	Rob Hawkins	4:07
2.	"Desperate"	Rob Hawkins	2:54
3.	"Fire in My Eyes"	Ben Glover	2:59
4.	"Core of My Addiction"	Jason McArthur	3:14
5.	"What I've Overcome"	Ben Glover	3:05
6.	"Name"	Ben Glover	3:49
7.	"New Perspective"	Jason McArthur; Rob Hawkins	3:20
8.	"You Give Me That Feeling"	Rob Hawkins	3:23
9.	"All I Need to Be"	Rob Hawkins	3:35
10.	"Recovery Begins"	Rob Hawkins	4:54
Total length:			35:12

Japanese bonus track
No.	Title	Writer(s)	Length
11.	"Proof of Our Love"	Fireflight	3:33

Alternate Japanese Edition bonus tracks
No.	Title	Writer(s)	Length
11.	"Stand Up (Acoustic)"	Fireflight	3:31
12.	"Unbreakable (Acoustic)"	Fireflight	4:04
Total length:			42:49

Personnel

- Dawn Michele - lead vocals
- Justin Cox - guitar
- Glenn Drennen - guitar
- Wendy Drennen - bass
- Rob Hawkins - producer, engineer, digital editing
- Ben Grosse - mixing (track 1), Mix Consultant
- Paul Pavao - mixing (tracks 2–10)
