= Unbreakable (Fireflight album) =

Studio album by Fireflight
- Released: March 4, 2008
- Recorded: 2007
- Genre: Hard rock; Christian rock; post-grunge
- Length: 34:49
- Label: Flicker
- Producer: Rob Hawkins

Fireflight chronology
The Healing of Harms (2006)	Unbreakable (2008)	Unbroken and Unplugged (2009)

Singles from Unbreakable
- 1. "Unbreakable" Released: 2007; 2. "Brand New Day" Released: 2008; 3. "The Hunger" Released: 2008; 4. "You Gave Me a Promise" Released: 2008; 5. "Stand Up" Released: 2009

Professional ratings
Review scores
Source	Rating
AllMusic	3.5/5 stars
Jesus Freak Hideout	5/5 stars

Unbreakable is the third full-length studio album released by Christian rock band Fireflight, but second full-length to be released on Flicker Records. The album was released on March 4, 2008, on Flicker Records.

== Background ==
Unbreakable was recorded in September and October 2007. Lead vocalist Dawn Michele said that the recording process was "one of the most hectic times in our lives because we had about six years to write the first album and about six months to write the second one".

The album was produced by Rob Hawkins.

== Release and promotion ==
The album's title track "Unbreakable" was officially released to radio in December 2007. The song was featured on an episode of NBC's Bionic Woman. A music video for "Unbreakable" made its premiere on March 29, 2008.

The album's second radio single, "The Hunger", was released in mid-2008. As of June 2010, the album sold about 100,000 copies.

== Style and lyrical themes ==
The band's female-fronted hard rock sound has been compared to Paramore and Evanescence, and Dawn Michele's vocals on Unbreakable have been described as "riveting". AllMusic reviewer Jared Johnson labeled certain tracks as "pulsating rockers", such as the singles "Unbreakable" and "The Hunger"; he described the album's lyrics to be "victorious as a refuge for listeners struggling with loneliness, discouragement, and isolation." Guitarist Justin Cox said, "we push it as heavy as we can without being metal".

The title track "Unbreakable" is based on the Biblical account of Jesus and the woman taken in adultery. Dawn Michele (lead vocalist) said: "the people in charge were ready to kill her, and Jesus speaks up for her, changes their minds and makes them feel ashamed for accusing her. [...] She knows she's guilty, and yet she's suddenly free and given a second chance."

== Commercial performance ==
The album debuted at No. 10 on Billboard's Top Heatseekers and No. 5 on the Top Christian Albums chart. The debut single "Unbreakable" was released in late 2007, and by February 2008 it reached No. 1 on Christian rock radio charts after only seven weeks of radio airplay. The song also peaked at No. 4 on Radio & Records CHR Chart April 2008. It was the 14th most-played song on R&R magazine's Christian CHR chart for 2008.

"The Hunger", the album's second single, charted at No. 1 in July 2008.

== Accolades ==
The album was nominated for a Dove Award for Rock/Contemporary Album of the Year at the 40th GMA Dove Awards. The title song was also nominated for Rock/Contemporary Recorded Song of the Year.

== Track listing ==
All tracks are written by Justin Cox, Glenn Drennen, Wendy Drennen, Dawn Richardson, Phee Shorb; additional writers noted.

No.	Title	Writer(s)	Length
1.	"Unbreakable"	Rob Hawkins	3:21
2.	"You Gave Me a Promise"	Hawkins	3:32
3.	"Brand New Day"	Allen Salmon	4:11
4.	"The Hunger"	Ben Glover	3:09
5.	"Stand Up"	Kevin Kadish	3:16
6.	"Forever"	Hawkins	3:43
7.	"Go Ahead"	Glover	3:02
8.	"The Love We Had Before"	Glover	3:43
9.	"So Help Me God"	Glover	3:17
10.	"Wrapped in Your Arms"	Hawkins	3:40
Total length:			34:49

== Personnel ==
Fireflight

- Dawn Michele – vocals
- Justin Cox – guitars, vocals
- Glenn Drennen – guitars
- Wendy Drennen – bass
- Phee Shorb – drums

Additional personnel

- Chris Carmichael — violin, viola, cello and string arrangements (tracks 3, 10)
- Rob Hawkins — keyboards, programming
