= Now (Fireflight album) =

Studio album by Fireflight
- Released: March 6, 2012
- Recorded: 2011
- Genre: Christian rock, hard rock, post-grunge
- Label: Essential
- Producer: Jasen Rauch

Fireflight chronology
For Those Who Wait (2010)	Now (2012)	Innova (2015)

Singles from Now
- 1. "Stay Close" Released: November 18, 2011; 2. "He Weeps" Released: July 24, 2012; 3. "Stronger Than You Think" Released: October 30, 2012

Now is the fifth full-length studio album released by Christian rock band Fireflight released on March 6, 2012 on Flicker Records. It is their fastest selling and highest charting album to date. As of July 15, 2012 the album has sold more than 40,000 copies.

A special Colorado Mix of "He Weeps" was released on July 24, 2012 for airplay on Air 1.

== Track listing ==
All tracks are written by Fireflight and where noted.

No.	Title	Writer(s)	Length
1.	"Stay Close"	Rob Graves; Jasen Rauch	3:28
2.	"Ignite"	Josh Baker; Mark Holman; Joe Rickard	2:56
3.	"Escape"	Holman; Rauch; Dave Stovall	4:21
4.	"He Weeps"	Ben Glover	3:36
5.	"Keeping Me Alive"	Rauch	3:55
6.	"Stronger Than You Think"	Glover; Rauch	3:41
7.	"Prove Me Wrong"	Rob Hawkins	3:33
8.	"Dying For Your Love"	Graves; Rauch	3:21
9.	"Rise Above"	Holman; Rauch	4:29
10.	"Now"	Glover	2:49
Total length:			36:09

iTunes pre-order bonus track
No.	Title	Length
11.	"Stay Close (Music Video)"	3:33
12.	"Stay Close (Crash and Burn Remix)"	3:46
Total length:		43:28

=== Personnel ===
- Dawn Michele - Vocals
- Justin Cox - Guitar
- Glenn Drennen - Guitar
- Wendy Drennen - Bass
- Jasen Rauch - producer
- Ben Grosse - Mixing (track 1)
- Paul Pavao - Mixing (tracks 2–10)
- Vlado Meller - Mastering
