= Full Devil Jacket =

American metal band

- Origin: Jackson, Tennessee, U.S.
- Genres: Alternative metal, nu metal, post-grunge
- Years active: 1997–2000, 2010–present
- Labels: Island/Def Jam, eOne
- Members: Josh Brown; Brian Kirk; Paul Varnick; Moose Douglass; Keith Foster
- Website: Full Devil Jacket on Facebook

Full Devil Jacket is an American alternative metal/post-grunge band from Jackson, Tennessee, formed in 1997.

== History ==
=== Formation and success ===
Musicians Josh Brown, Mike Reaves, Kevin Bebout, and Keith Foster all met at Josh Brown's brother's tattoo shop in Jackson, Tennessee and formed the band Voodoo Hippies. Jonathan Montoya was the last addition to the band as the second guitarist. While still playing gigs in Jackson, the band caught the eye of rock producer Malcolm Springer (Matchbox 20, Collective Soul).

Before being signed to Island/Def Jam Records, the band changed its name to Full Devil Jacket. There are two stories on how the band chose this name. One is that the band was named after a song written by lead singer Josh Brown, called "Full Devil Jacket". Another story is that the band simply pulled the name from a magazine article.

While signed to Def Jam Records, the band had a successful career. They first released an EP titled A Waxbox to Put Your Frankenstein Head In... in October 1999, followed by an eponymous LP in March 2000.

The band toured with Creed, Nickelback, Type O Negative, played at Woodstock 99, and was featured on the Tattoo the Earth tour with Mudvayne, Slipknot, Sepultura, Slayer, Drain STH, and Coal Chamber with Metallica headlining one show. However, while on tour with Creed, Josh Brown suffered a drug overdose and subsequently quit the band. An unfinished album from this time remains unreleased. Some of the songs the band was working on were "Shelter", "All Apologies", "Superdysfunctional Hero", and "Bottle".

After the departure of Brown, Michael Reaves also left the band. Full Devil Jacket recruited a new lead singer (Ben Hatch; then Jamie Martin) and a new second guitarist (Dave White) and recorded an unreleased EP under their new name of WaxBox before dissolving altogether. This incarnation of the band worked on some of the same songs that they started with Brown. The EP included "Shelter", "All Apologies", "Superdysfunctional Hero", and "Sober".

=== Reunion ===
Full Devil Jacket announced a one-time reunion concert on June 19, 2010, in Jackson, Tennessee, to benefit the James Michael Reaves Medical Expense Fund. This led to more live performances as well as recording new material. On July 27, 2011, James Michael Reaves died after battling cancer. Every Mother's Nightmare guitarist Jeff Caughron joined the band after Reaves' death.

Brown and Montoya also formed a new band with Jason Null from Saving Abel named A New Rebel. FDJ members Keith Foster and Kevin Bebout were also involved.

In 2013, the band started a Kickstarter page to help fund and promote a new album. On January 14, 2015, it was announced that FDJ signed a worldwide deal with eOne Music. Their album Valley of Bones was released on March 31. It contains 10 new songs and feature cover art of a painting by singer Josh Brown.

During the spring of 2015, FDJ opened for Hinder during their "When the Smoke Clears" tour.

In September 2015, the band toured with American rock band Bridge to Grace from Atlanta, Georgia.

The band's current lineup consists of Josh Brown (vocals), Brian Kirk (guitar), Paul Varnick (guitar), Moose Douglass (bass) and Keith Foster (drums).

== Musical style ==
AllMusic described the band as a "hard-hitting post-grunge/alt-metal outfit [that] invokes names like Staind, Godsmack, and Alice in Chains".

== Members ==
Josh Brown

In 2000, Brown nearly died of a heroin overdose. While recovering in rehab and working on their second album, he converted to Christianity and left the band, retreating to Jackson, Tennessee.

After several years, Josh Brown re-entered the music scene with his new project Day of Fire which was signed to Essential Records until 2007. Their self-titled debut won a Dove Award for Rock Album of the Year and was nominated for a Grammy Award for Best Rock Gospel Album. Day of Fire released their second album titled Cut & Move on Sony's RED Distribution/Essential Records in 2006. Following two years of going unsigned, DoF signed with Razor and Tie Records, and released their third album titled Losing All in January 2010. In June 2010, the band announced they would be taking an indefinite hiatus.

Jonathan Montoya

After working with some local Jackson, Tennessee projects such as One Less Reason, Montoya formed his current project Supernova Syndicate. As history would repeat itself, the band recorded a debut CD that was never released. They are currently back in the studio and working on their debut album again.

Montoya also filled in as a guitar player for the band Saliva on their European tour. He was eventually invited to be a full-time member of the band. On August 30, 2010 he was released from Saliva. As of 2015, he is back with Saliva full-time.

Michael Reaves

After Full Devil Jacket, Reaves toured Europe with a band called Travisty and briefly worked with the pop singer Jasmine Cain. He also wrote and recorded with Randy Lovelace around Jackson, Tennessee. Reaves lived in Dyersburg, Tennessee and was with a band named 3 Legged Dog. He died from prostate cancer on July 25, 2011 at the age of 52.

Keith Foster

After Full Devil Jacket and WaxBox, Keith Foster played drums for Danny Archer in the band Love Over Gravity around Jackson, TN and Nashville, TN. Along with guitarist Greg Scallions (brother of Fuel frontman Brett Scallions) and bass player Brad Singleton, they recorded eight songs with record producer Michael Wagener (Ozzy, Metallica, Skid Row, etc.). The songs were never officially released, but can be found online.

Kevin Bebout

Bebout is currently working for Epiphone as Kramer Project Manager. He is thanked by Jonathan Montoya in Saliva's latest CD liner notes for endorsing the band with custom Kramer guitars. He also plays bass in the Nashville-based Humorcore band called Holy Crap!. In 2016, Kevin joined pop artist and former co-writing partner of Mike Reaves, Jasmine Cain as part of her touring band.

== Discography ==
=== Studio albums ===
- Full Devil Jacket (2000)
- Valley of Bones (2015)

=== Extended plays ===
- A Wax Box (1999)

=== Singles ===
Year	Single	Chart	Position
2000	"Where Did You Go?"	Mainstream Rock Tracks	19
2000	"Now You Know"	Mainstream Rock Tracks	23
