= Losing All =

Studio album by Day of Fire
- Released: January 26, 2010
- Recorded: 2009
- Genre: Post-grunge
- Label: Razor & Tie
- Producer: Rogers Masson

Day of Fire chronology
Cut & Move (2006)	Losing All (2010)

Professional ratings
Review scores
Source	Rating
Allmusic	4/5 stars
Jesus Freak Hideout	3/5 stars
Christian Music Zine	(C)

Losing All is the third studio album from rock band Day of Fire, released on January 26, 2010.

== Track listing ==
Album release
No.	Title	Writer(s)	Length
1.	"Light 'Em Up"	Chris Pangallo, Joe Pangallo, Zach Simms	4:01
2.	"Hello Heartache"	Brian Craddock, Chris Daughtry, Rogers Masson, C. Pangallo, J. Pangallo, Simms	3:48
3.	"When I See You"	Craddock, Daughtry, C. Pangallo, J. Pangallo, Simms	3:08
4.	"Airplane"	Daughtry, C. Pangallo, J. Pangallo, Simms	3:44
5.	"Lately"	C. Pangallo, J. Pangallo, Simms	3:49
6.	"Cold Addiction"	C. Pangallo, J. Pangallo, Simms	4:15
7.	"Landslide"	C. Pangallo, J. Pangallo, Simms	4:36
8.	"Never Goodbye"	Gregg Hionis, C. Pangallo, J. Pangallo, Simms	5:14
9.	"Hey You"	C. Pangallo, J. Pangallo, Simms	3:57
10.	"We Are No One"	C. Pangallo, J. Pangallo, Simms	4:04
11.	"Long Highway"	C. Pangallo, J. Pangallo, Simms, Adam B Smith	5:10
12.	"Strange"	C. Pangallo, J. Pangallo, Simms	0:56
13.	"The Dark Hills"	Billy Falcon, Rose Falcon, C. Pangallo, J. Pangallo, Simms	5:11
Total length:			51:53

Pre-order exclusive tracks
No.	Title	Length
1.	"Aftermath"
2.	"Overboard"
3.	"Light 'Em Up" (Live)
4.	"Hello Heartache" (Live)
5.	"When I See You" (Live)

== Personnel ==
- Joshua Brown - vocals
- Joe Pangallo - guitar
- Chris Pangallo - bass
- Zach Simms - drums
