= The Healing of Harms =

Studio album by Fireflight
- Released: July 25, 2006
- Genre: Christian rock, alternative metal, post-grunge
- Length: 35:42
- Label: Flicker
- Producer: Skidd Mills

Fireflight chronology
On the Subject of Moving Forward (2004)	The Healing of Harms (2006)	Unbreakable (2008)

Professional ratings
Review scores
Source	Rating
AllMusic	3.5/5 stars
Jesus Freak Hideout	4.5/5 stars

The Healing of Harms is the second full-length studio album released by Christian rock band Fireflight in 2006. The album was Fireflight's first release on Flicker Records. "Waiting", "Liar", and "Serenity" previously appeared on the band's first EP On the Subject of Moving Forward (though "Serenity" was titled "Call").

== Track listing ==
All tracks are written by Justin Cox, Glenn Drennen, Wendy Drennen, Skidd Mills, Dawn Richardson, Phee Shorb except where noted.

No.	Title	Writer(s)	Length
1.	"Serenity"		3:31
2.	"Waiting"		2:55
3.	"You Decide" (featuring Josh Brown of Day of Fire)		3:11
4.	"It's You"	Cox, G. Drennen, W. Drennen, Ian Eskelin, Skidd Mills, Richardson, Shorb	3:13
5.	"Star of the Show"		3:02
6.	"Liar" (featuring David Paul Pelsue of Kids in the Way)	Cox, G. Drennen, W. Drennen, Skidd Mills, David Pelsue, Richardson, Shorb	3:36
7.	"Myself"		3:01
8.	"Something New"	Cox, G. Drennen, W. Drennen, Rob Hawkins, Richardson, Shorb	3:29
9.	"Attitude"	Cox, G. Drennen, W. Drennen, Richardson, Shorb	3:30
10.	"More Than a Love Song"	Cox, G. Drennen, W. Drennen, Richardson, Shorb	3:07
11.	"Action"	Cox, G. Drennen, W. Drennen, Richardson, Shorb	3:08
Total length:			35:43

== Personnel ==
- Dawn Richardson – lead vocals
- Justin Cox – guitar, backing vocals
- Wendy Drennen – bass, backing vocals
- Phee Shorb – drums
- Glenn Drennen – guitar
- Skidd Mills - Producer, Engineer, Mixing
- Brad Blackwood - Mastering
