= Misery Chastain (band) =

American Christian deathcore band

- Origin: Cullman, Alabama
- Genres: Christian metal, speed metal, hardcore punk, progressive death metal, black metal
- Years active: 2006–2010
- Past members: Seth Kimbrough; Clay Byrom; Seth Powell; Jesse Mardis; Wes Harrison
- Website: Misery Chastain on Myspace

Misery Chastain was a Christian deathcore band, that was formed by Seth Kimbrough, after his former band, Mortal Treason, disbanded. They have toured with bands such as A Plea For Purging, Whitechapel, War of Ages, Mychildren Mybride, and Becoming the Archetype.

== History ==
Two years after the disestablishment of Mortal Treason, Seth Kimbrough announced that he was performing in a new band called, Misery Chastain. Misery Chastain uploaded three songs to their MySpace page entitled "The Unseen", "Behold the Beast" and "Under a Weeping Sky". Two of the songs, were a part of an EP titled Rurnt, which was released for free via PureVolume.

Misery Chastain toured with bands such as Hidden Among Heroes and Me at the Least.

In March 2009, Misery Chastain released their debut entitled Awaiting the End.

In 2010, Misery Chastain broke up. Drummer, Seth Powell, joined the band Floodgates soon after. In 2014, Kimbrough announced that Mortal Treason had reunited, with Bassist Clay Byrom joining the band.

== Members ==
Last Known Line-Up

- Seth Kimbrough - vocals (2006-2010)
- Clay Byrom - bass (2006-2010)
- Wes Harrison - guitar (2006-2010)
- Jesse Mardis - guitar (2006-2010)
- Seth Powell - drums (2006-2010)

Former Members

- Luke Smith - guitar
