= The Glorious Unseen =

American Christian rock band

- Origin: Nashville, Tennessee, U.S.
- Genres: Christian rock, contemporary worship
- Years active: 2007–present
- Labels: BEC
- Members: Ben Crist
- Past members: Ryan Stubbs; Ben Harms; Chris Vicari; Adam Smith; Patrick Copeland; David Lim; Adam Wright; Jonathan Todryk; Matt James
- Website: www.thegloriousunseen.com

The Glorious Unseen is a Christian rock/contemporary worship band from Nashville, Tennessee. Before signing with BEC Recordings, lead vocalist Ben Crist wrote and played many of the band's songs in his home church, The Anchor Fellowship. The band released their first album, Tonight the Stars Speak, in 2007. Crist got his start in the music industry by performing in the worship band at the Atlanta Vineyard.

== History ==
The Glorious Unseen released their first album, Tonight the Stars Speak, on October 23, 2007 through BEC Recordings. In November 2008, the band then released a digital EP titled The Cries of the Broken.

Their second album, The Hope That Lies In You, was released on August 25, 2009.

== Band Changes and a new album ==
In 2010 lead singer Ben Crist started an internship with the International House of Prayer in Kansas City. The band members went their separate ways when it was clear that he was supposed to stay in Kansas City. Ben is currently still serving at IHOP. In December 2011, Ben Crist let people know through an interview that there would be a new TGU album coming in 2012. The band will be made up of people serving alongside him in Kansas City. During the month of April 2012, Ben Crist ran a fundraiser through the Kickstarter website to help record and release his third album by The Glorious Unseen, titled "Lovesick".

Guitar player Ryan Stubbs released an album titled The Waking Cardinal.

== Members ==
=== Current members ===
- Ben Crist – vocals, guitar

=== Former members ===
- Ryan Stubbs – guitar
- Ben Harms – bass guitar
- Chris Vicari – drums
- Adam Smith - keyboard, guitar, trumpet
- Patrick Copeland – piano
- David Lim – guitar, piano
- Adam Wright – guitar formerly of Mortal Treason
- Jonathan Todryk - drums
- Matt James - drums, guitar

== Discography ==
=== Studio albums ===
Released	Title	Label(s)
October 23, 2007	Tonight the Stars Speak	BEC Recordings
August 25, 2009	The Hope That Lies in You	BEC Recordings
October 9, 2012	Lovesick	BEC Recordings

=== Studio EPs ===
Released	Title	Label(s)
2005	Embracing The Call	(independent)
November 11, 2008	The Cries of the Broken	BEC Recordings
July 14, 2009	How He Loves	BEC Recordings
