= Innova (album) =

Studio album by Fireflight
- Released: May 5, 2015
- Genre: Christian alternative rock, electropop, indie rock
- Length: 43:52
- Label: Independent
- Producer: Geoff Duncan, Joshua Silverberg, Rusty Varenkamp, Kipp Williams

Fireflight chronology
Now (2012)	Innova (2015)	Re•Imag•Innova (2017)

Innova (stylized, INNOVA) is the sixth studio album by Fireflight. The band independently released the album on May 5, 2015. This album was funded by a crowdfunding project. Fireflight worked with Geoff Duncan, Joshua Silverberg, Rusty Varenkamp, and Kipp Williams in the production and writing of this album, with vocalist Dawn Michele being the only band member to contribute compositions.

== Critical reception ==
Professional ratings
Review scores
Source	Rating
365 Days of Inspiring Media	5/5 stars
CCM Magazine	4/5 stars
Christian Music Review	4.0/5
CM Addict	3/5 stars
FDRMX	4.2 stars on a 5 point scale
Indie Vision Music	3/5 stars
Jesus Freak Hideout	3/5 stars 3.5/5 stars 2.5/5 stars
Jesus Wired	8.5/10 stars
Louder Than the Music	4/5 stars
New Release Tuesday	4/5 stars

Giving the album four stars at CCM Magazine, Andy Argyrakis states, "Longtime listeners and newcomers alike are sure to latch on to Fireflight's themes of perseverance and rejuvenation, alongside its standard hard rock stylings (now enhanced by electronic and stadium-ready pop elements) to further reinforce this fresh and fruitful new chapter." Mark Rice, awarding the album three stars for Jesus Freak Hideout, writes, "INNOVA packages a familiar message inside a new soundtrack, and does it proficiently, but not necessarily memorably." In a three star review by Indie Vision Music, Lee Brown says, "INNOVA excites with high-octane songs balanced with wonderfully intimate ballads." Awarding the album three and a half stars from Jesus Freak Hideout, Roger Gelwicks writes, "Fireflight is at their fullest potential when they're performing the music they earnestly want to make, and that makes INNOVA a winner." David Craft, writing a two and a half star review for Jesus Freak Hideout, describes, "INNOVA will certainly be a polarizing project, and may or (hopefully) may not reflect a permanent shift in the band's genre."

Rating the album a perfect five stars by 365 Days of Inspiring Media, Jonathan Andre responds, "Fireflight have done a tremendously wonderful job at creating INNOVA and all its 12 songs." Designating the album four stars at New Release Tuesday, Mary Nikkel writes, "INNOVA is both heartfelt and musically refreshing". Abby Baracskai, awarding the album a 4.0 out of five from Christian Music Review, says, "the messages on this album are inspiring and uplifting and take you on a roller coaster ride of emotions". Giving the album eight and a half stars from Jesus Wired, Stephanie Crail writes, "a solid fifth studio album." Andrew Funderburk, awarding the album three stars for CM Addict, states, "INNOVA is not in any way an entire 'miss,' but it could be a bit of a curveball for their already established fanbase ... And while the album isn’t bad, it holds the potential to get lost in the sea of the many other dub-step/electronic voices that are already out there." Rating the album four stars at Louder Than the Music, Philip Aldis states, it is like an energy drink "Open the can and stand well back." Jessica Morris, awarding the album 4.2 out of five stars for FDRMX, writes, "Bold, convicting, strong and fearless; INNOVA was worth the wait."

== Track listing ==
No.	Title	Writer(s)	Length
1.	"Keep Fighting"	Dawn Michele, Rusty Varenkamp	4:08
2.	"Lightning"	Michele, Joshua Silverberg	3:52
3.	"I've Got the Power"	Michele, Silverberg, Kipp Williams	3:28
4.	"Here and Now"	Michele, Geoff Duncan	4:02
5.	"Safety" (featuring Stephen Christian of Anberlin)	Michele, Varenkamp	3:21
6.	"Resuscitate"	Michele, Silverberg, Williams	3:17
7.	"The Fallout"	Michele, Silverberg, Williams	3:21
8.	"Easy to Break"	Michele, Williams	3:10
9.	"We Are Alive"	Michele, Silverberg, Williams	3:15
10.	"Out of My Head"	Michele, Varenkamp	3:45
11.	"This Is Our Time"	Michele, Silverberg	4:00
12.	"Light Inside"	Michele, Duncan, Varenkamp	4:19
Total length:			43:52

== Charts ==
Chart (2015)	Peak position
US Top Alternative Albums (Billboard)	18
US Christian Albums (Billboard)	10
US Independent Albums (Billboard)	14
US Top Rock Albums (Billboard)	27
