= Subseven =

American Christian rock band

- Origin: Weatherford, Oklahoma, U.S.
- Genres: Christian rock, emo, post-hardcore
- Years active: 1999–2005, 2015
- Label: Flicker
- Members: Wesley Fite; Clint McManaman; Caleb Wilkerson; Jacob Sullivan; Shaun Brown
- Past members: Reed Corbin; Smokey Emerson; Evan Crowley

Subseven (sometimes styled as sub7even or subseven) was a Christian rock band formed in 1999 in Weatherford, Oklahoma. They played for four years as an independent in the Midwest, where they released one album and one EP and gained a large local fan base. In 2003, they signed a record deal with Flicker Records and soon after released Subseven: the EP. One year later they released their final album, Free to Conquer.

The band's members included Wesley Fite, Clint McManaman, Reed Corbin, Caleb Wilkerson and Jake Sullivan before their breakup in December 2005. Since their breakup in 2005, the band members have engaged in other musical activities, including other bands and solo projects. In November 2007, their bass guitarist, Reed Corbin, died from a heart attack at the age of 33.

In 2015, the band announced that they would be reuniting and playing a show on July 24, 2015 in Oklahoma City; they have not played a show since.

In 2024, member Clint McManaman was a guest on The BlackSheep Podcast, speaking about the formation, breakup, and future of the band.

== Members ==
Current members

- Wesley Fite – vocals, guitar (1999–2005, 2015)
- Clint McManaman – drums (1999–2005, 2015)
- Caleb Wilkerson – guitar (2003-2005, 2015)
- Jacob Sullivan – guitar (2003-2005, 2015)
- Shaun Brown – bass (2005, 2015)

Former members

- Reed Corbin – bass (1999–2005; died 2007)
- Smokey Emerson – guitar (1999–2003)
- Evan Crowley – guitar (2005)

== Discography ==
=== Studio albums ===
Album title	Label	Date
Free to Conquer	Flicker Records	March 15, 2005

=== EPs ===
EP title	Label	Date
Larusso EP	Independent	2001
Subseven: the EP	Flicker Records	May 4, 2004

=== Independent albums ===
Album title	Label	Date
The Black Album	Independent	2000

== Music videos ==
- "Emotion" – Filmed in January 2004
- "Free to Conquer" – Filmed summer of 2005
- "Hold On" – Filmed December 2005

After the video shoot of "Hold On" at the Green Door, the band announced that they would be breaking up, and played a farewell show to the audience that showed up to be in the video.
