= Staple (band) =

American Christian hardcore band

- Origin: Mechanicsburg, Ohio, United States
- Genres: Post-hardcore, hard rock, alternative rock, Christian hardcore punk
- Years active: 2000–2006, 2009–2014
- Labels: Flicker Records, Sony BMG
- Members: Darin Kiem; JM Haddix; Bob Miller; Ryan Pattengale; John Carnahan

Staple is a Christian hard rock/post-hardcore group from Mechanicsburg, Ohio. Staple was founded in 2000 when the members met at Rosedale Bible College in Ohio.

== History ==
=== The first era (2000–2006) ===
Staple released a full-length album and EP independently before signing to Flicker Records in 2004. They released their debut album, Staple, in 2004, followed by a second, Of Truth and Reconciliation, in 2005.

They toured with Disciple, the Showdown, Kids in the Way, Demon Hunter, Last Tuesday, Dizmas, Stalemate, the 7 Method and Spoken. Their 2005 album, Of Truth and Reconciliation, peaked at No. 49 on the Billboard Top Christian Albums chart.

On May 17, 2006, Staple announced that they would be breaking up at the end of the summer. In May 2006, Staple held a contest for fans to create a last tour T-shirt. The shirt was judged by Staple. Winners received two free admissions to one of the dates on the "Last Crusade" tour, a free copy of the printed shirt that they designed and a copy of Staple's CDs

=== The second era (2009–2014) ===
In February 2009, Darin Keim announced that Staple was reuniting with new members. Darin had been jamming and writing songs with Brando Hall (poor man’s riches, The Revival Sound) after touring together previously. In May, Darin announced that a new song called "Eager Hearts" would be put online, with two other songs to be uploaded in successive weeks. Brando left the band shortly after the recording. A blog was published stating that the two other songs were called "Perfect Dark" and "The Giant Sleeps No More", and that together with "Eager Hearts" these songs would make up The Gatekeeper EP.

The band appears to have broken up.

== Members ==
- Darin Keim - vocals (2000–2006, 2009–present)
- Bob Miller - bass guitar (2009–present)
- J.M. Haddix- drums (2009–present) (Sides of the North)
- Ryan Pattengale - guitar (2009–present) (Red Morning Voyage)
- John Carnahan - guitar (2009–present) (The Machine)

=== Former members ===
- Grant Beachy - drums (2000–2005)
- Brian Miller - guitar (2000–2006)
- Paul DeLozier - guitar (2005)
- Josh McNeal - drums (2006)
- Israel Beachy - bass guitar (2000–2006)
- Brando Hall - guitar (2009-2009)

== Influences ==
- Living Sacrifice
- Project 86
- Stavesacre
- Stalemate

== Discography ==
=== Albums ===
Year	Title	Peak chart positions	Label
Year	Title	Top Christian Albums	Label
2002	Staple	—	None (independent)
2003	Staple EP	—	None (independent)
2004	Staple	—	Flicker Records
2005	Of Truth + Reconciliation	49	Flicker Records
2009	The Gatekeeper EP	—	None (independent)

=== Singles ===
Year	Title	Chart positions		Album
Year	Title	Hot Christian Songs	ChristianRock.Net	Album
2002	"Good Grief"			Staple
2004	"Dictatorship Vs. Democracy (DVD)"		#5 (#1 ChristianHardrock)	Staple
2004	"Fists Afire"			Staple
2005	"Sound Of Silence"			Of Truth and Reconciliation
2005	"Gavels From Gunbarrels"			Of Truth and Reconciliation
2009	"Eager Hearts"			The Gatekeeper EP
