= Kids in the Way =

American Christian rock band

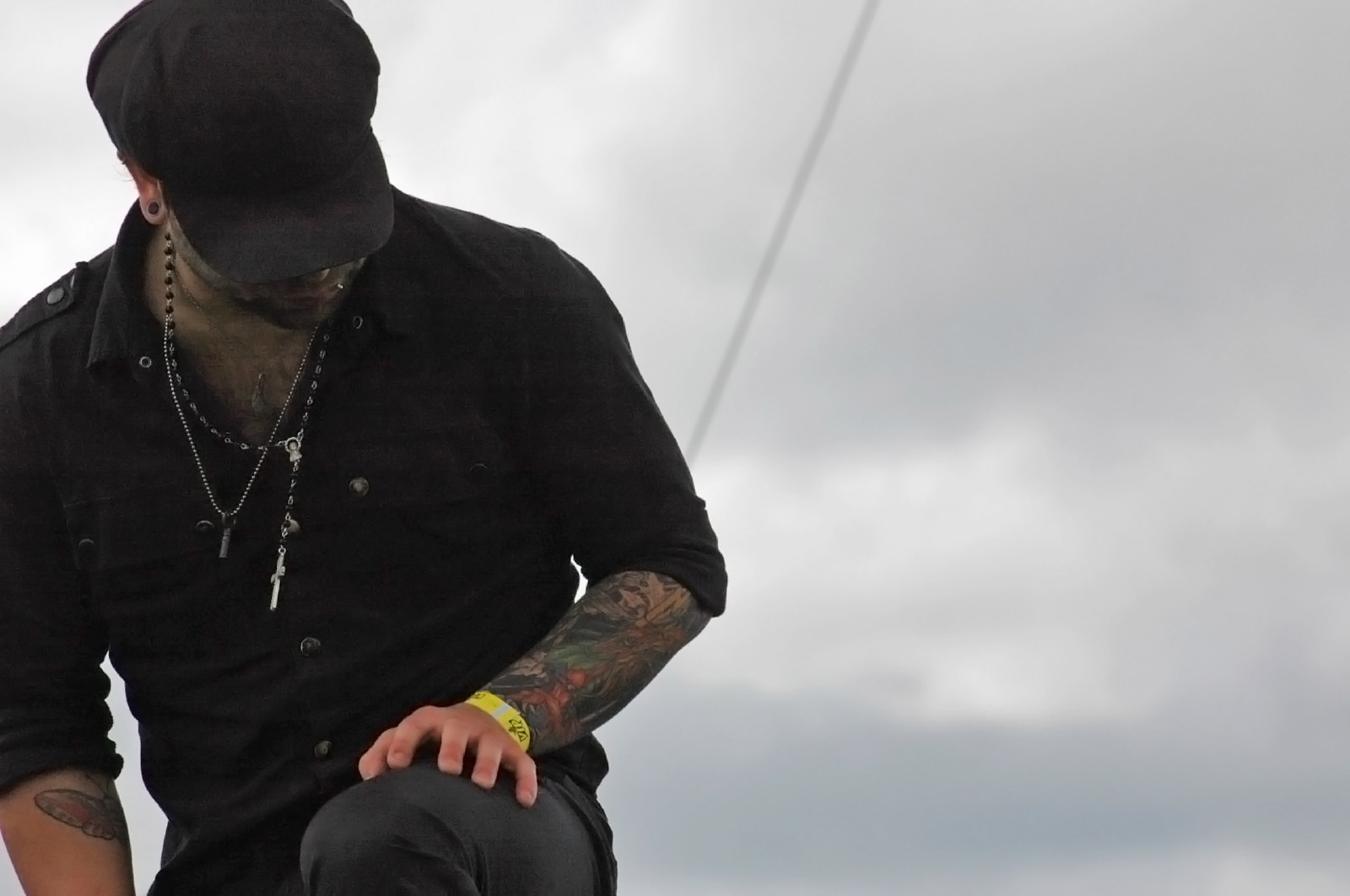
- David Pelsue, lead singer

Background information
- Also known as: K I D S
- Origin: Noblesville, Indiana, United States
- Genres: Christian rock, screamo
- Years active: 1997–2007, 2009–2012
- Label: Flicker
- Past members: David Pelsue; Nathan Hughes; Austin Cobb; Jonathan; Jeremie; Wille Bostic; Eric Carter; Rian Flynn; Nathan Ehman; Casey Ryan

Kids in the Way was an American Christian rock band formed in Noblesville, Indiana in 1997. They released three albums on Flicker Records and an unnamed EP in 2010 after which they disbanded. In 2016 they announced they were reuniting under the new name, KIDS.

== Biography ==
Kids in the Way was formed in 1997 by vocalist David Pelsue, guitarist Nathan Ehman, and the drummer Eric Carter. The band was previously known as Serenity and played a considerably lighter rock sound than when they were Kids in the Way. Kids in the Way released a self-titled EP which set them in place for further record releases and future shows with Audio Adrenaline which was important in their signing to Flicker Records. After releasing their debut album Safe from the Losing Fight, they were able to pick up spots touring with notable bands such as Fireflight, Pillar, and Relient K.

The band reunited in 2009 and started playing shows in and around their home state of Indiana. On January 12, 2010, they announced that they were working on an unnamed EP that they expected to release in March. In the US, it was released for a limited time in the iTunes Store. In 2012 guitarist Nathan Hughes revealed that the new album was a "no-go", and that new music would be coming from a "different band".

== Members ==
- David "Dave" Pelsue – lead vocals
- Nathan Hughes – rhythm guitar, backing vocals
- Austin Cobb – lead guitar
- Jonathan
- Jeremie
- Eric Carter – drums, backing vocals
- Wille Bostic – bass, backing vocals
- Rian Flynn – bass guitar, backing vocals (2004–2005)
- Nathan Ehman – guitars, backing vocals (2002–2007)

== Discography ==
Date of release	Title	Label
2002	Kids in the Way (EP)	Independent
December 26, 2003	Safe from the Losing Fight	Flicker Records
May 10, 2005	Apparitions of Melody	Flicker Records
September 18, 2007	A Love Hate Masquerade	Flicker Records
2010	Unnamed EP	
