= Fireflight =

American Christian rock band from Florida

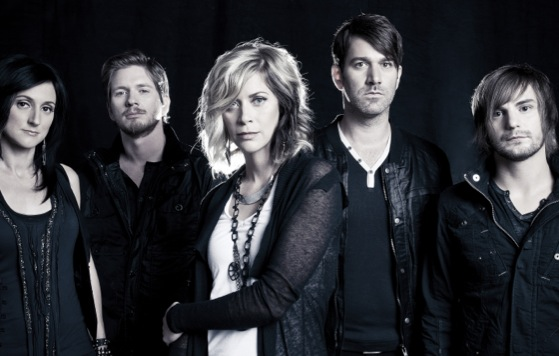

Background information
- Origin: Orlando, Florida
- Genres: Christian rock; hard rock; alternative metal; electropop
- Years active: 1999 – Present
- Labels: Essential; Flicker; RockFest Records
- Members: Dawn Michele; Wendy Drennen; Glenn Drennen; Justin Cox
- Past members: Phee Shorb; Adam McMillion
- Website: fireflightrock.com

Fireflight is an American Christian rock band formed in Eustis, Florida, in 1999. The band was signed by Flicker Records.

The band currently consists of vocalist Dawn Michele, Glenn and Wendy Drennen, guitarist and bassist respectively, and guitarist Justin Cox (who left in 2013 but rejoined in 2019). They have released seven studio albums and have played in tours, including ShoutFest, Revelation Generation and Winter Jam. The band has also been featured on the Scars Remain tour with Disciple, Family Force 5, and Decyfer Down. Their fourth full-length album For Those Who Wait (2010) was nominated in the 2011 Grammy Awards.

Their most recent album, Who We Are: The Head and the Heart, was released in October 2020.

== History ==
The band initially formed when Glenn Drennen started a band with his wife Wendy and school friend Justin Cox. While attending a graduation service for Glenn's little brother, Glenn and Wendy heard Dawn Futch (later Dawn Michele) singing during the service. They asked her to be in the group and she agreed. Through a mutual friend, the band met Phee Shorb.

The name "Fireflight" was suggested by Dawn Michele shortly before they did a small performance at a church. The name has no meaning, as suggested by the band in an interview with Jesus Freak Hideout.

They independently released the album Glam-rök, which was produced by Cox, in 2002. They followed up with the five-track EP On the Subject of Moving Forward in 2004 before they were signed to the major record label Flicker Records.

After years of touring, Fireflight released their major label debut album The Healing of Harms in 2006 with two No. 1 singles, "You Decide" and "Waiting". The album peaked at No. 37 on Billboard magazine's Top Christian Albums chart. The song "You Decide", featuring Josh Brown of Day of Fire, was the top request at TVU music television in August 2006. It was the second most played song on Christian Rock radio stations according to the September 1, 2006, R&R magazine airplay chart, No. 11 on the R&R Christian Hit Radio charts on October 23, 2006, and No. 1 on the Christian Radio Weekly chart. On Billboard's chart, it peaked at No. 27 on the Hot Christian Singles chart, and it finished in the Top 25 of 2006 for the network radio station Air1.

Their second single, "Waiting", reached No. 1 R&R and CRW Christian Rock chart and stayed there for three consecutive weeks during the month of February 2007. The band concurrently released the songs "It's You", "Star of the Show", and "Attitude" to Christian Hit Radio stations.

During another extensive year of touring, the band was experiencing an emotional roller coaster while writing their album Unbreakable. Michele described how stressful and intense writing the album was:

It almost felt like things were out of control. We'd gone through a difficult year as a band with a lot of emotional ups and downs. We basically lived together in a van while writing the new album, and that put us in a pressure cooker. All the stresses were magnified because you're completely out of your comfort zone, and it really does crank up the intensity of the writing. We poured all of our hope, sorrow, anger, dreams and fears into the music.

Fireflight debuted clips of the single "Unbreakable" in promos for the new Bionic Woman television series. "Unbreakable" is the title song from their album released in March 2008. The single rose to the number one spot on CRW and R&R's Christian Rock charts seven weeks after its release. The band's third number one rock song was the most added song on Christian Hit Radio radio stations in February 2008. It ended the year 2008 as the 14th most-played song Christian CHR radio according to R&R magazine's Christian CHR chart. The band played at Winter Jam 2010.

Fireflight's fourth full-length album entitled For Those Who Wait was released on February 9, 2010. They shot music videos for both "For Those Who Wait", which came out June 1 on their official YouTube channel, and the lead single "Desperate". "Desperate" was unveiled on February 9, 2010, to coincide with the release of the new album. The album peaked at No. 5 on Billboard Hot Christian Albums and is their highest-charting CD. "Desperate" was once a No. 1 single on christianrock.net and on BDSradio.com's Christian Rock chart, and it peaked at No. 3 on the Christian CHR chart on the same website.

The next single to be released was "For Those Who Wait". The video for the title track was released in May. On November 25, 2010, Fireflight's band trailer was stolen. It contained approximately $80,000 worth of equipment and merchandise. FireFlight was nominated for Best Rock/Rap Gospel Album for the 53rd Grammys; they lost to Switchfoot. In February 2011, the band's original drummer Phee Shorb left the band to become a Christian speaker; he was replaced by Adam McMillion.

The band released their fifth album, Now, on March 6, 2012, which became their most chart-topping and fastest selling album, reaching No. 1 on the Contemporary Christian Charts. Its leading track, "Stay Close", was released in the Winter Jam Tour 2011. The band released a music video for "Stay Close" on YouTube on their official Vevo account. The album has sold more than 40,000 copies as of July 15, 2012.

In early 2014, Fireflight announced that they had asked and been granted a release from their recording contract and were launching a Pledgemusic campaign to raise money for their sixth studio album, to be released independently. On June 25, 2014, it was revealed that the title of the new album would be titled Innova. On September 5, 2014, it was announced that Innova would be released May 5, 2015. On March 3, 2017, they released RE•IMAG•INNOVA, an EP with reimagined selections from Innova.

Guitarist Justin Cox rejoined the group in 2019. The band's seventh album, Who We Are: The Head and the Heart, was released on October 23, 2020.

In a 2024 interview, vocalist Dawn Michele stated that the band is "semi-retired". However, Michele continues to pursue a music career independent of the band; in 2026, she formed a Christian rock group, Altira.

== Band members ==
Current members

- Dawn Michele – lead vocals (1999–present)
- Wendy Drennen – bass guitar, backing vocals (1999–present)
- Glenn Drennen – rhythm guitar (1999–present)
- Justin Cox – lead guitar, backing vocals, keyboards (1999–2013, 2019–present)

Former members

- Phee Shorb – drums (2002–2011)
- Adam McMillion – drums (2011–2015, 2020)

== Discography ==
- The Healing of Harms (2006)
- Unbreakable (2008)
- For Those Who Wait (2010)
- Now (2012)
- Innova (2015)
- Who We Are: The Head and the Heart (2020)

== Music videos ==
Year	Song	Album
2006	"You Decide" (featuring Josh Brown of Day of Fire)	The Healing of Harms
2008	"Unbreakable"	Unbreakable
2010	"Desperate"	For Those Who Wait
2010	"For Those Who Wait"	For Those Who Wait
2012	"Stay Close"	Now
2015	"We Are Alive"	Innova
2018	"I Won't Look Back"	non-album single
2018	"Die Free" (featuring Kevin Young of Disciple)	non-album single
2020	"Who We Are"	Who We Are: The Head and the Heart

The video for the song "For Those Who Wait" was nominated for a Dove Award for Short Form Music Video of the Year at the 42nd GMA Dove Awards.

== Awards ==
=== GMA Dove Awards ===
Year	Award	Result
2009	Artist of the Year	Nominated
2009	Rock Recorded Song of the Year ("The Hunger")	Nominated
2009	Rock/Contemporary Recorded Song of the Year ("Unbreakable")	Nominated
2009	Rock/Contemporary Album of the Year (Unbreakable)	Nominated
2010	Rock/Contemporary Recorded Song of the Year ("You Gave Me a Promise")	Nominated
2011	Short Form Music Video of the Year ("For Those Who Wait")	Nominated
2013	Rock Album of the Year ("Now")	Nominated
2015	Rock Song of the Year ("Safety")	Nominated

=== Grammy Awards ===
Year	Award	Result
2011	Best Rock or Rap Gospel Album ("For Those Who Wait")	Nominated
