= Josh Brown (musician) =

American singer (born 1976)

Joshua Brown
- Also known as: Josh Brown
- Born: 1976 (age 49–50)
- Origin: Jackson, Tennessee
- Genres: Christian rock, hard rock
- Years active: 1993–present

Joshua Brown (born 1976) is an American singer who is best known as the lead vocalist of Christian rock band Day of Fire. He was also the original lead vocalist of Full Devil Jacket and was a featured vocalist on Fireflight's hit song "You Decide" from their album The Healing of Harms.

== Biography ==
=== Early life and Full Devil Jacket ===
Josh Brown wanted to be a rock-star at a very early age. He began songwriting at the age of 14, forming a band called Sludge. At the age of 15 he was already partying, doing drugs, and drinking heavily. He started a new heavy metal band called the Voodoo Hippies in 1993 (they changed their to name to Full Devil Jacket in 1995 after discovering a Detroit band already had that name).

In late 1998 the band signed to Island/Def Jam Records after playing in the Tampa, FL area. They were on tour with bands such as Creed, Nickelback, and Type O Negative, playing at Woodstock '99. Shortly afterwards they released their EP "A Wax Box...". On March 7, 2000 the band released their debut album "Full Devil Jacket" which has 11 tracks. They were featured in the Tattoo the Earth tour with many bands such as Mudvayne, Slipknot, Sepultura, Slayer, and Coal Chamber with Metallica headlining one show. Their song "Wanna Be Martyr" was put on the Scream 3 soundtrack in 2000, while "Green Iron Fist" (released April 2000) made MTV's Heavy Metal 2000.

While on tour with Creed in 2000, Brown suffered a severe heroin overdose and nearly died. Many believe this was when he started to turn his life around through rehab and prayer.

In March 2001 the band was scheduled to fly to L.A. to start recording their second album. During the writing of the second album, Brown officially returned to his faith in God, said he felt "no peace" in making the second album and left the band. He had a nervous breakdown and was unable to write or sing. The album was unfinished and remains unreleased to this day. Once Brown announced he was leaving, Michael Reaves also decided to leave. The band was supposed to go back on tour in September/October 2001. Some projects the band was working on at the time included "Shelter", "Superdysfunctional Hero", "All Apologies", "Bottle", and "Black Days".

In 2010, Brown and Full Devil Jacket played several reunion shows to raise money for guitarist Michael Reaves, who was battling prostate cancer. He died in 2011 at the age of 52.

On January 14, 2015 it was announced that F.D.J. signed a worldwide deal with eOne Music with plans on releasing a brand new LP later this year. Valley of Bones would soon be revealed to be the name of the album and 1st single to be released on March 31, 2015 according to the leading rock news outlet LoudWire. The album, released March 31, contains 10 new songs and feature cover art of a painting by singer Josh Brown.

=== Day of Fire ===
Brown eventually formed a new band, Day of Fire with guitarist Gregg Hionis and they began working on their first album. For the second album they added Joe Pangallo on guitar, with brother Chris Pangallo on bass and Zach Simms on drums. In 2004 they released their debut album "Day of Fire". Their debut won a Dove Award for Rock Album of the Year and was nominated for a Grammy Award.

The band recently released their third album, "Losing All", on the Razor & Tie label.

Some former members of Full Devil Jacket had formed a band called Waxbox but were short-lived and never released an album.

== Collaborations ==
While a member of Day of Fire, Brown was featured on Fireflight's debut single "You Decide". The song was the top request at TVU music television in August 2006. It was the second most played song on Christian Rock radio stations according to the September 1, 2006 R&R magazine airplay chart, #11 on the R&R Christian Hit Radio charts on October 23, 2006, and #1 on the Christian Radio Weekly chart. On Billboard's chart, it peaked at #27 on the Hot Christian Singles chart and it finished in the Top 25 of 2006 for the network radio station Air1.

He also co-wrote a song with Chris Daughtry for Daughtry's album Leave This Town.
