= Flicker Records =

- Parent company: Sony Music Entertainment (SME)
- Founded: 2000
- Founder: Audio Adrenaline
- Distributor(s): EMI (2000–2006); Provident Label Group (2006–present)
- Genre: Christian rock
- Country of origin: United States
- Location: Franklin, Tennessee
- Official website: flickerrecords.com

Flicker Records is a Christian music record label based in Franklin, Tennessee. It was founded by members of Christian rock group Audio Adrenaline. The label mainly focuses on rock/pop rock artists, though it also created a subsidiary, Big House Kids, for Christian children's music.

The label was distributed by EMI starting in 1999. Since March 24, 2006, Flicker has been a member of Provident Label Group, a subsidiary of Sony Music Entertainment.

== Former artists ==
- eleventyseven (active)
- Everyday Sunday (disbanded)
- Fireflight (active, RockFest Records)
- Kids in the Way (disbanded)
- Mortal Treason (disbanded)
- Nevertheless (disbanded)
- Pillar (band) (active, independent)
- Stereo Motion (disbanded, was originally called Phat Chance)
- Staple (disbanded)
- Subseven (disbanded)
- The Swift (disbanded)
- Until June (disbanded)
- Wavorly (independent)

== See also ==
- List of Christian record labels
