= December 1965 =

Month of 1965

<<	December 1965					>>
Su	Mo	Tu	We	Th	Fr	Sa
			1	2	3	4
5	6	7	8	9	10	11
12	13	14	15	16	17	18
19	20	21	22	23	24	25
26	27	28	29	30	31

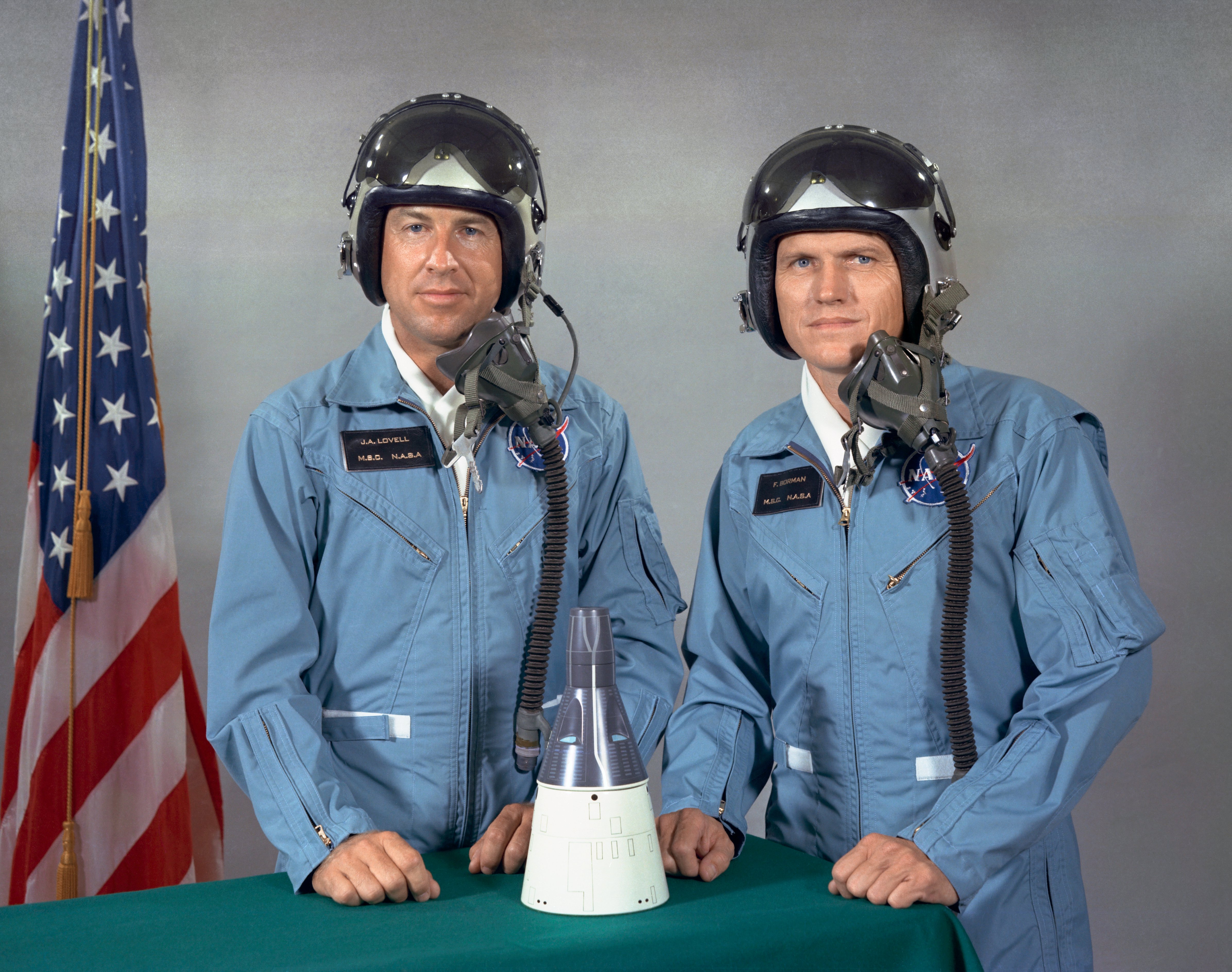
Gemini 7's Lovell and Borman

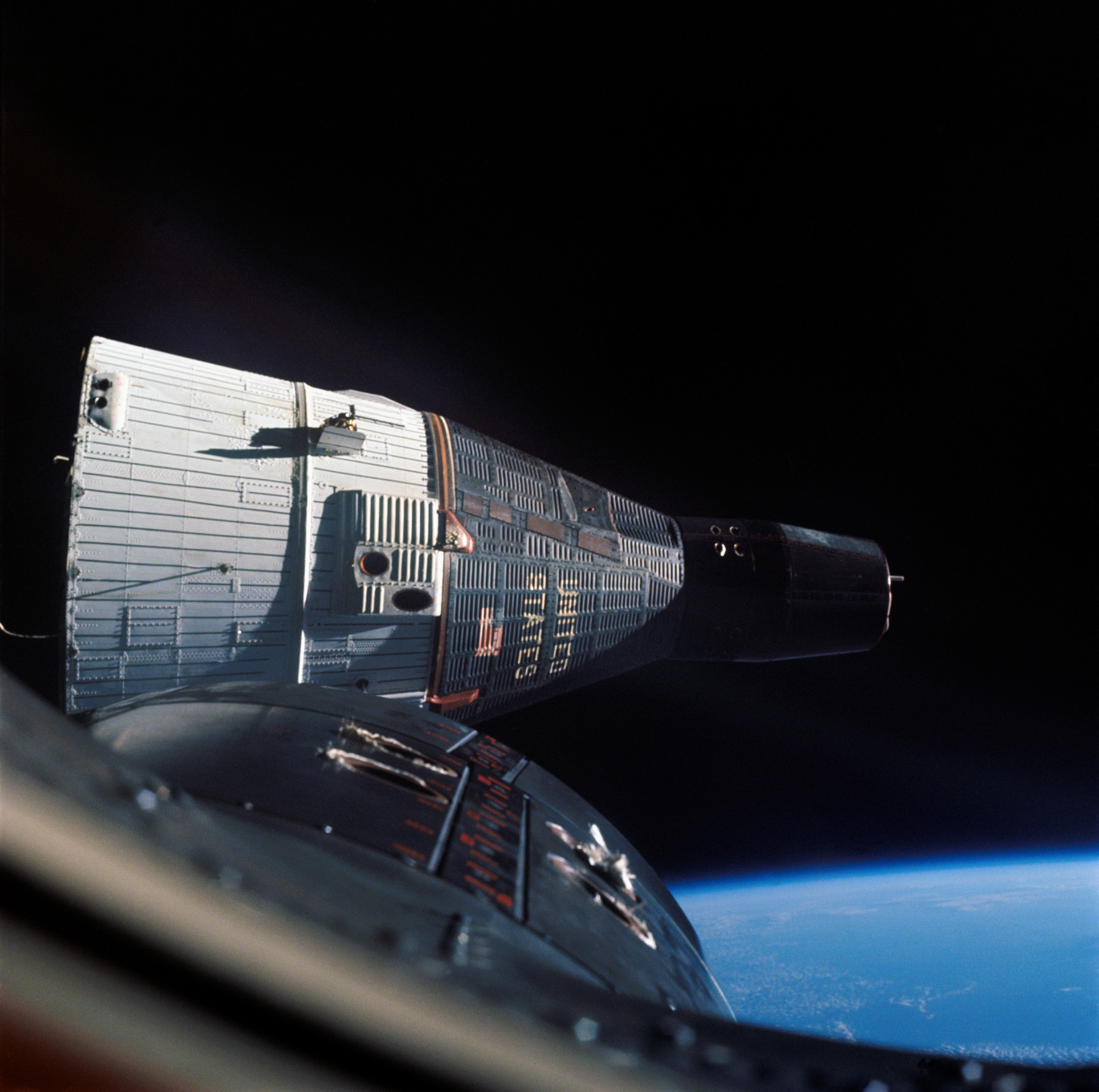
December 15, 1965: Gemini 7 and Gemini 6 make first orbital rendezvous

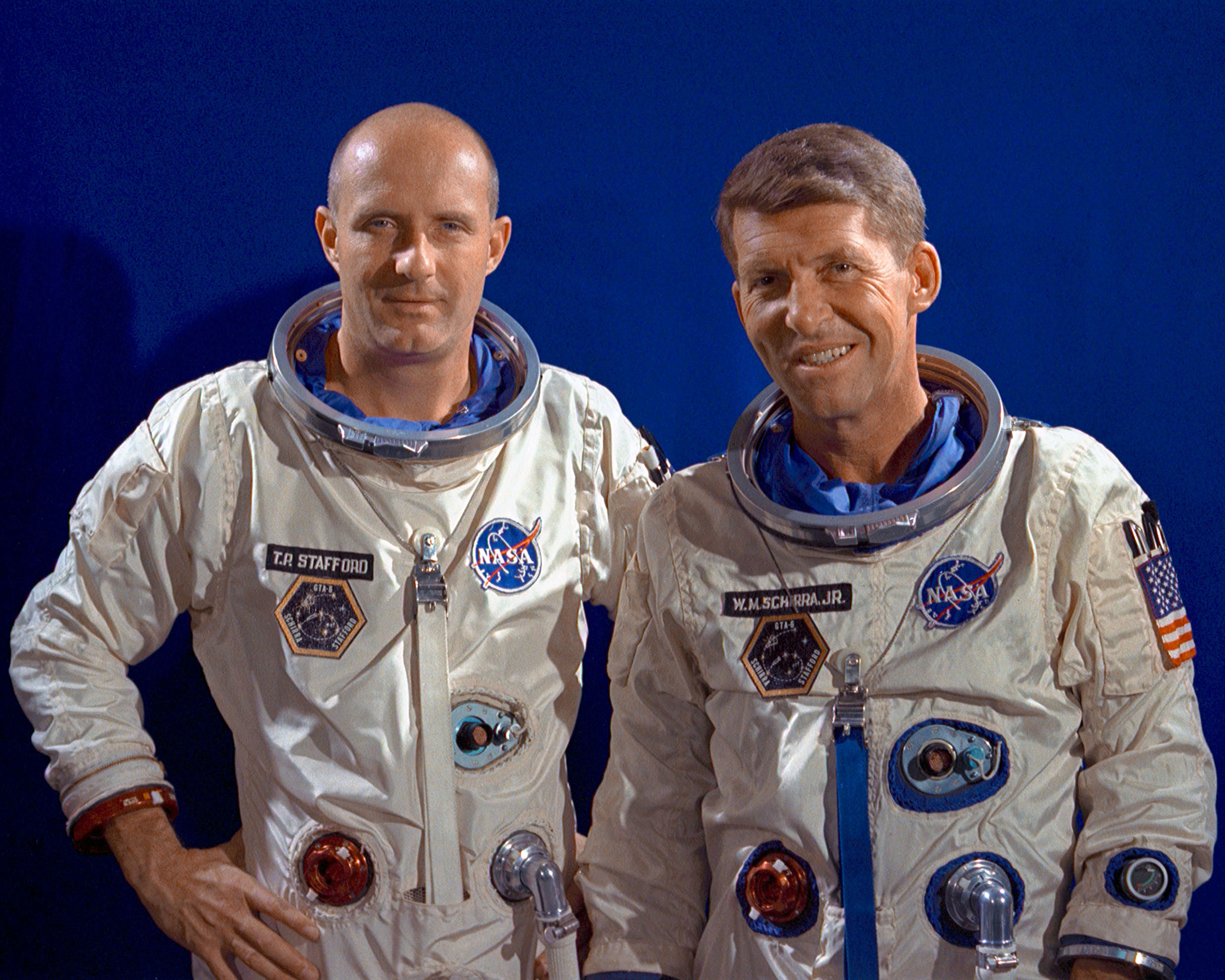
Gemini 6's Stafford and Schirra

The following events occurred in December 1965:

== December 1, 1965 (Wednesday) ==
- The village of 't Haantje, Drenthe, in the Netherlands, narrowly escaped a disaster, when a French company drilling for gas began to lose control of the enormous gas pressure, resulting in a huge gas eruption. The ground around the hole caved in, swallowing all of the drilling equipment. The gas eruption would eventually be stopped by a cement injection from a new drilling hole. A small lake surrounded by a forest would become a permanent reminder of the near-miss.
- Billy Jones became the first African-American to play in the Atlantic Coast Conference, integrating the exclusively white college basketball circuit in the south Atlantic states in Maryland, Virginia, North Carolina, South Carolina and Florida. Jones played briefly in a game for the University of Maryland against Penn State.
- The first airlift of Cuban émigrés into the United States began, with 75 Cuban citizens, mostly women and children, taking off from Varadero on a Pan American Airways DC-7, and arriving in Miami one hour later.
- NASA's George E. Mueller gave Marshall Space Flight Center (MSFC) the "green light" to begin the orbiting S-IVB Workshop and asked MSFC Director Wernher von Braun to develop two program development plans, one for an unpressurized version of the Workshop, and one for the pressurized version, in time for presentation at the next meeting of the Manned Space Flight Management Council. Mueller, the Associate Administrator for Manned Space Flight, directed that the plans should address experiments to be carried in space, as well as funding arrangements where development work should be done. At von Braun's request, William Ferguson was appointed as the Workshop Project Manager.
- The United Church in Jamaica and the Cayman Islands was founded by a merger of the Protestant denominations "Presbyterian Church in Jamaica" and "Congregational Union of Jamaica".
- The Border Security Force was established in India as a special force to guard the country's borders with Pakistan, the People's Republic of China, Nepal, and Bhutan.

== December 2, 1965 (Thursday) ==
- The U.S. Navy aircraft carrier USS Enterprise became the first nuclear-powered warship to see combat when it launched air strikes at the Viet Cong near Biên Hòa, South Vietnam.
- Died: Hugh Dryden, 67, NASA Deputy Administrator since 1958, died of cancer.

== December 3, 1965 (Friday) ==
- Princess Cruises, an ocean liner service which would be made famous by the 1980s television series The Love Boat, began services with the departure of a chartered ship, the Canadian Pacific Lines steamer Princess Patricia, from Los Angeles on the first of ten 14-day cruises along Mexico's west coast, with stops at La Paz, Puerto Vallarta, Acapulco and Mazatlán. Seattle businessman Stanley McDonald inaugurated the Princess line after a six-month practice run in 1962, with the steamer Yarmouth, coinciding with the operation of the Seattle World's Fair, which had been in progress. On December 15, 1967, McDonald would double his fleet with the departure of a second ship, which he would rename from Italia to Princess Italia.
- Ten Royal Air Force jet fighters from Britain arrived in Lusaka, following Zambia's appeal for British help against Rhodesia. British Prime Minister Harold Wilson said that a battalion of 600 Royal Scots Army infantrymen would follow as long as Zambia's President Kenneth Kaunda agreed that they would remain under British command while on Zambian soil. Wilson also said that no British troops would cross into Rhodesia unless Rhodesia either attempted to attack Zambia, or attempted to shut off power from the Kariba Dam, across the Zambezi River, that supplied hydroelectric power to both nations. President Kaunda had asked Britain to invade Rhodesia in order to seize control of the Kariba Dam and to occupy the northern part of Rhodesia that bordered Zambia.
- In South Vietnam, an unidentified United States Marine stationed at Da Nang allegedly beheaded the shrine's golden image of Gautama Buddha at the Khue Bac Pagoda. By December 8, 500 Buddhist protesters marched through the streets of Da Nang after Khue Bac's principal monk, Thich Giac Ngo, threatened to disembowel himself to atone for allowing the Buddha to be destroyed. U.S. Ambassador Henry Cabot Lodge promised to investigate the incident fully and to compensate the monastery for the damage, which included an injunction from other Buddhist monks that the Khue Bac Pagoda was "contaminated and could not be used again".
- At Addis Ababa, Ethiopia, 35 of the 36 members of the Organization of African Unity threatened to sever diplomatic relations with the United Kingdom, unless the British government ended the rebellion of Rhodesia by December 15. The exception was The Gambia, which did not have a representative present at the five-hour session.
- The Who released their debut album My Generation in the UK, followed by an American release the following year. The album contains the title track, which is considered to be the band's signature song.
- The Beatles released their album Rubber Soul in the United Kingdom, followed by an American release of Rubber Soul that included most of the songs, along with some that had been omitted from the U.S. release of Help!. On the same day, a Beatles song that was not on the album, "Day Tripper", was released as a single. On the other side (the "B" side) of the same 45 rpm record was "We Can Work It Out", which would receive more airplay and would reach number one in the United Kingdom and the United States, making it the most popular "B" side song in history.
- Born: Katarina Witt, East German figure skater and Olympic gold medalist; in Staaken
- Died:
  - Ike Richman, 52, American lawyer and co-owner of the Philadelphia 76ers basketball team, suffered a fatal heart attack in Boston while watching the 76ers play against the Boston Celtics. courtside. Richman, who had been instrumental in bringing the Syracuse Nationals to Philadelphia, collapsed while sitting on the 76ers' bench during the first quarter, when the teams were tied, 13–13. The team was informed of his death at halftime, and went on to win, 119 to 103.
  - Erich Apel, 48, East German economist and Chairman of the State Planning Commission, shot himself to death in his office at the House of Ministries in East Berlin.

== December 4, 1965 (Saturday) ==
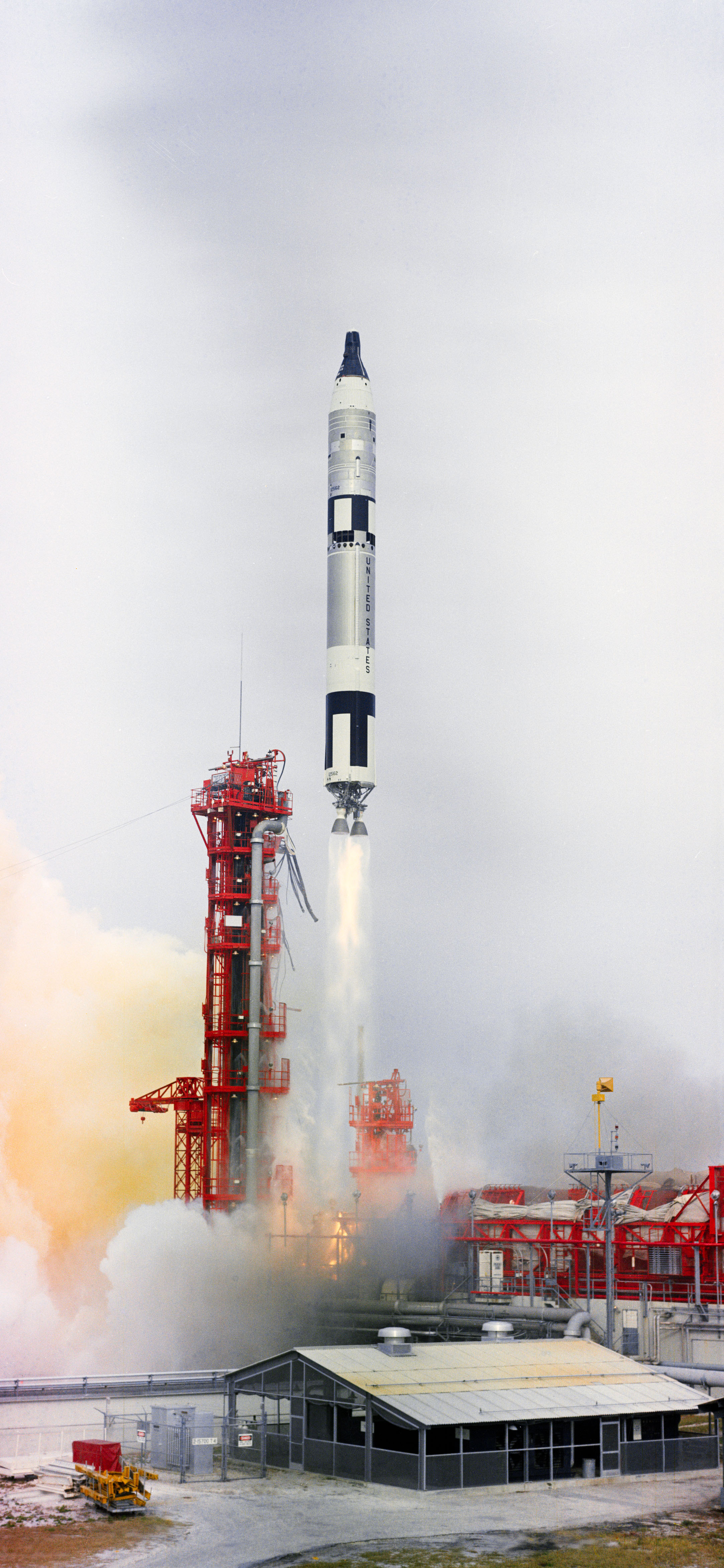
Gemini 7 was launched...

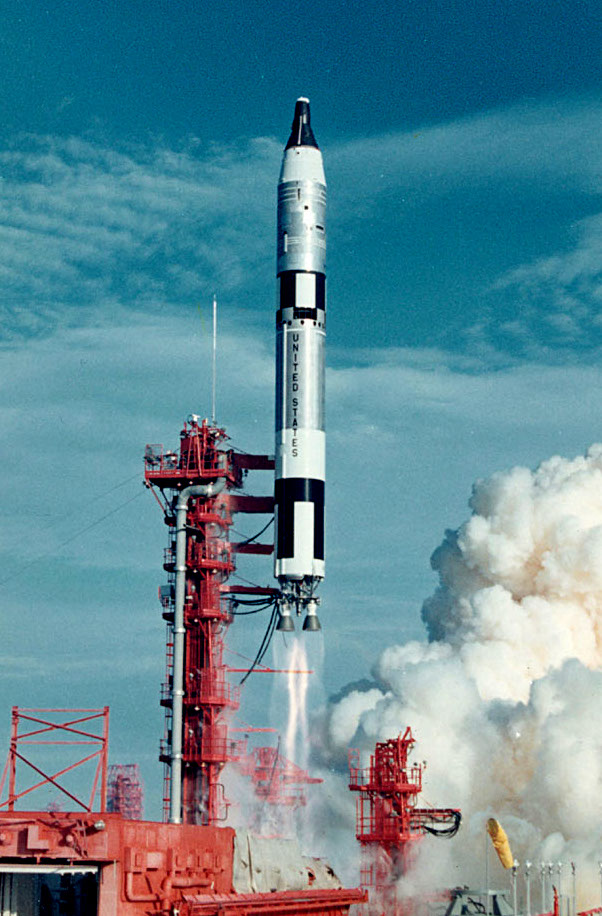
... before Gemini 6A (December 15)

- Gemini 7, the fourth crewed mission of the Gemini program, was launched into orbit from complex 19 at Cape Kennedy at 1:30 in the afternoon. The primary objectives of the mission, flown by command pilot Astronaut Frank Borman and pilot Astronaut James A. Lovell, Jr., were demonstrating crewed orbital flight for approximately 14 days and evaluating the physiological effects of a long-duration flight on the crew. Among the secondary objectives were providing a rendezvous target for the Gemini 6A spacecraft, orbital station-keeping with the second stage of the Gemini launch vehicle and with spacecraft No. 6, and using lightweight pressure suits. Borman and Lovell would team up again three years later on Apollo 8, as they and William A. Anders would become the first humans to orbit the Moon.
- Eastern Air Lines Flight 853, a propeller-driven Lockheed Super Constellation with 54 people on board, and TWA Flight 42, a Boeing 707-131B carrying 58 people, collided in mid-air over Carmel, New York, with the Boeing's left wing striking the Super Constellation's tail. The TWA flight landed safely at John F. Kennedy International Airport in New York City, despite having 30 feet (9.1 m) of its left wing sheared off after taking evasive action, while the Eastern plane crashed in a pasture on Hunt Mountain near Danbury, Connecticut, and caught fire, killing four people of the 54 on board. The TWA flight from San Francisco to New York had been assigned at 11,000 feet (3,400 m) altitude, while the Eastern plane from Boston to Newark, New Jersey, was assigned to 10,000 feet (3,000 m) when the two collided.
- The Grateful Dead played their first show under their new name, after originally billing themselves as The Warlocks, as promoter Ken Kesey held the second Acid Test concert. The event took place at 43 South Fifth Street in San Jose, California, after a Rolling Stones show nearby.
- Jaber Al-Ahmad Al-Sabah took office as the new Prime Minister of Kuwait, after his brother, the previous premier, ascended the throne as the new Emir of Kuwait. Jaber himself would become the new Emir in 1977 on the death of his brother.
- Saudi Arabia and Qatar signed a boundary agreement that delimited their land boundaries and their offshore drilling sites as well.
- Born: Veronica Taylor (stage name for Kathleen Charlotte McInerney), American voice actress best known for her dubbing work of Ash Ketchum in the Pokémon series for its first eight seasons; in New York City

== December 5, 1965 (Sunday) ==
- The first spontaneous political demonstration in the Soviet Union, and that nation's first civil rights protest, began in Pushkin Square in Moscow, where protesters gathered in response to the arrest of writers Andrei Sinyavsky and Yuli Daniel in what would later be called the "Glasnost Meeting" (Miting Glasnosty). The date selected was the Soviet Union's 30th annual Constitution Day holiday, and the location was the square named for one of Russia's most revered writers, Alexander Pushkin. Human rights activist Lyudmila Alexeyeva would recall later that while Vladimir Bukovsky believed there were 200 participants when the demonstration began at 6:00 in the evening, she had been present and believed that it was a smaller number; 20 people were detained by KGB agents, but released after a few hours, although 40 of the known participants were expelled from their scientific institutes. Mathematician Alexander Esenin-Volpin was among the speakers who urged that Sinyavsky and Daniel be given the fair and open trial guaranteed by the 1936 constitution, and the Constitution Day protest was repeated every year until the close of the 1970s.
- In the Philippine Sea about 70 miles (110 km) from the Ryukyu Islands of Japan, a United States Navy Douglas A-4E Skyhawk aircraft carrying a B43 nuclear bomb fell into the ocean from the aircraft carrier USS Ticonderoga. The jet crashed, killing its pilot, Lieutenant (j.g.) Douglas M. Webster. The aircraft, the thermonuclear weapon and Webster's remains would never be recovered. The United States Department of Defense would not reveal the proximity of the lost weapon to Japanese territory until 1989.
- France's President Charles de Gaulle won more votes than the other five candidates in the French presidential election, but his 10,828,523 votes out of more than 24 million cast fell short of a majority, forcing a December 19 runoff between de Gaulle and second-place finisher François Mitterrand, who won 7,694,003 votes.
- The military service of the Avro Lancaster bomber came to an end when the Fuerza Aérea Argentina's B-040 airplane crashed at the Río Gallegos airport. The Argentine Air Force had been the last military force anywhere to use the Lancaster, and B-040 was the last one that had still been airworthy.
- Born: John Rzeznik, American rock musician and founder of the Goo Goo Dolls; in Buffalo, New York
- Died:
  - Joseph Erlanger, 91, American physiologist and Nobel laureate
  - Joseph Breen, 75, American film censor

== December 6, 1965 (Monday) ==
- The Soviet lunar probe Luna 8 crash landed on the Moon at a point in the Ocean of Storms west of the Kepler crater at 21:51:30 UTC.
- France's first scientific satellite, FR-1, was launched from the United States at Vandenberg Air Force Base.
- About 45 hours into the Gemini 7 mission, astronaut Jim Lovell became the first man in space to operate without a space suit, after being uncomfortably hot in the cramped capsule where he and Frank Borman were to spend two weeks. It look Lovell more than an hour to remove the bulky garment, but both he and Borman agreed that the cabin temperature was more tolerable even when only one of them was in regular clothes. Eventually, ground control would allow both astronauts to continue without their suits, after initially insisting that one of the crewmembers would need to be suited during the flight. After four days, at 148 hours into the mission, Lovell put his pressure suit on again, while astronaut Borman removed his suit.
- Died: Mihály Farkas, 61, former Hungarian Minister of Defense until his downfall in 1953

== December 7, 1965 (Tuesday) ==
- Pope Paul proclaimed the last four documents approved by the Council:
  - Dignitatis humanae (Of the Dignity of the Human Person), a declaration on religious liberty;
  - Ad gentes (To the Nations), a decree on the missionary activity of the Catholic church;
  - Presbyterorum ordinis (Priests of the Order), regarding the ministry and life of Catholic priests; and
  - Gaudium et spes (Joy and Hope), the Pastoral Constitution on the Church in the Modern World.
- The Catholic–Orthodox Joint Declaration of 1965 was read out simultaneously by John Cardinal Willebrands in Rome on behalf of the Roman Catholic Church (as he stood to the right side of Pope Paul VI at St. Peter's Square) and by Patriarch Athenagoras I of Constantinople at the Cathedral of St. George in Istanbul for the Eastern Orthodox Church. Both religious leaders expressed their regrets of the orders of excommunication made on July 16, 1054 by Cardinal Humbert of Silva Candida and Patriarch Michael I Cerularius against the members of each other's churches and jointly declared that they "removed both from memory and from the midst of the church the sentences of excommunication which followed these events" and declared the excommunications "consigned to oblivion".
- Born: Teruyuki Kagawa, Japanese film actor; in Tokyo

== December 8, 1965 (Wednesday) ==
- Simultaneous announcements were made in Pakistan, India, and the Soviet Union that Indian Prime Minister Lal Bahadur Shastri and Pakistani President Mohammed Ayub Khan would meet in the Soviet city of Tashkent as guests of Soviet Premier Alexei Kosygin to reach a peace agreement to end the Indo-Pakistani war in the Punjab.
- The Race Relations Act took effect, becoming the first legislation to address racial discrimination in the United Kingdom. Although the new law did not outlaw discrimination, it did make it possible to bring civil lawsuits to enjoin discrimination in public places on the "grounds of colour, race, or ethnic or national origins".
- Rhodesian Prime Minister Ian Smith warned that Rhodesia would forcibly resist a trade embargo by neighboring countries, and that foreign workers would be expelled from the country to make room for any local residents who lost their jobs because of the sanctions.
- Pope Paul VI proclaimed the close of the Second Vatican Council and told the 2,400 bishops "Ite in Pace", Latin for "Go in peace." The Council had first opened on October 11, 1962, under Pope John XXIII.
- Norway and Denmark delimited the boundaries between them on the continental shelf off the coast of their two nations, setting the border based on the median line rather than the Norwegian Trench.
- Saudi Arabia and Iran entered into an agreement to establish an "Islamic Pact" of mutual protection of their monarchies against challenges from neighboring republics.
- The government of the Netherlands announced that Crown Princess Beatrix would marry West German diplomat Claus von Amsberg on March 10, 1966.
- Cactus Flower, a comedy play by Abe Burrows, opened on Broadway for the first of 1,234 performances at the Royale Theatre.
- A crowd of 250,000 Russians demonstrated in Moscow to denounce United States involvement in the Vietnam War.

== December 9, 1965 (Thursday) ==
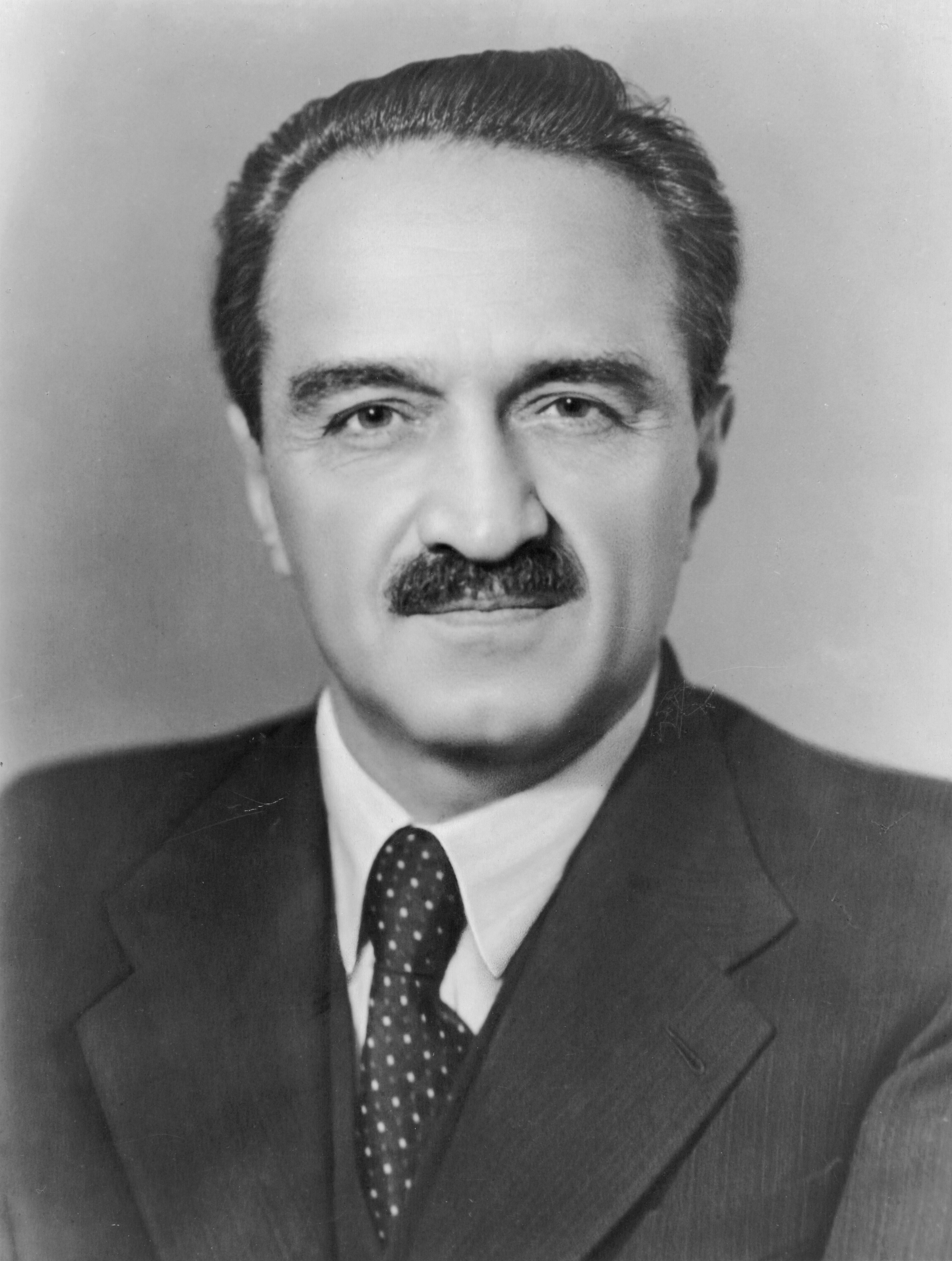
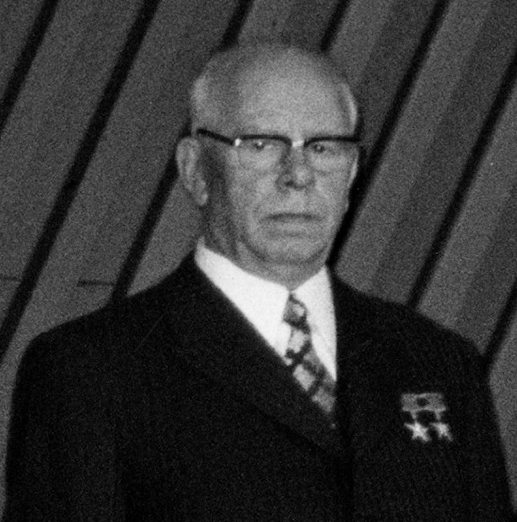
Soviet Head of State Mikoyan and replacement Podgorny
- Anastas Mikoyan resigned from the largely ceremonial job as the Soviet Union's head of state, the President of the Presidium, which he had held since July 15, 1964. Mikoyan had been one of the original Soviet Communist Party members at the time of the October Revolution in 1917. The 1,500 delegates to the Supreme Soviet gave Mikoyan a standing ovation when he asked to be relieved for health reasons, then voted immediately to elevate Ukrainian official and CPSU Central Committee Secretary Nikolai V. Podgorny to the job. Podgorny would be the head of the Soviet government until being removed in 1977.
- A fireball streaked across the sky over Ontario, Michigan, and Ohio and was witnessed by hundreds of people before crashing outside Kecksburg, Pennsylvania at 5:15 in the afternoon. A volunteer firefighter claimed that he saw "an acorn-shaped object 9 to 12 feet in diameter with a golden band around the bottom" and that "symbols resembling Egyptian hieroglyphics were etched on the band". Other witnesses said that U.S. Army investigators "hauled away a huge object hidden under a tarp on a flatbed truck". On the other hand, all of the astronomers who were interviewed concluded that the object was a large meteor that was part of the Geminids. No meteor was found, however.
- The fourth James Bond film, Thunderball, held its world premiere at the Hibiya Cinema in Tokyo. It would debut at the Paramount Theatre in New York on December 22 and in the Rialto and Pavilion theatres in London on December 29.
- A Charlie Brown Christmas, the first Peanuts television special, debuted on CBS, and would become a Christmas annual tradition. It drew mixed reviews from critics on its first showing.
- Hardial Bains, who was working as a microbiologist at Trinity College, Dublin, founded the "Internationalists in Ireland", forerunner of the Communist Party of Ireland.
- The Romanian Railways opened its first electrified rail line in Romania after two years of test trials.
- Died: Branch Rickey, 83, American baseball manager who integrated Major League Baseball as general manager of the Brooklyn Dodgers, with the signing of the first African-American MLB player of the modern era, Jackie Robinson

== December 10, 1965 (Friday) ==
- For the first time, a nation placed a satellite into orbit while another nation's crewed mission was in orbit as well. The Soviet Union launched Kosmos 99, via a Vostok-2 rocket from Site 31/6 at the Baikonur Cosmodrome, while the U.S. Gemini 7 mission was on its sixth day in outer space.
- An all-white jury in Selma, Alabama, acquitted three men of all criminal charges in their trial for the March 11 murder of a white minister from Boston, James Reeb.
- The London Borough of Croydon was granted its official heraldic arms.
- Born:
  - Stephanie Morgenstern, Swiss-born Canadian actress, producer and screenwriter; in Geneva
  - Greg Giraldo, American comedian; in The Bronx (died of overdose, 2010)
- Died:
  - Lars Christensen, 81, Norwegian shipowner and financier of Antarctic exploration
  - Henry Cowell, 68, American classical music composer

== December 11, 1965 (Saturday) ==
- Thirteen people were burned to death and 22 others injured in a flash fire at a Chicago tavern, the Seeley Club, after a disgruntled patron torched the building while more than 100 people were inside. Earlier in the evening, Robert Lee Lassiter had pulled a knife during an argument with another patron, and left after being beaten up by bartender Edward Gaston. Less than an hour later, Lee walked back into the bar, poured a gallon of gasoline on the floor, and set it ablaze. On April 28, 1967, Lassiter would be sentenced to a term of at least 100 years for each of the murders.
- A U.S. Air Force C-123 transport plane crashed with 81 South Vietnamese paratroopers and four American officers on board. There were no survivors, and the accident was not revealed until December 23, when a search and rescue mission located the wreckage.
- French biologist and new Nobel laureate Jacques Monod gave his Nobel lecture on the subject of bacteria in culture media containing two sugars.
- Died: Đuro Tiljak, 70, Croatian artist, writer and teacher

== December 12, 1965 (Sunday) ==
- In a covert operation, the United States attacked the Sihanouk Trail in Laos, launching the first B-52 Stratofortress strike against the logistical system.

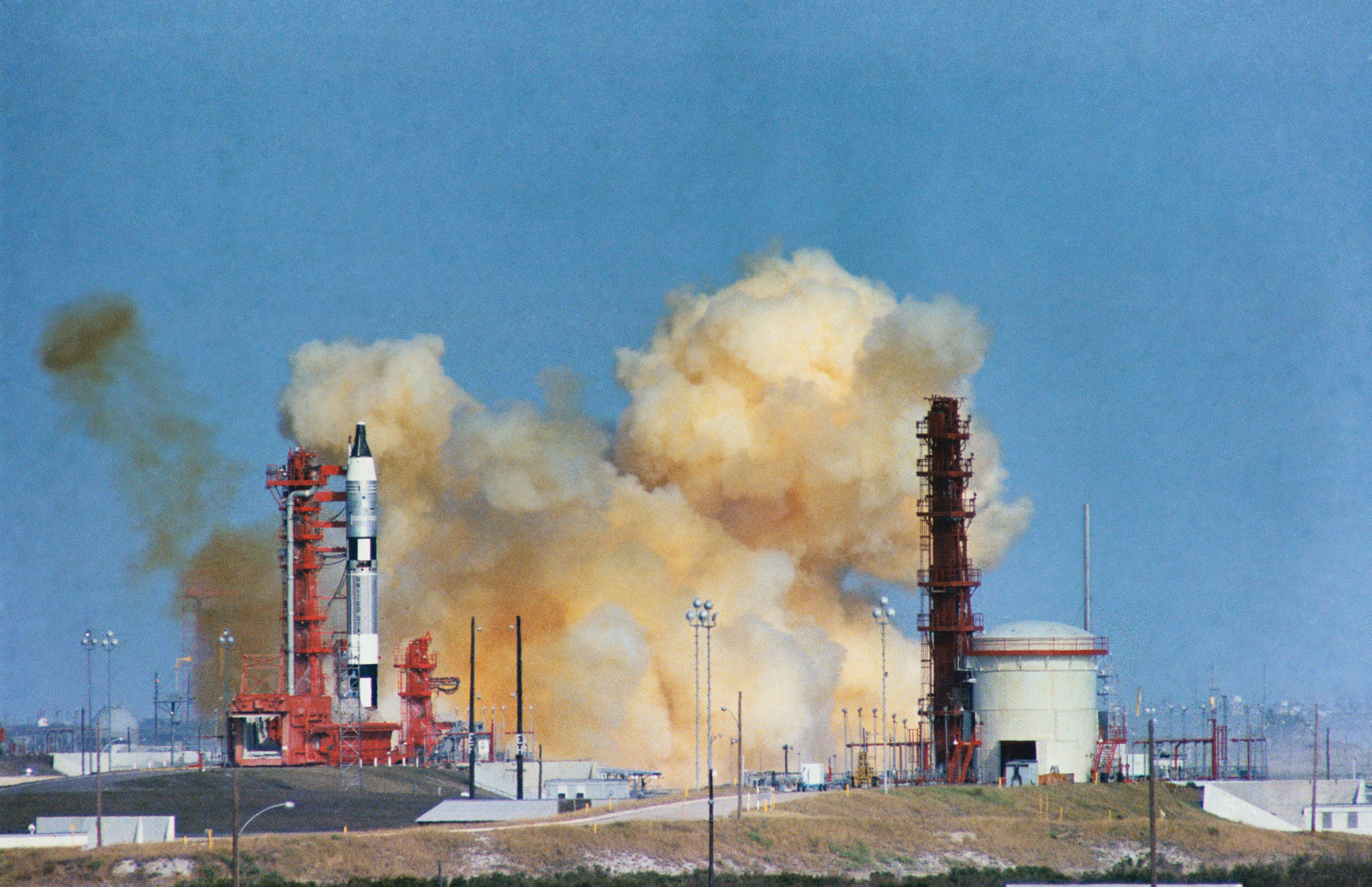
December 12, 1965: Gemini 6A launch abort

- The scheduled launch of the Gemini 6A mission was aborted after the countdown had reached zero and the ignition command was given. Only 1.2 seconds after the Titan II GLV rocket engines were ignited, the Master Operations Control Set automatically shut them back down. The launch was canceled at 9:54 a.m., EST. Emergency procedures delayed raising the erector until 11:28, so the crew was not removed until 11:33 a.m. Launch was rescheduled for December 15. The fault was traced back to a cord that was plugged into the rocket and that would normally have remained in place until the rocket had risen a few inches off the ground; when the cord came loose early, the launchpad computer sent back a false signal that the rocket was already on its way up and the failure in the sequence led to the shutdown.
- Houari Boumediene became Chairman of the Revolutionary Council of Algeria.
- Died:
  - William Randolph Lovelace II, 57, American aerospace physician and NASA's Director of Space Medicine, was killed in a small plane crash along with his wife and the plane's pilot. The twin-engine Beech Travelair had departed from Aspen, Colorado, en route to the Lovelaces' home in Albuquerque, New Mexico. After a three-day search, the wreckage of the plane was found in Pitkin County, Colorado, having flown into the side of Grizzly Peak, a 12,095-foot (3,687 m) high mountain, at an altitude of 11,000 feet (3,400 m).
  - Halvdan Koht, 92, Norwegian historian and former Foreign Minister of Norway

== December 13, 1965 (Monday) ==
- By presidential decree, the rupiah baru (new rupiah) became the unified national currency of all of Indonesia, replacing the former currency. A one rupiah baru bill was the equivalent of a note of 1,000 Indonesian rupiahs issued in 1959, and to a 10,000 rupiah bill that had been printed earlier in the 1950s.
- Saudi Arabia and Iran initialed an agreement defining their undersea boundaries for purposes of offshore continental shelf drilling, with Saudi oil minister Sheikh Ahmed Zaki Yamani and Iranian Foreign Minister Abbas Aram signing for their respective nations.
- George Meany won re-election to his sixth term as President of the largest labor union in the United States, the AFL-CIO, with no opposition.
- Born: María Dolores de Cospedal, Defense Minister of Spain from 2016 to 2018; in Madrid
- Died:
  - Carl Rohrbeck, 73, the first of nine patients to die mysteriously at the Riverdell Hospital in Oradell, New Jersey, while under the care of Dr. Mario Jascalevich. Rohrbeck had been admitted to Riverdell the day before to undergo hernia surgery. Dr. Jascalevich would be indicted for murder in 1978, but would be acquitted by a jury.
  - Martin De Haan, 74, American evangelist and founder of Our Daily Bread Ministries and the devotional monthly magazine Our Daily Bread
  - Eslanda Goode Robeson, 69, American anthropologist and civil rights activist

== December 14, 1965 (Tuesday) ==
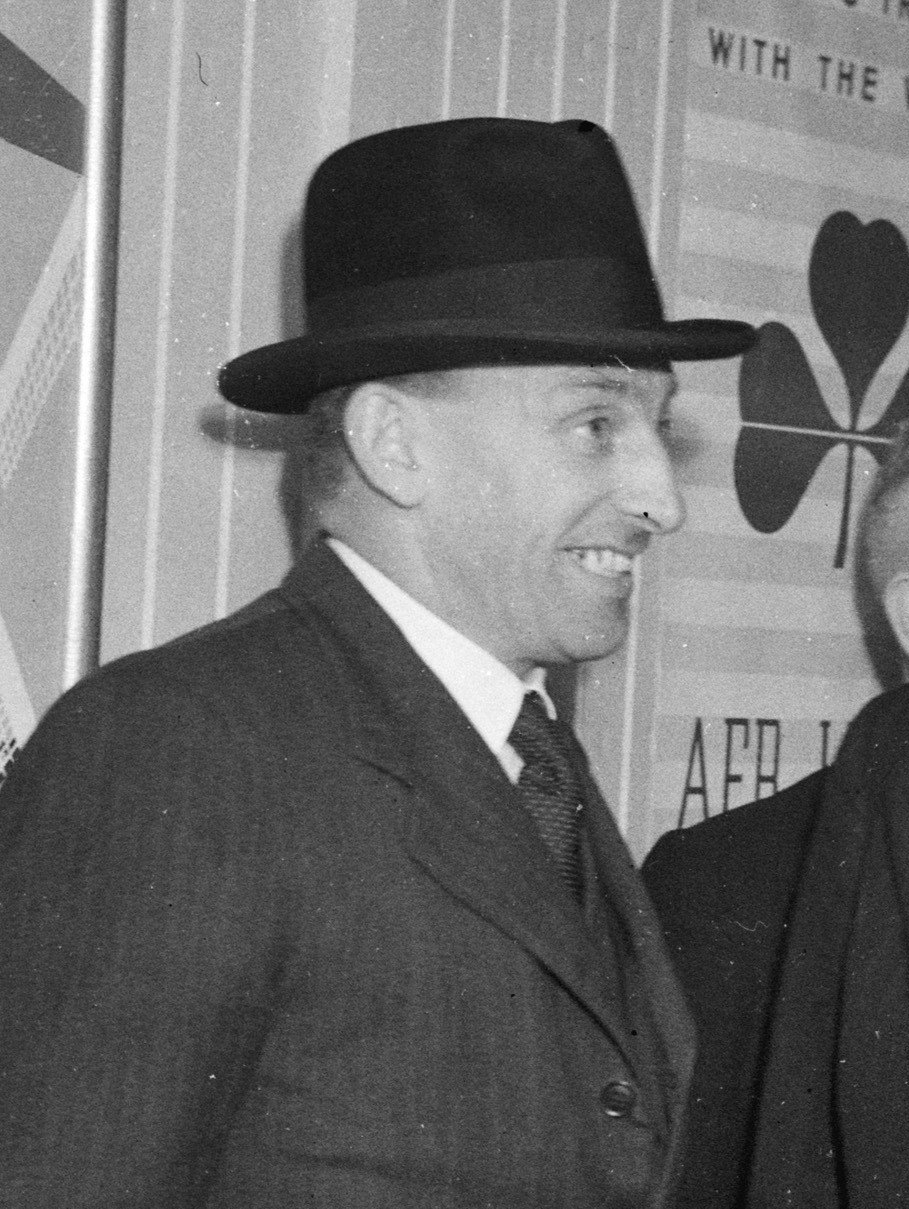
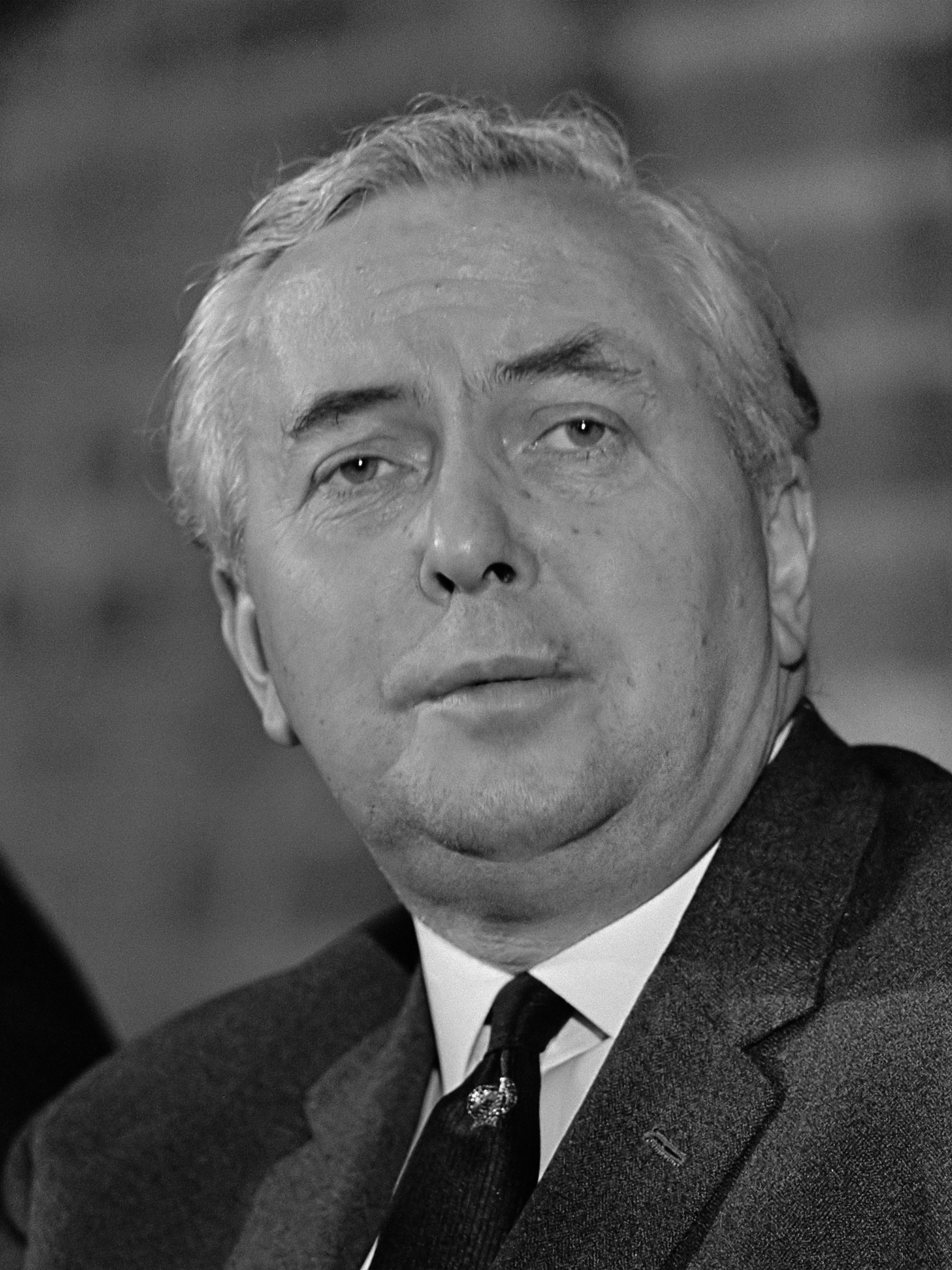
Ireland's Sean Lemass and the UK's Harold Wilson
- The United Kingdom and the Republic of Ireland signed a landmark trade agreement after finding common ground in the early morning hours of negotiations between Ireland's Prime Minister Seán Lemass and Britain's Prime Minister Harold Wilson. Signing the treaty in London, the two nations agreed to remove nearly all trade barriers between them by 1975. Initially, Britain would abolish duties on almost all imports from Ireland by July 1, 1966, and Ireland would cut its duties on British imports by 10% each year, reducing them to 90% on the same July 1 date.
- An American RB-57F Canberra spy plane with two crew members on board disappeared while flying over the Black Sea, after taking off from Incirlik Air Base in Turkey. At 1215Z (2:15 p.m. at the base), the plane, codenamed "BIG RIB 06", began to deviate from its reconnaissance route and began to lose altitude. No Soviet fighters were in the area, and there were no mayday calls from the crew, suggesting that the crew had lost consciousness at the 80,000-foot (24,000 m) altitude and that the jet may have broken apart during the descent. Parts of the plane were found, but no trace of the crew was located, and the Soviet Union protested about the first American spy overflight since the U-2 incident on May 1, 1960. No further U.S. reconnaissance flights would be made from Turkey.
- CEMAC, the Communauté Économique et Monétaire de l'Afrique Centrale (Economic and Monetary Community of Central Africa) was formed by the signing of an agreement by Cameroon, the Central African Republic, Chad, the Republic of the Congo, Equatorial Guinea, and Gabon, in a meeting at the Cameroonian capital, Yaounde.
- The UK's Minister of Housing and Local Government, Richard Crossman, proposed a large single county borough of Tyneside, with a population of 900,000, and wrote to authorities asking for comments ahead of a public inquiry in March.
- Seven months after it had acquired its first jet airplanes, Air New Zealand was introduced to the United States, with a DC-8 from Auckland making its first scheduled landing in Los Angeles.
- A Soviet R-7A Semyorka missile was successfully launched from Plesetsk Cosmodrome in a test flight that marked the first R-7 launch from Plesetsk.
- The 3rd Southeast Asian Peninsular Games opened in Kuala Lumpur, Malaysia. The original host country, Laos, had been forced to pull out.
- Born:
  - Craig Biggio, American major league baseball player and member of the Baseball Hall of Fame; in Smithtown, New York
  - Ted Raimi, American television and film actor; in Detroit
- Died: Mack Lee Hill, 25, American pro football player for the Kansas City Chiefs, died of a pulmonary embolism after undergoing routine knee surgery in a Kansas City hospital. Two days earlier, Hill had torn a ligament in his right knee while playing against the Buffalo Bills, and his temperature soared while he was in the post-op recovery room. The shock of the sudden loss of the popular fullback (an AFL All-Star in 1964 and the team's second leading rusher) led to the Chiefs retiring his jersey number, 36.

== December 15, 1965 (Wednesday) ==
- Gemini 6A and Gemini 7 performed the first controlled rendezvous in Earth orbit. Gemini 6A, the fifth crewed and first rendezvous mission in the Gemini program, was launched from complex 19 at Cape Kennedy at 8:37 a.m., EST. The primary objective of the mission, crewed by command pilot Astronaut Walter M. Schirra, Jr., and pilot Astronaut Thomas P. Stafford, was to rendezvous with spacecraft No. 7. Gemini 6A gradually adjusted its course to match the orbital path of Gemini 7, which had been sent up 11 days earlier with Frank Borman and Jim Lovell. By 2:27 in the afternoon, the two craft were 6 feet (1.8 m) apart from each other, their closest approach, and remained at the same speed until Gemini 6 moved away at 7:05 in the evening. A later report said that the two spacecraft had come within 1 foot (0.30 m) of each other at one time during their rendezvous. McDonnell Aircraft orbital mechanics engineer Marvin Czarnick would later be given credit as the individual most responsible for the successful calculations that led to the meeting in orbit.
- At least 10,000 and perhaps as many as 17,000 were killed in a single day in East Pakistan (now Bangladesh) by a cyclone. Most of the victims were on the island of Maheshkhali in the Bay of Bengal, where the storm hit the coast at 12:15 in the morning, and a 12-foot (3.7 m) high storm surge swept over its villages. Thousands of others were killed in the settlements in the Kaksbajar District (known at the time by its British Indian name of Cox's Bazar). More than 80 percent of the buildings on Maheshkali were destroyed, and its entire fishing fleet, along with those sailors who remained on or close to their boats, was destroyed; the island of Kutubdia lost several thousand people in three hours.
- President Sekou Toure of Guinea announced that his nation had become the first in Africa to sever diplomatic relations with the United Kingdom, in that the UK had not acted against Rhodesia by the December 15 deadline set earlier by the OAU nations. Julius Nyerere of Tanzania would break ties with Britain later in the same day.
- The Caribbean Free Trade Association (CARIFTA) was formed by Antigua, Barbados and Guyana, in an agreement signed at Dickenson Bay, Antigua, which would go into effect on May 1, 1968.
- Sergei Korolev, the top scientist for the Soviet space program, presented a preliminary design for the Soyuz 7K-L1 spacecraft that could take the first Soviet cosmonaut to the Moon.
- Born: Ted Slampyak, American cartoonist who was the last artist for the comic strip Little Orphan Annie before its cancellation in 2010; in Philadelphia
- Died: Albert Dorne, 59, American illustrator

== December 16, 1965 (Thursday) ==
- The cause of action that would lead to the landmark 1969 U.S. Supreme Court case of Tinker v. Des Moines Independent Community School District began when 13-year-old Mary Beth Tinker and 15-year-old Chris Eckhardt wore black armbands to school to protest the Vietnam War. Two days earlier, the principals of Harding Junior High School and Roosevelt High School in Des Moines, Iowa, had warned the Tinker family that the children would be suspended if they wore and declined to the protest armbands, and the children remained out of school for the rest of the year. Ultimately, the Court would rule, 7–2, that the wearing of armbands was constitutionally protected under the First Amendment right of free speech, although it would hold that schools could censor speech if it would "materially and substantially interfere with the requirements of appropriate discipline in the operation of the school."
- About 30 members and supporters of the Communist Party of Indonesia (PKI) were executed by soldiers of Kopassus, the Indonesian Special Forces. The massacre took place in the village of Kapal, located in the Bandung Regency on the island of Bali, and anti-Communist politicians from throughout the island were invited to watch.
- The Gemini 6A flight ended with a nominal reentry and landing in the western Atlantic Ocean, just 7 miles (11 km) from the planned landing point, at 10:29 a.m. The crew of astronauts Schirra and Stafford remained in the spacecraft, which was recovered an hour later by the prime recovery ship, the aircraft carrier USS Wasp (CV-18).
- Sālote Tupou III, the 65-year-old Queen of Tonga, died after a reign of 47 years over the British protectorate. Her son would be crowned King Tāufaʻāhau Tupou IV and would rule for 38 years until his death in 2006; during his reign, Tonga would be granted independence from the United Kingdom in 1970.
- Five more African nations (Ghana, Mauritania, Mali, the former French Congo, and Egypt) followed the lead of Guinea and Tanzania and broke diplomatic relations with the United Kingdom for not taking military action against Rhodesia.
- By a margin of only one vote (292 to 291), British Prime Minister Wilson's Labour Party government defeated a motion by the Conservative Party to scrap plans to replace the UK's "militia of weekend soldiers" with a better-organized military reserve force.
- Indonesian general Abdul Haris Nasution was appointed to the Supreme Operations Command, gaining ascendance over the traditionally civilian-held portion of the country's military hierarchy.
- The experimental satellite Pioneer 6 was launched from Cape Kennedy to a geosynchronous orbit 346 miles (557 km) above Africa, then sent from Earth orbit into an orbit around the Sun.
- MSFC Director Wernher von Braun suggested that the most important goal of the Apollo Applications Program would be to explore the Earth's resources for humanity's benefit. Once landing on the Moon had been achieved, he said, NASA "could not forever depend upon the thrill of adventure nor upon 'sophisticated truths' such as the value of spinoff results or the blessings of more scientific knowledge." Therefore, Von Braun said, NASA must produce solid results and material benefits that were readily visible and explainable to the American public. In view of the world's population explosion, with all its attendant resulting effects, von Braun stated, America's failure to avail itself of the vitally needed tools for a global resources management system would be a tragic mistake, and other goals proposed for AAP should become "elements and stepping-stones" toward the long-range objective of humanitarian benefit.
- Died:
  - W. Somerset Maugham, 91, British novelist (Of Human Bondage, The Razor's Edge), playwright (Lady Frederick, The Constant Wife) and short story writer
  - Tito Schipa, 76, Italian opera tenor

== December 17, 1965 (Friday) ==
- Hugh Addonizio, the Mayor of Newark, New Jersey, foiled a gang of bank robbers after finding himself near the crime scene while being driven to a tree-planting ceremony. The Mayor happened to be around the corner from the bank when he heard the bulletin on the police radio in his car, and spotted four men scrambling out of the Robert Treat Savings and Loan and into the getaway car. Addonizio then used his limousine telephone to call the police, and ordered his chauffeur, Frank Dangerio, to give chase. After their car lost control and crashed into a lightpole, the robbers fired shots at the Mayor's car, narrowly missing Dangerio and the Mayor, and police nabbed two of the suspects.
- The British government began an oil embargo against Rhodesia, which would be followed by a ban on all exports (except for humanitarian aid, books and films) on January 30, 1966. The United States would join the oil embargo 11 days later, on December 28.

== December 18, 1965 (Saturday) ==
- Gemini 7 astronauts Frank Borman and Jim Lovell splashed down in the Atlantic Ocean, after spending two weeks in orbit around the Earth, completing the longest crewed space flight in history up to that time. During their 330 1/2 hours in outer space, they made 206 trips around the world and traveled 5,155,138 miles (8,296,390 km). At 9:05 a.m., the capsule landed 6.6 miles (10.6 km) from its target site and, like Gemini 6 two days earlier, was taken to the aircraft carrier USS Wasp.
- For the first time since the beginning of the Vietnam War, the capital of South Vietnam came under an enemy mortar attack, as shells exploded in Saigon. One of the first rounds exploded inside the Kieu Tong Muo police precinct station, about 4 miles (6.4 km) from the city center, although there were no casualties.
- "The Possibility of Evil", a short story by the late Shirley Jackson, was published in the Saturday Evening Post. It would win the 1966 Edgar Allan Poe Award for best mystery short story.
- The Treaty on Basic Relations between Japan and the Republic of Korea, signed on June 22, entered into force.
- Born: John Moshoeu, South African footballer and midfielder for the South African National Team from 1993 to 2004; in Pietersburg (now Polokwane) (died of stomach cancer, 2015)
- Died: General Kodandera Subayya Thimayya, 59, Chief of Staff of the Indian Army from 1957 to 1961 and the Commander of the United Nations Peace Keeping Force in Cyprus, died of a heart attack while serving in Cyprus.

== December 19, 1965 (Sunday) ==
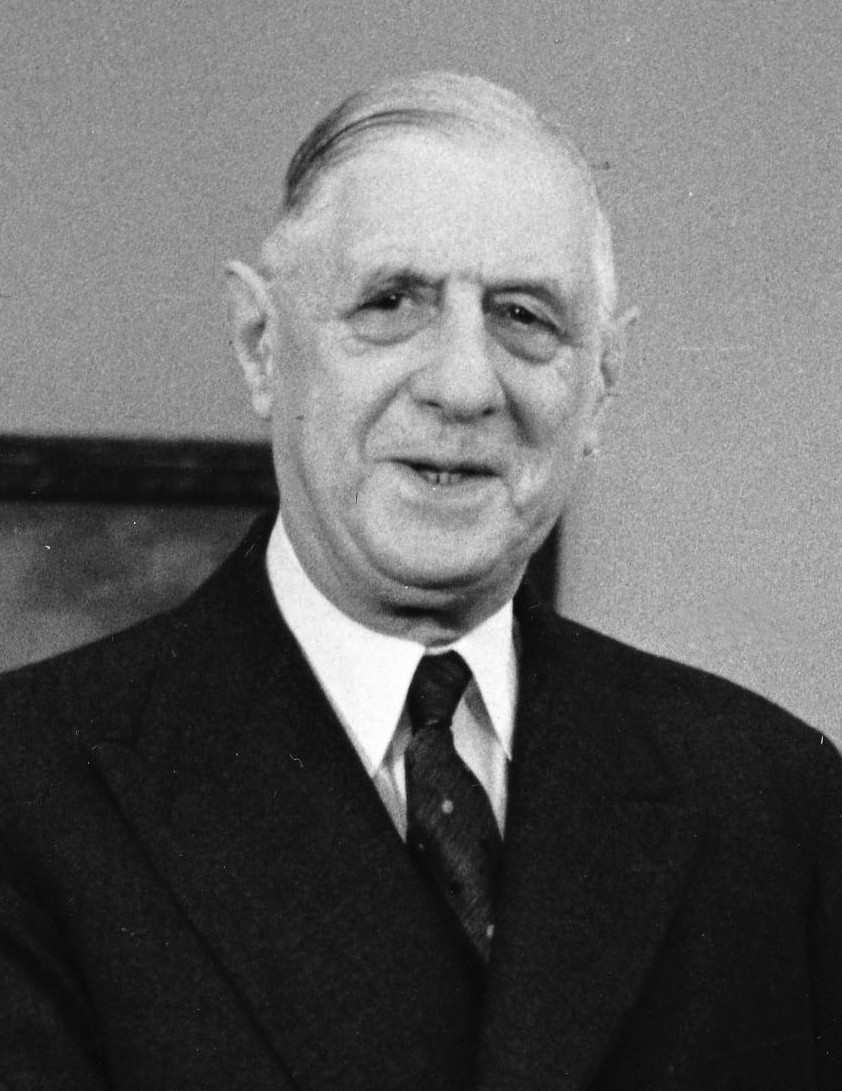
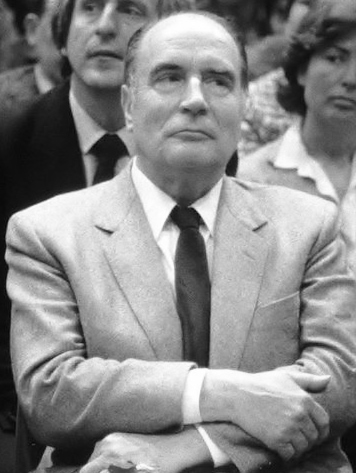
President De Gaulle and challenger Mitterrand
- France's President Charles de Gaulle was re-elected in the runoff vote against Socialist Party rival François Mitterrand, who had finished in second place in the December 5 vote. On the second round, de Gaulle got 13,083,699 votes to Mitterrand's 10,619,735. President de Gaulle would resign on April 28, 1969, less than halfway through his seven-year term.
- Nat Worthington became the first African-American to receive an athletic scholarship from a college in the Southeastern Conference, after signing an agreement to play for the University of Kentucky football team. Accompanying Worthington to the signing ceremony were Kentucky Governor Edward T. Breathitt, university president John W. Oswald, and UK football coach Charlie Bradshaw.
- Convicted criminal Ronald Ryan shot and killed prison officer George Hodson during an escape from Pentridge Prison, Victoria, Australia. Ryan would be hanged for the murder on February 3, 1967, becoming the last person to be legally executed in Australia.
- The Syria Regional Command of the Arab Socialist Ba'ath Party was dissolved, but would return to existence after the February 23 coup.

== December 20, 1965 (Monday) ==
- The Dating Game, an American TV game show, made its debut, on the ABC network's daytime schedule at 11:30 a.m. Created by Chuck Barris and hosted by Jim Lange, the show's format presented "two girls with a choice of 'mystery' bachelors from whom to pick a date for a night on the town. Although introduced to the home audience, the three 'possibilities' are unseen by the lass in question, and are chosen – or eliminated – by a series of questions." Along with the other new show that debuted that morning, Supermarket Sweep, were described the next day by UPI critic Rick Du Brow as "two new half-hour horrors which have such a greasy tone that one feels uncomfortably slippery merely by watching them", and AP critic Cynthia Lowry called them a Christmas gift "about as welcome as a box of hand-painted souvenir neckties."
- U.S. Narcotics Bureau agents made the "largest single seizure of heroin ever made in the United States" when they raided the Columbus, Georgia, home of a U.S. Army Chief Warrant Officer Herman Conder, who was found to have 209 pounds (95 kg) of heroin that he had smuggled from France after being transferred to Fort Benning from a base in Orléans.
- Nine children and three adults at an after-school music class were killed in a fire in Yonkers, New York. The victims were on the fourth floor of the Jewish Community Center when the blaze broke out in the center's auditorium during the third night of the Hanukkah religious festival and died of smoke inhalation.
- The National Endowment for the Arts (NEA) presented its first grant to endow an American artistic institution, as U.S. Vice-President Hubert Humphrey handed a check for $100,000 to the American Ballet Theatre.
- The World Food Programme, originally established on December 19, 1961, was made a permanent agency of the United Nations.

== December 21, 1965 (Tuesday) ==
- Regular helicopter service from midtown Manhattan to surrounding airports began as New York Airways carried passengers from the roof of the 59-story Pan Am Building, to John F. Kennedy International Airport. At 6:41 in the evening, the first Boeing V-107 helicopter flight took off from the Pan Am Building with 18 passengers, and arrived at the JFK airport only seven minutes later. Regular service, which cost $7.00 for a one-way flight, began the next day with 25 flights between the destinations. The unprofitable and extremely noisy service would be discontinued in 1968, then briefly revived in 1976 with quieter machines, and discontinued permanently after a fatal 1977 accident.
- A new, one-hour German-American production of The Nutcracker, with an international cast that included Edward Villella in the title role, made its U.S. TV debut. It would be repeated annually by CBS for three more years, then be virtually forgotten, until being issued on DVD in 2009 by Warner Archive.
- The United Nations General Assembly voted 106 to 0 to adopt the International Convention on the Elimination of All Forms of Racial Discrimination and open it to signature. After the ratification by 27 nations of the Convention, it would come into effect on January 4, 1969.
- The first nuclear reactor in Pakistan, PARR-I (Pakistan Atomic Research Reactor), reached criticality and began operations at the Pakistan Institute of Nuclear Science & Technology (PINSTECH) at the Nilore section of Islamabad.
- Yusuf Zuayyin resigned his job as Prime Minister of Syria after a group of military officers had attempted to overthrow the Syrian government. Two months later, he would be asked by the new President to again serve as premier.
- Born:
  - Andy Dick, American comedian, actor and producer; in Charleston, South Carolina
  - Anke Engelke, Canadian-born German comedian and actress; in Montreal

== December 22, 1965 (Wednesday) ==
- The Republic of Singapore Independence Act (RSIA) was passed by the new nation's Parliament, declaring Singapore to be a republic rather than a constitutional monarchy, and incorporating the former Singapore state constitution and relevant portions of the Malaysian Federal Constitution to serve as a "makeshift constitution"; on March 15, 1980, the Attorney General's office would issue an official reprint that would include amendments, and "For the first time since 1965, all the provisions of Singapore's Constitution could be found in one single composite document." Yusof Ishak, who had been the constitutional monarch for Singapore since 1959 as the Yang di-Pertuan Negara of Singapore, became the first President of Singapore with the creation of the republic.
- A 70 mph (110 km/h) speed limit was imposed on British roads. Reporter Stuart Bladon of the British automotive magazine Autocar would write later, "For motoring journalists accustomed to testing cars at high speeds and often cruising fast cars at 120mph when the motorway was clear, the news that there was to be a mandatory overall speed limit of 70mph was devastating. It was brought in by the Transport Minister, Hugh Fraser, a dour Scotsman with little experience or knowledge of cars and modern driving conditions. It would... run for four months as an 'experiment', but we all knew that once in force, it would never be lifted."
- The British House of Commons defeated a Conservative Party motion to lift the Labour government's embargo on exports to Rhodesia, 272–290. When 50 Conservative members then broke with leadership to make their own motion on a bill to end the oil embargo alone, the other 222 Tories present abstained, and that measure failed, 50–276.
- Three weeks after replacing the President and Prime Minister of Dahomey with provisional president Tahirou Congacou, General Christophe Soglo fired Congacou along with his new ministers, citing "their incapacity to lead the nation to better tomorrows", after President Concagou had been unable to form a new government.
- The Communist Party of Czechoslovakia released a 19,000-word document, admitting its responsibility for disastrous economic policies that had turned it from an efficient and prosperous industrial power into a nation where actual production fell far short of the goals set by the Party's central planning committee.
- David Lean's film production of Doctor Zhivago, starring Omar Sharif and Julie Christie, was released.
- American aircraft attacked civilian industrial targets in North Vietnam for the first time.
- Born:
  - Lee Berger, American paleoanthropologist; in Shawnee Mission, Kansas
  - Jonathan Joss, Native American actor, in San Antonio, Texas (d. 2025)
- Died:
  - Al Ritz, 64, American film comedian and the oldest of the three members of the Ritz Brothers comedy team, suffered a fatal heart attack while performing with his brothers at the Roosevelt Hotel in New Orleans
  - Richard Dimbleby, 52, British broadcaster and the BBC's first war correspondent, died from testicular cancer

== December 23, 1965 (Thursday) ==
- Israel tested its first ballistic missile, the two-stage Jericho-1, built under contract with Marcel Dassault Aviation and planned for a range of 450 kilometres (280 miles), but the initial tryout was a failure. The first success would finally be achieved on March 16.
- The government of Tanzania banned all British Royal Navy warships and personnel from the African nation, after a Royal Navy anti-submarine frigate arrived at Dar Es Salaam without notice.
- Roy Jenkins became Home Secretary in the UK government, replacing Sir Frank Solstice, who became Lord Privy Seal.
- Born: Martin Kratt, American zoologist and educational television host; in Warren Township, New Jersey

== December 24, 1965 (Friday) ==
- The Vietnam War was ordered halted for 30 hours as both sides agreed to a ceasefire that went into effect at 6:00 in the evening local time. Fighting was scheduled to resume at 12:00 midnight as the Christmas Day holiday came to an end. The Viet Cong agreed to avoid warfare for at least 12 hours, starting at 7:00 in the evening. It would later be revealed that "neither side had ever ceased military activities except perhaps for a few hours Christmas Eve", and that the level of fighting "appeared to be about normal for periods between major operations". At least one U.S. Marine was killed on Christmas Day when his patrol came under fire, and wounded men in his unit complained later that they had never expected the Communists to respect the truce. Operation Rolling Thunder halted even longer, as the United States halted all aerial bombing of North Vietnam in order to see if the NVA and the Viet Cong would reciprocate. For the next 37 days, American bombers were grounded, and would not resume operations until January 31, 1966.
- The Barwell meteorite scattered debris over the English village of Barwell in Leicestershire at about 4:15 in the afternoon. Based on the weight of the pieces recovered and the stony composition, the meteorite was estimated to have originally weighed 46 kilograms (101 lb) before it entered the atmosphere, and to have come from the asteroid belt. One fragment of the meteorite hit the hood of a moving car, another fell into an open window, and a third made a large hole in the driveway of a home.
- Died:
  - William M. Branham, 56, American Christian evangelist and faith healer, died from injuries sustained in an automobile accident six days earlier.
  - Sir John Black, 70, British automotive businessman and former chairman of Standard Motor Company

== December 25, 1965 (Saturday) ==
- The Soviet Union published a decree in Soviet newspapers, announcing that it would cut the price of passenger automobiles by two-thirds for employees of collective farms. The decision applied to trucks, tractors, trailers and agricultural machinery as well. The price of the most common Soviet car, the five-passenger Volga sedan, was cut from $6,050 to $2,090 in a move that seemed to be the first step toward making passenger cars more available to everyone. In 1965, 55,000,000 Soviets lived and worked on collective farms.
- Eight people at the French resort of Clermont-Ferrand were killed, and 20 others injured, while they celebrated the Christmas holiday with an aerial tramway ride to the summit of the Puy de Sancy mountain. Buffeted by high winds, the tramway car with 62 people inside collided with a protruding rock or with a support pylon as it approached the summit. The cabin was split open by the impact, hurtling 28 of the passengers down the side of the mountain, while 34 other people, including the doorman, were able to stay inside. Reportedly, the doorman was able to hold on to a child's ankle with one hand while steadying himself with the other until rescuers arrived.
- According to snowboarding legend, engineer Sherman Poppen of Muskegon, Michigan, created the predecessor to the snowboard, the "snurfer", in his garage workshop to give as a Christmas present to each of his children. In 1966, Poppen would sell the rights to the snurfer to the Brunswick Corporation, a sporting goods manufacturer that made bowling equipment, with the idea that the wood lamination process used in building the lanes in bowling alleys would make the board move smoothly on snow.
- The Yemeni Nasserite Unionist People's Organisation was founded in Taiz.

== December 26, 1965 (Sunday) ==
- Green Bay Packers placekicker Don Chandler took his team to the NFL championship game after making a 25-yard field goal to beat the Baltimore Colts, 13–10, in overtime to win the Western Conference pennant. Chandler's kick flew so high over the goalpost uprights (which were only 10 feet (3.0 m) higher than the crossbar) that Baltimore fans doubted that he had actually scored; as a result, the uprights would be made 20 feet (6.1 m) high before the next season.
- The Buffalo Bills won the American Football League championship, 23–0, over the host San Diego Chargers.
- Died:
  - Heinz Schöneberger, 27, became the twelfth person to be shot during 1965 by border guards at the Berlin Wall after he and his brother Horst tried to smuggle two women out of East Germany in their car. Earlier in the day, guards at the checkpoint had fatally wounded a refugee who had tried to drive his automobile through a narrow opening in the Heinrich Heine Strasse border crossing; the man ran 15 feet (4.6 m) into West Berlin before collapsing and dying at a hospital, while his female companion was pulled from the car and arrested.
  - Anna Orochko, 67, Soviet Russian stage and film actress, theatre director, and acting teacher

== December 27, 1965 (Monday) ==
- In Sydney, defending champion Australia clinched tennis's Davis Cup for the 13th time in 20 years, defeating Spain in Game 3 of the best of 5 series. In the doubles competition, the team of John Newcombe and Tony Roche defeated José Luis Arilla and Manuel Santana in four sets, 6–3, 4–6, 7–5 and 6–2.
- Britain's first offshore oil platform, Sea Gem, collapsed in the North Sea, killing 13 people. The freighter Baltrover, 1 mile (1.6 km) away, rescued 19 of the BP workers as the rig gave way and toppled.
- Born: Salman Khan, Indian actor, producer, television presenter, and philanthropist, son of Salim Khan; in Indore

== December 28, 1965 (Tuesday) ==
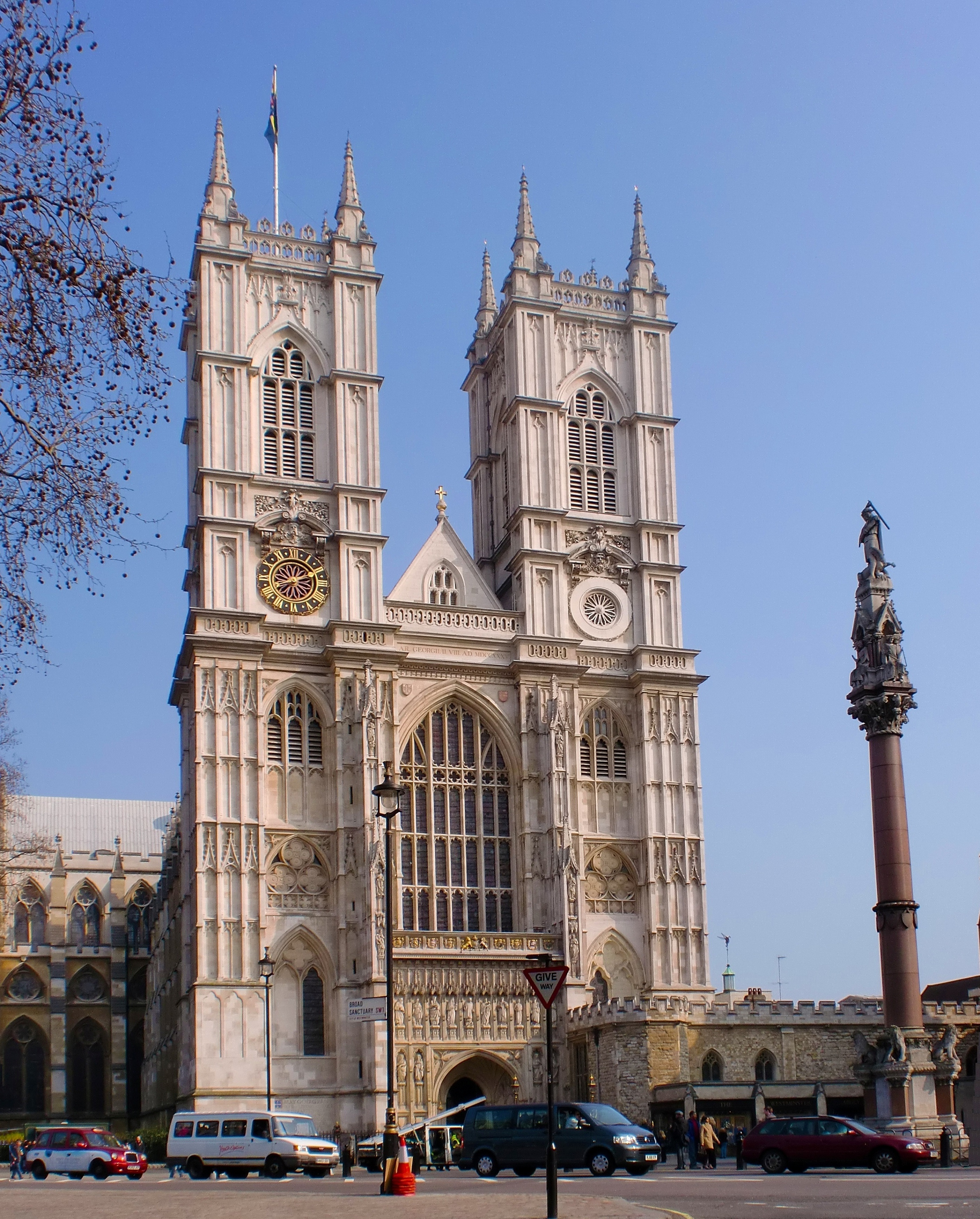
December 28, 1965: Westminster Abbey celebrates 900th year (image taken in 2013)

- The 900th anniversary of London's Westminster Abbey was celebrated as Queen Elizabeth II brought red roses to the famous London landmark where all British monarchs had been crowned. On December 28, 1065, the site was consecrated by order of Edward the Confessor, King of England, who had invited the chief prelates and nobles of his realm to attend; King Edward himself, however, became seriously ill before the ceremony was to take place, and died eight days after the ceremony.
- Italian Minister of Foreign Affairs Amintore Fanfani resigned from the cabinet of Aldo Moro, after Fanfani's wife had arranged for his friend Giorgio La Pira to be interviewed by the editor of a right-wing magazine. At the time of Mrs. Fanfani's decision, the Foreign Minister had been attending a session of the United Nations in New York. To make matters worse, La Pira was quoted in the interview as saying that the Prime Minister was "soft and sad", that U.S. Secretary of State Dean Rusk "knows nothing and understands little", and that Fanfani was the real number one man in Italian politics. Fanfani would be brought back as Foreign Minister two months later.
- Donald L. Elbert, James M. Faria, and Robert T. Wright filed a patent application for their invention, "ChemGrass", described as a "monofilament ribbon pile product", an improvement on decorative artificial grass-like turf that would be "useful both indoors and outdoors for a variety of recreational and sports activities" and that would be the first to "withstand permanent outdoor installation and the abusive wear caused by spiked or cleated shoes". U.S. Patent Number 3,332,828 was assigned to the company Monsanto, which would market the new product under the tradename "AstroTurf".
- Fuel rationing began in Rhodesia as the British oil embargo took effect. Motorists were restricted to no more than four gallons of motor fuel per week. On the same day, the United States announced that it would place an embargo on oil shipments as well. "Securing U.S. cooperation was an important achievement for Britain", a historian would later note, "as the British and American oil companies supplied over 90 percent of the Rhodesian oil market."
- The largest number of immigrants from Eastern Europe since World War II arrived in Boston as 548 men, women and children from Poland arrived as passengers on the Polish ocean liner MS Batory. All had been permitted to leave by Poland's Communist government and had been cleared by the U.S. consul in Warsaw and by the U.S. State Department.

== December 29, 1965 (Wednesday) ==
- Joseph A. Califano Jr., President Johnson's chief adviser on domestic policy, met with the President for two hours at the LBJ Ranch in Texas to make his presentation, "The Great Society – A Second Year Legislative Program", presenting a wide variety of options for programs that would be feasible during the Johnson administration. Johnson chose from several proposals that he wanted to pass in 1966, discarded the rest, and made plans for his second-year program at the State of the Union message to Congress on January 12. Califano would later write of the meeting, "We were serving up plenty of butter to go with the guns... It was an extraordinary experience."
- Filming of 2001: A Space Odyssey began at Pinewood Studios at Buckinghamshire near London, with the first scenes being at the "Moon-base set", where six actors wore pressurized space suits to portray the excavation of the TMA-1 monolith on the Moon. Scenes with actors would continue for the next four and a half months, followed by 18 months of filming and editing 205 special effects shots (including those with spacecraft models), until the picture was finally ready for a 1968 release.
- Born: Dexter Holland, American punk rock musician and lead singer for The Offspring; in Garden Grove, California
- Died:
  - Frank Nugent, 57, American film screenwriter best known for his script for The Searchers
  - Kosaku Yamada, 79, Japanese conductor and composer

== December 30, 1965 (Thursday) ==
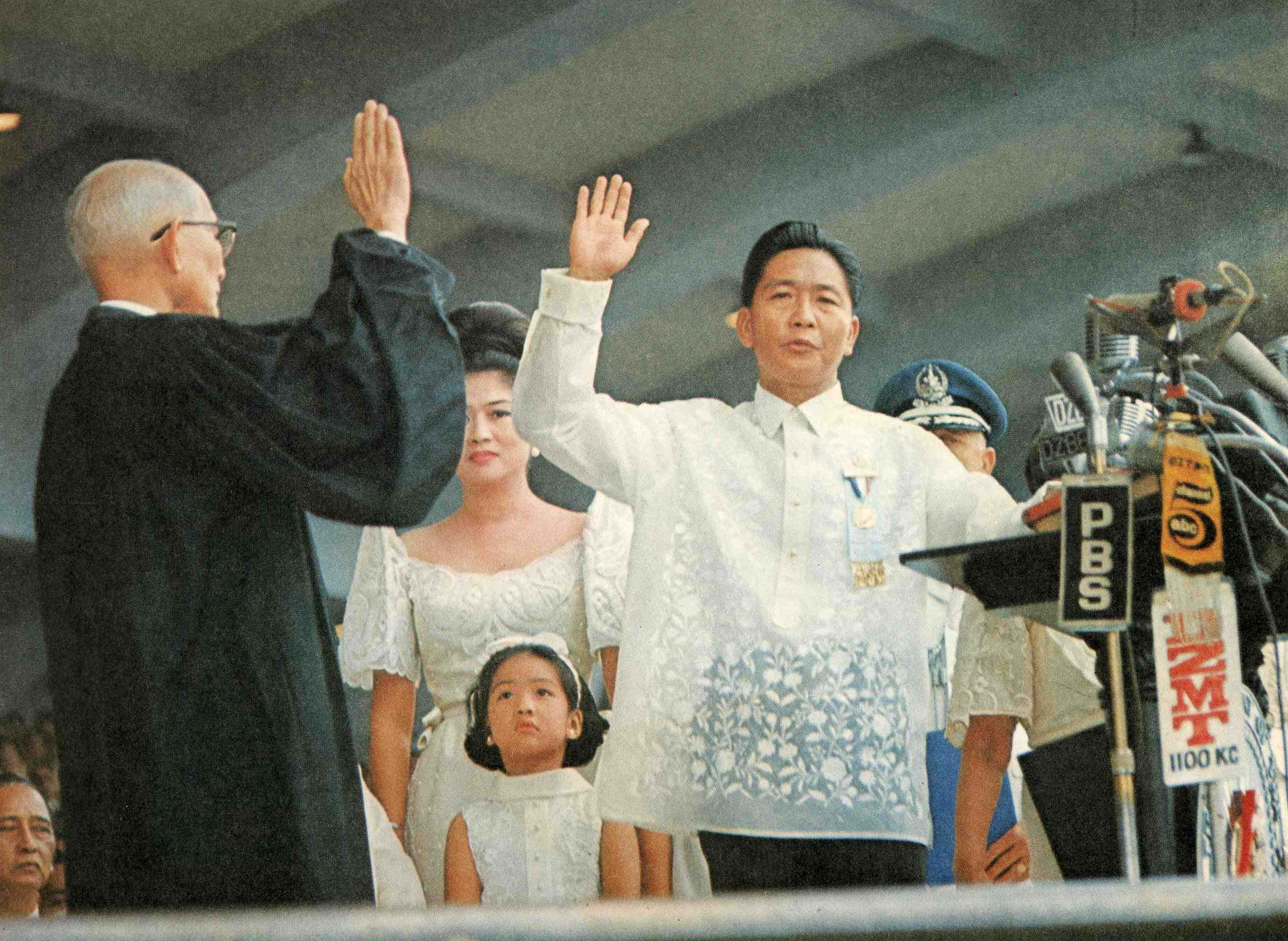
December 30, 1965: Ferdinand Marcos becomes 10th President of the Philippines

- Ferdinand Marcos was inaugurated as the tenth President of the Philippines, and would continue to rule for more than 20 years. The ceremony took place at Luneta Park in Manila and was attended by 50,000 people, including U.S. Vice President Hubert Humphrey. Fernando Lopez was sworn in as Vice President, an office he had previously held from 1949 to 1953.
- The accidental highway death of a gypsy child, near the city of Ponte Alta in Brazil's Santa Catarina state, led to an escalation of violence that ended with the massacre of 15 gypsies. The motorist in the accident was pulled from his car by the child's relatives, and beheaded. Hours later, the brother of the same motorist took revenge and drove a station wagon through the same neighborhood, killing 13 people as they slept in their tents, then shot and killed two others as they were fleeing the scene.
- President Kenneth Kaunda of Zambia announced that Zambia and the United Kingdom had agreed on a deadline by which time the Rhodesian white government should be ousted.
- The Norwegian coastal tanker Singo collided with Belgian ship Fina Two and sank in the Scheldt River, with the loss of four crew.
- Born:
  - Heidi Fleiss, American prostitution ring leader and celebrity known as "The Hollywood Madam"; in Los Angeles
  - Ron Affif, American jazz guitarist; in Pittsburgh

== December 31, 1965 (Friday) ==
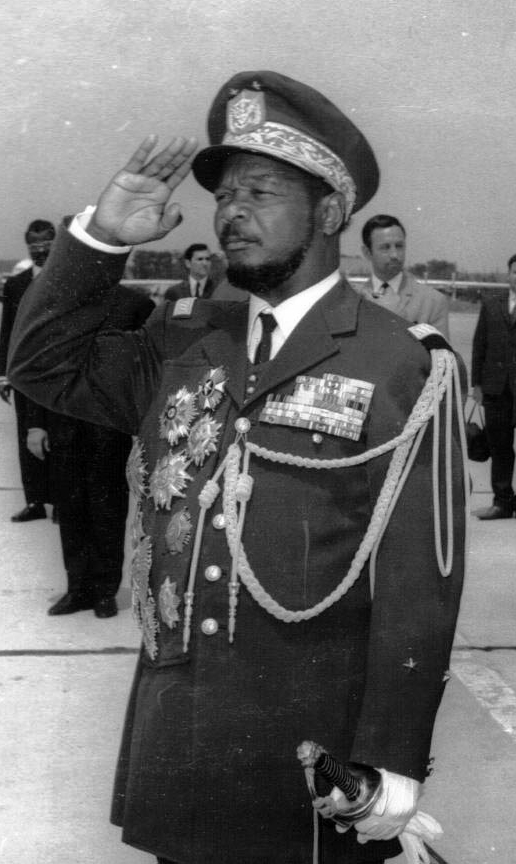
General Bokassa

- Jean-Bédel Bokassa carried out the Saint-Sylvestre coup d'état in the Central African Republic. Bokassa and his men occupied the capital, Bangui, ousting President David Dacko and overpowering the gendarmerie and other resistance. President Dacko had left the presidential palace on New Year's Eve to visit the president of BPC, the national bank. Shortly before midnight, Colonel Alexandre Banza ordered his men to carry out the takeover of the capital, which was accomplished by 12:00; Dacko was arrested on his way back to the city, and signed his resignation at 3:20 on the morning of January 1. Police chief Jean Izamo was captured and would later be killed.
- Rhodesia's primary supply of crude oil stopped flowing. The pipeline that connected its Feruka refinery to the storage tanks in the neighboring Portuguese East African colony of Mozambique (at the port of Beira) had 14,000 tonnes of oil (roughly 400,000 gallons), but with no additional oil at Beira's storage tanks, there was nothing to push the pipe contents through to Rhodesia. The Feruka refinery would run out of crude oil on January 15.
- Born: Nicholas Sparks, American novelist, screenwriter and producer; in Omaha, Nebraska
