= Zeeland, Michigan =

- City
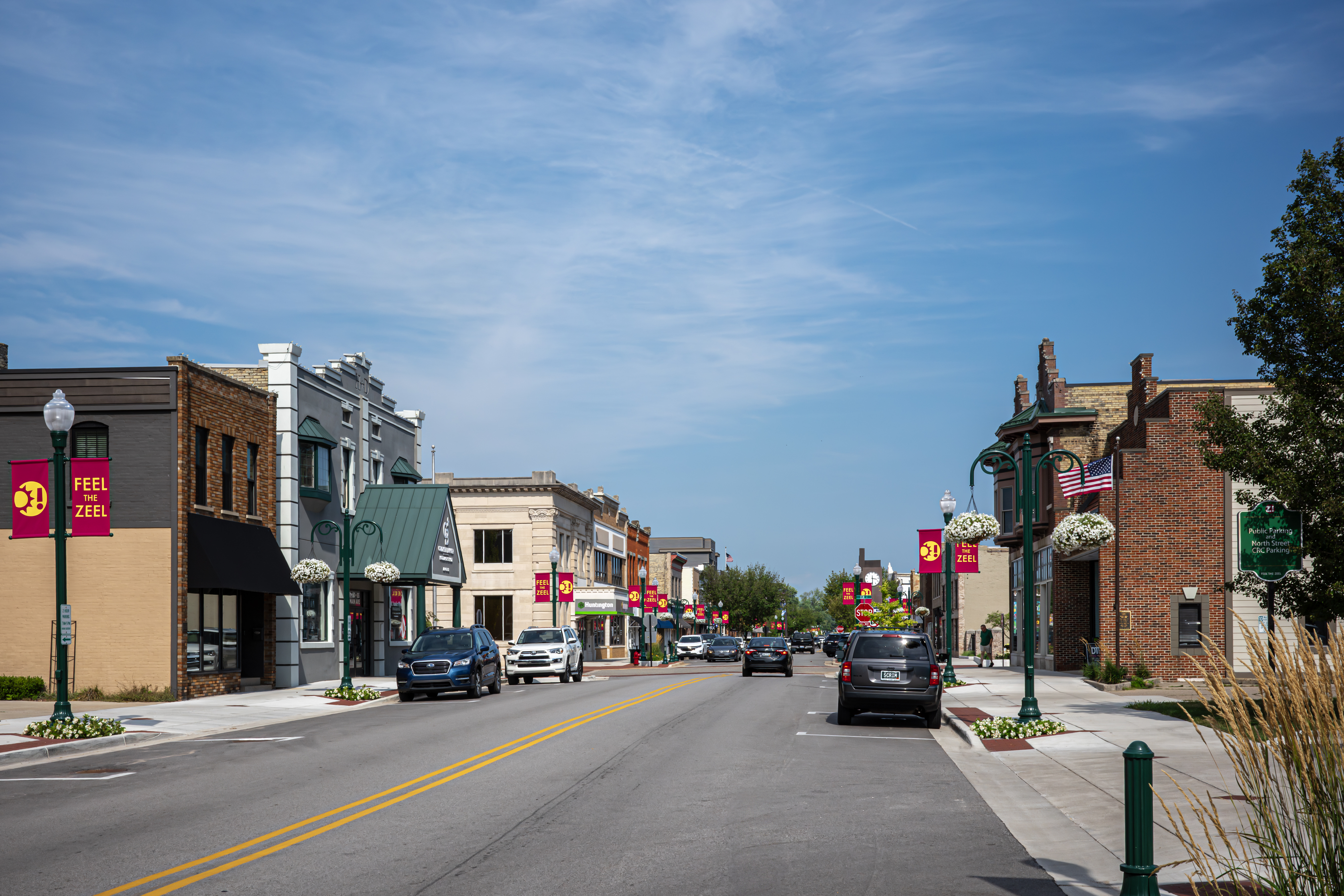
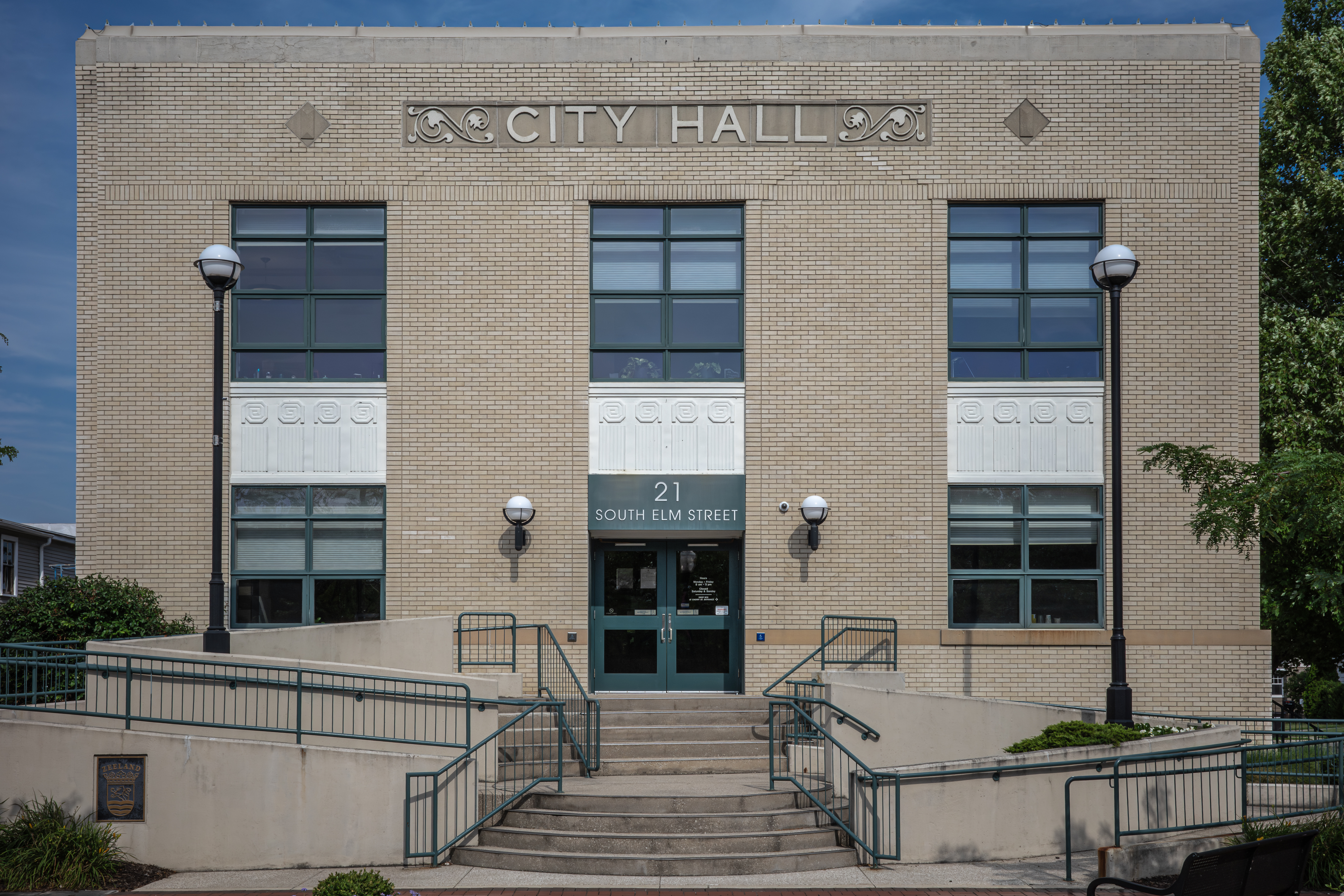
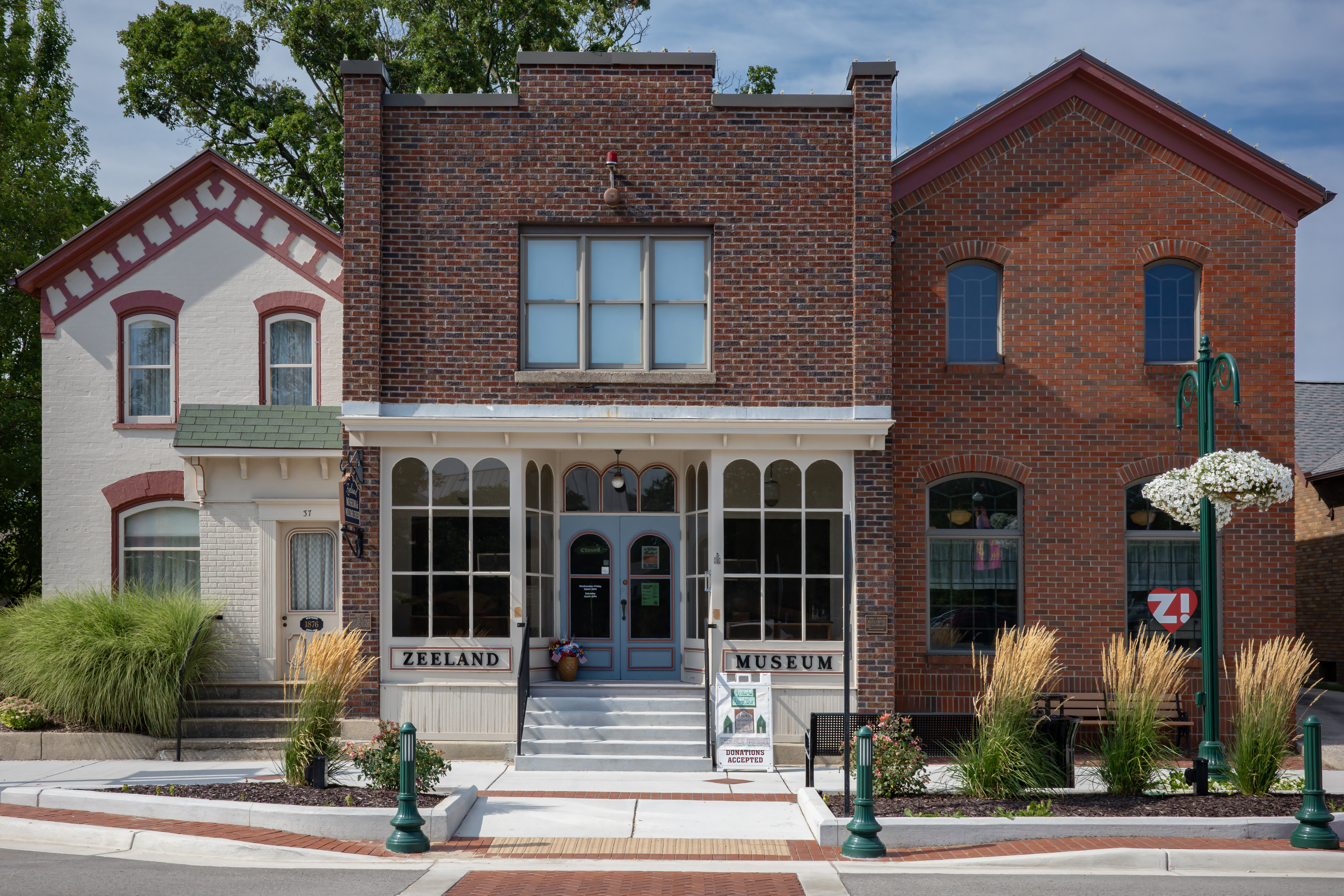
- Downtown Zeeland City hall City museum
- Motto: Feel the Zeel
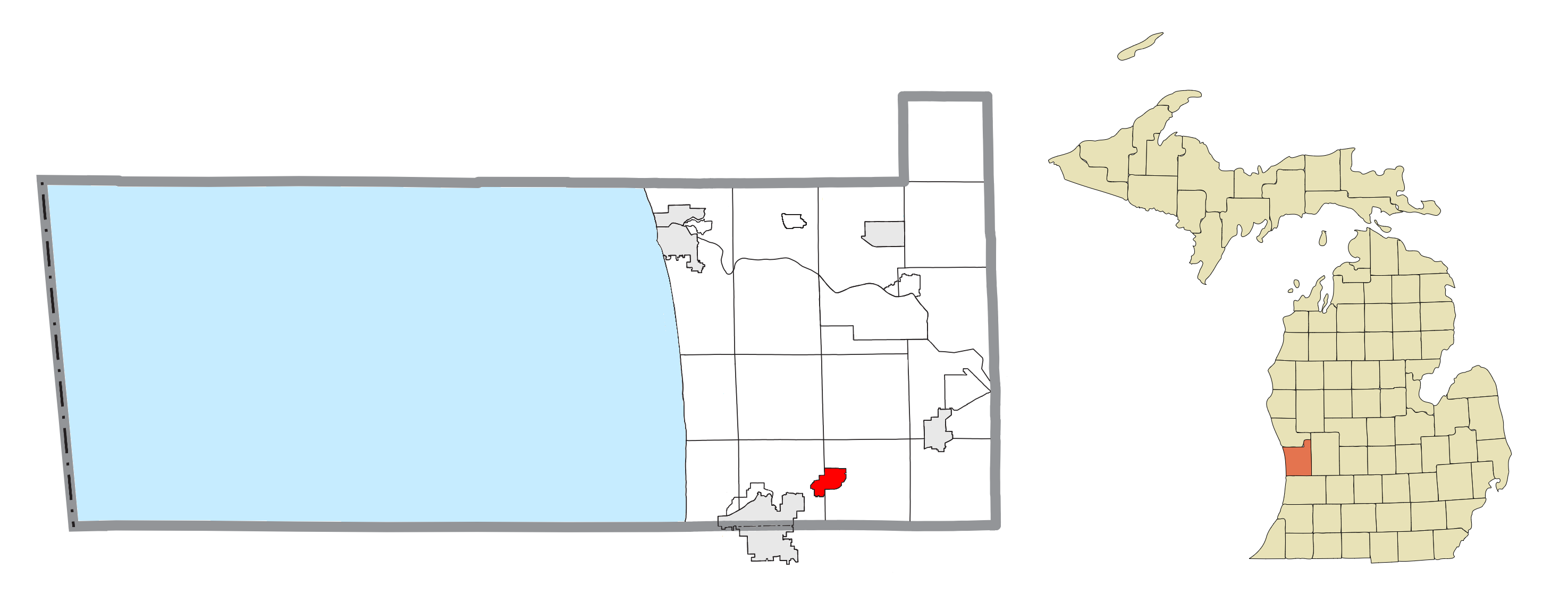
- Location within Ottawa County

- Location within the state of Michigan Location within the United States
- Coordinates: 42°48′45″N 86°01′07″W
- Country: United States
- State: Michigan
- County: Ottawa
- Settled: 1847
- Incorporated: 1875 (village); 1907 (city)

Government
  - Type: Council–manager
  - Mayor: Richard J. Van Dorp III
  - Manager: Tim Klunder

Area
  - Total: 3.01 sq mi (7.80 km^{2})
  - Land: 2.99 sq mi (7.75 km^{2})
  - Water: 0.019 sq mi (0.05 km^{2})
- Elevation: 650 ft (198 m)

Population (2020)
  - Total: 5,719
  - Density: 1,912.71/sq mi (738.50/km^{2})
- Time zone: UTC-5 (EST)
  - Summer (DST): UTC-4 (EDT)
- ZIP code(s): 49464
- Area code: 616
- FIPS code: 26-89260
- GNIS feature ID: 1616917
- Website: Official website

Zeeland (/ˈziːlənd/ ZEE-lənd) is a city in Ottawa County in the U.S. state of Michigan. The population was 5,719 at the 2020 census. The city is located at the western edge of Zeeland Charter Township. It is about 5 miles (8 km) east of Holland and 24 miles (38 km) southwest of Grand Rapids. Its name is taken from the Dutch province of Zeeland.

== History ==
In 1847, nearly 500 Dutch citizens sailed for America ostensibly to achieve religious freedom, although their decision to immigrate was probably also influenced by other factors, such as dire economic conditions in their home province of Zeeland, Netherlands and their opposition to modern scientific and social advances of the time.

The emigrants were led by Jannes Van de Luyster, a wealthy landowner who sold his holdings in the Netherlands to advance money for the members to pay their debts and buy passage to America. Their settlement, some 16,000 acres (65 km^{2}) of land once occupied by the Odawa people, was named after their home province of Zeeland.

Van de Luyster arranged for three ships to sail for the United States. He came on the first ship, arriving on June 27, 1847. He was followed by the Steketee group on July 4, and Reverend Van Der Meulen's group on August 1 of that year. The total number of settlers was 457.

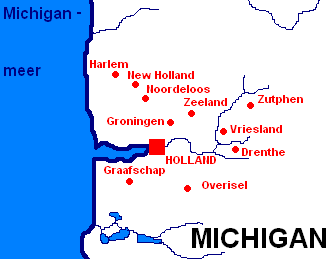
Dutch settlements in Michigan.

The first building was a church. The town of Zeeland was platted in 1849, and the school district was organized the following year.

Within twenty-five years, Zeeland had acquired a sawmill, a wagon factory, blacksmith shops, grocery stores, and a post office.

The village officially became a city in 1907. There was a two-story brick kindergarten building, a two-storey brick grade school, and a brick house building. The city also had four furniture factories, one large manufacturing plant, and several mills and smaller manufacturing industries.

== Geography ==
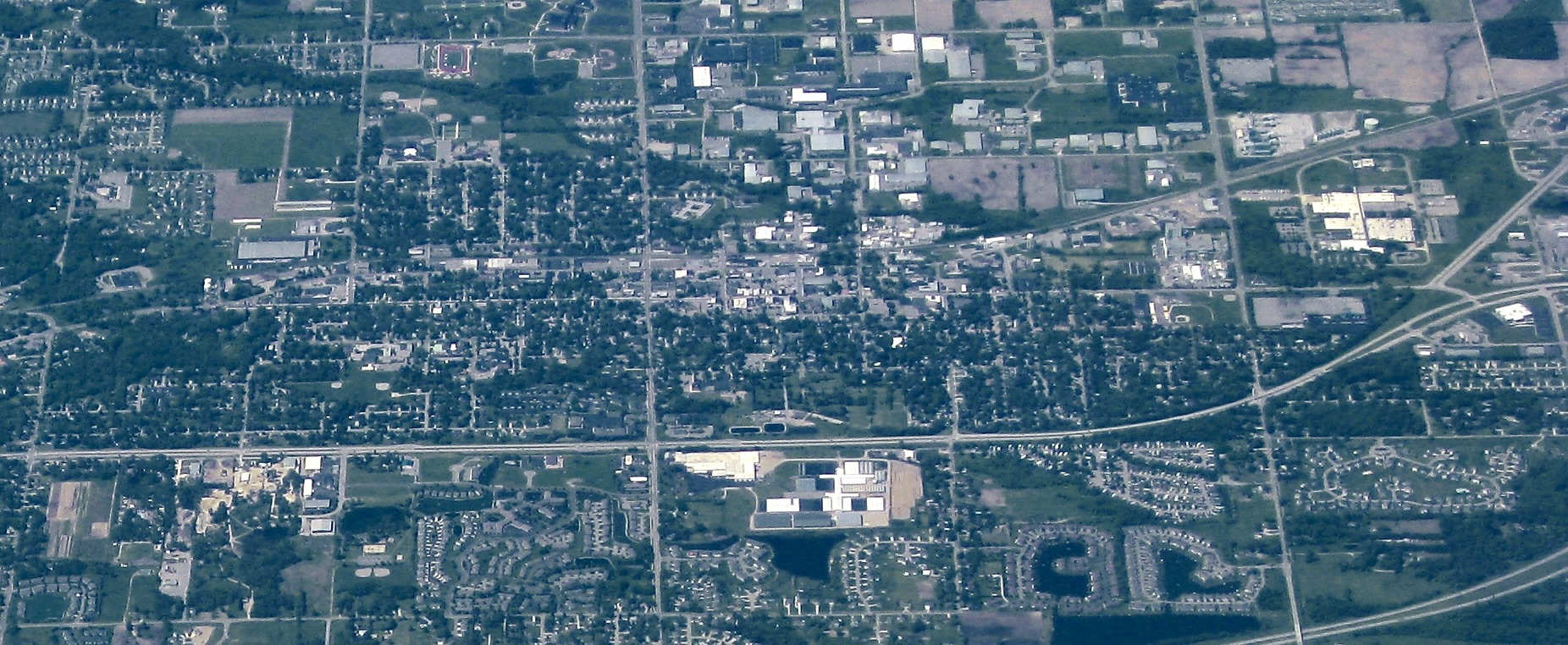
Aerial photo of Zeeland in 2009

According to the United States Census Bureau, the city has a total area of 3.01 square miles (7.80 km^{2}), of which 2.99 square miles (7.74 km^{2}) is land and 0.02 square miles (0.05 km^{2}) is water. The town itself is located on a hill, giving the city a higher elevation compared to the surrounding township land. Much of the outlying areas contain farmland and forest.

== Demographics ==
Historical population
Census	Pop.	Note	%±
1880	484		—
1890	785		62.2%
1900	1,326		68.9%
1910	1,982		49.5%
1920	2,275		14.8%
1930	2,850		25.3%
1940	3,007		5.5%
1950	3,075		2.3%
1960	3,702		20.4%
1970	4,734		27.9%
1980	4,764		0.6%
1990	5,417		13.7%
2000	5,805		7.2%
2010	5,504		−5.2%
2020	5,719		3.9%
U.S. Decennial Census

=== 2020 census ===
As of the 2020 census, Zeeland had a population of 5,719. The population density was 1,906.3 inhabitants per square mile (736.0/km^{2}). The median age was 39.7 years; 24.1% of residents were under the age of 18 and 23.9% were 65 years of age or older. For every 100 females, there were 86.2 males, and for every 100 females age 18 and over there were 80.8 males age 18 and over.

100.0% of residents lived in urban areas, while 0.0% lived in rural areas.

There were 2,382 households in Zeeland, of which 29.9% had children under the age of 18 living in them. Of all households, 49.4% were married-couple households, 14.6% were households with a male householder and no spouse or partner present, and 32.6% were households with a female householder and no spouse or partner present. About 33.6% of all households were made up of individuals, and 20.3% had someone living alone who was 65 years of age or older. There were 1,432 families residing in the city, with an average household size of 2.22 and an average family size of 2.89.

There were 2,472 housing units, of which 3.6% were vacant. The homeowner vacancy rate was 0.9% and the rental vacancy rate was 3.9%. Housing units had an average density of 824 per square mile (318.1/km^{2}).

Racial composition as of the 2020 census
Race	Number	Percent
White	5,055	88.4%
Black or African American	77	1.3%
American Indian and Alaska Native	15	0.3%
Asian	93	1.6%
Native Hawaiian and Other Pacific Islander	0	0.0%
Some other race	212	3.7%
Two or more races	267	4.7%
Hispanic or Latino (of any race)	425	7.4%

=== 2010 census ===
As of the census of 2010, there were 5,504 people, 2,246 households, and 1,426 families residing in the city. The population density was 1,840.8 inhabitants per square mile (710.7/km^{2}). There were 2,446 housing units at an average density of 818.1 per square mile (315.9/km^{2}). The racial makeup of the city was 93.8% White, 1.1% African American, 0.4% Native American, 1.3% Asian, 1.3% from other races, and 2.1% from two or more races. Hispanic or Latino of any race were 6.4% of the population.

There were 2,246 households, of which 31.1% had children under the age of 18 living with them, 52.5% were married couples living together, 8.2% had a female householder with no husband present, 2.8% had a male householder with no wife present, and 36.5% were non-families. 33.7% of all households were made up of individuals, and 21.3% had someone living alone who was 65 years of age or older. The average household size was 2.37 and the average family size was 3.04.

The median age in the city was 38.8 years. 25.4% of residents were under the age of 18; 7.6% were between the ages of 18 and 24; 23.8% were from 25 to 44; 20.6% were from 45 to 64; and 22.7% were 65 years of age or older. The gender makeup of the city was 44.8% male and 55.2% female.

=== 2000 census ===
As of the census of 2000, there were 5,805 people, 2,283 households, and 1,490 families residing in the city. The population density was 1,927.7 inhabitants per square mile (744.3/km^{2}). There were 2,389 housing units at an average density of 793.3 per square mile (306.3/km^{2}). The racial makeup of the city was 93.90% White, 0.59% African American, 0.14% Native American, 1.31% Asian, 0.02% Pacific Islander, 2.10% from other races, and 1.95% from two or more races. Hispanic or Latino of any race were 4.63% of the population.

There were 2,283 households, out of which 30.9% had children under the age of 18 living with them, 55.6% were married couples living together, 7.1% had a female householder with no husband present, and 34.7% were non-families. 32.3% of all households were made up of individuals, and 20.4% had someone living alone who was 65 years of age or older. The average household size was 2.45 and the average family size was 3.13.

In the city, ages of the residents spanned a broad range with 26.2% under the age of 18, 8.0% from 18 to 24, 26.5% from 25 to 44, 16.1% from 45 to 64, and 23.3% who were 65 years of age or older. The median age was 37 years. For every 100 females, there were 83.2 males. For every 100 females age 18 and over, there were 78.9 males.

The median income for a household in the city was $45,611, and the median income for a family was $53,227. Males had a median income of $35,288 versus $26,913 for females. The per capita income for the city was $20,801. About 2.8% of families and 4.6% of the population were below the poverty line, including 5.8% of those under age 18 and 3.4% of those age 65 or over.

== Education ==
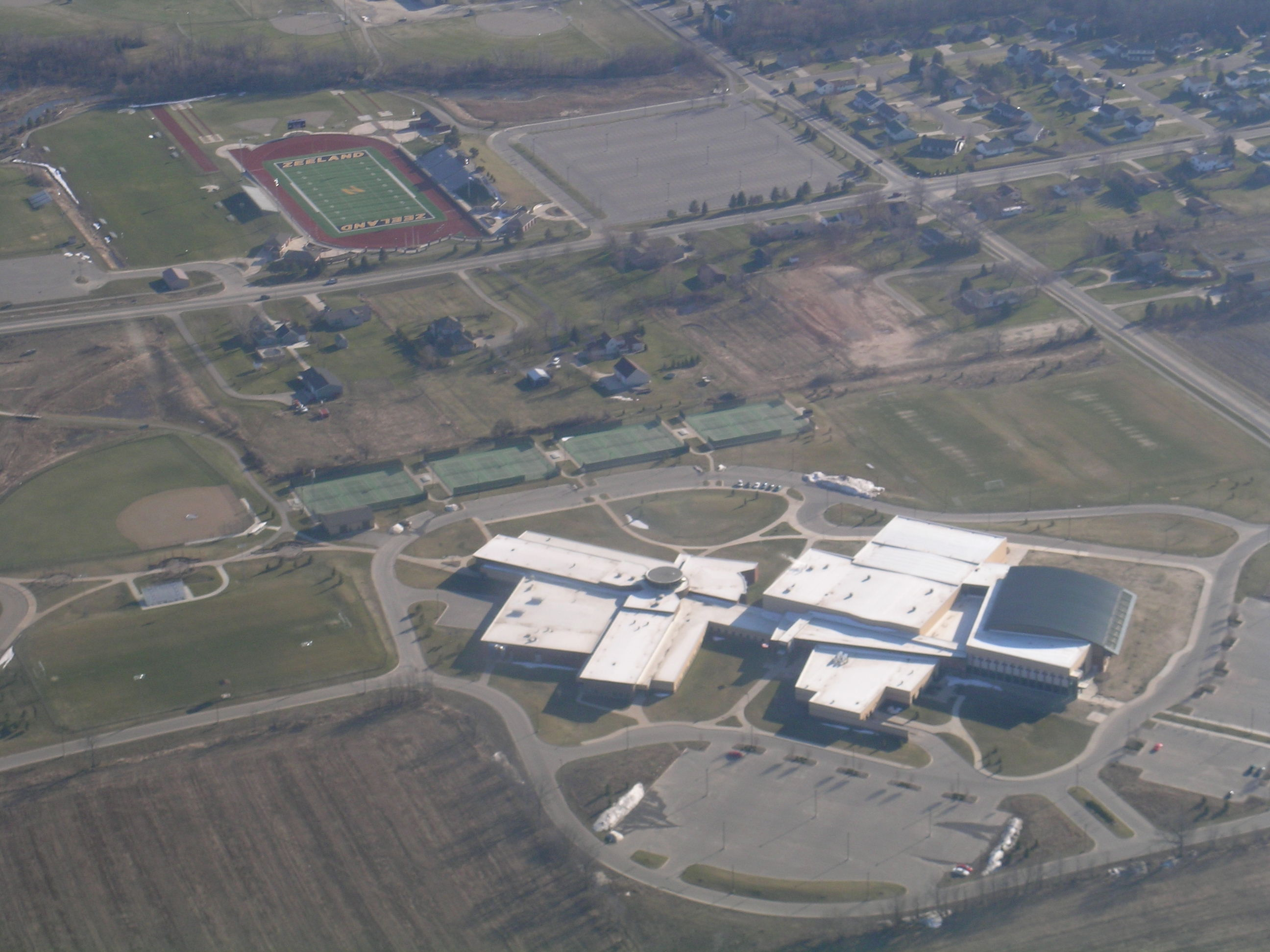
Zeeland West High School and athletic fields

K-12 public schools

- Roosevelt Elementary School
- New Groningen Elementary School
- Quincy Elementary School
- Adams Elementary School
- Woodbridge Elementary School
- Lincoln Elementary School
- Cityside Middle School
- Creekside Middle School
- Zeeland East High School
- Zeeland West High School
- Innocademy Charter School (K-8)
- iCademy Global (9-12)
- Ottawa Area Intermediate School District
- National Heritage Academies (Eagle Crest Charter Academy)

Private schools

- Zeeland Christian School

School issues

- In 2012, Zeeland school district superintendent Dave Barry was accused of plagiarism for using text from a blog post by Mark Rutherford without giving credit. The school board decided to punish Barry by suspending him for two weeks without pay. Barry said he respected the board's decision and promised it would not happen again, saying that he had "fallen short of the mark." Barry also said that this was not the only time he has taken credit for someone's work, but the number of times he has done so has not been released to the public.
- Prior to the release of the 1998 album Follow the Leader by the band Korn, Gretchen Plewes, a Zeeland high school assistant principal, said in an interview for a Michigan newspaper that the group's music is "indecent, vulgar, obscene and intends to be insulting" after giving a student, Eric VanHoven, a one-day suspension for wearing a shirt with the Korn logo on it. WKLQ was filmed giving away hundreds of free Korn T-shirts, which were donated by the band, outside the school. Ottawa County policemen helped hand out shirts as well. Korn filed a cease and desist order against Plewes and the school district for their comments. They also threatened a multimillion-dollar lawsuit, but both actions were dropped due to the band members' personal lives.

== Industry ==
Zeeland is home to several world-renowned companies. Those in the city of Zeeland include:

- Plascore (Honeycomb Manufacturing)
- Herman Miller (Office furnishings/equipment and modern furniture for the home)
- Howard Miller (Clocks and furniture)
- Gentex (Automotive and aerospace)
- Mead Johnson (Baby formula)
- ITW Drawform
- Reckitt has a manufacturing plant in Zeeland as well (Consumer goods)

== Transportation ==
Along with its surrounding area, Zeeland is served by the MAX (Macatawa Area Express) transportation system, which offers both on-demand and high-speed bus service, linking different parts of the city as well as commercial, medical and government locations outside the city. This service evolved from the former "Dial-A-Ride Transportation" (DART) system.

== Media ==
=== Newspapers ===
- The Zeeland Record - The local newspaper

=== Radio ===
- WHTC - Real News Now on 1450 WHTC and The New 99 7 FM
- WYVN - 92 7 The Van - Classic Hits for Holland and the Lakeshore 92.7 FM
- WTHS - Hope College Radio Station 89.9 FM
- JOY99 - Contemporary Christian Music 99.3 FM

== Sports achievements ==
- 1987, 1989–1991, 1994 Girl's Class B State Swimming and Diving Champions.
- 2003 Class C State Lacrosse Champions. Zeeland defeated Plymouth-Canton Chiefs 12–9. Mike DeJonge MVP.
- 2006 Division 4 State Football Champions. Zeeland West Dux defeated the Coopersville Broncos 22–0. - MVP Joe Leal
- 2006 Christopher Hodge becomes Zeeland's first male competitive cheerleader. He leads the Zeeland East Chix to first Division 2 State Championship
- 2011 Division 4 State Football Champions. Zeeland West Dux
- 2013 Division 3 State Football Champions. Zeeland West Dux
- 2015 Division 3 State Football Champions. Zeeland West Dux
- 2024 Division 3 State Football Champions. Zeeland West Dux

== Notable people ==
=== Arts and entertainment ===
- Renae Geerlings, actress, writer, film producer, and comics editor; born in Zeeland
- Jan M. Van Tamelen, art director; born in Zeeland

=== Business and industry ===
- D. J. De Pree, furniture executive and founding president of Herman Miller; born in Zeeland

=== Education and religion ===
- M. R. DeHaan, Bible teacher and founder of the Radio Bible Class; born in Zeeland
- Lester DeKoster, librarian, educator, editor, and author; born in Zeeland
- Anthony Diekema, sociologist and president of Calvin College from 1976 to 1995; born in Zeeland

=== Government and military ===
- Willard Ames De Pree, career diplomat and U.S. ambassador to Mozambique and Bangladesh; born in Zeeland
- Bill Huizenga, U.S. representative for Michigan's 4th congressional district; born in Zeeland
- Chris Kapenga, Wisconsin state senator; born in Zeeland
- Tom Meyer, former member of the Michigan House of Representatives; born in Zeeland
- Thomas J. Plewes, retired U.S. Army lieutenant general and former chief of the United States Army Reserve; born and raised in Zeeland
- George Van Peursem, former Speaker of the Michigan House of Representatives; lived in Zeeland
- Roger Victory, Michigan state senator; born in Zeeland

=== Science ===
- John Peter Buwalda, geologist and former head of the geological sciences division at the California Institute of Technology; born in Zeeland
- Paul de Kruif, microbiologist and science writer, best known for Microbe Hunters; born in Zeeland
- Donald Kroodsma, ornithologist and author known for research on birdsong; born in Zeeland
- Eugene van Tamelen, organic chemist; born in Zeeland
- Edward Wichers, chemist and former associate director of the National Bureau of Standards; born in Zeeland

=== Sports ===
- Kathy Arendsen, softball player and coach; born in Zeeland
- Ron Essink, former NFL offensive tackle; born in Zeeland
- Ed Hendricks, Major League Baseball pitcher; born in Zeeland
- Jim Kaat, former Major League Baseball pitcher and member of the Baseball Hall of Fame; born in Zeeland
- Jay Riemersma, former NFL tight end; grew up in Zeeland
- Ron Schipper, college football coach and member of the College Football Hall of Fame; born in Zeeland
- Vern Slagh, stock car racing driver; born in Zeeland
- Zach VanValkenburg, professional football linebacker; born in Zeeland
