= WTHS =

Radio station at Hope College in Holland, Michigan

- Holland, Michigan; United States
- Frequency: 88.9 MHz
- Branding: Eighty-Nine Nine, WTHS-FM

Programming
- Format: Alternative rock

Ownership
- Owner: Hope College

History
- Founded: September 1956
- First air date: September 27, 1985
- Former names: WTAS (unlicensed carrier current station; 1956-1984)
- Call sign meaning: "The Hope College Station"

Technical information
- Licensing authority: FCC
- Facility ID: 27622
- Class: A
- ERP: 1,000 watts
- HAAT: 47 meters (154 ft)
- Transmitter coordinates: 42.7878°N 86.1006°W

Links
- Public license information: Public file; LMS
- Website: wths.hope.edu

WTHS-FM (89.9 FM) is a college radio station licensed to Hope College in Holland, Michigan.

== History ==
=== Carrier current era ===
The station began as WTAS in 1956, when students Richard Brockmeier and Jack Hellriegel transmitted a signal from their room through the wiring of the then-new Kollen Hall (residence dormitory) on the Hope College campus. Brockmeier joined Hope's faculty in 1966, teaching computer science and physics until his death in 1993.

Regular programming began in 1957. WTAS originally meant "We're The Arkie Station", paying homage to the Arcadian Fraternity, to which Brockmeier and Hellriegel belonged. The staff reconsidered its campus-wide influence and WTAS officially became "THE ANCHOR STATION", renamed for the Anchor, Hope's symbol and a reference to the Holy Trinity. As reported in the April 26, 1957 issue of the student newspaper The Anchor, they had "realized the need of a new radio station to solve a problem which had arisen at the dorm. Due to modern construction methods of using reinforced steel and concrete, almost all outside signals are cut off from (AM) radios." For over 25 years, the station operated from studios in the basement at the southwest corner of Kollen Hall.

In 1981, WTAS began simulcasting at 103.3 FM, on a radio service then offered by local Continental Cablevision of Holland (now Comcast). The "FM cable" service carried a number of Chicago and West Michigan FM stations. It was offered to cable television subscribers throughout the Holland and Zeeland communities, including some on-campus rooms. WTAS was the only station carried in mono. The Holland Community channel carried by Continental Cablevision on channel 12, which scrolled public service events on the screen, also carried WTAS as its audio signal.

=== Converting to FM broadcasting ===
A student project to replace the aging AM carrier current station was started in the fall of 1979 by freshman Richard Kennedy. Tentative approval to move forward on this proposal was passed by the Hope College Student Congress on Monday, November 24, 1980. Under the advice of WZZM-TV Chief Engineer Dale Wolters (his father, Dr. Edward J. Wolters, taught Classics at Hope College for 40 years, retiring in 1966), E. Harold Munn and Associates of Coldwater was retained to do a feasibility engineering study. The application to the Federal Communications Commission was tied up when a newly founded Zeeland-based church attempted to secure the license for 89.9, thus delaying the actual official sign-on date until Friday, September 27, 1985.

The call signs "WLQX" ("The Lakeshore's Alternative") and "WMCH" ("West Michigan's Alternative") were proposed, but later it was decided to apply for WTHS, as it was closer to the original "WTAS" call letters. The WTAS-FM call sign was used at the time by a station in Crete, Illinois. That station since become WYCA. WTHS-FM 89.9 ("We're The Hope Station") was licensed to operate with 1,000 watts (directional) at 199 feet (154 feet above average terrain). New studios in the DeWitt Center were built adjacent to the theater.

Celebrating 50 years of broadcasting, WTHS relocated into the newly constructed Martha Miller Global Center for Communication, with the official dedication held on Wednesday, January 24, 2007. These facilities continue to feature "state-of-the-art" professional equipment, with DAD (digital audio delivery) software by ENCO of Southfield, used by some of the leading stations and networks in radio and television.

WTHS continues to thrive as an alternative rock station, operating 24 hours, 365 days a year.
