= M. R. DeHaan =

American physician and pastor (1891–1965)

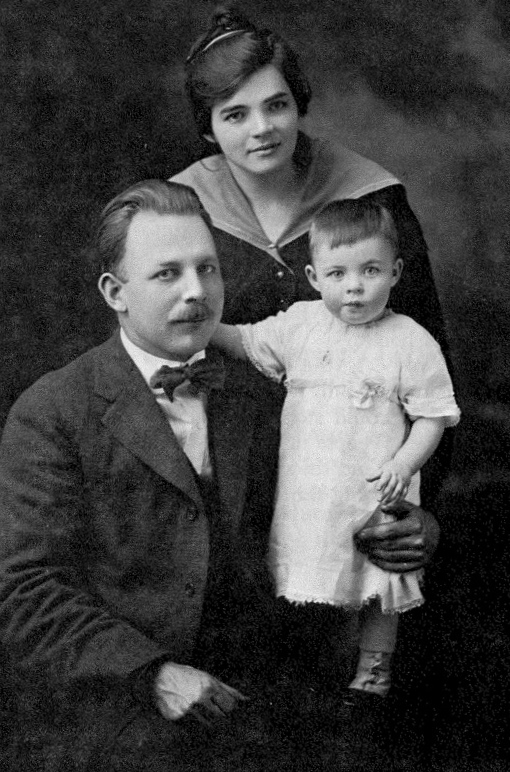
M.R. DeHaan, young physician with family, c. 1917

Martin Ralph DeHaan (March 23, 1891 – December 13, 1965) was an American Bible teacher, the founder of Radio Bible Class, and the co-editor of the monthly devotional guide Our Daily Bread.

== Early life ==
M. R. DeHaan was born in Zeeland, Michigan, to Reitze and Johanna Rozema DeHaan, emigrants from the Netherlands. After graduating from Zeeland High School in 1908, he attended Hope College in Holland, Michigan, for a year, before attending and graduating from the University of Illinois College of Medicine in Chicago in 1914.

DeHaan established a country practice in Byron Center, Michigan, about fourteen miles east of his hometown. He enjoyed the work of a physician, especially when fast thinking allowed him to save or improve lives. He even diagnosed his own mother's diabetes by looking at her eyes and was able to prescribe insulin, which was only recently invented. The practice frequently pushed him near exhaustion, at no time more so than during the 1918 flu pandemic, when for five days he never took off his clothes.

== Pastor ==
Although he had been reared in a devout home and was a regular churchgoer, DeHaan acquired "a rather stout appetite for alcohol" during his years of medical practice. In October 1921 he suffered a violent reaction to an injection of horse serum and hovered in critical condition at a Grand Rapids hospital, where he later wrote he "was born again of the Spirit". DeHaan said he had told God, "Spare my life and I'll serve You." Afterward, when a grateful patient presented DeHaan with a bottle of liquor, he emptied it down the drain. In the early spring of 1922, he returned home one day from house calls and told his wife, "I can't go on any longer. This is it!" He sold his medical practice, home, and office equipment and entered Western Theological Seminary in Holland, Michigan, practicing a bit of medicine on the side to pay the bills.

After graduating from seminary in 1925, DeHaan took his first pastorate at Calvary Reformed Church in Grand Rapids, where he attracted large audiences both at the church and on radio. Doctrinally he was Reformed but leaned toward premillennialism as expounded in the Scofield Reference Bible—even more so as he studied Scofield, William L. Pettingill, Harry Ironside, and James M. Gray. DeHaan's premillennialism shocked some of his Reformed brethren, but it was his refusal to perform infant baptism that caused the actual break with the Grand Rapids Classis of the Reformed Church in America.

In March 1929, DeHaan resigned from Calvary Reformed Church and founded the Calvary Undenominational Church in a nearby theater. By 1930 the congregation of 700 members had moved to a new auditorium, which seated 2000. Extra chairs were brought in to accommodate the overflow. However, in 1938, the church board fired the music director/youth minister without DeHaan's approval. DeHaan received approval of the congregation to rehire the minister and fire the board members. But when six men took legal action and obtained an injunction against DeHaan, he resigned. His health was also poor at the time; he had suffered his first heart attack in 1936 and another in 1938.

== Bible teacher ==
When he recovered, DeHaan began teaching Bible classes in weekday sessions, sometimes to a thousand listeners at a time. He also began broadcasting a half-hour program on the radio, at first in Detroit and then, by 1941, in Grand Rapids. Two national networks picked up the Radio Bible Class program, and its coverage grew to 600 stations around the world by the time of DeHaan's death. In 1956 DeHaan added the monthly Our Daily Bread devotional booklet to the sermons already being sent to listeners. DeHaan was not only an able Bible teacher but an astute businessman whom other broadcasters consulted to make their own operations more efficient. After Radio Bible Class dedicated a new building in 1958, DeHaan told an associate, "This thing is scaring me more than ever. I never envisioned this. I don't know why God ever picked me."

== Personal life ==
In 1914, DeHaan married Priscilla Venhuizen, and they had four children, including Richard DeHaan, who succeeded his father as director of Radio Bible Class. It was a source of satisfaction to DeHaan that as a doctor he had delivered all four of his children and then as a clergyman had married all of them.

"Tact was not his strongest virtue." DeHaan was likely to crash his fist into his hand or his desk to emphasize a point to his staff and demand that things be done his way. However, he was not reluctant to apologize, and he also mellowed with the years. Once, he and his wife had a disagreement and said nothing to each other during breakfast. When it was time to read the devotional in Our Daily Bread, she pushed it under his nose and said, "Are you the man who wrote this?" It was an article on kindness and forbearance. "That did it," said DeHaan. "We had to make up right there."

DeHaan refused offers of honorary degrees, preferring to have only the M.D. after his name. He kept up with medical advances, offered medical advice in some of his messages and books, and once saved the life of a woman whose trachea had been blocked by a piece of chicken.

DeHaan reveled in simple hobbies such as vegetable gardening, fly fishing, beekeeping, and investigating abandoned houses. He disliked social engagements but enjoyed talking with radio listeners whom he met in his travels.

== Death ==
In 1946, when DeHaan suffered a third heart attack and was sidelined for several months, his son Richard substituted for him. In February 1965, he experienced severe chest pains while preaching at Moody Bible Institute, and that proved to be his last public appearance. In July he was seriously injured in an automobile accident. Weakened by his heart condition, he died at home on December 13, 1965.

== Theological views ==
=== Discipleship ===
Like Free Grace Theologians, DeHaan distinguished coming to Jesus for salvation and for discipleship, arguing that while salvation is free, discipleship is costly, thus arguing that not every believer is a disciple.

=== Blood of Jesus ===
DeHaan emphasized the necessity of the literal blood of Christ in the atonement, believing that after Jesus rose from the dead, he sprinkled the blood on the mercy seat in heaven somewhere between John 20:17 and the ascension in the book of Acts. He hypothesized that some kind of chalice in heaven might store Jesus' blood.

=== The King James Version ===
DeHaan used the King James Bible, regarding most new versions of the Bible as "perversions".

== Bibliography ==
- Simon Peter (1954)
- The Tabernacle (1955)
- Studies in First Corinthians (1956)
- Jonah: Fact or Fiction? (1957)
- ”Hebrews: Twenty-Six Simple Studies In God’s Plan For Victorious Living” (1959)
- Galatians: Twenty-Two Simple Studies in Paul's Teaching of Law and Grace (1960)
- Law or Grace (1965)
- The Days of Noah (1963)
- Portraits of Christ in Genesis (1966)
- Pentecost and After (1966)
- 508 Answers to Bible Questions
- The Chemistry of the Blood (1943)
- Broken Things
- Adventures in Faith
- The Jew and Palestine in Prophecy
- Signs of the Times
- The Second Coming of Jesus (1944)
- Revelation
- Daniel the Prophet
- The Romance of Redemption
- Genesis and Evolution
- Coming Events in Prophecy
- Dear Doctor, I Have a Problem
- Our Daily Bread
- Bread for Each Day
