= Plascore Incorporated =

Manufacturer

- Type: Private
- Industry: Honeycomb Core and Composite Panels, Manufacturing
- Founded: 1977
- Headquarters: Zeeland, Michigan, United States
- Number of employees: 225
- Website: plascore.com

Plascore Incorporated manufactures honeycomb core, cleanrooms, and composite panels marketed under the brand Plascore. Honeycomb is used in aerospace, marine, military, safety, transportation, and other applications. When honeycomb is sandwiched between two surfaces, it effectively creates a distance between the two surfaces more or less like an I-beam. The resulting composite structure exhibits a high strength-to-weight ratio and shear strength. Shear strength is the measured ability of a material to resist structural failure. Plascore honeycomb is designed to increase shear strength while adding minimal additional weight. Plascore is a global organization, with a 185,000 sq. ft. headquarters and three additional manufacturing facilities in Zeeland, Michigan. Those three facilities are 50,000, 40,000 and 80,000 sq. ft. in size. The company also has an 85,000 sq. ft. manufacturing plant in Waldlaubersheim, Germany; and sales offices throughout the world. Plascore is AS/EN/JISQ9100, ISO 14001:2004, and ISO 9001:2008 Certified, and the company's PP Honeycomb has received a Lloyds Register Certificate of Approval of a Core Material. Plascore is also AS9100 certified, an industry standard required by the majority of major aircraft manufacturers that provides verification of consistent aerospace product quality.

== History ==
Plascore was founded in 1977 as a manufacturer of honeycomb core sold to various value added manufacturers. By the 1980s, Plascore’s product development and manufacturing capabilities led the company into value-added markets, including cleanroom walls, ceiling and door systems for semi-conductor and pharmaceutical sectors; panels for transportation products and building materials and energy absorbers for various markets.

In 2002, Plascore received an award from CERN for its role in the design and manufacture of large honeycomb panels used in detection chambers.

In August 2009, Plascore received tax abatements from the city of Zeeland for new equipment and machinery installed at its facilities in Zeeland.

With the increase in fuel costs and the growing need for lighter structure products, honeycomb gained increasing popularity in the marine industry, where it allows boat designers to add strength to hull manufacturing and also save weight, for example by using thin layers of stone laminated to honeycomb for luxury yacht countertops rather than solid stone.

In 2012, Plascore constructed a new facility for increased Nomex manufacturing capabilities.
