= Our Daily Bread (devotional) =

Christian booklet

Our Daily Bread is a Christian devotional calendar-style booklet published by Our Daily Bread Ministries (formerly RBC Ministries) in over 55 languages. The booklet is one of the most widely read Christian devotionals in circulation today. It was first released in April 1956, and includes writing about the Bible and insights into Christian living. The booklet's title originates from a line of the Lord's Prayer.

Each daily entry includes a Bible verse, and an insightful article. The booklet features a diverse range of authors, and also features additional scripture for those following Our Daily Bread's “Bible In One Year” reading program.

== History ==
Our Daily Bread Ministries began with a radio show called Detroit Bible Class in 1938, led by Dr. M.R. DeHaan. As the audience grew, the show became Radio Bible Class in 1941.

Over the years, the ministry expanded, and Our Daily Bread was first published in April 1956.

In 1987, an office in Carnforth in the United Kingdom was opened to help distribute Our Daily Bread Bible reading notes and other resources to readers across Europe. This then expanded to offices opening across Eastern Europe, in Minsk, Belarus (1994), Kiev, Ukraine (1997) and Smolensk, Russia (2005) allowing the publication and distribution of Our Daily Bread in Russian.

The organisation had another name change, in 1994, now called RBC Ministries, reflecting that the ministry was more than a radio station. A year later, in 1995, they launched their first website to provide their resources in a digital format across the world.

In 2002, a copy of Our Daily Bread went to space aboard the US. Space Shuttle Atlantis.

In 2003, Spanish readers were served through a new office opening up in Spain. This was followed up by a new office in Dublin, Ireland in 2006.

The commitment to being at the forefront of technological advances continued, with an app for Our Daily Bread being launched in multiple languages in 2011.

One final name change was to come, with RBC Ministries becoming Our Daily Bread Ministries in 2015.

An office opened in 2016 in Germany, serving German readers globally.

== Ministry Today ==
Our Daily Bread Ministries have become a global phenomenon, with millions of people relying on its resources to deepen their Christian faith. The ministry's booklet, various media platforms (radio, TV, books and website), and app (which has been downloaded over 2 million times) cater to a diverse audience.

Our Daily Bread remains a non-denominational, non-profit organization, creating various resources to aid Christian devotion. These resources include radio and television broadcasts, DVD, podcasts, books, mobile apps, or their website.

Their focus remains the same as its original founders, “reaching out to people all around the world with the message of God’s love” led by President Rick DeHaan, the grandson of the founder, Dr. M.R. DeHaan.

With over 600 employees in 32 countries, the ministry produces 60 million resources reaching people in over 150 countries. In Europe, their resources are available in English, Chinese (both Simplified and Traditional), Dutch, Italian, Polish, Portuguese, Spanish, German, Russian, and Ukrainian. They also work with Ministry partners to publish in Bulgarian, Croat, Slovenian, Azerbaijani, and Slovakian.
