= Our Daily Bread Ministries =

U.S. Christian media organization

- Formation: 1938
- Founder: Martin DeHaan
- Founded at: Detroit
- Type: NGO
- Tax ID no.: EIN: 38-1613981
- Headquarters: Grand Rapids, Michigan
- President: Matt Lucas
- Revenue: $64,910,282 USD (2023)
- Expenses: $66,043,558 USD (2023)
- Website: https://odb.org/
- Formerly called: Detroit Bible Class, Radio Bible Class, RBC Ministries

Our Daily Bread Ministries is a Christian organization founded by Martin De Haan in 1938. It is headquartered in Grand Rapids, Michigan, and has over 600 employees. The organization produces several devotional publications, which are read globally.

The ministry used to produce radio, television, and an online University program called "Our Daily Bread University".

== History ==
Originally called the "Detroit Bible Class", the organization later changed its name to the "Radio Bible Class", which was shortened to "RBC Ministries" in 1994. In 2015 it was renamed again, this time as "Our Daily Bread Ministries".

Its founder, Martin R. DeHaan, led the organization until 1965. Richard DeHaan took over in 1965 and led the organization until 1985, when his son, Mart DeHaan, became president. Mart DeHaan served from 1985 until October 5, 2011, when the presidency was passed to Mart's younger brother, Rick. Rick retired in 2021, as the last of the DeHaan family presidents. As of 2023, Matt Lucas is the current president.

== Courses ==
Artos Academy is an online learning platform that offers courses and resources in multiple languages for Bible, theology, leadership, and Christian apologetics. The academy serves individuals and organizations seeking self-directed Bible education, discipleship development, and credentialed training for ministry.

== Media ==
Our Daily Bread Publishing is the ministry's publisher. They publish daily devotionals that are also distributed via short radio spots. It has also published a series of booklets called The Discovery Series.

Our Daily Bread Ministries produced a television program, Day of Discovery, which airs in the United States and Canada. The program is also available online.

== Locations ==
Our Daily Bread Ministries has 35 offices worldwide, in the following locations:

Africa

- Kenya
- Nigeria
- South Africa
- Zimbabwe

America

- Argentina
- Brazil
- Canada
- Colombia
- Guyana
- Honduras
- Jamaica
- Mexico
- Peru
- Trinidad and Tobago
- United States

Asia – Pacific

- Hong Kong
- India
- Indonesia
- Japan
- Malaysia
- Myanmar
- Philippines
- Singapore
- South Korea
- Sri Lanka
- Taiwan
- Thailand

Australia & Oceania

- Australia
- Fiji
- New Zealand

Europe

- Belarus
- Ireland
- Portugal
- Russia
- Spain
- Ukraine
- United Kingdom

== Research ==
In July 2023, Our Daily Bread Ministries acquired the Center for Bible Engagement (CBE), the research division of Nebraska-based Back to the Bible (BttB). [7] The purpose of the acquisition was to integrate CBE’s research methodologies and technologies into the ministry and to provide global studies on trends in Bible engagement. Prior to the acquisition, Our Daily Bread Ministries partnered with the Center for Bible Engagement to conduct a comprehensive survey examining the spiritual lives of the general population in the United States and six other countries.

The Center for Bible Engagement is best known for its “Power of 4” research, a study that found an association between reading the Bible at least four a more days per week and measurable changes in both positive and negative behaviors.
