= List of Christian rock bands =

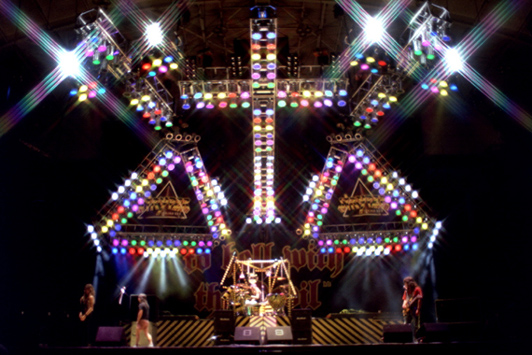
Stryper

The birth of contemporary Christian music dates back to the late 1960s, but Christian rock came into its own in the 1980s.

Billboard magazine started to post the Top 10 Christian rock songs, and some radio stations started to play Christian rock. Bands such as DC Talk, Jars of Clay, Audio Adrenaline and many others achieved commercial success. This list excludes bands that are primarily heavy metal or hardcore punk. Those bands appear in the list of Christian metal artists and list of Christian hardcore bands, respectively.

The Encyclopedia of Contemporary Christian Music defines contemporary Christian music (CCM) as "music that appeals to self-identified fans of contemporary Christian music on account of a perceived connection to what they regard as Christianity". Based on that definition, this list may include bands who work in the Christian music industry, as well as artists in the general market whose lyrics reflect their Christian faith (or where either the artists themselves and other sources identify members as performing Christian music). Some bands resist the "Christian rock" label, but are still identified under the label by outside sources.

== List ==
=== 0–9 ===
- 12 Stones (hard rock, Christian rock) (2000–present)
- 2nd Chapter of Acts – (CCM) (1972–1988)
- 33Miles (CCM, pop rock) (2005–present)
- 38th Parallel – (alternative rock, rock, rap rock) (2001–2002)
- 39 Stripes – (alternative rock, hard rock) (2010–present)
- 4-4-1 – (rock, post-punk, alternative rock, pop) (1983–1988)
- 7eventh Time Down – (hard rock) (2004–present)
- The 77s – (rock) (1980–present)

=== A ===
- Abandon – (Christian rock, alternative rock, pop) (2008–present)
- Abandon Kansas – (Christian rock, alternative rock) (2005–2015)
- Above the Golden State – (rock, CCM) (2007–2014)
- Ace Troubleshooter – (pop punk) (1996–2005)
- AD (rock) (1984–1988)
- Addison Road – (rock, CCM, alternative rock) (2002–2012)
- After Edmund – (alternative rock, art rock, rock) (2001–2015)
- After the Chase – (CCM, rock) (2003–present)
- After the Fire – (CCM, rock) (1974–1986, 2004–2015)
- The Afters – (pop, rock, alternative rock, CCM) (1999–present)
- Adam Again – (alternative rock, funk rock) (1982–2000)
- Alisa – (hard rock) (1983–present)
- All Star United – (rock, CCM) (1997–present)
- All Together Separate – (CCM, funk rock) (1998–2003)
- Allies – (hard rock, rock, CCM) (1985–1992)
- The Almost – (alternative rock) (2005–present)
- Altar Boys - (punk) (1982–1992)
- Anberlin – (alternative rock) (2002–2014, 2019–present)
- Anchor & Braille – (acoustic rock, electronica, folk) (2004–present)
- Anthem Lights – (pop rock, Christian rock, Christian pop, R&B) (2007–present)
- Anyday – (pop rock) (2009–present)
- As Lions – (alternative metal) (2016–present)
- Atomic Opera – (hard rock, heavy metal, progressive metal) (1991–present)
- As Cities Burn – (indie rock, post-hardcore, progressive rock) (2002–2009, 2012–2016, 2017–present)
- Ashes Remain – (rock) (2001–present)
- Audio Adrenaline – (rock, alternative rock) (1989–2007, 2012–2017)
- August Burns Red - (Metalcore, Christian metal, progressive metalcore) (2003–present)

=== B ===
- A Band Called David – (CCM) (1974–1988)
- BarlowGirl – (Christian rock, CCM, alternative rock, rock) (2000–2012)
- Barnabas – (hard rock, punk rock, heavy metal, tech metal) (1977–1986)
- Dave Barnes (2002–present)
- Barratt Band – (rock) (1980–1986)
- Basehead – (alternative rock, alternative hip hop) (1992–present)
- Beanbag – (rock) (1995–2002)
- The Benjamin Gate – (Christian rock) (1998–2003)
- Between the Trees – (emo, pop punk, indie rock) (2005–2010)
- Between Thieves – (power pop, punk rock, Southern rock, pop punk) (1990–2001)
- Big Daddy Weave – (rock, CCM) (2002–present)
- Big Dismal – (rock) (2003–present)
- Big Fil – (rock, punk rock)
- Big Tent Revival – (blues rock) (1991–2000, 2012–present)
- Bleach – (rock) (1995–2004, 2010–present)
- Blessthefall – (post-hardcore) (2003–present)
- Blind – (rock) (1999–2005)
- Blindside – (post-hardcore, rock) (1994–present)
- Bluetree – (rock, contemporary worship music) (2004–2017)
- Brave Saint Saturn – (astro-rock, rock) (1999–present)
- Lincoln Brewster – (rock, contemporary worship music) (1994–present)
- Bride – (hard rock, heavy metal, thrash metal) (1983–present)
- The Brothers Martin – (indie rock, electronica) (2006–present?)
- Building 429 – (rock) (1999–present)
- Burlap to Cashmere – (CCM, flamenco) (1994–present)
- By the Tree – (CCM) (1997–present)

=== C ===
- Cadet - (Christian alternative rock, garage rock, rockabilly) (2000–2004)
- Caedmon's Call – (folk rock, CCM) (1993–2010)
- CAIN – (CCM)
- Jeremy Camp – (rock) (2000–present)
- Steve Camp – (Christian rock) (1978–present)
- Candlefuse – (Christian alternative rock, hard rock) (1999–present)
- Capital Lights – (rock) (2002–2009, 2010–2012)
- Carman - (Christian rock) (1987–2001)
- Casting Crowns – (rock, CCM) (1999–present)
- Charizma – (rock, pop, hard rock, CCM) (1981–present)
- Children 18:3 – (punk rock) (1999–present)
- The Choir – (alternative rock) (1984–present)
- City Sleeps – (alternative rock, Christian rock) (2004–2013)
- The Classic Crime – (indie rock, emo, alternative CCM) (2004–present)
- Code of Ethics – (new wave, pop, Europop, industrial rock) (1991–2001, 2008–present)
- Paul Colman Trio – (rock) (1998–2004, 2009–present)
- Colony House – (indie rock) (2009–present)
- Common Children – (alternative rock) (1995–2002)
- Consider the Thief – (indie rock, post-hardcore, experimental rock) (2007–2009, 2012)
- Consumed by Fire - (Christian pop, southern rock, roots rock) (2010–present)
- Cool Hand Luke – (indie rock, alternative rock, rock, emo) (1998–2011, 2017–present)
- Copeland – (indie rock, indie pop, emo) (2000–2009, 2014–present)
- Crash Rickshaw – (indie rock, alternative rock, rock) (2001–present)
- Jimi Cravity – (Christian pop) (2012–present)
- Creed – (post-grunge, hard rock, alternative rock, alternative metal) (1994–2004, 2009–2012, 2023–present)
- Critical Mass – (modern rock, rock, post-grunge, rock) (1996–present)
- Christafari – (reggae, funk rock) (1989–present)
- Crumbächer – (new wave, rock, synthpop) (1983–1989)
- Rick Cua - (rock) (1980–Present)

=== D ===
- Dakoda Motor Co. – (surf rock, alternative rock) (1991–1997, 2006–present)
- Daniel Amos – (alternative rock) (1974–present)
- Daniel Band – (hard rock, classic rock) (1979–present)
- David and the Giants – (rock) (1963–present)
- David Crowder Band (1995–2012)
- DC Talk – (rock, R&B, hip hop) (1987–present)
- Day of Fire (post-grunge) (2003–2010)
- DeGarmo and Key – (pop, rock) (1978–2010)
- Dead Artist Syndrome – (gothic rock) (1990–1995, 2001–2020)
- Dead Poetic – (hard rock, alternative rock) (1997–2007)
- Deas Vail – (alternative rock) (2003–2012)
- Decyfer Down – (nu metal, hard rock, post-grunge) (1999–present)
- DecembeRadio – (Southern rock) (2003–2012)
- Delirious? – (alternative rock, rock) (1992–2009)
- Demon Hunter – (christian metal, metalcore, alternative metal, groove metal, nu metal) (2000–present)
- Desperation Band – (CCM) (2002–2017)
- The Devil Wears Prada - (Christian metal) (early) (2005–present)
- Diante do Trono – (worship, pop, pop rock, CCM) (1997–present)
- Difference United – (indie pop, rock) (2006–present)
- Die Happy – (rock) (1990–1994)
- DigHayZoose – (funk, rock) (1990–1996)
- The Digital Age – (modern rock) (2012–present)
- Disciple – (hard rock, alternative metal, heavy metal, Southern metal)(the bestone) (1992–present)
- Disperse – (rock, garage rock) (1996–2004)
- Colton Dixon – (Christian rock) (2010–present)
- Dizmas – (rock, alternative rock, post-hardcore) (2002–2009)
- Dogs of Peace - (rock) (1996, 2016)
- downhere – (rock, alternative rock) (1999–2012)
- Dryve - (alternative rock, Christian rock) (1993–1998)

=== E ===
- Eager – (rock) (1995–1998)
- Earthsuit – (rock, rap rock) (1995–2003)
- East West – (hardcore rock, hard rock, nu metal) (1993–2003)
- Echoing Angels – (rock) (1999–present)
- Eden's Bridge – (Celtic, folk rock, pop, progressive rock) (1993–present)
- The Electrics – (celtic rock, folk rock, Celtic) (1988–present)
- Elevation Worship – (Christian rock (2007–present)
- Eleventyseven – (power pop, electronica) (2002–2014)
- Embodyment – (hard rock, alternative metal, death metal) (1993–2004)
- Emery – (hard rock, post-hardcore, emocore) (2001–present)
- Éowyn – (alternative rock) (1999–present)
- Ever Stays Red – (indie pop, rock) (2002–2008)
- Everfound – (rock, alternative) (2005–present)
- Everlife – (pop rock, pop punk, power pop) (2001–2013)
- Everman – (rock) (1996–2004)
- Everyday Sunday – (rock, alternative rock, pop punk) (1997–2016)

=== F ===
- FM Static – (rock, pop punk, alternative rock) (2003–present)
- Fair – (rock, alternative rock) (2005–2012 (hiatus))
- Falling Up – (experimental rock, rock, hard rock) (2001–2016)
- Family Force 5 – (crunkcore, rock, rap rock, alternative rock) (2004–2018)
- Fee – (rock, worship) (2005–2010)
- Fighting Instinct – (rock) (2004–2008)
- Fine China - (indie rock, indie pop) (1997–present)
- Fireflight – (alternative rock, rock, hard rock) (1999–present)
- Five Iron Frenzy – (ska) (1995–2003, 2011–present)
- Flyleaf – (alternative rock, hard rock) (2002–2016, 2022–present)
- Fono – (alternative rock, rock) (1996–?)
- Fold Zandura – (alternative rock) (1995–1999)
- Foolish Things – (rock, alternative rock) (1997–2008)
- Forever Changed – (rock, punk rock, indie rock) (1999–2006)
- for King & Country – (rock, CCM) (2011–present)
- For Love Not Lisa (hard rock) (1990–1996)
- The Fray – (rock, pop) (2002–present)
- Peter Furler (2011–present)
- Further Seems Forever – (rock, emo, indie rock) (1998–2006, 2010–present)

=== G ===
- Ghoti Hook – (pop punk) (1990–2002, 2009)
- Glowin' Moses – (pop rock, rock) (1999–2008)
- The Glorious Unseen – (rock, contemporary music) (2007–present)
- Jamie Grace – (CCM, folk)
- Grammatrain – (rock, post-grunge) (1994–1998, 2009–present)
- Gretchen – (alternative rock) (2000–present)
- Grey Holiday – (rock, indie rock, pop) (2003–2008)
- GRITS – (hip hop) (1995–present)
- Group 1 Crew – (hip hop) (2003–2017)
- Guardian – (rock, metal, CCM) (1982–present)
- Guerilla Rodeo – (pop punk) (2004–2005)
- Michael Gungor (2010–present)

=== H ===
- Charlie Hall – (Christian rock) (1991–present)
- Halo – (rock)
- Harvest – (CCM, Jesus music, gospel)
- Hawk Nelson – (pop punk, rock, punk rock)
- HB – (hard rock, rock, metal)
- Mark Heard – (Christian rock, folk rock)
- Hearts Like Lions – (indie rock)
- Hearts of Saints – (worship, rock, CCM)
- Hillsong United – (worship, rock, CCM)
- Hillsong Worship (praise and worship) (1983–present)
- Hokus Pick – (Christian rock, CCM)
- Holy Soldier – (rock)
- Honey – (rock, alternative rock)
- Jimmy Hotz – (rock, progressive rock, art rock)
- House of Heroes – (rock)
- Hyper Static Union – (Christian rock)

=== I ===
- I Am Terrified – (hard rock, metal)
- I Am They – (CCM, Christian rock, contemporary worship music)
- Icon for Hire – (hard rock)
- Idle Cure – (hard rock, arena rock)
- The Imperials – (CCM, Christian rock)
- The Insyderz – (Christian ska, punk)
- Ivoryline – (alternative rock, rock, emo)

=== J ===
- Jacob's Trouble – (rock, pop rock) (1989–1998)
- JAG – (rock)
- Jars of Clay – (rock, pop rock, alternative rock, acoustic rock)
- Jason Truby – (rock, hard rock)
- Jason and the G-Men - (rock)
- Jerusalem – (rock, metal)
- Jesus Culture – (progressive rock, rock)
- John Schlitt – (rock)
- Johnny Q. Public – (alternative rock)
- Jonah33 – (metal, alternative metal, hard rock) (2002–2008, 2014–present)
- Joshua (rock)
- Joy Electric – (synthpop) (1994–present)
- The Juliana Theory – (emo, indie rock)
- Justifide – (rock)

=== K ===
- Phil Keaggy – (CCM, progressive rock)
- Mat Kearney – (rock, folk, CCM, hip hop) (2003–present)
- Kerry Livgren – (rock, hard rock, progressive rock, folk rock)
- Kids in the Way – (alternative rock, post-grunge, Christian rock)
- King's X – (hard rock, progressive metal)
- Michael Knott – (alternative rock) (1986–present)
- The Kry – (rock)
- Kutless – (rock, alternative rock, worship music)

=== L ===
- LVL – (industrial rock, industrial metal, rock) (1996–present)
- Lecrae – (Christian hip hop) (2004–present)
- Leeland – (rock, progressive rock, CCM) (2000–present)
- Mylon LeFevre and Broken Heart (rock, CCM) (1982–1992)
- Legend Seven – (rock) (1990–1994)
- The Letter Black – (rock, hard rock) (2006–present)
- Leviticus – (rock, metal) (1981–1990, 2003)
- Liberation Suite – (rock) (1976–2008)
- Liberty N' Justice – (hard rock) (1991–present)
- Lifehouse - (alternative rock, post-grunge, pop rock) (1996–present)
- Lifesavers Underground – (rock, new wave, post-punk, gothic rock) (1986–1998)
- The Listening – (rock, alternative rock) (2004–present)
- Lost Dogs – (Americana, traditional, country, folk, rock, blues) (1991–present)
- Luna Halo – (rock) (1999–2012)
- Lust Control – (thrash punk) (1988–1995, 2011–present)

=== M ===
- Mad at the World – (synthpop) (1987–1998, 2017–present)
- Mae – (rock, indie rock, emo, power pop, alternative rock) (2001–2010, 2013–present)
- Matt Maher – (Christian rock) (2000–present)
- Mainstay – (rock) (2001–2008)
- Manafest – (rap rock) (2000–present)
- Mandisa – (CCM) (2006–2024)
- Darrell Mansfield – (blues rock) (1974–2018)
- Mastedon – (Christian rock, hard rock, rock) (1987–present)
- Matthew Thiessen and the Earthquakes – (piano rock, rock, alternative rock)
- Shawn McDonald – (CCM) (2000–present)
- MercyMe – (rock, CCM) (1994–present)
- mewithoutYou – (experimental rock, alternative rock, indie rock, acoustic rock, folk rock, spiritual) (2001–present)
- Mind Garage – (psychedelic rock, hard rock, acid rock, progressive rock, rock) (1967–1970 & reunions in 1983, 2007, 2008)
- Geoff Moore and Geoff Moore and the Distance – (rock, pop rock) (1983–present)
- Monday Morning – (alternative rock, pop rock) (2000–present)
- Morella's Forest – (Noise pop, space music) (1992–2002)
- Neal Morse – (progressive rock, progressive metal, CCM)
- Mortal – (industrial, dance, rock) (1988–1996, 2002)
- Mosaic MSC – (CCM, Christian rock) (2014–present)
- Mukala – (rock) (1997–2000)
- Mumsdollar – (punk rock, rock) (1998–2009)
- Mu5tard – (rock)
- The Museum – (pop rock, CCM) (2008–present)
- Mutemath – (alternative rock, indie) (2002–2018 as band, 2018–present as solo)
- MxPx – punk (1992–present)
- The Myriad – (alternative rock, rock, indie rock) (2002–2009)

=== N ===
- Needtobreathe – (rock, Southern rock) (2001–present)
- Neon Cross – (hard rock, metal) (1984–present)
- Nevertheless – (rock, power pop) (2003—2009, 2016–present)
- New Jerusalem – (rock, CCM) (1994–2004)
- Newsboys – (pop, pop rock, rock, CCM) (1985–present)
- NF (Christian hip hop) (2010–present)
- Nine Lashes – (hard rock, alternative metal) (2006–present)
- Norma Jean (Metalcore, post-hardcore) (1997–present)
- No Tagbacks (now called House of Heroes) – (rock) (1998–present)
- Larry Norman – (folk rock, rock, Jesus music)
- Number One Gun – (rock, indie rock, alternative rock, experimental rock) (2002–2006, 2007–2014)

=== O ===
- The O.C. Supertones – (ska) (1995–2005, 2010–present)
- Oficina G3 – (hard rock, rock, pop rock, metal, progressive metal, nu metal) (1987–present)
- Onehundredhours – (rock) (2001–2009)
- One Bad Pig – (Christian punk) (1985–1994, 2000, 2002, 2005)

=== P ===
- Palavrantiga (Christian rock) – (2008–present)
- Parachute Band – (alternative rock, worship) (1995–present)
- Passion Worship Band – (Christian rock) (1997–present)
- Pedro the Lion – (indie rock) (1995–present)
- Alexis Peña – (rock, CCM) (2002–present)
- Petra – (rock, progressive rock, hard rock, country rock, heavy metal) (1972–2006, 2010–present)
- Phatfish (rock, worship) (1994–2014)
- Philmont – (rock, pop, punk) (2005–2012)
- Philmore – (rock, alternative rock) (1998–2005)
- Pillar – (rock, hard rock, rapcore) (1998–present)
- Planetshakers – (rock, alternative rock) (2000–present)
- Plankeye – (rock, alternative rock) (1994–2002)
- Plumb – (CCM, alternative rock, pop, dance, electronica) (1997–present)
- Pocket Full of Rocks – (rock) (1995–present)
- P.O.D. – (rock, rap metal, rapcore, nu metal) (1992–present)
- Poor Old Lu – (alternative rock, rock) (1990–1996, 2000)
- Pray for Rain – (rock) (1989–1997, 2001, 2004, 2006, 2012–2013)
- The Prayer Chain – (alternative rock) (1991–1995)
- Project 86 – (hard rock, post-hardcore, alternative metal, nu metal) (1996–present)
- Puller – (post-grunge) (1995–2001)

=== Q ===
- Quench – (rock, alternative rock, emo, pop punk) (2001–2009)
- Queens Club – (alternative rock) (2008–2011)

=== R ===
- Rachel Rachel – (Christian rock, pop rock) (1990–1994)
- Random Hero – (rock, Christian metal)
- Reality Check – (alternative rock, CCM)
- Red – (alternative metal, alternative rock, metal, nu metal, post-grunge)
- Matt Redman – (Christian rock) (1993–present)
- Reform the Resistance – (Christian rock, alternative metal)
- Relient K – (alternative rock, pop punk, punk rock)
- Remedy Drive – (rock, pop rock, indie rock)
- Rend Collective - (folk rock) (2007–present)
- Resurrection Band – (rock, blues rock, Christian metal, hard rock, heavy metal, new wave)
- Revive – (rock)
- Rhubarb – (rock)
- Rob Rock – (power metal, hard rock)
- Rock n Roll Worship Circus – (CCM) (1999–2004)
- Rock Productions Music – (rock, nu metal, hard rock)
- Rocketboy – (alternative rock)
- Rojo – (alternative rock, rock, pop rock, pop)
- Rosa de Saron – (pop rock, alt rock, heavy metal, hard rock)
- Royal Tailor – (pop rock, punk rock, rap rock)
- Run Kid Run – (pop punk, indie rock, rock)
- Rush of Fools – (rock, CCM)
- Ruth – (indie rock, rock)

=== S ===
- Sacrament - (Christian Metal, metalcore) (1989-1994)
- Sacred Warrior - (Christian Metal) (1988-present)
- Saint - (Heavy metal) (1984-present)
- Salvador – (CCM, Latin) (1999–present)
- Sanctus Real – (rock, alternative rock, power pop) (1996–present)
- Scott Stapp (1993—present)
- Seabird – (alternative rock, pop) (2004–present)
- Search the City (2006–2009, 2011–present)
- The Send – (alternative rock, rock) (2006–2008)
- Sent by Ravens – (alternative rock, post hardcore) (2006–2012, 2025–present)
- Servant – (rock, CCM) (1976–1986)
- Seven Day Jesus – (rock) (1994–1998)
- Seven Places – (rock) (1999–2005)
- Sevenglory – (pop rock) (2001–present)
- Seventh Day Slumber – (rock, Christian rock, hard rock, post-grunge, post-hardcore, alternative metal) (1996–present)
- Shaded Red – (alternative rock, rock) (1993–2000)
- Sherwood – (alternative rock) (2002–2012)
- Sidewalk Prophets – (Contemporary Christian music, pop rock, indie rock) (2001–present)
- Signum Regis - (Power metal, Melodic metal, Heavy metal) (2007–present)
- Silage – (alternative rock, CCM) (1996–1999)
- Silverline – (CCM, Christian rock, pop rock) (2006–present)
- Since October – (metal, rock, post-grunge) (2005–present)
- Sixpence None the Richer – (pop rock) (1992–2004, 2007–present)
- The Skies Revolt – (indie rock Christian rock) (2004–present)
- Skillet – (rock, Christian rock, alternative rock, hard rock, Christian metal, early industrial music, early grunge) (1996–present)
- Across the Sky – (CCM, worship, pop) (2000–2005)
- Skylight (2009–present)
- Slick Shoes – (punk rock, Christian rock, melodic hardcore) (1994–2004), (2007–2008), (2011–2012)
- Slingshot 57 – (rock) (1999–2007)
- Smalltown Poets – (rock) (1996–2004, 2010–present)
- Sonseed – (pop) (197?–1983)
- Souljunk – (hip hop) (1993–present)
- Southbound Fearing (Christian rock, Christian alternative rock, rock and roll, alternative rock, indie rock) (2006–present)
- Spasenie (Christian rock, pop rock) (1989–present)
- Split Level – (rock) (1986–2000)
- Spoken – (alternative rock, post-hardcore, rapcore) (1996–present)
- Spy Glass Blue – (post-punk, new wave, britpop) (1995–present)
- Staple – (rock, metalcore) (2000–2006, 2009–present)
- Starfield – (rock, CCM) (2000–present)
- Starflyer 59 – (indie rock, shoegazing) (1993–present)
- Stavesacre – (rock, hard rock, heavy metal) (1995–2010, 2014–present)
- Stellar Kart – (CCM pop punk alternative rock) (2002–present)
- Servant – (rock, CCM)
- Ryan Stevenson – (CCM), (2003–present)
- Randy Stonehill – (CCM, rock, folk rock) (1971–present)
- StorySide:B – (rock, CCM) (2003–2009)
- Strange Celebrity – (rock) (2003)
- Strange Occurrence – (post-grunge) (1995–2004)
- Stryken - (Christian Rock, glam metal) - (1986-1988)
- Stryper – (hard rock, heavy metal, glam metal) (1983–1993, 1999–2001, 2003–present)
- Subseven – (rock, post-hardcore, emo) (1999–2005, 2015–present)
- Sumerlin – (rock), (2009–present)
- Superchick – (rock) (1999–2013)
- Sweet Comfort Band – (rock) (1974–1984)
- The Swirling Eddies – (rock) (1988–present)
- Switchfoot – (alternative rock, power pop) (1996–present)

=== T ===
- Tait – (rock, CCM) (2001–2007)
- Steve Taylor – (new wave, Europop, rock, CCM) (1980–present)
- Tenth Avenue North – (CCM, Christian rock) (2000–2021, 2023–present)
- Ten Shekel Shirt – (Christian rock, rock) (2000–2008)
- Terminal – (rock, post-hardcore, emo) (1998–2006)
- Third Day – (CCM, worship, rock, southern rock, Christian rock) (1991–2018)
- This Beautiful Republic – (rock, hard rock, punk rock, CCM) (2004–2011)
- Three Crosses – (Christian rock, rock)
- The Throes – (rock) (1988–present)
- Thousand Foot Krutch – (Christian rock, hard rock, alternative rock, nu metal, rap rock) (1995–2017, 2024, TeeRawk 2025-present)
- thurane – (rock, CCM, contemporary worship music) (1994–present)
- TobyMac – (Christian hip hop, Christian rock) (2001–present)
- Chris Tomlin – (Christian rock) (1993–present)
- Tree63 – (Christian punk, punk rock) (1996–2009, 2014–present)
- Twothirtyeight – (indie rock) (1995–2003)

=== U ===
- Undercover – (rock, punk rock) (1980s–present)
- Underoath (Christian Metal) (early) (1997–present)
- Unspoken – (soul, pop-rock) (2003–present)

=== V ===
- Vector – (alternative rock, progressive rock, new wave) (1983–present)
- Velour 100 – (dream pop, indie rock) (1995?–2000)
- Verra Cruz – (blues rock, grunge rock, hard rock) (1996–present)
- The Violet Burning – (indie rock) (1990–present)
- VOTA – (rock) (1997–present)

=== W ===
- The W's – (ska, swing, swing revival) (1997–2000)
- The Waiting – (rock, folk rock, CCM) (1991–2003, 2010–present)
- Watashi Wa – (pop, rock) (2000–2004)
- Waterdeep – (folk rock, rock) (1995–present)
- Wavorly – (punk, rock) (2001–2012)
- The Way – (Jesus music, country rock) (1971–1976)
- The Way – (hardcore, rock) (2010–present)
- We as Human – (hard rock, alternative rock) (2006–2016)
- The Wedding – (rock, indie rock) (2003–present)
- Brian "Head" Welch – (Christian metal, hard rock, rock music, heavy metal music, nu metal, alternative metal) (2005–2012)
- Tauren Wells – (Christian rock) (2004–present)
- Matthew West – (CCM) (1997–present)
- We the Kingdom – (Christian rock) (2018–present)
- White Heart – (rock, pop rock, hard rock, CCM) (1982–1997)
- Whitecross – (hard rock, metal) (1985–present)
- Widdlesworth – (rock, indie rock) (2003–2006)
- Zach Williams – (Christian rock, country rock) (2007–present)
- Wolves at the Gate – (Christian metal, post-hardcore, alternative rock, metalcore, hard rock) (2008–present)
- Worth Dying For – (rock) (2005–present)
- Write This Down – (rock, post-hardcore) (2005–present)

=== X ===
- X-Sinner – (hard rock, rock, metal) (1988–2001, 2005–present)
- XXI – (rock, post-hardcore) (2010–present)

=== Y ===
- YFriday – (alternative rock, rock) (1994–2010)
- The Young Escape – (Christian pop, indie pop) 2016–present

=== Z ===
- ZOEgirl – (pop, rock) (1999–2006, 2008–2010, 2013–present)

== See also ==
- List of Christian country artists
- List of Christian hardcore bands
- List of Christian hip hop artists
- List of Christian metal artists
- List of Christian punk bands
- List of Christian ska bands
- Christian rock
- List of Christian worship music artists
