= Pillar discography =

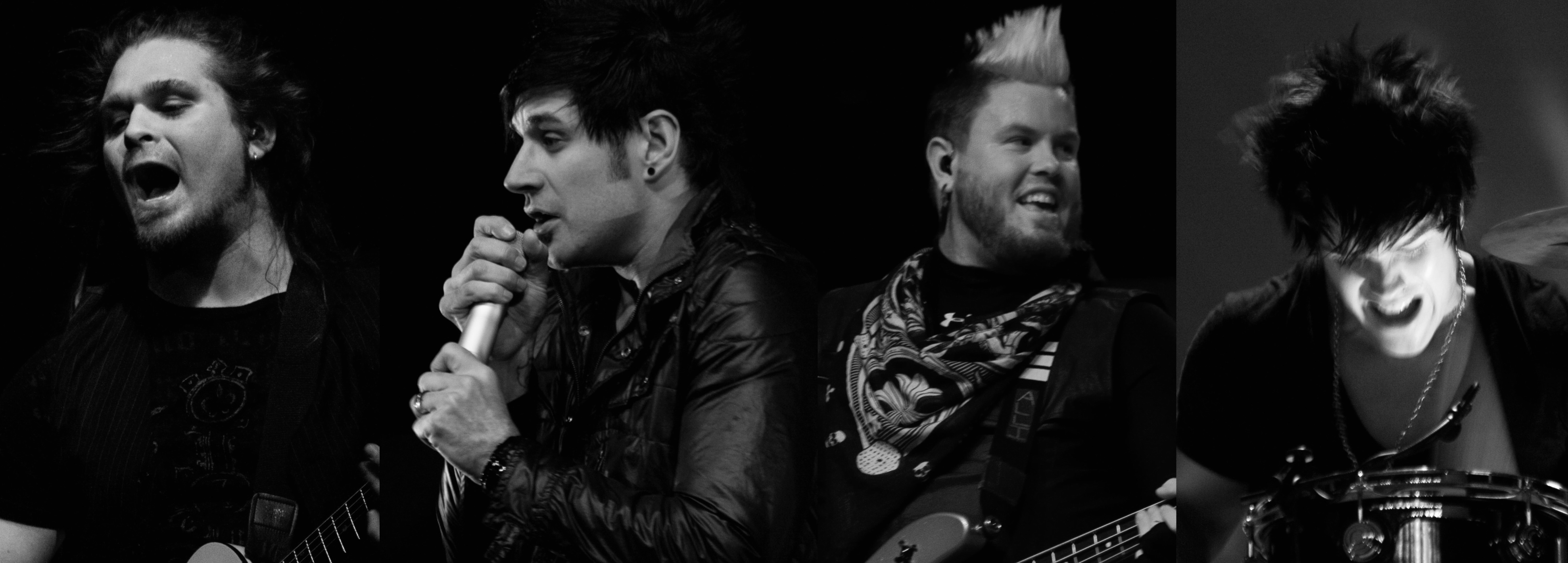
- Pillar in 2011
- Studio albums: 9
- Extended plays: 3
- Singles: 24

The discography of the Christian rock/metal band Pillar consists of 9 studio albums, 3 EPs, and 24 singles.

== Studio albums ==
Title	Album details	Peak chart positions		
Title	Album details	US	US Christ	US Indie
Metamorphosis	Released: March 25, 2000; Label: Shadrach Records; Format:	—	—	—
Original Superman	Released: Label: Shadrach Records; Format:	—	—	—
Above	Released: June 19, 2001; Label: Flicker; Format:	—	—	—
Fireproof	Released: May 21, 2002; Label: Flicker; Format:	139	9	—
Where Do We Go from Here	Released: June 15, 2004; Label: Flicker; Format: CD	74	3	—
The Reckoning	Released: October 3, 2006; Label: Flicker; Format:	70	6	3
For the Love of the Game	Released: February 26, 2008; Label: Essential Records; Format:	71	3	8
Confessions	Released: September 22, 2009; Label: Essential; Format:	89	4	—
One Love Revolution	Released: August 18, 2015; Label: Digitally Sound Records; Format:	—	8	—
"—" denotes a recording that did not chart or was not released in that territory.

== Extended plays ==
Year	Album details
2003	Broken Down: The EP: Released: December 2, 2003; Label: Flicker
2006	Nothing Comes for Free: Released: Label: Flicker
2007	Live at Blue Cats EP: Released: Label: Flicker

== Singles ==
Title	Year	Peak chart positions					Certifications	Album
Title	Year	US Main	US Active	US Christ CHR	US Christ AC	US Christ Rock	Certifications	Album
"Open Your Eyes"	2000	—	—	—	—	—		Above
"Original Superman"	2000	—	—	—	—	3		Above
"Live For Him"	2000	—	—	—	—	1		Above
"Fireproof'	2003	39	35	—	—	1		Fireproof
"Indivisible"	2003	—	—	—	—	12		Fireproof
"A Shame"	2003	—	—	—	—	3		Fireproof
"Echelon"	2003	—	—	—	—	1		Fireproof
"Further From Myself" (live acoustic)	2003	—	—	10	—	2		Broken Down: The EP
"Bring Me Down"	2004	26	23	—	—	1		Where Do We Go from Here
"Simply"	2004	—	—	—	—	—		Where Do We Go from Here
"Frontline"	2004	—	—	—	—	1	RIAA: Gold	Where Do We Go from Here
"Hypnotized"	2004	—	—	—	—	3		Where Do We Go from Here
"When Tomorrow Comes"	2006	—	—	—	—	3		The Reckoning
"Wherever the Wind Blows"	2006	—	—	17	21	—		The Reckoning
"For the Love Of the Game"	2006	—	—	—	—	1		The Reckoning
"Smiling Down"	2008	—	—	3	—	—		For the Love of the Game
"Turn It Up"	2008	—	—	—	—	—		For the Love of the Game
"Reckless Youth"	2008	—	—	—	—	2		For the Love of the Game
"State of Emergency"	2008	—	—	—	—	2		For the Love of the Game
"Fire On the Inside"	2008	—	—	—	—	—		For the Love of the Game
"Secrets and Regrets"	2009	—	—	—	—	—		Confessions
"Whatever It Takes"	2009	—	—	—	—	—		Confessions
"Shine"	2009	—	—	25	—	—		Confessions
"God Rest Ye Merry Gentlemen"	2012	—	—	—	—	—		Non-album singles
"Do You Hear What I Hear"	2020	—	—	—	—	—		Non-album singles
"Holy Name"	2025	—	—	—	—	—		Non-album singles
"—" denotes a recording that did not chart or was not released in that territory.
