= Lester Estelle II =

American drummer

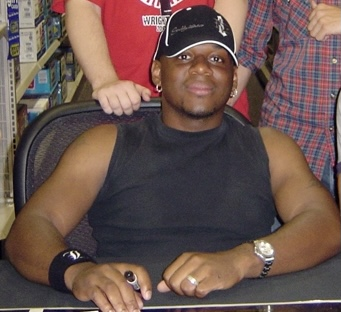
- Estelle in 2004

Background information
- Also known as: Lester
- Born: April 28, 1981 (age 45)
- Origin: Kansas City, Missouri, U.S.
- Occupation: Drummer
- Years active: 2002–present
- Website: lesterdrums.com

Lester Estelle II (born April 28, 1981) is an American drummer and backing vocalist for the Christian rock band Pillar, based in Tulsa, Oklahoma. He currently plays drums for singer-songwriter Kelly Clarkson and Jacob Whitesides. He was formerly a member of Stars Go Dim.

== Early life ==
Lester Estelle began to play drums at church with his father, and then began traveling in the eighth grade with the singer Troy Covey and band Seven. He started home schooling and traveling full-time during his second year.

He's played drums for several different bands such as: The Edwardsville Strings, Nu Creation, Lynda Randle, Entry No. 5, and other various artists around the Kansas City area. Lester still does gigs with Trump Dawgs and DL Sully when he's not on the road.

== Pillar ==
In 2002, Lester auditioned and began playing for Pillar. He was replacing Brad Noone who had left earlier that year. He has traveled all over the US with Pillar and visited several other countries. Lester has appeared on four Pillar albums: the re-release of Fireproof, Where Do We Go From Here, The Reckoning and For the Love of the Game. While the band was touring in support of The Reckoning, Lester began singing on the song "Tragedy" featured on the album and also began singing on other songs as well. In 2008, Lester decided to leave Pillar in pursuit of other interests including his work with his new band, "Stars Go Dim." Pillar's bassist, Michael Wittig, and Pillar's former backup touring guitarist, Joey Avalos, were also a part of the band; his departure affected Michael Wittig, who also left Pillar. Lester would ultimately rejoin the band in 2012.

== Stars Go Dim ==
Lester formed Stars Go Dim in 2007 with fellow Pillar Members Michael Wittig and Joey Avalos. Chris Cleveland is the group's lead Singer. Stars Go Dim is less metal based, unlike Pillar, and is more indie. Stars Go Dim released a self-titled EP in October 2008 and plan to release their debut record, Love Gone Mad, in August 2009. Now composed of Chris Cleveland, Michael Cleveland, Kyle Williams and Josh Roach, the band recently signed to Fervent Records (Word Entertainment). Stars Go Dim announced their major label released, self-titled debut in October 2015. Their first single is "You Are Loved".

== Kelly Clarkson ==
While trading gear with a friend, Estelle found out about the audition to be Kelly Clarkson's drummer. Lester was chosen to go on the road with Kelly and he toured with her in the summer of 2013. He has been playing with Clarkson since then, and he also plays in her house band on The Kelly Clarkson Show.

== Personal life ==
Lester married Lisa Byler in May, 2002. He has two daughters. He helps others with recording projects, advice, and drum lessons. Lester sometimes plays drums for Sunday morning worship services.
