= Indivisible =

Indivisible may refer to:

== Mathematics ==
- Method of indivisibles, the historical name of what is now known as Cavalieri's principle
- Absence of divisibility (ring theory)

== Arts ==
=== Films ===
- Indivisible (2016 film), a 2016 Italian film
- Indivisible (2018 film), a 2018 American film

=== Music ===
- Indivisible, album by Lungfish (band) 1997
- "Indivisible", song by Marie-Mai
- "Indivisible", song by Pillar from Fireproof (Pillar album)
- "Indivisible", song by Hatebreed
- "Indivisible", song by Lungfish (band)
- "Indivisible", song by The Dirtbombs
- "Indivisible", song by Plankeye
- "Indivisible", song by Crüxshadows
- "Indivisible", song by Betty Wright
- "Indivisible", song by Yellowjackets

=== Other media ===
- Indivisible, a novel by Fanny Howe (2003)
- Indivisible (video game)

== Other uses ==
- French ship Indivisible (1799)
- Indivisible movement, a progressive movement initiated as a reaction to the election of Donald Trump as US President in 2016
