= Stars Go Dim =

American pop rock band

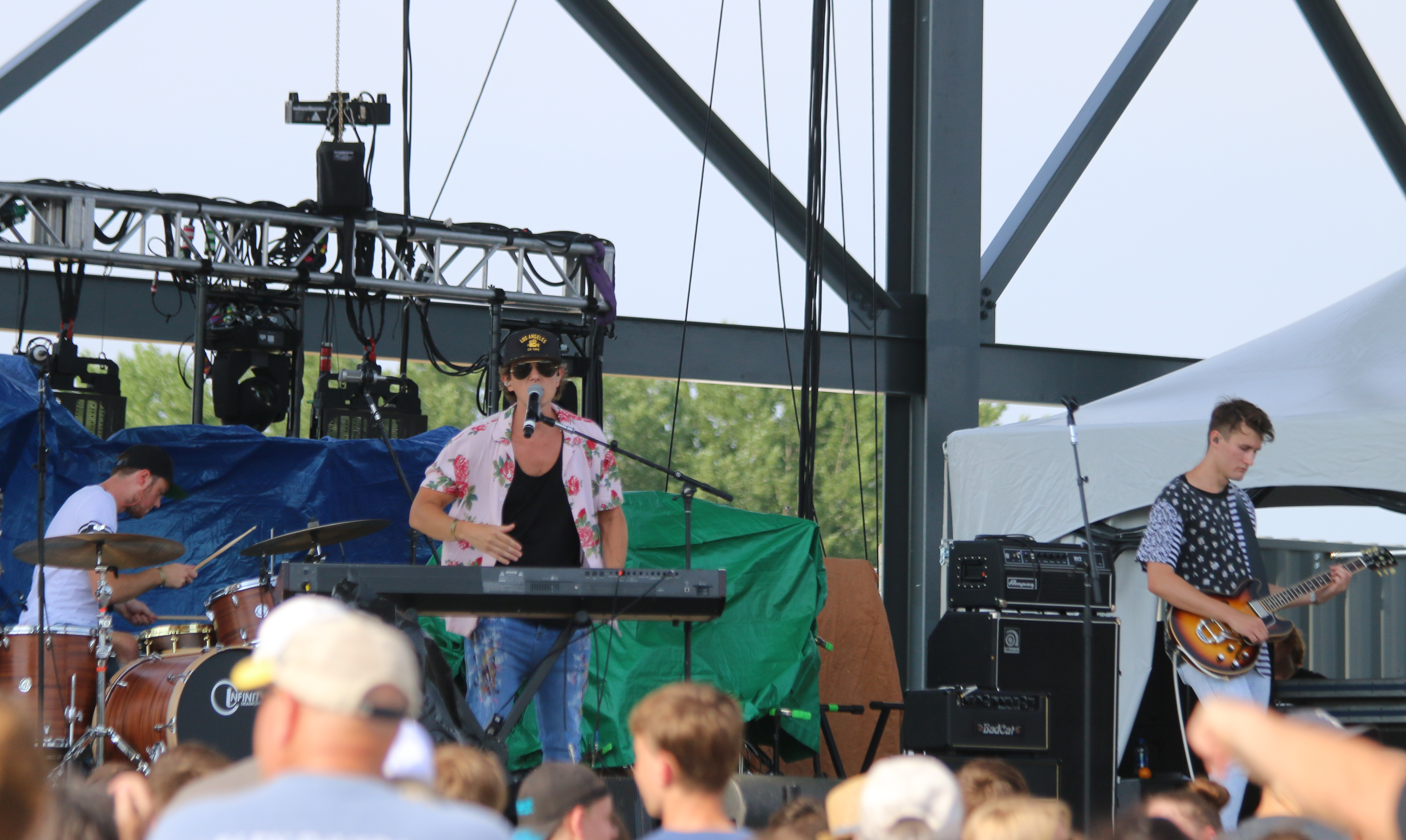
- Stars Go Dim performing in 2018

Background information
- Origin: Tulsa, Oklahoma, US
- Genres: Pop rock, Christian pop, Christian rock
- Years active: 2007–present
- Labels: curb Records, Word
- Spinoff of: Pillar
- Members: Chris Cleveland
- Past members: Joey Avalos; Lester Estelle II; Kevin Rogers; Luke Sullivant; Michael Wittig
- Website: starsgodim.com

Stars Go Dim (SGD) is a moniker for Christian singer Chris Cleveland. It was formerly an American pop rock group from Tulsa, Oklahoma, that formed in late 2007. Originally formed as a side project of the Christian rock band Pillar, it consisted of Cleveland (vocals, piano, and guitar), Joey Avalos (guitar), Michael Wittig (bass guitar), and Lester Estelle II (drums).

Cleveland signed to Fervent Records, a Word Records imprint, where he released his first major label studio album, Stars Go Dim, on October 30, 2015.

== History ==
Stars Go Dim began as a side project of the Christian rock band Pillar. Wittig and Estelle ultimately left Pillar to focus on Stars Go Dim in 2008. Avalos was also a touring member of Pillar before committing to the new band, and was previously in Justifide.

After forming in late 2007, the band finished recording and finally released their first self-titled EP in October 2008, which consists of five tracks: "Come Around", "Crazy", "Walk On", "Incredible", and, "Get Over It". Avalos stated that, "We just love to write songs that make you want to sing-along," and "it wasn't until I had written a twelve or so songs that we realized what we had. It's really this intricate mess of a love story that will unfold itself with our full-length album."

After forming and releasing their first EP, the band has had a moderate string of success. They have opened for Switchfoot, The Fray, Daughtry, and Graham Colton and have shared the stage with Paramore, The All-American Rejects, and The Roots. The band credits their success to their fans. Cleveland stated, "We really do have the best fans. Really. They were onboard with us when we just had a few videos of us writing the songs and no other music or bells and whistles to offer." Wittig also commented about the band's fans, saying, "The online communities have helped us get to know our fans better and vice versa. We're always coming up with new ways to connect."

To follow up their EP, the band released their first full-length album Love Gone Mad August 4, 2009.

Since 2010 Lester Estelle II is not an official band member, but he still does engineering and studio work for the band. In 2011 SGD released two singles, "Like I Mean It" and "Hesitate", and shot music videos for both. "Like I Mean It" music video is taken for rotation on mtvU in February 2011.

The band name now serves as a moniker for Cleveland, who signed to Fervent Records, a Word Records imprint, where he released his first major label studio album, Stars Go Dim, on October 30, 2015. His first single was "You Are Loved".

== Discography ==
=== Studio albums ===
Year	Album	Peak chart positions	
Year	Album	US Heat.	US Christ.
2009	Love Gone Mad: Released: August 4, 2009; Label: Independent; Formats: LP, CD, digital download	—	—
2015	Stars Go Dim: Released: October 30, 2015; Label: Fervent; Formats: CD, digital download	5	16
2019	Better: Released: May 17, 2019; Label: Word/Curb; Formats: CD, digital download	—	—
2022	Grace in the Wilderness: Released: April 29, 2022; Label: Word/Curb; Formats: CD, digital download	—	—
2025	Roses: Released: July 11, 2025; Label: Curb; Formats: CD, digital download	—	—

Love Gone Mad was released on August 4, 2009. The band also filmed a music video for the songs "Come Around" and "Get Over It". Discussing the album, Avalos once stated, "I probably wrote 20 songs in roughly two weeks and this is what came out of it."

=== EPs ===
- 2008 – Stars Go Dim
- 2011 – Between Here and Now
- 2018 – Better
- 2018 – Christmas Is Here

=== Singles ===
List of singles, with selected chart positions
Title	Year	Peak chart positions			Album
Title	Year	US Christ	US Christ Air.	US Christ AC	Album
"Hesitate"	2011	—	—	—	Between Here and Now
"Love This Girl"	2013	—	—	—	non-album single
"You Are Loved"	2016	7	1	2	Stars Go Dim
"Walking Like Giants"	2016	31	21	25	Stars Go Dim
"How Glorious The Love Of Heaven"	2016	27	9	4	Christmas is Here
"Doxology"	2017	—	36	—	Stars Go Dim
"Heaven On Earth"	2018	15	11	12	Better
"I Look To You" (featuring Social Club Misfits)	2018	—	—	—	Better
"Pieces"	2018	—	—	—	Better
"You Know Me Better"	2018	28	19	22	Better
"Christmas Is Here"	2018	26	11	13	Christmas Is Here
"It's Gonna Get Better"	2019	—	—	—	Better
"For Worse or Better"	2019	—	—	—	Better
"Invisible"	2019	—	—	—	Better
"Yes He Does"	2021	—	—	—	Grace in the Wilderness
"The First Noël"	2021	—	—	—	The First Noël
"Home" (with Hannah Ellis)	2021	—	—	—	non-album single
"This is Love"	2022	—	—	—	Grace in the Wilderness
"Prepare the Way"	2022	—	—	—	Grace in the Wilderness
"Authority (In the Name of Jesus)"	2023	—	—	—	Grace in the Wilderness
"Mama Don't Lie (Alright)"	2024	—	31	28	Roses
"Roses"	2025	—	—	—	Roses
"Discover God"	2025	—	—	—	Roses
"A Little Light"	2025	—	—	—	Roses
"G.I.R.L. (God In Real Life)"	2025	—	—	—	Roses

=== Other charted songs ===
List of other charted songs, with selected chart positions
Title	Year	Peak chart positions		Album
Title	Year	US Christ Air.	US Christ AC	Album
"Holy"	2026	17	18	Roses

== Band members ==
Current members

- Chris Cleveland lead vocals, piano, guitar (2007–present)

Former members

- Lester Estelle II keyboard, backing vocals (2007–2010) and drums (2012)
- Kevin Rogers acoustic guitar (2007)
- Luke Sullivant acoustic guitar (2007)
- Michael Wittig bass guitar (2012)

== Awards and nominations ==
In 2009, the band won the Channel One News Hear It Now Artist of the Year Award. That same year, the band won the "Absolute Best of Tulsa" award by Urban Tulsa Weekly for the Best Pop Rock Group August 8, 2009.

In 2016, Stars Go Dim were nominated for a Dove Award for 'New Artist of the Year'.
