= The Sensation of Sight =

2006 film

The Sensation of Sight poster

The Sensation of Sight is a feature film produced by independent film company Either/Or Films. Shot in 2005 and completed in 2006, it was written and directed by Aaron Wiederspahn and stars David Strathairn, Ian Somerhalder, Daniel Gillies, Jane Adams, Ann Cusack, Elisabeth Waterston, Joseph Mazzello, and Scott Wilson.

The Sensation of Sight made its world premiere at the San Sebastian International Film Festival in 2006 and was an official selection in 19 film festivals on five continents, including the Durban International Film Festival, where it won the festival's Best Cinematography award for cinematographer Christoph Lanzenberg. The Sensation of Sight has been shown in festivals in Brazil, China, Lithuania, and Poland, and made its U.S. premiere at the Denver Film Festival, followed by festival showings throughout the U.S.

In the summer of 2008, distributor Monterey Media gave the film a limited theatrical release, followed by a DVD release in the fall.

A fusion of dream/reality, this off-beat drama about man's search for meaning amidst the ache of despair chronicles Finn, a middle-aged English teacher, as he enters a mid-life crisis impelled by a recent tragedy. As he sets afoot selling encyclopedias to the town locals, encounters ensue and sales are made, but Finn's anxieties begin to consume him as he finds himself pursued by an unrelenting ghost. Circling through sleepless nights and desperate days, The Sensation of Sight intertwines lives of loneliness and disconnection, fatefully leading Finn toward an unexpected and sublime awakening.

The film was shot entirely in the town of Peterborough, New Hampshire.

== Review ==
The film scored moderate reviews with Rotten Tomatoes rating it at 50% from six reviews.
