= The Reckoning (Pillar album) =

Studio album by Pillar
- Released: October 3, 2006
- Genres: Christian rock; nu metal; hard rock
- Length: 47:46
- Label: Flicker
- Producer: Travis Wyrick

Pillar chronology
Nothing Comes for Free: EP (2006)	The Reckoning (2006)	For the Love of the Game (2008)

Alternative cover
- Special Edition Cover

The Reckoning is the fourth album from Christian rock band Pillar. It was released on October 3, 2006. Included on the new release are displays of the softer side of Pillar (with songs like "Angel In Disguise" and "Wherever the Wind Blows"), the pop side ("Sometimes") and the much heavier/screaming side ("Crossfire" and "Tragedy"). The album debuted at No. 70 on the Billboard 200.

The Reckoning received a Grammy Award nomination December 6, 2007 for Best Rock or Rap Gospel Album. This was the first Grammy nomination that Pillar has ever received.

== Critical reception ==
Professional ratings
Review scores
Source	Rating
AllMusic	3/5 stars
CCM Magazine	A−
Christian Broadcasting Network	4/5 stars
Christian Music Review	84%
Christianity Today	3/5 stars
Cross Rhythms	9/10 stars
Jesus Freak Hideout	4/5 stars
The Phantom Tollbooth	4/5 stars

The Reckoning garnered generally positive reception from eight music critics. At CCM Magazine, Doug Van Pelt graded the album an A−, stating that "it's hard not to notice the stellar production", and it comes "with its incredible bass, drum and guitar sounds." Jeremy Williams of Cross Rhythms rate the album nine out of ten, writing that the album "doesn't let up from there either, with crunching riffs and screamed lyrics that call for an all-out commitment as uncompromising as the music".

At Jesus Freak Hideout, Tim Harro rated the album four stars, saying that the album blends "instances of unoriginality with other moments of complexity, creativity, and also simplicity." Jennifer E. Jones of Christian Broadcasting Network rated the album four spins, affirming that "there is a enough good stuff to keep Pillar fans banging their heads." At The Phantom Tollbooth, Bert Saraco rated the album four tocks, noting how "Pillar shows us that they can produce punchy, driving, tricky but accessible music without having to sound like anyone else [...] Although those guitars did sound like Stryper."

Jay Heilman of Christian Music Review rated the album an 84-percent, stating how listeners will be "impressed with the turn and direction the band takes with the new material." At Christianity Today, Russ Breimeier rated the album three stars, commenting that the album "amounts to a Christian album that's capable of reaching the non-believer, though some of the songs are too abstract for their own good." Greg Prato of Allmusic rated the album three stars, highlighting that "there's not much differentiating Pillar from all the other similarly styled hopefuls."

== The Reckoning: Special Edition CD and DVD ==
This album was also released as a special edition with a bonus live concert DVD. The DVD also has band member interviews, behind the scenes footage, and more.

== Track listing ==
All tracks are written by Pillar (Rob Beckley, Lester Estelle, Noah Henson & Michael "Kalel" Wittig).

No.	Title	Length
1.	"Everything"	3:12
2.	"Awake"	3:21
3.	"When Tomorrow Comes"	3:40
4.	"The Reckoning"	3:18
5.	"Tragedy"	3:23
6.	"Last Goodbye"	3:53
7.	"Angel in Disguise"	5:02
8.	"Elysian"	1:48
9.	"Crossfire"	3:53
10.	"Resolution"	3:25
11.	"Sometimes"	3:46
12.	"Wherever the Wind Blows"	4:12
13.	"Chasing Shadows at Midnight"	4:53
Total length:		47:46

== Special edition DVD ==
Filmed at the Cornerstone Festival 2006

1. "Fireproof"
2. "Hypnotized"
3. "Simply"
4. "Everything"
5. "Tragedy"
6. "Underneath It All"
7. "Aftershock"
8. "Crossfire"
9. "Bring Me Down"
10. "Frontline"

== Commercial success ==
Best Buy reported that the CD sold 182% of its target in its first week out.

== Music videos ==
The band's only music video from this CD was for the song Everything.

The video opens with lead singer Rob Beckly driving an old tractor down a dirt road. Shortly after he is shown the tractor stops working. Disgusted Rob walks around the machine trying to fix it; but while he is doing this, guitarist Noah Henson drives up in an old car. Rob joins him in the car and they drive off, only to have the car break down also. Instead of trying to fix the car, they pick up two barrels and start walking away. While they are walking Kalel and Lester drive to them in an old monster truck. Rob and Noah hop in the back and the whole band ride off together. Then the third crash occurs and all four members start walking off in a line. It is then revealed that they were going to a show, the band enters the stage and they all play their instruments to finish the song.
