= Broken Down: The EP =

EP by Pillar
- Released: December 2, 2003
- Recorded: Early 2003
- Length: 26:45
- Label: Flicker
- Producer: Travis Wyrick

Pillar chronology
Fireproof (2003)	Broken Down: The EP (2003)	Where Do We Go from Here (2004)

Professional ratings
Review scores
Source	Rating
Jesus Freak Hideout	4/5 stars

Broken Down: The EP is the third release on Flicker Records by Christian rock band Pillar. It features a demo version of the hit song "Bring Me Down" as well as live acoustic versions and studio acoustic versions of songs on Pillar's second album, Fireproof.

== Track listing ==
1. "Further From Myself" (In Studio Acoustic) – 4:37
2. "A Shame" (Live Acoustic) – 4:53
3. "Light At My Feet" (Live Acoustic) – 3:55
4. "Further From Myself" (Live Acoustic) – 5:12
5. "Fireproof" (Live Acoustic) – 4:23
6. "Bring Me Down" (EP Mix) – 3:34

== Miscellaneous information ==
- "Bring Me Down" was included on MX Unleashed in February 2004 and on X 2004 on March 30, 2004.
- On the back of the physical EP, tracks 4 and 5 are switched.
