= Where Do We Go from Here (album) =

Studio album by Pillar
- Released: June 15, 2004
- Genres: Alternative rock, nu metal
- Length: 42:12
- Label: Flicker
- Producer: Travis Wyrick

Pillar chronology
Broken Down: The EP (2003)	Where Do We Go from Here (2004)	Nothing Comes for Free: EP (2006)

Alternative cover
- Limited Edition Cover

Singles from Where Do We Go From Here
- 1. "Bring Me Down" Released: 2004; 2. "Simply" Released: 2004; 3. "Frontline" Released: 2004; 4. "Hypnotized" Released: 2004

Where Do We Go from Here is the third album by Christian rock band Pillar. The song "Bring Me Down" was featured on the 2005 Major League Baseball video game, MLB 2006, as well as the offroad racing game MX vs. ATV Unleashed. The songs "Frontline" and "Bring Me Down" reached No. 1 on the Christian rock charts., with the former of the two being certified gold by the RIAA on July 31, 2020. The album debuted at No. 74 on the Billboard 200.

== Critical reception ==
Professional ratings
Review scores
Source	Rating
About.com	3/5 stars
AllMusic	3/5 stars
CCM Magazine	A
Christianity Today	2.5/5 stars
Cross Rhythms	8/10 stars
Jesus Freak Hideout	4/5 stars
The Phantom Tollbooth	3.5/5 stars

Where Do We Go from Here garnered generally positive reception from seven music critics. At CCM Magazine, David Jenison graded the album an A, writing that the band on the album "ups the ante with songs profoundly richer in attitude and ambition." Haydon Spenceley of Cross Rhythms rated the album an eight out of ten, stating that it is "An album to investigate" At Jesus Freak Hideout, Josh Taylor rated the album four stars, calling the album "definitely worth a listen." Len Nash of The Phantom Tollbooth rated the album three-and-a-half tocks, affirming that the album "picks up ground, and for its total quality, including the first three songs and strong final tracks".

At Christianity Today, Andree Farias rated the album two-and-a-half stars, saying that "While Christian disc jockeys and teens are sure to eat this up, it's uncertain how long the band will be able to make relevant music for those not attuned with Christian rock." Kim Jones of About.com rated the album three stars, stating that the release "had some high spots, some low spots and a few in-betweens." At Allmusic, Johnny Loftus rated the album three stars, writing that "It's another quality effort from Pillar, who probably deserve more exposure, as they can hang sonically with any of their mainstream post-grunge peers."

== Track listing ==
All tracks are written by Pillar.

No.	Title	Length
1.	"Hypnotized"	3:50
2.	"Bring Me Down"	3:30
3.	"Holding On"	3:21
4.	"Let It Out"	3:20
5.	"Simply"	4:14
6.	"Rewind"	3:45
7.	"Frontline"	3:10
8.	"Underneath It All"	3:11
9.	"Dirty Little Secret"	2:18
10.	"Staring Back"	2:51
11.	"One Thing (the song "One Thing" ends at 3:55. An instrumental hidden track begins at 3:58.)"	5:28
12.	"Aftershock"	3:09
Total length:		42:12

Limited Edition
No.	Title	Length
13.	"Sunday Bloody Sunday" (U2 Cover)"
14.	"Bring Me Down (Underground Mix)"

- Bonus DVD contains footage of the making of the album, plus photos of the band and other extra features.

== Credits ==
- Rob Beckley - vocals
- Noah Henson - guitars
- Michael Wittig - bass
- Lester Estelle - drums

Production

- Travis Wyrick - producer, engineering
- Chris Lord-Alge - mixing
- Mike Dearing - engineering
- Bob Herdman - executive producer
- Ace Eversole - engineering
- George Marino - mastering

Additional musicians

- Keith Wallen - backing vocals
- Mike Dearing - percussion

== Awards and certifications ==
On 2005, the album was nominated for a Dove Award for Rock Album of the Year at the 36th GMA Dove Awards. The song "Frontline" was certified gold by the RIAA in July 2020.
