= Stars Go Dim (album) =

Studio album by Stars Go Dim
- Released: October 30, 2015
- Recorded: 2015
- Studios: The Brown Owl, Nashville, Tennessee
- Genres: Pop rock, Christian pop, Christian rock
- Length: 52:56
- Labels: Fervent, Word
- Producers: Casey Brown, Kendal Osborne, Josh Roach, Jeff Sojka, Tedd T., Josh Zegan

Stars Go Dim is the first studio album from Stars Go Dim. Fervent Records alongside Word Records released the album on October 30, 2015. They worked with Casey Brown, Kendal Osborne, Josh Roach, Jeff Sojka, Tedd T., and Josh Zegan, in the production of this album.

== Critical reception ==
Professional ratings
Review scores
Source	Rating
365 Days of Inspiring Media	4.5/5 stars
CCM Magazine	3.5/5 stars
The Christian Beat	4.5/5 stars
CM Addict	3/5 stars
Jesus Freak Hideout	2.5/5 stars 1.5/5 stars
New Release Today	3.5/5 stars
Worship Leader	4.5/5 stars

Indicating in a three and a half star review by CCM Magazine, Andy Argyrakis describes, "The group’s self-titled offering juggles between soulful pop, modern rock and contemporary praise, often employing massive harmonies and arena-worthy production. It’s a super slick, Christian living-focused affair that’s fairly infectious at every turn, even if some of the lyrics and arrangements lean towards the generic side." Amanda Furbeck, allotting the album four and a half stars from Worship Leader, responds, "Musically, Stars Go Dim is beautifully mastered, creating just the right balance of stand-out vocals that are well supported by the creative arrangements of SGD's pop-rock band."

Mikayla Shriver, giving the album three and a half stars for New Release Today, writes, "Their debut album is a polished, spiritual, yet fun pop album." Awarding the album four and a half stars at 365 Days of Inspiring Media, states, "Each of the 14 tracks are unique, and each of them are a reminder of the hope we have in Christ Jesus our Lord!" Rating the album a four and a half stars from The Christian Beat, Chris Major says, "Without a doubt, Stars Go Dim has proven their creativity and sincerity with their debut collection." Allocating the album three stars at CM Addict, Michael Tackett says, "The rest of the record is very similar lyrically and musically that each song starts to blend in a little too much."

Signaling in a two and a half star review from Jesus Freak Hideout, Christopher Smith cautions, "At its worst, this self-titled album is background filler and at its best, it is catchy formulaic pop...but overall this album tries too hard to produce a sound pulled off much better by other artists, even their own label mates for King & Country." Scott Fryberger, assigning the album one and a half stars at Jesus Freak Hideout, criticizes, " But at the end of the day, Stars Go Dim is just another album that has come into my ears that I just want to flush out."

== Track listing ==
All tracks written by Chris Cleveland and others, except track 1.

No.	Title	Writer(s)	Length
1.	"Doxology"	Thomas Ken	4:38
2.	"Alive in You"	Chris Cleveland, Jeff Pardo, Kyle Williams	3:48
3.	"You Are Loved"	Cleveland, Jeff Sojka, Williams, Josh Zegan	3:26
4.	"All I Have"	Casey Brown, Cleveland, Antjuan Robinson, Williams	4:25
5.	"Walking like Giants"	Brown, Cleveland, Josh Roach, Robinson, Williams	3:14
6.	"If It's Amazing Grace"	Cleveland, Michael Farren, Seth Mosley	4:05
7.	"Love That Won't Let Go"	Brown, Cleveland, Jonathan Smith	3:42
8.	"See You"	Cleveland, Sojka, Williams, Zegan	4:01
9.	"Stars"	Cleveland, Mia Fieldes, Mosley, Williams	3:10
10.	"24/7"	Cleveland, Fieldes, Mosley	3:42
11.	"Where You Are"	Cleveland, Sojka, Williams, Zegan	3:24
12.	"Morning Star"	Brown, Cleveland, Williams	3:45
13.	"Never Burn Out"	Cleveland, Michael Cleveland, Justin Ebach, Roach, Robinson, Williams	3:54
14.	"Here"	Cleveland, Pardo	3:42
Total length:			52:56

== Personnel ==
Credits are adapted from AllMusic.

- Chris Cleveland – lead vocals, background vocals, piano, organ
- Kyle Williams – background vocals, acoustic guitar, electric guitar, ukulele
- Casey Brown – background vocals, acoustic guitar, keyboards, synthesizer, drums, recording
- Antjuan Robinson – background vocals, bass
- Josh Roach – background vocals, drums, percussion
- Spencer Nohe – background vocals
- Parker Nohe – background vocals
- Natalie Brown – background vocals
- Kendal Osborne – acoustic guitar, electric guitar, synthesizer, programming, recording
- Hank Bentley – acoustic guitar, electric guitar, bouzouki, keyboards, synthesizer, programming, percussion, drums, drum programming
- Mark Campbell – electric guitar, programming
- Stepan Leiweke – electric guitar
- Benjamin Backus – piano, programming, cello
- Jeff Sojka – keyboards, programming, bass, drums, recording, mixing
- Tedd T. – programming, percussion
- Cara Fox – cello
- Mark Zellmer – recording
- Jared Fox – recording
- Sean Moffitt – mixing
- Warren David – mixing

== Chart performance ==
Chart (2016)	Peak position
US Top Christian Albums (Billboard)	16
US Heatseekers Albums (Billboard)	5
