= These Hands (EP) =

EP by Hearts Like Lions
- Released: December 2, 2014
- Genre: Christian alternative rock, indie rock
- Length: 22:27
- Label: Tooth & Nail

These Hands is the first extended play from Hearts Like Lions. Tooth & Nail Records released the EP on December 2, 2014.

== Critical reception ==
Professional ratings
Review scores
Source	Rating
Already Heard	4/5 stars
Alt Rock Live	9/10
Cross Rhythms	7/10 squares
Indie Vision Music	4/5 stars
Jesus Freak Hideout	4/5 stars 3.5/5 stars
Pure Grain Audio	7/10

Awarding the EP four stars at Jesus Freak Hideout, John Choquette states, "These Hands is almost painfully short, but if it's any indication, Ramos and company are certainly up to the challenge." Michael Weaver, giving the EP three and a half stars for Jesus Freak Hideout, says, "These Hands, sounds exactly like what you'd expect from a good Tooth and Nail band." Tony Cummings, rating the EP a seven out of ten at Cross Rhythms, describes, "All six tracks are well produced with good interplay between the instruments".

Rating the EP a seven out of ten from Pure Grain Audio, Daniella Kohan writes, "These Hands is a well-written, upbeat, and fun alt-rock compilation that is short and quite sweet." Liz Groth, indicating in a nine out of ten review by Alt Rock Live, describes, "Complete with intricate guitar work, expressive vocals, and contemplative lyrics, 'These Hands' maintains an overall positive outlook despite addressing serious issues such as the human condition, faith, and growing older."

Signaling in a four star review for from Indie Vision Music, Ian Zandi responds, "HLL is far more outgoing with their lyrics than most ambiguous bands on the scene. They are passionate and skilled musicians that are still growing. Though some of the songs mold together on this EP, perhaps a full-length will showcase some more diversity." Rob Mair, specifying in a four star review at Already Heard, replies, "'These Hands' certainly marks Hearts Like Lions out as ones to watch. Polished but with enough of an edge to remain interesting, it’s an assured EP which leaves you both wanting more and eager to discover where these Lions will go next."

== Track listing ==
These Hands track listing
No.	Title	Length
1.	"Wake Up"	4:00
2.	"Stranger"	3:44
3.	"Trust Me"	3:16
4.	"Man of Dust"	3:46
5.	"Say My Name"	3:38
6.	"These Hands"	4:03
Total length:		22:27
