= Dear Ephesus =

American Christian alternative rock band

Dear Ephesus was an American Christian alternative rock band from Orlando, Florida. They were voted third-favorite new group of 1997 by HM Magazine readers, and went on to release two albums. The band broke up at the end of the 1990s.

Several members re-formed as Tenderfoot, hoping to fill their Bulletproof Records contract and reach the secular market. They had one release under this name, The Devil And Rock And Roll, in 2000.

== Band members ==
- Aaron Wiederspahn – vocals
- Brett Levsen – guitar
- Ed Lamoso – guitar
- Louis DeFabrizio – bass
- Jeff Irizarry – drums

== Discography ==
- A View of Epic Proportions EP (1995, Review: HM Magazine, Cross Rhythms)
- The Consolation of Pianissimo (1997, Reviews: The Phantom Tollbooth , Cross Rhythms)
- The Absent Sounds of Me (1998, Reviews: HM Magazine, The Phantom Tollbooth)

== Trivia ==
- The hidden track on the album The Consolation Of Pianissimo is not titled Sutton Blaze (as is often cited), but actually Sutton Place, a reference to an apartment complex where a friend lived and band members often hung out.
- Aaron Weiderspahn is now a writer and director. His first film is The Sensation of Sight (2006), starring David Strathairn and Ian Somerhalder from Lost.
- Brett Levsen and Edgardo Lamoso are currently playing in The Vanity Plan.
- Louis Defabrizio currently fronts the band Gasoline Heart along with Jeff Irizarry and John Forston from Squad 5–0.
