= Palavrantiga =

Brazilian Christian rock band

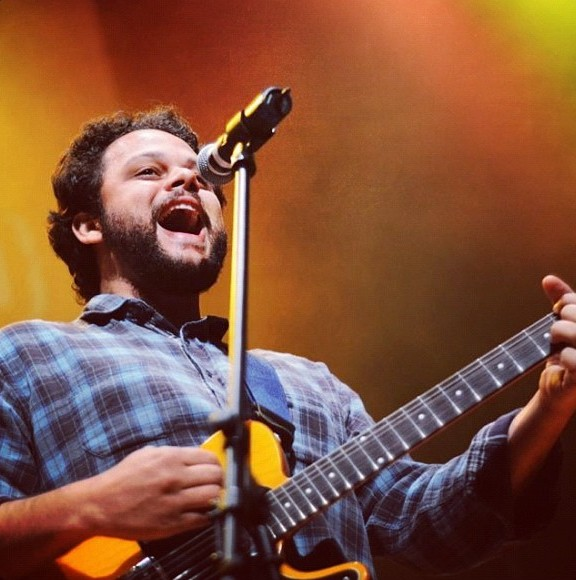
- Marcos Almeida.

Background information
- Origin: Belo Horizonte, Brazil; Curitiba, Brazil
- Genres: Christian rock
- Years active: 2008 – present
- Spinoff of: Heloisa Rosa
- Members: Marcos Almeida; Josias Alexandre; Lucas Fonseca; Felipe Vieira
- Website: www.palavrantiga.com

Palavrantiga is a Christian rock band formed in 2004 when its members were the band of Heloisa Rosa. With it, members of the quartet released three albums. In 2008 they released their first album the group, Vol.1 EP Palavrantiga.

In 2011, the band received the first nomination Troféu Promessas in Revelation category. Soon the project will be released Uma Noite em Recife (One Night in Recife), recorded in 2011 and released on CD and DVD.

== Band members ==
- Marcos Almeida (lead vocals, guitar, keyboard)
- Lucas Fonseca (drums)
- Felipe Vieira (bass)
- Josias Alexandre (guitar)

== Discography ==
=== Studio albums ===
- 2008: Palavrantiga - Volume 1
- 2010: Esperar é Caminhar
- 2012: Sobre o Mesmo Chão

=== Live albums ===
- 2012: Uma Noite em Recife
