= The Way (punk rock band) =

- Origin: Oxnard, California; Santa Paula, California
- Genres: Christian hardcore, Christian rock, Christian alternative rock, hardcore punk, pop punk, punk rock
- Years active: 2010–present
- Labels: Thumper Punk
- Members: Johnny; Manny; Tank; Harry; Ryan
- Website: facebook.com/thewaypunx805

The Way is an American Christian hardcore and Christian rock band, and they primarily play hardcore punk, punk rock, and alternative rock. They come from the cities of Oxnard, California and Santa Paula, California. The band started making music in 2010, and their members are lead vocalist, Johnny, lead guitarist and background vocalist, Manny, bassist, Tank, rhythm guitarist and background vocalist, Harry, and drummer, Ryan. The band have released one extended play, Helpless but Not Hopeless, in 2011, with Thumper Punk Records. Their first studio album, The Fight Is Ours, was released in 2010 by Thumper Punk Records. The subsequent studio album, I Keep Falling, was released by Thumper Punk Records, in 2013.

== Background ==
The Way is a Christian hardcore and Christian rock band from the cities of Oxnard, California and Santa Paula, California. Their members are lead vocalist, Johnny, lead guitarist and background vocalist, Manny, bassist, Tank, rhythm guitarist and background vocalist, Harry, and drummer and background vocalist, Ryan.

== Music history ==
The band commenced as a musical entity in 2010 with their release, The Fight Is Ours, a studio album, that was released by Thumper Punk Records on June 1, 2010. They released, an extended play, Helpless but Not Hopeless, on December 8, 2011, with Thumper Punk Records. Their subsequent studio album, I Keep Falling, was released on December 10, 2013 by Thumper Punk Records.

== Members ==
Current members

- Johnny - lead vocals
- Manny - lead guitar, background vocals
- Tank - bass
- Harry - rhythm guitar, background vocals
- Ryan - drums

== Discography ==
Studio albums

- The Fight Is Ours (June 1, 2010, Thumper Punk)
- I Keep Falling (December 10, 2013, Thumper Punk)

EPs

- Helpless but Not Hopeless (December 8, 2011, Thumper Punk)
