= Reform the Resistance =

American Christian metal/rock band

- Origin: Phoenix, Arizona; Nashville, Tennessee
- Genres: Christian rock, Christian metal, rap rock
- Years active: 2007–present
- Labels: WuLi, Blood and Ink
- Members: Jason Moncivaiz; Sambo Moncivaiz; Ryan Dugger
- Website: reformtheresistance.com

Reform the Resistance is an American Christian metal and Christian rock band, and they primarily play alternative metal, nu metal, post-rock, and rap rock. They come from both Phoenix, Arizona and Nashville, Tennessee. The band started making music, in 2007, with lead vocalist and guitarist, Jason Moncivaiz, bassist and background vocalist, Sambo Moncivaiz, and drummer and background vocalist, Ryan Dugger. Their first full-length studio album, The Truth Is Dangerous, was released in 2011 by WuLi Records.

== Background ==
Reform the Resistance is a Christian metal and Christian rock band from both Phoenix, Arizona and Nashville, Tennessee. The band formed in 2007, with members, lead vocalist and guitarist, Jason Moncivaiz, bassist and background vocalist, Sambo Moncivaiz, and drummer and background vocalist, Ryan Dugger. The two Moncivaiz brothers were in the band, Justifide.

== Music history ==
The band commenced as a musical entity in 2007, with their release, The Truth Is Dangerous, a studio album, that was released by WuLi Records, on April 26, 2011. On July 7, 2015 the band released the album DOS.

== Members ==
Current

- Jason Moncivaiz – lead vocals, guitar
- Sambo Moncivaiz – bass, background vocals
- Ryan Dugger – drums, background vocals

== Discography ==
Studio albums

- And It Begins (2008)
- The Truth Is Dangerous (April 26, 2011, Blood & Ink Records)
- Dos (July 7, 2015)
