= The Skies Revolt =

American Christian rock band

- Origin: Grand Rapids, Michigan
- Genres: post-hardcore, indie rock
- Years active: 2004–present
- Labels: Robotic
- Members: Dave Prindle; Jarred Irby
- Website: facebook.com/theskiesrevolt

The Skies Revolt is an American Post-hardcore band, and they primarily play indie rock. They come from Grand Rapids, Michigan. The band started making music in 2004. They released, Some Kind of Cosmonaut, a studio album, in 2012.

== Background ==
The Skies Revolt is a Post-hardcore band from Grand Rapids, Michigan. Their members are vocalist and guitarist, Dave Prindle, vocalist and bassist, Jarred Irby, vocalist and guitarist, Bobby Dowell, and vocalist and drummer, Eli DenBesten.

== Music history ==
The band commenced as a musical entity in 2004 and released their first album, Some Sort of War in 2006. Their latest album, Some Kind of Cosmonaut, was released on January 10, 2012, with Robotic Records.

== Members ==
Current members

- Dave Prindle - vocals, guitar
- Jarred Irby - vocals, guitar, bass, drums, psychologist, black guy

Past members

- Adam Murphy - vocals, guitar, drums
- Nate Donahue - vocals, guitar
- Nathan "Pockets" Smith - vocals, drums, eye-candy
- David "Rusty" Vining Jr - vocals, bass
- Brett Hull - vocals, drums, slapshots
- Steve Ryan - vocals, bass
- Bobby Dowell - vocals, guitar
- Eli DenBesten - vocals, drums

== Discography ==
Albums

- Some Kind of Cosmonaut (January 10, 2012, Robotic)
- Plastic Revolution (June 2010)
- Is Alive and Well (April 2008)
- Kamikaze Romantic Thoughts (November 2007)
- Some Sort of War (December 2006)
