= Candlefuse =

American Christian alternative rock band

- Origin: Rainsville, Alabama
- Genres: Christian alternative rock, hard rock
- Years active: 1999–present
- Label: Infinity
- Members: Ben Honeycutt; Drew Garrett; Steven Howell; Brian Hechler
- Past members: J.W. Woodard; Bryant Davis

Candlefuse are an American Christian alternative rock band from Rainsville, Alabama, where the group started making music in 1999. Their first release, Candlefuse, an extended play, was released in 2005. They have also released a studio album, Never Go Unheard, in 2006.

== Background ==
The group started in 1999, in Rainsville, Alabama, where they are vocalist, Ben Honeycutt, guitarist, Drew Garrett, bassist, Steven Howell, and drummer, Brian Hechler. Their name comes from the bible verses, Matthew 5:14 and Psalm 133:1, in order to portray and reflect a solidarity of light to a darkened world.

== Music history ==
They released an independently-made extended play, Candlefuse, in 2005. Their first studio album, Never Go Unheard, was released on October 17, 2006, from Infinity Records.

== Members ==
- Ben Honeycutt – vocals
- Drew Garrett – guitar
- Steven Howell - bass (2003-2006)
- J.W. Woodard – bass (2006-2010)
- Brian Hechler – drums (1999-2006)
- Bryant Davis - drums (2006-2007)

== Discography ==
Studio albums

- Never Go Unheard (October 17, 2006, Infinity)
