= Strange Occurrence =

American post-grunge band

Background information
- Origin: Seattle, Washington, U.S.
- Genre: Post-grunge
- Years active: 1995–2004
- Label: Steelroots
- Members: TJ Harris; Eric Vickers; Joe Wiles; Mikey Middleton

Strange Occurrence is an American post-grunge band formed in 1995 in Seattle, Washington. Their internationally distributed album: Another Day to Start Again (Steelroots/Flicker, 2002) was received well by critics and radio. Before signing with Steelroots Records, they had been voted as one of the top 25 independent bands of 2001 by readers of 7 Ball Magazine. They are most notable for their single Reach which peaked at No. 6 on Radio & Records CR chart. Strange Occurrence disbanded in 2004.

== Members ==
- TJ Harris – vocals
- Eric Vickers – bass
- Joe Wiles – guitar
- Mike Middleton – drums

== Past members ==
- Paul McGuire – guitar (2002–2003)
- Gabe Roberts – guitar (2000–2001)
- Zack Phillips – drums (1995–2001)
- Derek Olson – vocals (1998–2000)
- Dallas Olson – guitar (1998–2000)
- Craig Wickstrom – vocals, guitar (1997–1998)
- Josh Muehlendorf – vocals, guitar (1996–1997)
- Reid Smith – guitar (1996)
- Chris Wiles – vocals (1994–1996)

== Discography ==
- Another Day to Start Again – Independent EP (2000)
- Another Day to Start Again – Steelroots full-length (2002)
- The Acoustic Sessions – Steelroots (2003)

=== Compilations ===
- 31 Flavors: Sample the Flavor (1997)
- Simply Groovy New Music Sampler (2002)
- What Are You Listening To?: Hard Rock and Nu-Metal (2002)
