= Nothing Comes for Free =

EP by Pillar
- Released: 2006
- Genre: Hard rock, Christian rock
- Length: 28:08
- Label: Flicker
- Producer: Travis Wyrick

Pillar chronology
Where Do We Go from Here (2004)	Nothing Comes for Free (2006)	The Reckoning (2006)

Professional ratings
Review scores
Source	Rating
Jesus Freak Hideout	4.5/5 stars

Nothing Comes for Free is an EP released by the Christian rock band Pillar. It features 3 new songs (including a different mix of "Everything") and 4 live tracks recorded at Blue Cats in Knoxville, Tennessee. The other 2 new songs, "Our Escape" and "Dangerous" are not available on The Reckoning. The EP was only available at live shows and at their webstore. A limited number of 10,000 copies were created.

== Track listing ==
1. "Everything (EP Mix)" – 3:12
2. "Our Escape" (previously unreleased) – 3:39
3. "Dangerous" (previously unreleased) – 3:20
4. "Fireproof" (Live @ Blue Cats) – 4:50
5. "Simply" (Live @ Blue Cats) – 4:34
6. "Everything" (Live @ Blue Cats) – 3:20
7. "Frontline" (Live @ Blue Cats) – 5:13
