= 39 Stripes =

American Christian rock band

- Origin: Tampa, Florida
- Genres: Christian rock, Christian alternative rock, hard rock
- Years active: 1997–present
- Label: Hollar Records
- Members: Steve Henderlong; Ray Schurr; Josh Daugherty
- Past members: Todd Lord; Roger Lord; Cliff Umphlett; Joe Costa; Jaime Lloyd; John Kapaniris; Mike Chakar; Mike Wilson
- Website: 39stripes.com

39 Stripes is an American Christian rock band formed in Tampa, Florida in 1997 by guitarist Steve Henderlong. They primarily play a style of alternative rock and hard rock music. The band released, Beyond Broken, a studio album, in 2010, with Hollar Records.

== Background ==
39 Stripes is a Christian rock band from Tampa, Florida, founded in 1997. Its members are guitarist/vocalist, Steve Henderlong, bassist Ray Schurr, and drummer/vocalist Josh Daugherty. Having released three well-received independent projects, 39 Stripes (1997), Saving Me A Place EP (2002), Burn EP (2005), and Beyond Broken from Hollar Records (2010), 39 Stripes has toured extensively, self-booking hundreds of shows and sharing the stage with top artists including Jars of Clay, newsboys, Stryper, and Flyleaf. In addition to appearing on Petra's 2005 “Farewell Tour,” 39 Stripes has showcased its talents at major festivals Atlanta Fest and Ichthus, while performing on behalf of Gibson Guitars at the summer 2005 NAMM Show. The band has been covered by major media outlets, Billboard, Guitar World, Vintage Guitar, and the St. Petersburg Times while receiving endorsements from major companies like PRS Guitars, Suhr Guitars & Amplification, KSR Amplification, Eminence Speakers, Crush Drums, Seymour Duncan, GHS Strings, Floyd Rose, George L's Cables, Fishman, TonePros, Rockett Pedals, Hipshot, Jim Dunlop, and Express and Pop-Icon clothing.

== Music history ==
Beyond Broken, a studio album and video, was released on October 26, 2010, by Hollar Records.

== Members ==
Current members

- Steve Henderlong - guitar/vocals
- Ray Schurr - bass
- Josh Daugherty - drums/vocals

== Discography ==
Studio albums

- 39 Stripes (1997, 39 Stripes Music)
- Saving Me A Place (2002, 39 Stripes Music)
- Burn (2005, 39 Stripes Music)
- Beyond Broken (October 26, 2010, Hollar Records)

== Books ==
On August 4, 2012, the band was featured as key characters in the Christian political thriller "In God We Trust", a novel by Lenora S. Gauthier. Even though the novel was fiction, the band members portrayed themselves, including Steve Henderlong who doubled as a spy and as the guitarist for 39 Stripes.
