= Difference United =

American indie Christian pop-rock band

- Origin: Nashville, Tennessee
- Genres: Christian rock, pop, electronic
- Years active: 2006–present
- Label: Indie
- Members: Aaron Miller, Rebecca Wade
- Website: differenceunited.com

Difference United is an indie Christian pop-rock band from Nashville, Tennessee. The band was founded in 2006 by Aaron Miller, the principal composer and keyboard player and features Rebecca Wade as lead vocalist. The group released its debut album entitled Dream Again in 2008, and its second album release New Day in 2014.

The band was a featured artist in the May 2014 edition of Indie Artist Watch published by the Christian music website New Release Tuesday.

== Members ==
- Rebecca Wade, lead singer (2013–present)
- Aaron Miller, composer, keyboards, background vocals

== Albums ==
- Dream Again (2008)
- New Day (2014)

== Singles ==
The group's first radio single "Dream Again" was released to Christian Rock Radio in 2008. It has since been followed by two singles titled "More Than Ever" and "Raindrops". Both singles have also gained international attention in China, Romania, India, Canada, and France in addition to domestic attention in the U.S.

Difference United has released "I Know", the first single off their most recent album New Day, to U.S. radio. The song is being distributed through CRW Radio Promotions based in Colorado. The song was produced by veteran Nashville producer Jeff Pitzer.

== Touring ==
Difference United has made several tours in different countries and continents, including two tours in Europe in 2006, two tours in India in 2007 and 2008, and two tours in China in 2008 and 2009.
