= Éowyn (musician) =

American singer

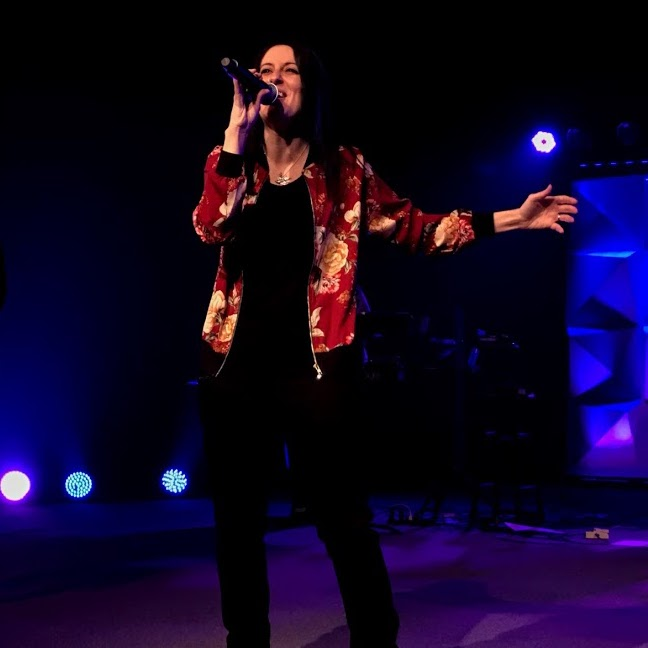
- Eowyn leading worship at Expectation Church in 2017

Background information
- Born: Rebecca Éowyn Denee Krueger; March 1, 1979 (age 47)
- Origin: Nashville, Tennessee, United States
- Genres: Christian alternative rock; electronica; alternative rock
- Years active: 1999–2008; 2011–present
- Website: www.eowynmusic.com

Rebecca Éowyn Denee Krueger (born March 1, 1979), known mononymously as Éowyn, is a Christian alternative rock artist from Nashville, Tennessee, who began performing in 1999.

A recording artist with an industrial hard rock style and Gothic influences to back up her theatrical stage presence, Éowyn has had radio airplay in over 200 cities and has had two Top Twenty National Christian rock singles on the R&R charts.

Éowyn has extensive touring experience playing in venues of all sizes, including festivals, bars, youth gatherings and arenas. She has shared the stage with some of the biggest artists in the Christian music industry including Krystal Meyers, Petra, Staple, Tait and others. She has toured throughout the U.S. from California to Florida.

== Early life ==
Éowyn was born on March 1, 1979, in McCracken County, Kentucky. She has stated, "My name is actually from the Lord of the Rings books and now movies. My dad was a huge fan of Lord of the Rings, and Éowyn is one of the characters. People always ask me if it's my real name, but it really is."

== Career ==
Éowyn's first single "Take Me Away" ranked at No. 18, and her second single "Hold Me" went to No. 15. Nashville's Embassy Music noticed her and awarded her Grand Prize winning songwriter for her song "Break Free". She also caught the attention of some of the top producers in the industry, including veterans Kevan Cyka (Lifehouse, R.E.M., Hilary Duff), Dan Needham (Stacie Orrico, Steven Curtis Chapman) and Matt Bronleewe (Plumb, Joy Williams).

In August 2006, Éowyn's guitarist Matt Hallmark was killed in a car crash driving home from Nashville after a concert tour. Her song "Unfinished Memories" on Silent Screams was written in his memory.

Due to financial difficulties, in 2008 she was forced to announce her departure from the industry and sell everything that had to do with her musical career. In 2011, with what Éowyn describes as "only by God's grace," she is back.

Silent Screams (2008) and Beautiful Ashes (2011), were produced by Travis Wyrick (P.O.D., Disciple, Pillar) at Lakeside Studios. "Cliche" hit No. 17 on the Billboard Christian Rock Airplay chart in October 2012.

== Personal life ==
She is married to her manager and current keyboardist Russell Riggins.

== Discography ==
=== Studio albums ===
- Shattered Illusions (2003)
- Identity (2006)
- Silent Screams (2008)
- Beautiful Ashes (2011)
- Just Believe (2018)

=== Singles ===
- "Take Me Away" (2004)
- "Hold Me" (2004)
- "Locked Away" (2006)
- "Escape" (2006)
- "Remedy" (2006)
- "Silent Screams" (2008)
- "Crashing" (2009)
- "Beautiful Ashes" (2011)
- "Fail Safe" (2011)
- "Cliché" (2012)
- "For the Life of Me" (2013)
