= One Love Revolution =

Studio album by Pillar
- Released: August 18, 2015
- Recorded: 2013–2015
- Genre: Alternative metal, Christian metal, post-grunge
- Length: 42:21
- Label: Independent

Pillar chronology
Confessions (2009)	One Love Revolution (2015)

One Love Revolution is the seventh album by Pillar. The album released on August 18, 2015, at LifeWay, and everywhere else on August 21, 2015.

== Critical reception ==
Professional ratings
Review scores
Source	Rating
CCM Magazine	3/5 stars
Christian Music Review	4.5/5
Cross Rhythms	10/10 squares
Jesus Freak Hideout	4/5 stars 3.5/5 stars

Matt Conner, giving the album three stars from CCM Magazine, describes, "One Love Revolution loads the musical guns once again with surefire live hits...Overall, Pillar trods familiar ground on One Love Revolution, but there's no reason to miss with such a winning formula." Awarding the album four stars for Jesus Freak Hideout, Christopher Smith writes, "it has a certain timeless quality about it." Kevin Hoskins, giving the album four stars at Jesus Freak Hideout, states, "There are some solid ballad types found here". Rating the album three and a half stars from Jesus Freak Hideout, Scott Fryberger says, "One Love Revolution is far from groundbreaking, but it's a solid album, and it's comforting to hear an old favorite getting back together to show that they still have it, and can still do rock music better than a lot of new rock bands." Michael Weaver, indicating in a three and a half star review for Jesus Freak Hideout, mentioning, "One Love Revolution shouldn't necessarily be considered a triumphant return, but it is most definitely a solid one." Signaling in a four and a half out of five review at Christian Music Review, Abby Baracskai, recognizes, "One Love Revolution is a great comeback album that includes touches of new things, musically and lyrically, but is everything you could want in an album to help strengthen your faith and be able to head bang and rock out to." Rob Birtley, specifying in a ten out of ten review for Cross Rhythms, responds, "this is an album which excels in both musical power and spiritual substance and one I'd readily recommend to all rock music fans."

== Track listing ==
All tracks are written by Pillar.

Track list
No.	Title	Length
1.	"One Love Revolution"	3:08
2.	"Disconnect"	4:10
3.	"Nails"	4:05
4.	"We Ride"	3:40
5.	"Shooting Star"	3:35
6.	"Unafraid"	3:29
7.	"Ember of Hope"	2:38
8.	"Paratrooper"	4:04
9.	"Embrace the Chaos"	3:22
10.	"Lion Leads the Way"	3:14
11.	"More Alive"	3:15
12.	"Don't Cry Forever"	3:37
Total length:		42:21

Digital exclusive
No.	Title	Length
13.	"A Season (bonus track)"	3:47

LifeWay exclusive
No.	Title	Length
13.	"Fall the Foe"	4:07

== Chart performance ==
Chart (2015)	Peak position
US Top Alternative Albums (Billboard)	25
US Christian Albums (Billboard)	8
US Top Hard Rock Albums (Billboard)	17
US Top Rock Albums (Billboard)	42
