= Confessions (Pillar album) =

Studio album by Pillar
- Released: September 22, 2009
- Recorded: April–June 2009
- Genres: Post-grunge, heavy metal, hard rock, Christian metal
- Length: 38:04
- Label: Essential
- Producer: Rob Graves

Pillar chronology
For the Love of the Game (2008)	Confessions (2009)	One Love Revolution (2015)

Singles from Confessions
- 1. "Secrets and Regrets" Released: June 2009; 2. "Fire on the Inside" Released: July 2009; 3. "Shine" Released: December 2009; 4. "Whatever it Takes" Released: April 2010

Confessions is the sixth album, from the Christian rock band Pillar. The album was released on September 22, 2009, by Essential Records.

== Musical style and concepts ==
Rob Beckley commented about the album, "I had never had goose bumps listening to our own music before, but this album is just on a whole different level. We're indebted to everyone who played a role in pushing us out of our comfort zones. And I couldn't be more proud of our band."

Beckley further describes the concept as, "1 John 1:9 says, 'If we confess our sins, God is faithful and just to forgive us our sins and cleanse us from all unrighteousness.' Every song on this album could be broken down to 'If you just confess.'" Under this umbrella, recurring themes on Confessions include unity, commitment and perseverance.

When Blaine Barcus, VP of A&R, Provident Label Group talked about the album he spoke highly of it saying, "the album features songs which range from muscular, guitar-driven gut rock to beautiful, orchestral ballads. "Confessions is the kind of album that will make CHR radio listeners fans of rock music. The goal was that every single song on this album would be a great fit for radio, and I think the overall project reflects that goal. Rob and the guys poured themselves into the music and this project really delivers.”

== Critical reception ==
Professional ratings
Review scores
Source	Rating
AllMusic	4.5/5 stars
Christian Broadcasting Network	2.5/5 stars
The Christian Manifesto	3.5/5 stars
Christianity Today	3/5 stars
CM Spin	9/10 stars
Cross Rhythms	8/10 stars
Jesus Freak Hideout	4.5/5 stars 3/5 stars
Louder Than the Music	4/5 stars
New Release Tuesday	3/5 stars
The Phantom Tollbooth	0/5 stars

Confessions garnered mostly positive reception by eleven music critics.

At AllMusic, Jared Johnson rated the album four-and-a-half stars, writing that "Pillar not just going through the motions but rather carving out a surprisingly intimate niche for themselves in the melodic rock world." Graeme Crawford of Cross Rhythms rated the album eight out of ten, calling it "not a groundbreaking album", but the band "retain their typical focus and deliver a strong album in their usual style." At Jesus Freak Hideout, Kevin Hoskins rated the album four-and-a-half stars, noting how "it’s a great record" on which "Pillar serves up a notable change that comes out nicely."

Kevin Kempton of CM Spin rate the album nine out of ten, calling this "very typical to past Pillar releases" on which "there isn't a bad song on the album", and "There is a lot to love about Pillar's Confessions." At Louder Than the Music, Suzanne Physick rated the album four stars, saying that this is "a great album". Thomas Jenkins of The Christian Manifesto rated the album three-and-a-half stars, stating that "final thoughts are most definitely positive."

At New Release Tuesday, Jonathan Francesco rated the album three stars, commenting that "Most of the songs had some high enjoyability to them". Roger Gelwicks giving a second opinion review at Jesus Freak Hideout rated the album three stars, stating that the album is "unfortunately mostly a forgettable hard rock experience." At Christianity Today, Andrea Dawn Goforth rated the album three stars, noting the album is "cookie-cutter" on which "tunes feel uninspired and become filler between the better songs."

Rob Vischer of Christian Broadcasting Network rated the album two-and-a-half spins, stating that "If mosh-pits and radio play measure success, Pillar's sixth album, Confessions, will be quite smashing. Unfortunately, after the fist-pumping melodies end and the driving guitarmonies fade, there's not much there. Unwrapping this album is like going on a blind date with a gorgeous airhead. Looks good. Seems fun. But not very clever." At The Phantom Tollbooth, Jerry Bolton rated the album zero tocks, cautioning that "Confessions is a couple bad covers, a handful of flagrant unoriginality, and an earfull of sounds you've already heard elsewhere."

== Track listing ==
1. "Fire on the Inside" - 3:22
2. "Whatever It Takes" - 3:52
3. "Secrets and Regrets" - 4:43
4. "Better Off Now" - 3:26
5. "Not Without a Fight" - 3:08
6. "Will You Be There" - 3:53
7. "Shine" (Collective Soul Cover) - 4:38
8. "Call to Action" (Copper cover) - 3:48
9. "Lose It All" - 3:29
10. "You Are Not the End" - 3:35

== Personnel ==
Pillar

- Rob Beckley - vocals, rhythm guitar
- Noah Henson - lead guitar
- Rich Gilliland - bass guitar
- Taylor Carrol - drums at the time of the album's release

Production

- Rob Graves – production, engineer, programmer, composer
- Jasen Rauch – programmer, composer
- Noah Henson – programmer
- Bobby Shin – engineer
- Mike Gilliland – engineer
- Rachel Sikkenga – engineer
- Andrew Meyer – engineer, digital editing
- Jim Cooper – engineer, digital editing
- Fred Paragano – engineer
- Sarah Vorhees – digital editing
- Brian Calhoon – digital editing
- David Davidson – string arranger
- Tony Palacios – mixing
- Tom Baker – mastering

Additional Personnel

- Rachel Sikkenga – backing vocals, additional backing vocals
- Jim Cooper – additional backing vocals
- Joe Rickard – studio drummer
- John Catchings – cello
- Monisa Angell – viola
- David Davidson – violin
- David Angell – violin

== Charts ==
Chart (2009)	Peak position
U.S. Billboard 200	89
U.S. Billboard Top Alternative Albums	23
U.S. Billboard Top Rock Albums	35
U.S. Billboard Top Christian Albums	4
U.S. Billboard Top Hard Rock Albums	11

== Awards ==
In 2010, the album was nominated for a Dove Award for Rock/Contemporary Album of the Year at the 41st GMA Dove Awards.
