= Skylight (band) =

South African rock band

- Origin: Johannesburg, South Africa
- Genres: Rock, pop rock
- Years active: 2009–present
- Members: Greg Jorden; Wesley Ayliffe; Peter Klein; Bradley Cumming

Skylight is a South African pop rock band from Johannesburg. They formed in 2009 and are known for spreading an ethos of peace and love. The band rose to prominence when they won the 'Road to Joburg Day' competition in 2010.

== History ==
Skylight formed in 2009 when Gregory Jorden, Bradley Cumming and Peter Klein met while playing at a local Christmas carols event in December 2008. They began to write music together and called the collective Skylight, a reference to allowing the light to shine into people's lives. In 2010 the band entered the SA's Got Talent reality competition and placed in the Top 20. During this time they released their single "Always Enough", which secured them a spot on the Joburg Day line-up, performing in front of 18,000 people. Due to the discovery of nodules on Gregory Jorden's vocal chords, the band was forced to take some time off. He healed naturally over a period of two-years before heading into the studio with Grammy- and SAMA-winning producer Darryl Torr, to record the band's debut album, which was released in December 2013.

It then took another two years of writing, pre-production and recording to produce and release the album, Made for More. The album was released independently and the band has not shown any interest in signing with a record label.

In studio they met Wesley Ayliffe, assistant engineer, who went on to become the fourth member of the band, assuming the role of guitarist and back-up vocalist. The 10-track album is filled with inspirational messages and makes many references to their Christian faith.

== Style ==
Skylight is considered to be a pop-rock band., with a strong influence in contemporary Christian music. Their sounds are reminiscent of the melodic styles of Matchbox 20 and The Fray

== Reception ==
Skylight has received mainly good reviews worldwide. Their debut album Made For More received a four out of five rating by the Celebrity Café stating, "The inspirational lyrics are what make this album as powerful as it is." Therese Owen of The Star praised the band for being "A breath of fresh air on the commercial scene and certainly have the potential to rise to the heights of popular bands like Gangs of Ballet, Just Jinjer and Prime Circle."

== Members ==
- Greg Jorden – vocals, guitar
- Wesley Aycliffe – backup vocals, guitar
- Peter Klein – bass guitar
- Bradley Cumming – drums

== Discography ==
- Made For More (2014)
