= Justifide =

American rock band

- Origin: Chandler, AZ
- Genres: Christian rock; Christian metal; nu metal; rapcore; hard rock
- Years active: 1999–2006; 2014-2015
- Labels: Ardent; Cul-De Sac
- Members: Jason Moncivaiz; Sambo Moncivaiz; Joey Avalos

Justifide is an American rock band from Chandler, Arizona, founded in 1999. The band consists of Jason Moncivaiz (vocals, drums), Sambo Moncivaiz (bass), and Joey Avalos (guitar). The band has seen success in Christian rock circles, and they have released two albums: Life Outside The Toy Box (2001) and The Beauty of the Unknown (2002).

On December 11, 2014, Justifide announced a reunion and a new album, The Vault Sessions, which is scheduled to release in summer 2015.

== History ==
The history of Justifide began at home with the brokenness of distressed family relations, and that eventually led to experiments with alcohol and other drugs. While they were only in their teens, the Moncivaiz brothers lived in a house that was stressed to the breaking point, with the parents separated. This started to spiral downward, and would have ended up much worse. Convinced of the family's need for God, the Moncivaiz father became born again. This changed lives of those in the family. Music was a natural outlet for the family, as both brothers started learning instruments at a young age.

Justifide started with Ian Metzger as the vocalist, Jason Moncivaiz on drums, Sambo Moncivaiz on the bass, Joey Avalos playing the guitar. Their songs are not of overly depressive nor over-joyous tone. In the words of singer Jason Moncivaiz:

We try to touch on all of the human experience. Life and death, love and loss. We don't just experience the emotion of joy. There's a lot of other stuff going on in us, too. So not all of our songs are coming from a 'happy' place. And not all of our songs are going to be depressing and sad, we're trying to write about all of life, all of the things we're feeling.

After about a year of touring and recording their first EP, Ian Metzger left the band. Jason started singing as well as playing the drums. They toured a bit as a three piece band, but eventually started hiring drummers to free up Jason for vocals. Some of the drummers they worked with were Jaren Johnston of The Cadillac Three, Jeff Irizarry of Dear Ephesus and Micah Schweinsberg of The Crabb Family and Diamond Rio.

After Joey Avalos left Justifide in 2003, Jason and Sambo formed a new band, Reform the Resistance. The band has maintained the nu metal/rapcore sound.

== Awards and Rankings ==
Christian Rock Radio

- -#1 “Pointing Fingers” (The Beauty Of The Unknown)
- -#1 “To Live” (The Beauty Of The Unknown)
- -#2 “The Way” (Life Outside The Toybox)
- -#3 “9 Out of 10” (Life Outside The Toybox)
- -#4 “Our Little Secret” (Life Outside The Toybox)

Awards and Accolades

- -2001 Dove Nominations – Hard Music Recorded Song (“9 Out of 10”), Hard Music Album (Life Outside The Toybox)
- -2001 R&R Top Christian Rock Impact Artists of 2001

== Members ==
Last Known Lineup

- Jason Moncivaiz - Drums, Vocals (Reform the Resistance)
- Sambo Moncivaiz - Bass (Reform the Resistance)

Former

- Ian Metzger - Vocals (1999–2000)
- Joey Avalos - Guitar (1999–2003)

Former touring musicians

- Jeff Irizarry - Drums (Dear Ephesus)
- Jaren Johnston - Drums (The Cadillac Three)
- Joel Stumbaugh - Drums
- Micah Schweinsburg - Drums (The Crabb Family, Crabb Revival)
- Victor Campos- Guitars

(Digital e)

== Discography ==
Album name	Label	Year released
Justifide EP	Independent	1999
Life Outside the Toybox	Ardent Records	2001
The Beauty of the Unknown	Ardent Records	2002
The Vault Sessions	Independent	2014
