= Sumerlin =

American Christian rock band

- Origin: Wilmington, North Carolina
- Genres: Hard rock; Alternative Rock; Christian Rock
- Years active: 2009–present
- Labels: Dream, Mosaic Artistry/Capitol Christian Music Group
- Members: Dan DiGiovanni; Logan Tudor; Chris Taylor; Joshua Mace; Tyler Klee; Hunter Klein
- Past members: Justin Berrier

Sumerlin are an American Christian rock band from Wilmington, North Carolina. The band is currently composed of Dan DiGiovanni, Logan Tudor, Chris Taylor, Joshua Mace, Hunter Klein, and Tyler Klee.

== History ==
The band formed in 2009, however their first release was 2010's, Forfeit the Compass EP. Two years later, the group released, Motives EP, through Mosaic Artistry. Their first ever Billboard charting was for "Just a Dream" that reached No. 14 on the Christian Rock songs chart. This EP would see the band chart "The Fallback", their second single, on the Christian Rock songs chart at a peak of No. 2. Their debut studio album with Dream Records was released on February 4, 2014, Runaways. This debut album saw the band chart twice more on the Christian Rock songs chart with "Breaking Out" at No. 1 and "Heartbeat" at No. 6. The group released the deluxe edition of this album on February 15, 2015, and its first single "Out of My Head" reached No. 1 on the Christian Rock songs chart. The band is back to playing live shows, with their first show back (Sold Out) in Dunn, NC 9.18.26 at The Bird’s Nest. The band is also currently writing new music according to their social media accounts.

Justin Berrier was a transitional bassist between Hunter Klein and Chris Taylor. Chris Taylor being the longest running bassist for the band ahead of the return of Sumerlin’s original bassist, Hunter Klein in 2026. To which Chris Taylor picked up his native instrument, the guitar. This awakening has also brought another original member, Tyler Klee, back on third guitar. This is the first time Sumerlin features a six member lineup consisting of all five original members plus long time member, Chris Taylor.

== Members ==
- Dan DiGiovanni – lead vocals
- Logan Tudor – guitar
- Chris Taylor – guitar, backing vocals
- Joshua Mace – drums
- Hunter Klein - bass
- Tyler Klee - guitar

== Discography ==
Albums

- Runaways, Dream Records (2014)
- Runaways: Deluxe Edition, Dream Records (2015)

EPs

- Forfeit the Compass, Independent (2010)
- Motives, Independent (2012)

Singles

Year	Single	Chart Positions
Year	Single	US Chr Rock
2013	"Just a Dream"	14
2013	"The Fallback"	2
2014	"Breaking Out"	1
2014	"Heartbeat"	6
2015	"Out of My Head"	1
