= Jason and the G-Men =

American contemporary Christian band (1991–2000)

Jason and the G Men
- Jason and the G Men circa 1993

Background information
- Origin: Minnesota
- Genre: Christian
- Years active: 1991–2000

Jason and the G-Men was a contemporary Christian band from Minnesota founded in 1991 by Jason Harms, Greg Seeger, Rick McKinley and Rick Corliss. The Encyclopedia of Contemporary Christian Music refers to them as possibly "Christian music's answer to Harry Connick Jr."

Their music was often compared to that of Frank Sinatra, Tony Bennett, or Gene Krupa. As these comparisons indicate their music was more connected with traditional, 1940s style swing than swing revival bands such as The Brian Setzer Orchestra, although their primary period of activity was linked to the latter. Within Christian music their act was relatively unique; according to one reviewer they compared only to a few tracks produced by Carman. Their albums featured reworked hymns, jazz standards and some original songs.

They opened for The Winans in 1992 and recorded a self-titled cassette only demo in the former studios of KTIS. In 1993 they appeared at the Gospel Music Association's Music in the Rockies New Artists Showcase. True Tunes News gave them favorable reviews playing at Cornerstone in 1993. "G" as in Men was recorded live in concert in 1996 at Heritage Christian Center in Aurora, Colorado and MPR Studio "M" in St. Paul, Minnesota. Similarly, their 1999 release Swing Hard, Swing Often was recorded live. Jason and the G-Men disbanded in 2000, but Jason Harms continues to record with his brother Jesse Harms in a group called the Jason Harms Quartet

== Members ==
Original

- Jason Harms – Vocals, Guitar
- Greg Seeger – Upright bass
- Rick McKinley – Piano, Trombone
- Rick Corliss – Drums

Subsequent / touring members

- Jeremy Walker – Saxophone
- Adrian Walker – Piano
- Jesse Harms – Upright Bass, Vocals
- Christopher Fashun – Vibes/Percussion
- Dean Kleven – Piano
- Jeff Brueske – Guitar
- Isaac Harms – Drums
- Paul Babcock – Drums
- Don Stille – Piano
- Gary Denbow – Saxophone

== Discography ==
- 1992: Jason and the G-Men – Cassette-Only Demo; recorded in KTIS Studios
- 1994: Walkin' the Beat (Reviews:Cornerstone, )
- 1996: "G" as in Men (Review: Cornerstone, The Phantom Tollbooth (2))
- 1999: Swing Hard, Swing Often (Review: The Phantom Tollbooth (3))
