= Hearts Like Lions =

American indie rock band

- Origin: Long Beach, California, United States
- Genres: indie rock, post-hardcore, progressive rock, alternative rock
- Years active: 2011–2021
- Labels: Tooth & Nail

Hearts Like Lions was an American indie rock band, and they played an alternative rock music style. Hailing from Long Beach, California and were formed in 2011, they remained a band for the next 10 years. Their first extended play, These Hands, was released in 2014, with Tooth & Nail Records. Their single, "Stranger", broke through on the Billboard magazine Christian Rock chart.

Singer Stephen Ramos and drummer Nick Sturz have now gone on to play in their new musical endeavor called WILDER.

== Background ==
The band is from Long Beach, California, where they formed in 2011, with lead vocalist and guitarist, Stephen Ramos, whose current members are lead guitarist and singer, Michael Grasseschi, bassist, Luke Schoepf, and drummer, Nick Sturz. Their former band members were guitarist, Brandon Fox, bassist, Eric Rivers, keyboardist, Ariel Painschab, and drummer, Rick Raasch. They were signed to Tooth & Nail Records, in 2014.

== Music history ==
The band commenced as a musical entity in 2011, with their first major label extended play, These Hands, that released on December 2, 2014, from Tooth & Nail Records. Their single, "Stranger", found success on the Billboard magazine Christian Rock charts, where it reached a peak of No. 2.

== Members ==
Band members

- Stephen Danny Ramos – lead vocals, guitar
- Nick Sturz – drums
- Luke Schoepf – bass
- Michael Grasseschi - backing vocals, lead guitar
- Brendan Fox – guitar
- Garrick Fieger – bass
- Ariel Painschab – keys
- Rick Raasch – drums

== Discography ==
Studio albums

- If I Never Speak Again (February 17, 2017, Tooth & Nail)

EPs

- These Hands (December 2, 2014, Tooth & Nail)

Singles

Year	Single	Chart Positions
Year	Single	US Chr Rock
2015	"Stranger"	2
