= Michael Wittig =

American contemporary Christian musician (born 1976)

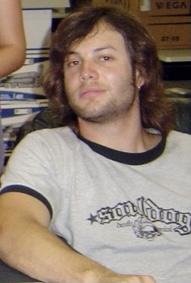
- Wittig in 2004

Background information
- Also known as: Kalel
- Born: Michael Richard Wittig; August 21, 1976 (age 49); Riverside, California, U.S.
- Genres: Contemporary Christian music (Christian rock), alternative rock
- Occupations: Bassist, Personal Trainer, Bodybuilder
- Instruments: American Christian musician (rhythm guitar, bass guitar, harmonica)
- Years active: 1993 - present
- Label: Sony
- Formerly of: Stars Go Dim; Pillar

Michael Richard "Kalel" Wittig (born August 21, 1976) is an American contemporary Christian musician best known as the bass player for the Christian rock band Pillar.

After ten years of playing with Pillar, Wittig left the band in September 2008. He then later returned to the band in 2012. He was also a member of pop rock band Stars Go Dim, with Joey Avalos, Lester Estelle Jr. (former drummer for Pillar) and Chris Cleveland until 2012.

== Biography ==
=== Musical career ===
In 1992, he formed a Christian band in his garage. The band was originally called Q: The Source (named after the Q document), but they eventually renamed it as Godspeed for the release of their self-titled EP. Wittig's fellow Godspeed members were Mahlon Tobias and Robert Brouhard.

He graduated from Riverside Polytechnic High School in 1994, and soon left to go to college in Hays, Kansas at Fort Hays State University. While living there he played bass for a Christian Metal band, Tetelestai, which at some point broke up. Wittig sold his vehicle to some locals and made mention of wanting to start a band. This information was passed along to Robert Debes who became Wittig's roommate. During this time, Wittig became involved in another band, named Mishap. Wittig was introduced to Rob Beckley, a vocalist and Travis Jenkins, a guitar player. They formed Pillar. After playing with Pillar for ten years, Michael Wittig left the band in September 2008 for multiple reasons. While in Pillar, in 2007 Wittig with his friends Lester Estelle, Jr. and Joey Avalos formed pop rock band Stars Go Dim in which he played till 2012 but left for personal reasons.

Wittig reunited with Pillar in 2012 and began to lay tracks for a new album. In August 2015 their latest album One Love Revolution was released.

== Personal life ==
Michael Wittig has two sons and, as of summer 2010, twin daughters and lives with his wife in Oklahoma.
