= For the Love of the Game (album) =

Studio album by Pillar
- Released: February 26, 2008
- Genres: Christian metal, alternative metal, hard rock
- Length: 37:46
- Label: Essential
- Producer: Travis Wyrick

Pillar chronology
The Reckoning (2006)	For the Love of the Game (2008)	Confessions (2009)

For the Love of the Game is the fifth studio album from Christian metal group Pillar, which was released on February 26, 2008. According to their website, Pillar defines the title as: "For the love of" = the passion of, and "The game" = the pursuit of Christ. This is the last album to include longtime drummer, Lester Estelle, and bass player and founding member, Michael Wittig until they rejoined the band in 2012. During live performances of "Smiling Down", Rob Beckley plays acoustic guitar.

The album debuted at No. 71 on the Billboard 200 albums chart and reached No. 4 on the Christian (overall) albums chart.

== Critical reception ==
Professional ratings
Review scores
Source	Rating
The Albums Project	3/5 stars
AllMusic	4/5 stars
CCM Magazine	3/5 stars
The Christian Manifesto	5/5 stars
Christian Music Review	92%
Christianity Today	3.5/5 stars
Cross Rhythms	9/10 stars
Jesus Freak Hideout	4/5 stars
New Release Tuesday	4.5/5 stars
The Phantom Tollbooth	2/5 stars

For the Love of the Game garnered generally positive reception from eleven music critics. At Christianity Today, Russ Breimeier rated the album three-and-a-half stars, stating that "Pillar nevertheless seems more focused and invigorated on this enjoyably rocking album." Jared Johnson of Allmusic rated the album four stars, writing that the "renewed focus gives it enough revitalization to pique some interest". At CCM Magazine, Kenneth Mueller rated the album three stars, saying that the band "have created an album that could generate plenty of hits for radio and will have you singing along loudly while pumping your fist in the air."

Christian Cunningham of Cross Rhythms rated the album nine out of ten, stating that "each has been meticulously created and sumptuously finished so it's as if asking for more would simply be being greedy. Every member of the band has upped their game for this opus." At Jesus Freak Hideout, Justin Mabee rated the album four stars, writing that the album "is definitely a thumbs up for Pillar, and they've done a great job at mixing what they've learned in the past with the experience they've picked up along the way." Scott Fryberger of Jesus Freak Hideout gave a second opinion rating of four stars, calling this "the chug-filled rocker."

At New Release Tuesday, Kevin Davis rated the album four-and-a-half stars, stating that "If you like rock music with a great message, then you must get this very impressive rock album." Mike Strubie of Christian Music Review rated the album a 92-percent, writing that "because the music was very good but I just could not give it a perfect score." At The Albums Project, they rated the album three stars, calling it a "really solid release". Calvin E'Jon Moore of The Phantom Tollbooth rated the album a perfect five stars, affirming that "Pillar has crafted a project that will define them for years to come." At The Phantom Tollbooth, Jerry Bolton rated the album two tocks, telling that "as a whole" the album engendered "mixed feelings" from him.

== Track listing ==
1. "For the Love of the Game" – 3:50
2. "Turn It Up" – 3:50
3. "Reckless Youth" – 3:28
4. "State of Emergency" – 4:46
5. "Smiling Down" – 3:26
6. "The Runaway" – 3:09
7. "Throwdown" – 3:58
8. "Get Back" – 3:24
9. "I Fade Away" (featuring Sarah Anthony from The Letter Black) – 3:40
10. "Forever Starts Now" – 4:15

=== Japanese edition bonus tracks ===
11. "Everything" - 3:13
12. "Dangerous" (album version) - 3:40

== Singles ==
- "For the Love of the Game" was the first single, peaking at No. 1 on Christianrock.net.
- "Smiling Down" peaked in the Top 10 on Air1 radio.
- "Reckless Youth" was released as a single in May 2008.
- "Turn It Up" was also released as a single, peaking in the Top 5 on Christianrock.net in late 2008.
- "State of Emergency" was released in February 2009, and finished in the Top 10 in June 2009, to make way for the new album.

== Awards ==
The album was nominated for a Dove Award for Rock Album of the Year at the 40th GMA Dove Awards. The title song was also nominated for Rock Recorded Song of the Year.
