= Pillar (band) =

American Christian rock band

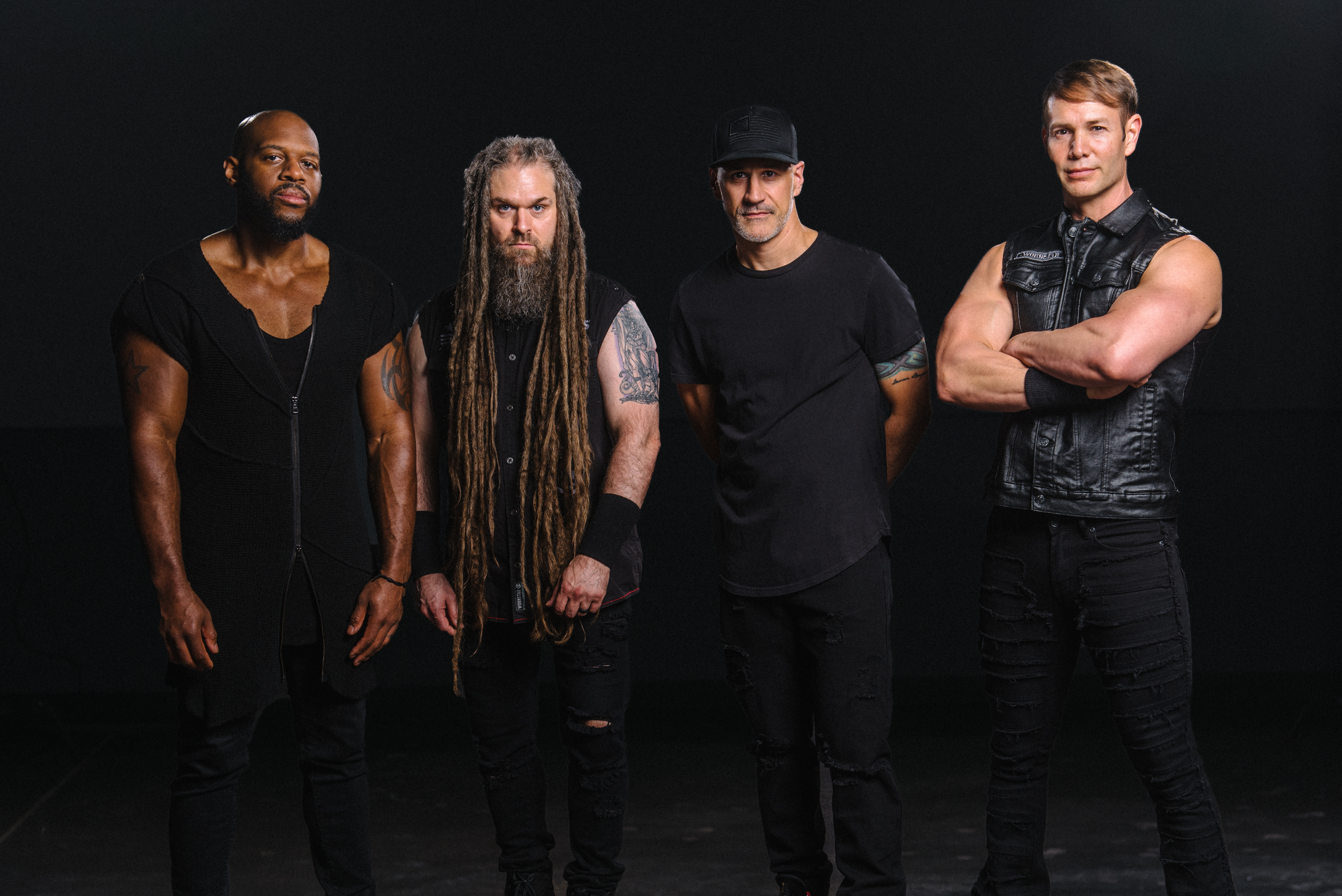
- Pillar in 2024: (left to right) Estelle, Henson, Beckley, Wittig

Background information
- Origin: Tulsa, Oklahoma, U.S.
- Genres: Christian rock; Christian metal; hard rock; rap rock; alternative metal; nu metal (early)
- Works: Pillar discography
- Years active: 1998–present
- Labels: Sony BMG, Essential, Flicker
- Members: Rob Beckley; Noah Henson; Michael "Kalel" Wittig; Lester Estelle
- Past members: Brad Noone; Travis Jenkins; Dustin Adams; Joey Avalos; Chase Lovelace; Rich Gilliland; Taylor Carroll
- Website: pillarmusic.com

Pillar is an American Christian rock band from Tulsa, consisting of members Rob Beckley, Noah Henson, Michael "Kalel" Wittig, and Lester Estelle II. The band has released nine studio albums, three EPs, and 24 singles since its formation in 1998.

Though known for their use of rapping early in their career, the band used this vocal style less on later releases.

== History ==
=== Formation and independent albums (1998–2000) ===
Pillar started in Hays, Kansas in 1998, when Fort Hays State University roommates Brad Noone and Rob Beckley got together with friends Travis Jenkins, Dustin Adams, and Michael Wittig, known as Kalel. In 1999, Pillar released their first album, Metamorphosis, on their own independent label, Shadrach Records. After some more touring in Kansas, they released their second independent album, Original Superman, in 2000. Around this time they relocated to Tulsa, Oklahoma to try to find a larger fan base.

=== Flicker Records era (2000–2006) ===
Soon after the release of Original Superman, Pillar became noticed by Flicker Records, who signed them in mid 2000. After the signing, Pillar re-cut many of the tracks from Original Superman as well as a few new tracks for release on Above, their first major label album. The album had medium success, selling almost 60,000 copies. The song "Open Your Eyes" won a Dove Award in 2001 for Hard Music Song of the Year. Also, the songs "Original Superman" and "Live for Him" helped in Pillar's success.

In 2002, Noah Henson took over guitar duties and Pillar released their breakthrough album, Fireproof. It sold over 300,000 copies, and launched national tours. It also won two Dove Awards. A year later Pillar went back into the studio with Fireproof and released a newer, richer-sounding version with little tweaks in songs, including a bonus DVD; this resulted in two versions of Fireproof being on the market.

Soon after the release of Fireproof, drummer Lester Estelle Jr. joined the band.

In 2004, Pillar released their next album Where Do We Go from Here capturing No. 1 on sales in the Christian charts for weeks. The album featured multiple hits, including "Bring Me Down", and, "Frontline" which topped the charts for months, and was also one of their most popular songs. Not only did Christian shows and stations play "Bring Me Down", it was requested heavily on secular stations as well. "Bring Me Down" was also featured on the sound track for Mx vs ATV: Unleashed. Thanks to its success on digital platforms, "Frontline" went on to be certified gold by the RIAA in July 2020.

Pillar released an EP called Nothing Comes for Free in June 2006. It featured three new songs (including "Everything") and four live tracks. The other two new songs, "Our Escape" and "Dangerous", are not available on their following album, The Reckoning. The EP was only available at live shows and at their webstore. A limited number of copies (10,000) were created.

Pillar then recorded their fourth album, The Reckoning, in late 2006. Travis Wyrick (P.O.D., We as Human, 10 Years, Disciple) produced the new album, as he produced all of their previous albums, and it was released on October 3, 2006. In support of The Reckoning, Pillar embarked on "The Days of the Reckoning Tour" throughout October and November 2006. Other Christian bands on the tour included Day of Fire, the Showdown, and Decyfer Down. The Reckoning received a Grammy Award nomination December 6, 2007, for Best Rock or Rap Gospel Album, a first for the band.

=== For the Love of the Game (2007–2009) ===
Pillar has played at both Cornerstone Festival and Creation Festival. It was revealed at Soulfest 2007 that the name of their next album would be For the Love of the Game, which was eventually released on February 26, 2008. They brought back the Pillar logo from "Where Do We Go from Here" and "Fireproof" for it. ESPN used the new Pillar song, "For the Love of the Game," during montages highlighting the 2007 World Series on its program Baseball Tonight. For the Love of the Game is the last Pillar record produced by Travis Wyrick.

Pillar helped Eowyn record her album Silent Screams, with Beckley contributing vocals to the title track and Henson and Estelle also playing on the album. Pillar toured on the SHOUTfest tour with After Edmund and various other artists from September to November 2007. They also had a tour for For the Love of the Game from February to April 2008, with Brooke Barrettsmith, Wavorly, and Building 429.

In the fall of 2008, Pillar embarked on the For the Love of the Fan Tour, which enabled the fans to decide their own ticket price for the show. The tour lasted for three weeks and ended on September 26, 2008, in Dallas, Texas. Lester announced the For the Love of the Fan Tour would be his last tour with Pillar. Kalel was not seen playing bass for Pillar, but was being filled in forby Josh Gleave (formerly with Jeremy Riddle). Later, Kalel announced on his Myspace page his decision for leaving Pillar was due to Lester's departure from the band, and because Kalel was involved with helping independent bands such as One Minute Halo and Stars Go Dim. Making singer Rob Beckley the only original member of Pillar. Kalel also stated that he wanted to be at home with his wife and two children and not be on the road all the time.

Kalel's bass part was filled in for a short time by Josh Gleave. Richard Gilliland met Pillar while preparing for the Creation Festival tour (at the time he was playing for KJ-52); he then joined Pillar as bass player and subsequently stopped playing for KJ. Gilliland's first show with Pillar was at Creation Festival. Pillar attempted to replace Lester several times. James Holloway was hired to play drums for the Creation tour. Chase Lovelace then joined the band; however, for unknown reasons, Lovelace left the band after only being a member for a couple months.

=== Confessions and unofficial hiatus (2009–2012) ===
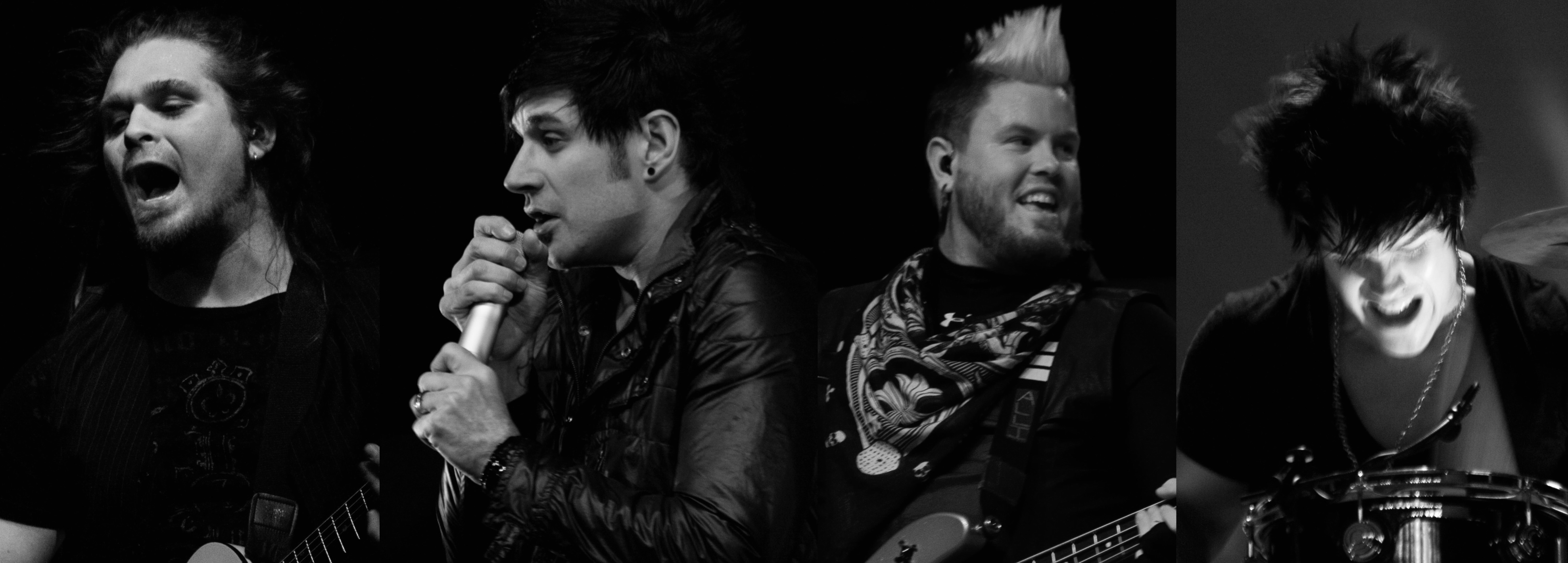
Pillar in 2010. L–R: Noah Henson, Rob Beckley, Rich Gilliland, Taylor Carroll

Rob Beckley stated that Rob Graves, who has worked with RED and Wavorly, would produce the new album. This was the first Pillar record not produced by Travis Wyrick and the only album recorded without band co-founder/bassist Michael Kalel Wittig. Joe Rickard of RED recorded all drum tracks for this record. The next Pillar drummer, Taylor Carroll, joined around March 2009, after the recording process of the new album.

Confessions was released on September 22, 2009. The first two singles from the album, "Secrets and Regrets" and "Fire on the Inside", were released on July 17, 2009. Pillar was touring to promote the album and supported Red on their "Nothing and Everything tour", which also featured the Wedding. Their cover of Collective Soul's song, "Shine", was released as the third single from the album. Their fourth single, "Whatever It Takes", reached number one on June 6, 2010.

In 2010, the album was nominated for a Dove Award for Rock/Contemporary Album of the Year at the 41st GMA Dove Awards.

In 2011, Pillar played only one show, at Solid Festival on October 29. During this show, Taylor Caroll was not playing with the band because by that time he had left to pursue a solo career.

=== Reunion, One Love Revolution, and recent activity (2012–present) ===
On February 2, 2012, it was revealed Rob Beckley was going to release his first solo record through idefi Music on March 14, 2012. The first single off the record, "Value of My Heart", was released on September 1, 2012. It is now downloadable for free on the renewed Pillar website. Beckley's solo album remains unreleased ever since.

On October 27, 2012, Pillar announced that all four members from 2001–2008 (Rob Beckley, Noah Henson, Michael Kalel Wittig and Lester Estelle) would be reuniting with plans of releasing a new album.

On December 15, 2012, Pillar released their version of the traditional Christmas carol "God Rest Ye Merry Gentlemen" as a free downloadable single on NoiseTrade.

A new song titled "Lion Leads the Way" was released in April 2014. The heavy rock song was written as the soundtrack for the movie Day of War.

One Love Revolution was crowdfunded via Kickstarter and released independently on August 18, 2015. No touring activity happened and no official music videos were released to promote the album.

On December 24, 2019, the band released a Christmas single "Do You Hear What I Hear" as a free download. Until 2023, there were no updates on the band's activity since. Frontman Rob Beckley became a pastor; Noah Henson went on to perform as a live guitarist/backing vocalist for Brantley Gilbert; bassist Michael Wittig pursued a bodybuilder/fitness trainer career; Lester Estelle performs as a live drummer for Kelly Clarkson.

In November 2023, Pillar announced a three-date reunion tour which is scheduled to take place in June and July 2024, as well as releasing One Love Revolution on CD and, for the first time for the band, on a vinyl release.

On June 9, 2024, Pillar reunited in Broken Arrow, OK, for their first concert in over a decade, and was filmed for an upcoming documentary. The documentary, Pillar: Beyond the Frontline, was announced to premier on October 12, 2025.

== Members ==
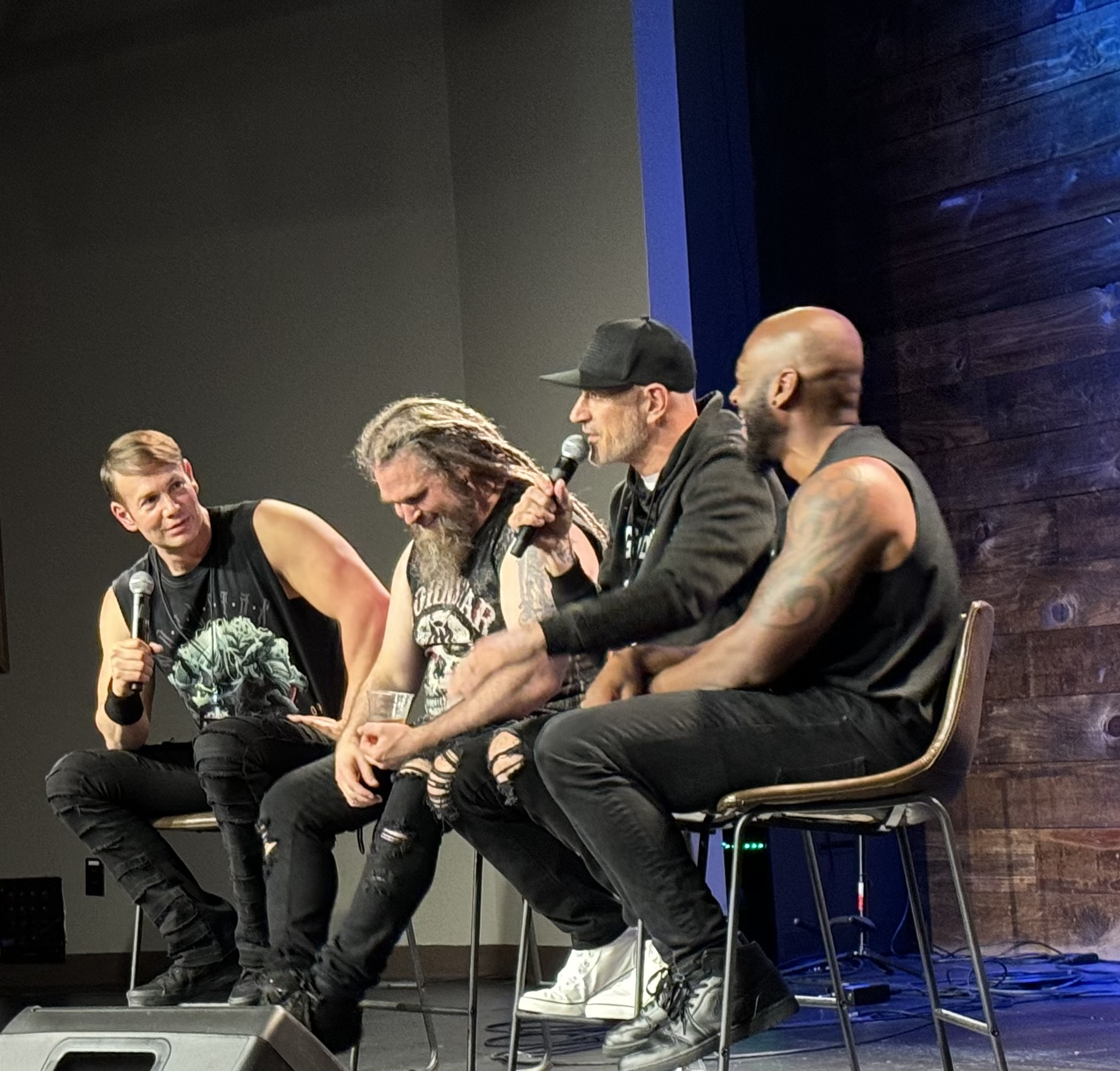
Pillar at VIP meet and greet in Broken Arrow in June 2024

Current members

- Rob Beckley – lead vocals (1998–present), rhythm guitar (2008–present)
- Michael "Kalel" Wittig (Stars Go Dim) – bass (1998–2008, 2012–present)
- Noah Henson – lead guitar, backing vocals (2001–present)
- Lester Estelle II (Stars Go Dim, Kelly Clarkson, Black & White) – drums, backing vocals (2002–2008, 2012–present)

Current touring members

- J.R. Bareis (Love and Death, Spoken) – guitar, backing vocals (2024–present) – joined as second guitarist for the 2024 tours

Former members

- Taylor Carroll – drums (2009–2011)
- Brad Noone – drums (1998–2002)
- Travis Jenkins – guitar (1999–2001; studio 2012)
- Dustin Adams – guitar (1998–1999)
- Rich Gilliand – bass (2008–2011)

Former touring members

- Joey Avalos – guitar, backing vocals (2006–2007) – filled in as second guitarist during "The Reckoning" era
- James Holloway – drums (2008) – filled in for Lester on Creation Festival tour
- Josh Gleave – bass (2008) – filled in for Kalel on for the Love of the Fan tour
- Chase Lovelace – drums (2008–2009) – filled in for Lester for short time until Taylor joined the band; Chase then joined Superchick

Timeline

== Discography ==
- 1999 Metamorphosis [independent album]
- 2000 Original Superman [independent album] (12 tracks. 11 tracks re-released on Above.)
- 2000 Above Album
- 2002 Fireproof
- 2004 Where Do We Go from Here
- 2006 The Reckoning
- 2008 For the Love of the Game
- 2009 Confessions
- 2015 One Love Revolution

== Awards and nominations ==
=== Dove Awards ===
Year	Nominee / work	Award	Result	Ref.
2001	Above	Hard Music Album of the Year	Won	
2001	"Open Your Eyes"	Hard Music Recorded Song of the Year	Nominated	
2002	"Live for Him"	Hard Music Recorded Song of the Year	Won	
2003	Fireproof	Hard Music Album of the Year	Won	
2003	"Fireproof"	Hard Music Recorded Song of the Year	Nominated	
2009	"For the Love of the Game"	Hard Music Recorded Song of the Year	Nominated	
2009	For The Love of The Game	Hard Music Album of the Year	Nominated	

=== Grammy Awards ===
Year	Nominee / work	Award	Result	Ref.
2008	The Reckoning	Best Rock or Rap Gospel Album	Nominated	§

== Related bands and side projects ==
- Godspeed (1992–1994): In high school, Michael Wittig (Kalel) was the founding member of the band Godspeed. They had one self-titled album that was recorded December 1993 and released in a limited edition of 200 cassettes in January 1994. It contains three tracks: "Searching", "Your Life", both written by Wittig, and "Her Tears", written by Robert Brouhard and Wittig. The band's name changed from Q: The Source (named after the Q source) to Godspeed during the recording of the EP. Band members at the time of the recording included: Wittig on guitar and bass, Brouhard on vocals, Mahlon Tobias on bass, and David Shawn Valcárcel on drums.
- Stars Go Dim (2007–present) was first a side project and later a full-time band that Lester Estelle Jr., Michael Wittig were a part of. Sweet Memorial's frontman, Chris Cleveland, is the lead singer. With SGD Estelle and Wittig released a full-length album, Love Gone Mad (2009), and two EPs: self-titled (2008) and Between Here and Now (2011).
- Éowyn's 2008 song "Silent Screams" features Rob Beckley on guest vocals. Also Lester and Noah appear on the record adding talents on drums and guitar.
