= Fireproof (Pillar album) =

Studio album by Pillar
- Released: May 21, 2002
- Recorded: 2002
- Genres: Nu metal, rap metal, hard rock
- Length: 38:43
- Labels: Flicker, MCA
- Producer: Murdock

Pillar chronology
Above (2000)	Fireproof (2002)	Broken Down: The EP (2003)

Singles from Fireproof
- 1. "Fireproof" Released: 2003; 2. "Indivisible" Released: 2003; 3. "A Shame" Released: 2003; 4. "Echelon" Released: 2003

2003 remaster cover

Fireproof is the second studio album by American Christian rock band Pillar, released in May 2002. It is their most successful, having sold over 300,000 copies. It is the first album by the band to feature guitarist Noah Henson.

The album was released in at least three different versions, including a remixed version and a limited special edition that came with Pillar's All Day Every Day DVD and a slipcase. The track listings from the original and the reissue are very similar, rearranging the track listing a little and retitling the tracks "Just 2 Get By" to "Just to Get By" and "Further" to "Further from Myself".

The title track, "Fireproof", reached #39 on the Billboard Mainstream Rock Airplay chart. It was also featured in the baseball video game MLB 2005 and on its soundtrack CD release.

== Track listing ==
Original 2002 release

1. "Fireproof" – 3:46
2. "Just to Get By" – 4:17
3. "Echelon" – 3:25
4. "Stay Up" (feat. KJ-52) – 3:40
5. "Behind Closed Doors" – 2:55
6. "Epidemic" – 3:14
7. "Hindsight" – 2:57
8. "Light at My Feet" – 3:28
9. "A Shame" – 3:17
10. "Indivisible" – 3:20
11. "Further" – 4:24

2003 remixed/remastered version

1. "Fireproof" – 3:46
2. "Behind Closed Doors" – 2:57
3. "A Shame" – 3:19
4. "Echelon" – 3:51
5. "Hindsight" – 2:59
6. "Light at My Feet" – 3:29
7. "Stay Up" (feat. KJ-52) – 3:32
8. "Epidemic" – 3:17
9. "Just to Get By" – 3:30
10. "Indivisible" – 3:24
11. "Further from Myself" – 4:28
12. "Fireproof [Radio Mix]" - 3:47

== Reception ==
Professional ratings
Review scores
Source	Rating
AllMusic	3/5 stars
CCM Magazine	A−
Christianity Today	3.5/5 stars
Cross Rhythms	9/10 stars
Jesus Freak Hideout	3.5/5 stars

Fireproof garnered generally positive reception from five music critics. At CCM Magazine, Kevin Breuner graded the album an A−, saying that due to the high quality of the release the band should have a long future, and they are staking out their own "musical territory" on an album that comes with "Layers of interesting guitar work and well-crafted songs help take Fireproof beyond the typical power chords and guitar riffs that can become cliché to the genre." Founder Tony Cummings of Cross Rhythms rated the album a nine out of a ten, stating that "Many of the lyrics here derive from Daniel 3 and with Pillar's call to radical commitment to Christ the melodic hooks, rapid syllable rapping and high octane drumming make this one of the best examples of commercial hard music you are likely to hear this year." At Christianity Today, Russ Breimeier rated the album three-and-a-half stars, calling it "a well-made project from everyone involved in its production". Founder John DiBiase of Jesus Freak Hideout rated the album three-and-a-half stars, writing that the release is "Maybe not innovative or anything all too original or new, [but] Fireproof is still a leap in the right direction for this young group." At AllMusic, Alex Henderson rated the album three stars, affirming that the release "isn't innovative", however noting that "there is a lot to like about this solid, if derivative, CD".
