= Misguided =

Studio album by Argyle Park
- Released: March 21, 1995
- Recorded: Circle Studio, New York City; Moonsong Studio, Riverside, California
- Genres: Industrial metal; electronic rock; punk rock; techno
- Length: 65:40
- Labels: R.E.X. Records; FiXT Music (remaster)
- Producer: Celldweller

Argyle Park chronology
Misguided (1995)	Suspension of Disbelief (2000)

Circle of Dust chronology
Brainchild (Remastered) (2016)	Misguided (Remastered) (2016)	Disengage (Remastered) (2016)

Professional ratings
Review scores
Source	Rating
Cross Rhythms	9/10 stars
Matt Morrow	6.5/10 stars
The Phantom Tollbooth	4.5/5 stars

Misguided is Argyle Park's only album under that name. The album was released in 1995 by R.E.X. Records into the Christian rock market, and sits alongside other early 90s work by Circle of Dust and Mortal as being instrumental in introducing industrial music to the Christian music scene. The album was nominated for Best Metal/Hard Rock Album at the 27th Annual GMA Dove Awards in 1996.

Misguided is a diverse album that combines elements such as techno, metal guitar, ragtime piano, horns, samples, and dark vocals. Members cited influences such as Portishead and jazz being responsible for the experimentation on the album. It also features a wide variety of guest appearances by other alternative Christian bands and mainstream industrial bands of the mid 90s. The lyrics generally center around themes of betrayal, bitterness, and emotional pain, with band members and associates at various times hinting that the album was acting as catharsis for a child abuse situation at the church they all attended while growing up. The resultant thematic darkness of the album caused its reception to be mixed, with many Christian listeners protesting the lack of positive content, even going so far as to call it "anti-Christian". R.E.X. themselves attempted to censor the band before the album's release, deeming the outro verse of the song "Doomsayer" as being too controversial and cutting it from the song. The band, however, inserted the cut snippet onto the end of the album master tape before R.E.X. noticed and the outro now appears as a hidden track at the very end of the CD. The controversy and backlash caused the band members to shut Argyle Park down two years after conception.

Tommy Victor of Prong wrote the main riff for the song "Doomsayer", and later used this same riff in the Prong song "Controller". Originally released on R.E.X. Records, the album was re-issued as a limited run in 2005 by Retroactive Records with bonus tracks, additional booklet information, and enhanced ROM material on the disc.

== Track listing ==
No.	Title	Lyrics	Music	Guest artist(s)	Length
1.	"Refuge"	Buka	Argyle Park	J. G. Thirlwell	1:13
2.	"Headscrew"	Dred, Deathwish, King Salomon, Buka	Argyle Park	Christy Sweet, Celldweller, King Salomon, Klank	4:57
3.	"Agony"	Celldweller	Argyle Park	Gyro, Dirk Lemmenes, Jeff Bellew, Ted Cookerly, Alabama King Fish	5:15
4.	"Futile"		Argyle Park	Keith Corp	1:41
5.	"Scarred for Life"	Dred, Celldweller	Dred		4:18
6.	"A Burden's Folly"	Buka	Buka, Deathwish, Dred, Celldweller		2:29
7.	"Circle"	Deathwish	Deathwish	Christy Sweet	3:04
8.	"Leave Me Alone"	Dred, Lauren Boquette	Argyle Park	Lauren Boquette, Marco Forcone, Alabama King Fish	5:31
9.	"Violent"	Deathwish, Dred	Deathwish, Dred	Evol Eye Jeni, Celldweller	4:29
10.	"Diesel"		Argyle Park		1:02
11.	"Gutterboy (I Am I Am)"	Buka, Dred	Dred	Jeff Bellew, Dirk Lemmenes, King Salomon	4:00
12.	"Og"		Og	Og	1:19
13.	"Misanthrope"		Buka, Dred		4:37
14.	"Skin Shed"	Dred, Celldweller, Tommy Victor	Deathwish, Dred	Tommy Victor, Celldweller	2:19
15.	"Skin Shed"	Dred, Celldweller, Tommy Victor	Deathwish, Dred	Tommy Victor, Celldweller	2:28
16.	"Skin Shed"	Dred, Celldweller, Tommy Victor	Deathwish, Dred	Tommy Victor, Celldweller	2:47
17.	"Doomsayer"	King Salomon, Buka	Argyle Park, Tommy Victor	King Salomon, Tommy Victor	4:23
18.	"Uffern"		Deathwish		4:51
26.	"[Untitled]"				1:58
29.	"[Untitled]"				1:47
34.	"[Untitled]"				0:59

Note: Following track 18, there are 3 hidden tracks and 13 silent tracks. The final hidden track, Track 34, is a spoken word piece intended as the true ending to the song "Doomsayer".

2016 Remastered Re-release: Disc 1
No.	Title	Length
1.	"Refuge" (feat. JG Thirlwell)	1:13
2.	"Headscrew" (feat. Klank & Mark Salomon)	4:57
3.	"Agony" (feat. Jyro)	5:14
4.	"Futile"	1:40
5.	"Scarred for Life" (feat. Celldweller)	4:17
6.	"A Burden's Folly"	2:28
7.	"Circle" (Redux)	3:22
8.	"Leave Me Alone" (feat. Drown)	5:31
9.	"Violent" (feat. Circle of Dust)	4:34
10.	"Diesel"	1:02
11.	"Gutterboy" (feat. Chatterbox)	4:04
12.	"og"	1:11
13.	"Misanthrope"	4:44
14.	"Skin Shed" (feat. Circle of Dust & Tommy Victor)	7:36
15.	"Doomsayer" (feat. Mark Salomon & Tommy Victor)	4:23
16.	"Uffern"	4:44
Total length:		01:01:00

2016 Remastered Re-release: Disc 2
No.	Title	Length
1.	"Fanny Pack" (feat. Blue Stahli & Mark Salomon)	3:55
2.	"The Communist Masters of Deceit"	5:14
3.	"Lonely" (Stryper cover)	5:08
4.	"Fanny Pack vs Doomsayer" (feat. Blue Stahli & Mark Salomon)	3:37
5.	"og's Revenge"	1:31
6.	"Leave Me Alone" (Klayton Vocal Demo)	5:28
7.	"Violent" (Demo)	4:28
8.	"Resurrection of the Ravens" (1992 4-Track Cassette Demo; feat. Circle of Dust & lvl)	4:17
9.	"The Conversation"	1:38
10.	"A Burden's Folly" (Instrumental Demo)	2:28
11.	"Diesel" (Instrumental Demo)	0:56
12.	"Leave Me Alone" (Instrumental Demo)	5:50
13.	"Skin Shed" (Instrumental Demo)	6:57
14.	"Doomsayer" (Instrumental Demo)	3:45
15.	"Once Great Leaders"	0:59
Total length:		55:50

2016 Remastered Re-release: Disc 3
No.	Title	Length
1.	"Refuge" (Acapella)	0:58
2.	"Fanny Pack" (Instrumental)	3:54
3.	"The Communist Masters of Deceit" (Instrumental)	5:14
4.	"Headscrew" (Instrumental)	4:57
5.	"Agony" (Instrumental)	5:15
6.	"Scarred for Life" (Instrumental)	4:17
7.	"Circle" (Redux; instrumental)	3:23
8.	"Gutterboy" (Instrumental)	4:05
9.	"Doomsayer" (No Guitar or Bass)	3:57
10.	"Agony" (Instrumental - No Guitar)	5:16
11.	"Scarred for Life" (Instrumental - No Guitar)	4:17
Total length:		45:13

=== Vinyl pressing ===
There were only four pressings of the album on vinyl (technically acetates), all of which were given to members of the band. One of these acetates was eventually purchased by a fan, who confirmed on the (now-defunct) FiXT Forums that the vinyl edition of the album contains a bonus track, named "Babylon", which is not on the CD version of Misguided. This same song ended up being included on Klay Scott's 1998 Circle of Dust album Disengage, and presumably would have been one of the songs included on Buka's Backwoods Records compilation.

== Release history ==
Label	Date	Format	Catalog	Notes
R.E.X. Music	1994	compact disc	REX 410172–2	
R.E.X. Music	1995	stereo LP acetate	REX 46013–1	Only four (white label) copies pressed for the band
R.E.X. Music	1995	compact disc		Repressed for R.E.X.'s new distribution deal
Retroactive Records	2004	compact disc	RAR7787	Enhanced disc with text notes and images
FiXT Music	2016	compact disc and digital download		3-CD deluxe edition with remastered mix and many bonus tracks (remastered b-sides, instrumentals, and early demos)

== Contributors ==
Most of the contributors to Misguided appeared under aliases or alternate spellings of their commonly known names. Their real identities, if known, are listed here.

=== Main members ===
- Buka: alias of Chris Martello, at the time a producer at MTV Sports.
- Deathwish and Dred: aliases of Klayton, who also produced the album using the name Celldweller

=== Guest appearances ===
- Jim Thirlwell of Foetus, Wiseblood, Steroid Maximus, and Manorexia - narration on "Refuge"
- Klank: Daren Diolosa of Circle of Dust, Klank, and Left Out - vocals on "Headscrew"
- Gyro: Jyro Xhan of Mortal and Fold Zandura - vocals and shouts on "Agony"
- Tedd Cookerly, of Every Day Life - shouts on "Agony"
- Lauren Boquette of Drown - vocals on "Leave Me Alone"
- Marco Forcone of Drown - extra percussion on "Leave Me Alone"
- Tommy Victor of Prong, Teenage Time Killers, Ministry, Danzig, and Tapeworm - vocals on "Skin Shed", guitar and bass on "Doomsayer"
- King Salomon: Mark Salomon of Stavesacre, The Crucified, Neon Horse, White Lighter - vocals on "Headscrew", "Doomsayer" and "Fanny Pack"
- Dirk Lemmenes of Focused and Stavesacre - shouts on "Agony", vocals on "Gutterboy (I Am I Am)"
- Jeff Bellew of CHATTERBoX, Stavesacre, and The Crucified - shouts on "Agony", vocals on "Gutterboy"
- Evol Eye Jeni: Jeni of Sill - vocals on "Violent"
- Keith Corp - horns on "Futile"
- Christy Sweet - vocals on "Headscrew" and "Circle"
- Alabama King Fish: Chris Donahue of Circle of Dust and Vigilantes of Love - bass on "Agony", piano on "Leave Me Alone"
- Og: John Lopez of Circle of Dust - performer and writer of "Og"
- Blue Stahli - performer on "Fanny Pack" (2016 remaster)

=== Recording personnel ===
- Celldweller - Producer, audio engineer, mixing engineer
- Vin Syrek - Mixing engineer, digital editing
- Bob Moon - Engineering
- Duncan Standbury - Mastering
- Jeff - Album artwork
