= Suspension of Disbelief (album) =

Studio album by AP2
- Released: June 27, 2000
- Genres: Industrial metal, avant-garde, thrash metal, techno
- Length: 50:32
- Label: Tooth & Nail Records
- Producer: Klayton

AP2 chronology
Misguided (1994)	Suspension of Disbelief (2000)

Professional ratings
Review scores
Source	Rating
Cross Rhythms	10/10
The Phantom Tollbooth	4/5 stars

Suspension of Disbelief is the lone release by American supergroup AP2, put out by Tooth & Nail Records in 2000. AP2 was a "sequel" to the band Argyle Park, who released their only album Misguided in 1994. Argyle Park consisted of Buka and Klayton, while AP2 featured primary players Buka and Level, with Klayton producing the record. In the winter of 2000, Tooth & Nail cut AP2 due to the low sales of this album. Since Buka had only wanted AP2 to release albums for Tooth & Nail, AP2 ended as a band after Tooth & Nail dropped them.

Suspension of Disbelief is every bit as experimental as its precursor, including elements of gabber techno, dance-pop, drum and bass, ambient techno, R&B, punk rock, and metal. The opening track, "The End", contains vocal samples from two of the old Argyle Park songs, giving the album some sense of closure to that era of the band before diving headlong into the new material.

== Track listing ==
1. "The End" (Level, Buka) – 4:40
  - samples: "Leave Me Alone" and "A Burden's Folly" by Argyle Park
2. "Heroin Hate" (Level, Buka) – 5:32
3. "My Sympathies" (Klayton, Mark Salomon, Buka, Level) – 5:26
  - guest vocals: Mark Salomon, Klayton
4. "A Thousand Terrible Things" (Level, Buka) – 2:26
5. "Silhouette of Rage" (Level, Buka) – 3:58
  - guest vocals: Daren "Klank" Diolosa
6. "A New Wound" (Level) – 5:54
7. "The Red Shirt Conspiracy" (Level, Buka, Joel Timothy Bell) – 2:36
  - guest vocals: Joel Timothy Bell
8. "The Pact" (Level, Buka) – 5:05
  - vocals: Sage
9. "Resurrection of the Ravens" (Klayton, Level) – 4:14
  - guest vocals: Klayton
10. "Goodbye" (Level) – 4:46
11. "The Only Man I Know" (Level) – 4:22
  - drums: J.M. Zaletel
12. "Cold Breath of Sorrow" (Level, Buka) – 1:32

== Guest appearances ==
- Klayton – producer of album and writer of songs "My Sympathies" and "Resurrection of the Ravens"
- Daren "Klank" Diolosa of Klank, Circle of Dust, and Left Out
- Mark Salomon of Stavesacre and The Crucified
- Joel Timothy Bell of Ghoti Hook
- Sage
- J.M. Zaletel of Klank
