= Argyle Park =

American industrial rock band

- Origin: New York City, New York, U.S.
- Genres: Electronic rock; punk rock; industrial metal; techno
- Years active: 1994–1996, 1998–2000
- Labels: R.E.X., Tooth & Nail, FiXT
- Past members: Klayton (a.k.a. Dread, Deathwish); Buka; Dan Levler

Argyle Park was an underground industrial rock supergroup founded in New York City in 1994 and active until 1996. Members of the group reformed under the name AP2 in 1998, and were active under that name until winter 2000. Signed to Christian music labels, the band suffered repeated controversies within the Christian music scene for not being positive and evangelistic enough in its lyrics and outlook as well as for including contributions from non-Christian musicians. The project was named after an actual park in Babylon, Long Island, where the members of Argyle Park grew up together.

== History ==
=== Argyle Park ===
Argyle Park first appeared on a tribute album to 80s contemporary Christian music iconoclast Steve Taylor in 1994. The full-length Argyle Park album, Misguided, was released later that year on R.E.X. Records. The album was musically varied, combining elements such as techno, metal guitar, ragtime piano, horns, samples, and dark vocals and was credited in the liner notes to three pseudonymous individuals: Dred, Deathwish, and Buka. Dred, Deathwish, and Celldweller, another individual credited as the album's producer, were all aliases for Scott Albert of the underground industrial metal band Circle of Dust. Buka was the alias for Chris Martello, at the time a producer for MTV Sports. Misguided also featured a myriad of guest appearances from the Christian alternative music scene, as well as several from cult-status mainstream industrial rock bands of the time. These appearances include Mark Salomon (Stavesacre, The Crucified), Dirk Lemmenes (Focused, Stavesacre), Jeff Bellew (Stavesacre, The Crucified, Chatterbox), Jim Thirlwell (Foetus), Klank, Jyro Xhan (Mortal), Tommy Victor (Prong), Chris Donohue (Vigilantes of Love), and Lauren Boquette and Marco Forcone (Drown).

In the summer of 1995, Argyle Park made their only live appearance at the Cornerstone Music Festival in Bushnell, Illinois. The musicians onstage included Dan Leveler, who would later become a full member of AP2 under the alias Level. Argyle Park made one more recorded appearance in 1996, this time with a song on a tribute album to Stryper. Then the band announced that they were shutting down. In a later interview, Scott Albert cited clashes with R.E.X. over lyrical content, unrealistic expectations within the Christian music industry, and negative or "holier-than-thou" fan reactions to lyrical content as reasons for shutting down both Argyle Park and his main music project, Circle of Dust. In a different interview, Buka also described much of the negative reactions Argyle Park faced from within the Christian music scene.

==== Backwoods ====
In 1996, Buka had planned to start up his own record label called Backwoods Records. The first release was to be a split album that would feature songs by Klank, Buka's new project Soil, and Argyle Park. However, the record label and the split album never saw the light of day. A single song attributed to a band called Backwoods was then released later in 1996 on a Christmas compilation put out by Flying Tart Records. The two members of Backwoods were Buka and Level, thus pointing the way to the resurrection of Argyle Park in 1998.

=== AP2 ===
Argyle Park "reopened" in 1999 under the name AP2, signing to alternative Christian music label Tooth & Nail Records. AP2 released one album called Suspension of Disbelief in 2000. Scott Albert, now using the name Klayton, produced the album and wrote only two of the songs while his younger brother, Level, did the bulk of the actual song crafting and Buka provided thematic direction for the project. Guest appearances were made once more, but not nearly as numerously as on Misguided: Klank returned, as did Mark Salomon, and Joel Timothy Bell of the Tooth & Nail punk band Ghoti Hook also provided some vocals. The music on Suspension of Disbelief was just as varied as that on Misguided, with the band this time experimenting with gabber techno, pop dance, drum'n'bass, R&B, punk rock, and metal. The members planned to keep the project open and release additional albums, but again shut down later in 2000, this time due to low sales through Tooth & Nail and a resurgence of the criticisms that dogged the band the first time around.

== Reception and controversy ==
Argyle Park courted controversy from the time of their first appearance, on the Steve Taylor tribute album, being criticized for their subtle changing of the meaning of the song by way of leaving out significant portions of Taylor's original lyrics. Though signed to a Christian record label, Argyle Park did not display any overtly religious themes on their album. The lyrics rather dealt with things such as suffering, pain, bitterness, violent emotions, being betrayed and taken advantage of, and losing faith in one's role models, themes summed up by Buka as "man putting too much faith in other men and men will always let you down". In so doing, Argyle Park flouted the general expectation within the Christian music industry that bands will be positive and evangelistic. This, along with the generally dark image of the band, led to much of the criticism that Argyle Park faced from within the underground Christian music scene and music press. Listeners heavily and openly criticized the band and band members in online message boards and via email, causing the members personal insult to the point that they disbanded.

These same issues arose again when the band reformed as AP2. The members expressed disappointment, puzzlement, and frustration at the constant criticism of Argyle Park, which they said came only from within the Christian music scene, but were never apologetic, stating "there are enough fluff bands out there anyway [...] We're writing about real issues that have a real impact" and even anticipated the return of these criticisms with the release of AP2's album. Online debates and slander continued long after the disbanding of AP2, causing former members to occasionally post angry retorts and chastisements on the message boards and, if one post by Buka was to be believed, caused the band to scrap a proposed tenth anniversary remix project in 2004.

Apart from all the controversies surrounding both incarnations of Argyle Park, however, their albums have been massively popular within the genre and subgenres of Christian industrial and electronic music. A wide variety of bands that have appeared on the scene have cited Argyle Park and AP2 as influences in their biographies and press releases. Tribute albums have been proposed at various times, with at least a handful of cover songs recorded. The more recent success of Klayton's Celldweller has also resulted in renewed interest in his older projects, including both Argyle Park albums.

== Members ==
Note that Argyle Park included numerous guest contributors. Only core members of the band are listed here.

- Klayton (a.k.a. Dread, Deathwish)
- Chris "Buka" Martello
- Dan Levler

== Discography ==
Albums

Year	Album	Label
1994 (remastered in 2016 on FiXT Music)	Misguided	R.E.X.
2000	Suspension of Disbelief (as AP2)	Tooth & Nail Records

Compilation appearances

- I Predict a Clone: A Steve Taylor Tribute (1994, R.E.X. Records, tribute to Steve Taylor) - "Drive, He Said (D-Wee Dub)"
- Demo-lition II (1994, R.E.X. Records) - "Misanthrope 5:33" (slightly altered edit of the album track "Misanthrope")
- Can You Dig It? III (1994, R.E.X. Records) - "Misanthrope 5:33"
- R.E.X. '95 Sampler 3 (1995, R.E.X. Records)- "Doomsayer" (mislabeled as Gutterboy)
- Doom & Gloom: Visions of the Apocalypse (1995, Nesak International) - "Misanthrope" (album version)
- Sweet Family Music: A Tribute to Stryper (1996, Flaying Tart Records, tribute to Stryper) - "Lonely (Two-Timing Dub)"
- Cheapskates: Harder Side (1999, Tooth & Nail Records) - "My Sympathies (Rough Mix)"
- Though uncredited, short segments of two AP2 songs were used in the Hollywood film The Butterfly Effect.
