= Machines of Our Disgrace =

Studio album by Circle of Dust
- Released: December 9, 2016; February 10, 2017 (Instrumentals); September 19, 2025 (Definitive Edition), January 2, 2026 (Single Edits).
- Recorded: 2015–2016
- Genre: Industrial metal; thrash metal; electronic rock
- Length: 62:10
- Label: FiXT Music
- Producer: Klayton

Circle of Dust chronology
Disengage (Remastered) (2016)	Machines of Our Disgrace (2016)

Singles from Machines of Our Disgrace
- 1. "Contagion" Released: February 16, 2016; 2. "Neophyte" Released: March 5, 2016; 3. "Machines of Our Disgrace" Released: July 29, 2016

Singles from Machines of Our Disgrace (Definitive Edition)
- 1. "Dust to Dust" Released: December 1, 2017; 2. "Invisible World" Released: August 22, 2025

Professional ratings
Review scores
Source	Rating
ReGen Magazine	5/5 stars
Sputnikmusic	3.5/5 stars
Noizze	(favourable)
Soundscape Magazine	8/10 stars

Machines of Our Disgrace is the fourth studio album by American industrial metal project Circle of Dust, released on December 9, 2016, through Klayton's own label, FiXT Music. The album is the first new material released under Circle of Dust since Disengage.

== Background and release ==
In late 2015, Klayton reclaimed the rights to the Circle of Dust moniker, along with all original masters and demos, he announced plans to release remastered versions of all three albums, along with Metamorphosis and Misguided, and finally, a new album. On February 16, 2016, Klayton released the first song from the new album, "Contagion", as a free download.

From March 4, 2016, all five remasters were released, eight weeks apart, with Circle of Dust, Brainchild and Disengage all including songs from the upcoming album, due to be released in December that year. On October 28, Klayton finally announced that the new album, Machines of Our Disgrace, would be released on December 9, 2016.

== Themes ==
The album serves as a critique of scientific and technological advancements, ranging from cyberpsychology ("Machines of Our Disgrace", "Contagion", "Hive Mind"), human enhancement ("alt_Human", "Neurachem") and social darwinism ("Humanarchy").

== Track listing ==
All tracks are written by Klayton.

No.	Title	Length
1.	"re_Engage"	1:20
2.	"Machines of Our Disgrace"	5:25
3.	"Contagion"	5:25
4.	"Embracing Entropy" (featuring Celldweller)	6:53
5.	"Humanarchy"	5:00
6.	"Signal"	0:30
7.	"alt_Human"	5:00
8.	"Hive Mind"	5:57
9.	"Outside In"	6:15
10.	"Neurachem"	4:44
11.	"k_OS"	3:30
12.	"Neophyte"	6:00
13.	"Malacandra"	6:03

Machines of Our Disgrace (Definitive Edition)

All tracks are written by Klayton.

No.	Title	Length
1.	"re_Engage"	1:20
2.	"Machines of Our Disgrace"	5:25
3.	"Contagion"	5:25
4.	"Embracing Entropy" (featuring Celldweller)	6:53
5.	"Humanarchy"	5:00
6.	"Signal"	0:30
7.	"alt_Human"	5:00
8.	"Hive Mind"	5:57
9.	"Outside In"	6:15
10.	"Neurachem"	4:44
11.	"k_OS"	3:30
12.	"Neophyte"	6:00
13.	"Malacandra"	6:03
14.	"Invisible World"	5:04
15.	"Dust to Dust"	5:49
16.	"Digital Messiah"	4:06
17.	"Drum Machines of Our Disgrace"	3:20
18.	"Contagion (Sebastian Komor Remix)"	4:28
19.	"Hive Mind (The Anix Remix)"	4:19
20.	"Embracing Entropy (feat. Celldweller) [The Plague Remix]"	5:15
21.	"Dust to Dust (Zardonic Remix)"	4:29
22.	"Neurachem (Voicians Remix)"	4:54

Machines of Our Disgrace (Single Edits)

All tracks are written by Klayton.

No.	Title	Length
1.	"re_Engage"	1:20
2.	"Machines of Our Disgrace (Single Edit)"	3:52
3.	"Contagion (Single Edit)"	3:40
4.	"Embracing Entropy (Single Edit)" (featuring Celldweller)	4:08
5.	"Humanarchy (Single Edit)"	3:40
6.	"Signal"	0:30
7.	"alt_Human (Single Edit)"	3:53
8.	"Hive Mind (Single Edit)"	4:31
9.	"Outside In (Single Edit)"	3:37
10.	"Neurachem (Single Edit)"	3:20
11.	"k_OS"	3:30
12.	"Neophyte (Single Edit)"	3:54
13.	"Malacandra (Single Edit)"	3:41

== Personnel ==
Circle of Dust

- Klayton – vocals, synthesizers, guitar, bass guitar, percussion, songwriting, production, mixing, editing, mastering, programming

Additional personnel

- Ninja Jo – artwork

== Charts ==
Chart (2016)	Peak position
US Top Heatseekers (Billboard)	20

Chart (2018)	Peak position
US Top Heatseekers (Billboard)	8
US Independent Albums (Billboard)	31
