= Brainchild =

Brainchild may refer to:

- Brainchild (band), a local supergroup from Youngstown, Ohio, 1969–1972
- Brainchild (Society of Soul album), 1996
- Brainchild (Circle of Dust album), 1994
- Fictional comic characters in the Marvel Universe:
  - Brainchild (comics)
  - Brain-Child,
- Brainchild, a project related to the industrial band Circle of Dust
- Brainchild, a 1981 novel by Andrew Neiderman
- Brainchild (TV series)

== See also ==
- Idea, colloquially referred to as a "brainchild"
