= Fathom (album) =

Studio album by Mortal
- Released: 1993
- Genre: Industrial, dance-rock, CCM
- Length: 57:39
- Label: Intense/Frontline
- Producer: Terry Scott Taylor/Mortal

Mortal chronology
Lusis (1992)	Fathom (1993)	Intense Records Presents: Recorded Live, Vol. 5 (1993)

Professional ratings
Review scores
Source	Rating
AllMusic	4.5/5 stars
Cross Rhythms (Lusis/Fathom dual album)	8/10 stars

Fathom is the second album by Christian dance-rock band Mortal, and is generally considered the band's best album. The band produced the album along with Terry Scott Taylor of Daniel Amos. It peaked at No. 32 on the Billboard Top Contemporary Christian chart.

== Track listing ==
1. Alive and Awake 5:42
2. Ne Plus Ultra 4:17
3. Rift 4:22
4. Jill Sent Me 7:01
5. Ex-Nihilo 5:16
6. Above and Beyond 4:38
7. [Silent track] 0:05
8. Rainlight 1:34
9. Bright Wings 6:48 (an adaptation of Gerard Manley Hopkins poem "God's Grandeur")
10. Xix 0:15
11. Promulgate 4:18
12. Electrify 7:06
13. Godspeed 6:17

== Personnel ==
- Jyro Xhan
- Jerome Fontamillas
- Mark Salomon - vocals
- Jeff Bellew - guitar
- Melissa "Missy" Hasin - cello
- Andrew D. Prickett - guitar
- Strobe - guitar
- Ray Tongpo - vocals
- Macauley N. Tosh - drums, percussion
- Violet - vocals
- Mark A. Rodriguez - engineer
- Lani Agulla
- Linnah Brockman
- Sally Grayson
- Vicky Pederson
