= Suspension of Disbelief =

Suspension of disbelief is a willingness to suspend one's critical faculties and believe something surreal; sacrifice of realism and logic for the sake of enjoyment.

Suspension of Disbelief may refer to:

- Suspension of Disbelief (album)
- Suspension of Disbelief (film)
