= Neon Horse =

American rock band

- Origin: Los Angeles, California, U.S.
- Genres: Indie rock, post-punk, gothic rock
- Years active: 2007–2009, 2024–present
- Labels: Tooth & Nail
- Past members: Mark Salomon; Jason Martin; Steven Dail

Neon Horse is an American rock band from Los Angeles, California, formed by Mark Salomon, Jason Martin and Steven Dail. They were previously signed to Tooth & Nail Records with whom they have released two studio albums. Neon Horse's sound has been described as being influenced by the music of the 1980s.

== Members ==
Stavesacre lead singer Mark Salomon and Starflyer 59 founder Jason Martin wrote all songs on the band's self-titled debut album. The September 2007 issue of Alternative Press states, "[Y]ou'll notice that you never see them in the same room at the same time with members of Stavesacre, Starflyer 59 and Joy Electric."

On April 10, 2008, Neon Horse performed live at the House of Blues in Anaheim. Mark Salomon (of Stavesacre) was the singer, Jason Martin (of Starflyer 59) played guitar, and Steven Dail (of Project 86 and Crash Rickshaw) played bass.

On July 28, 2009, their second album, Haunted Horse: Songs of Love, Defiance, and Delusion, was made available for purchase in both mp3 and CD format.

As of 2011, Neon Horse's artist profile is no longer featured on the Tooth & Nail Records' current artists page. In 2024 the band released Habit of Creature, a four-song EP, on the Velvet Blue Music label.

== Members ==
Confirmed members

- Mark Salomon — vocals (Stavesacre, the Crucified, Argyle Park)
- Jason Martin — guitars, backing vocals (Starflyer 59, Dance House Children, the Brothers Martin)
- Steven Dail — bass (Project 86, Starflyer 59, Crash Rickshaw)
- Possibly Ronnie Martin — keyboards (Joy Electric, Dance House Children, and the Brothers Martin)

Session

- Alex Albert — drums (Project 86, Crash Rickshaw, Focused)

== Discography ==
Title	Release Date	Label
Neon Horse	2007	Tooth & Nail Records
Haunted Horse: Songs of Love, Defiance, and Delusion	2009	Tooth & Nail Records
Habit of Creature [EP]	2024	Velvet Blue Music

=== Music videos ===
- "Cuckoo!" — 2007
- "Strange Town" — 2009
