= Disengage (album) =

Studio album by Circle of Dust
- Released: 1998; October 14, 2016 (remaster)
- Genre: Industrial metal; industrial rock; electronic rock
- Length: 63:45
- Label: R.E.X. Records; FiXT Music (remaster)
- Producer: Klay Scott

Original chronology
| Circle of Dust (1995 version) (1995) | Disengage (1998) | Machines of Our Disgrace (2016) |

Remasters chronology
| Misguided (Remastered) (2016) | Disengaged (Remastered) (2016) |

Professional ratings
Review scores
| Source | Rating |
|---|---|
| Allmusic | 4/5 stars |

Disengage is the fourth studio album by American industrial rock band Circle of Dust, released in 1998, two years after the band was put on hiatus. This is their final piece of material before resurfacing in 2016 as a solo project.

== History ==
Klayton began to work on the album soon after a brief departure from Angeldust, a music/magic project he and Criss Angel collaborated on together. After Circle of Dust's contract with R.E.X. expired, Klayton took the project to Flying Tart Records. Seven remixes for "Chasm" and "Refractor" were produced. Klayton intended to release the remixes on a single separate CD entitled Circle of Dust – Refractor/Chasm Remixes; however, this attempt was shot down by the label and were instead inserted into the album. After completing Disengage and disbanding Circle of Dust, Klayton went on to work on his next project, Celldweller.

== Track listing ==
All tracks are written by Klay Scott.

| No. | Title | Length |
|---|---|---|
| 1. | "Waste of Time" | 4:13 |
| 2. | "Refractor" | 2:49 |
| 3. | "Yurasuka" | 3:32 |
| 4. | "Babylon" | 2:56 |
| 5. | "Chasm" | 4:11 |
| 6. | "Thulcandra" | 4:39 |
| 7. | "Blindeye" | 4:31 |
| 8. | "Mesmerized" | 6:25 |
| 9. | "Perelandra" | 3:45 |
| 10. | "You Are Fragile" | 5:05 |
| 11. | "Chasm" (Version 2.1.0.) | 4:49 |
| 12. | "Refractor" (Version 3.2.1.) | 4:49 |
| 13. | "Leveler 1 (Easier to Hate)" | 4:37 |
| 14. | "Hate Opened Wide" | 4:23 |
| 15. | "Leveler 2 (Alone to Die)" | 2:30 |
| 16. | "Deadly Love" (censored version) | 0:34 |
| Total length: | | 63:45 |

2016 Remastered Re-release: Disc 1
| No. | Title | Length |
|---|---|---|
| 1. | "Waste of Time" | 4:12 |
| 2. | "Refractor" | 2:48 |
| 3. | "Yurasuka" | 3:31 |
| 4. | "Babylon" | 2:55 |
| 5. | "Chasm" | 4:11 |
| 6. | "Thulcandra" | 4:39 |
| 7. | "Blindeye" | 4:30 |
| 8. | "Mesmerized" | 6:24 |
| 9. | "Perelandra" | 3:44 |
| 10. | "You Are Fragile" | 3:19 |
| 11. | "Disengage" | 4:12 |
| 12. | "Chasm" (Version 2.1.0) | 5:52 |
| 13. | "Refractor" (Version 3.2.1) | 4:47 |
| 14. | "Easier to Hate" (lvl Remix) | 4:35 |
| 15. | "Hate Opened Wide" | 4:21 |
| 16. | "Alone to Die" (lvl Remix) | 2:28 |
| 17. | "Deadly Love" (Uncensored) | 0:37 |
| Total length: | | 01:07:05 |

2016 Remastered Re-release: Disc 2
| No. | Title | Length |
|---|---|---|
| 1. | "Machines of Our Disgrace" | 5:25 |
| 2. | "Yurasuka" (Blue Stahli Remix) | 4:18 |
| 3. | "Your Noise" (1997) | 3:18 |
| 4. | "Resist" (1996) | 1:46 |
| 5. | "Goodbye" (1998) | 3:19 |
| 6. | "Waste of Time" (Acoustic) | 2:27 |
| 7. | "Yurstillasuka" | 3:08 |
| 8. | "Mesmerized" (Acoustic) | 6:33 |
| 9. | "Yurasuka" (Blue Stahli Remix; Instrumental) | 4:18 |
| 10. | "Mesmerized" (Instrumental) | 6:43 |
| 11. | "Your Noise" (Instrumental) | 3:17 |
| 12. | "Mesmerized" (Babylonian Flashback) | 3:21 |
| 13. | "Resist" (Instrumental) | 1:45 |
| 14. | "Waste of Time" (Acoustic; Instrumental) | 2:27 |
| Total length: | | 52:05 |

2016 Remastered Re-release: Disc 3
| No. | Title | Length |
|---|---|---|
| 1. | "Beneath the Skin" (Waste of Time Demo) | 4:05 |
| 2. | "Chasm" (Early Demo) | 1:43 |
| 3. | "Blindeye" (Demo) | 4:29 |
| 4. | "Chasm" (Late Demo) | 4:15 |
| 5. | "Refractor" (lvl Void Remix; Demo 1997) | 6:21 |
| 6. | "Chasm" (Version 2.1.0; Demo) | 5:52 |
| 7. | "Dust 29" | 1:35 |
| 8. | "Dust 30" | 2:06 |
| 9. | "Dust 31" | 1:55 |
| 10. | "Dust 32" | 0:55 |
| 11. | "Dust 33" | 0:46 |
| 12. | "Dust 34" | 1:28 |
| 13. | "Dust 35" | 0:54 |
| 14. | "Your Noise" (Clean) | 3:17 |
| 15. | "Deadly Love" (Censored) | 0:34 |
| Total length: | | 40:15 |

== Personnel ==
- Klay Scott – vocals, guitars, bass, drums, keyboards, samples, artwork, programming, recording, mixing, production
- Christy Sweet – additional vocals ("Chasm")
- Criss Angel – additional vocals ("Blindeye")
