= Nu-En-Jin =

Studio album by Mortal
- Released: October 8, 2002
- Recorded: March – April 2002
- Genres: Industrial, electronic rock, noise, pop
- Length: 49:09
- Label: Tooth & Nail
- Producers: Jyro Xhan, Jerome Fontamillas, Joey Belville

Mortal chronology
Godspeed (1998)	Nu-En-Jin (2002)

Professional ratings
Review scores
Source	Rating
Cross Rhythms	8/10 stars
AllMusic	4/5 stars
The Phantom Tollbooth	4/5 stars

Nu-En-Jin is a 2002 album by Christian industrial band Mortal, and was recorded by the band after a six-year hiatus.

== Track listing ==
1. tenn0 (4:39)
2. Mr Ar0chet (3:46)
3. Dymenshan [KR-Krik-P0p!] (4:05)
4. muj0 [Uncertainty mx] (4:56)
5. Vilan Corp [Spy mx] (3:39)
6. FMZ4 (3:59)
7. fl0ranclaude (4:47)
8. Teraferma (3:54)
9. cl0udburst (5:40)
10. myth0 ex [Green Edit] (4:49)
11. the W0rd is alive [Jer0mix] (4:50)

== Personnel ==
- Jyro Xhan
- Jerome Fontamillas - Engineer, Programming, Vocals
- Joe Anderson - Guitar
- Joey Belville - Cut, Editing, Mixing, Vocals
- Jon Foreman - Vocals
- Joe Marchiano - Drums
