= Pura (album) =

Studio album by Mortal
- Released: November 14, 1995
- Genre: Dance; alternative rock; worship; meditation
- Label: Intense/Frontline
- Producer: Mark A. Rodriguez

Mortal chronology
Wake (1994)	Pura (1995)	Mortal (1996)

Professional ratings
Review scores
Source	Rating
Cross Rhythms	9/10 stars

Mortal Presents: Pura is the fourth full-length studio album by Christian dance band Mortal. It is their final album with Intense/Frontline Records.

== Track listing ==
1. "Judah" – 5:24
2. "Grip" – 4:15
3. "Sand Starr" – 0:54
4. "Solamente" – 5:04
5. "Nightfall and Splendor" – 6:01
6. "Pura" – 7:25
7. "Liquid Gift" – 4:41
8. "Gaza" – 5:10
9. "Bells" – 4:15
10. "The Nightfall" – 4:06

== Personnel ==
- Jyro Xhan
- Jerome Fontamillas
