= Wake (Mortal album) =

Studio album by Mortal
- Released: 1995-06-07
- Genre: Alternative rock, hard rock, grunge, CCM
- Length: 51:43
- Label: Intense
- Producer: Mark A. Rodriguez

Mortal chronology
Intense Records Presents: Recorded Live, Vol. 5 (1993)	Wake (1995)	Pura (1995)

Professional ratings
Review scores
Source	Rating
AllMusic	3/5 stars
Cross Rhythms	6/10 stars

Wake is the third full-length studio album by Christian hard rock band Mortal. For this album, the band moved away from industrial and embraced a more alternative rock-based sound. The album reached No. 21 on the Billboard Top Contemporary Christian chart.

== Track listing ==
1. Paradigm One (5:38)
2. June First (3:44)
3. Mother's Day (4:12)
4. Vial (2:51)
5. Filter (4:11)
6. Speed of Sound (4:46)
7. Oceanful (5:35)
8. Serpent-Teen (3:28)
9. Moons and Suns (3:00)
10. Fall (0:56)
11. Sold (6:19)
12. God of 3 Strings (2:15)
13. Nowhere Man (2:42)
14. To My Darling Whippoorwill (2:06)

== Personnel ==
- Jyro Xhan
- Jerome Fontamillas
- Johann Fontamillas - vocals
- Ed Benrock - drums, percussion
- Mark - keyboards
- Hernane Mayang - vocals
- Andrew D. Prickett - guitar
- Holly S. - vocals
- Troy Yasuda - guitar
