= I Predict a Clone: A Steve Taylor Tribute =

Compilation album by Various Artists
- Released: 1994
- Genre: Contemporary Christian music
- Label: R.E.X.

Professional ratings
Review scores
Source	Rating
Syndicate	(not rated)
The Lighthouse	(not rated)

I Predict a Clone: A Steve Taylor Tribute is a various artists album released in 1994. The album is a tribute to the Christian music artist Steve Taylor.

The music is in a variety of styles which generally reflect the artist which recorded the track. Taylor himself took no part in the production of the project, and opted to donate all proceeds to Jesus People USA. He also stated that he liked the new versions better than his own, and in later concerts he began emulating the reworked styles of some songs.

== Track listing ==
No.	Title	Performed by	Length
1.	"Am I in Sync?"	Circle of Dust	5:53
2.	"A Principled Man"	Hot Pink Turtle	3:22
3.	"Sin for a Season"	Starflyer 59	3:47
4.	"Bouquet"	Sixpence None the Richer	3:08
5.	"Steeplechase / I Want to be a Clone (Instant Cake Mix)"	DigHayZoose	7:30
6.	"Harder to Believe Than Not to"	Fleming and John	4:52
7.	"Drive, He Said (D-wee Dub)"	Argyle Park	5:06
8.	"On the Fritz"	Deliverance	3:38
9.	"To Forgive"	The Wayside	5:24
10.	"We Don't Need No Colour Code"	Bride	4:09
11.	"Guilty by Association"	Sanctified Glory Mountain Revival Family	3:38
Total length:			50:23
