= Chatterbox (band) =

Music project of Jeff Bellew

- Genres: Industrial metal, Christian metal
- Years active: 1994–1999
- Label: Tooth & Nail
- Past members: Jeff Bellew; Mark Salomon; Scott Albert; Jack Bellew; Chris Reid; Garret Morgan; Pidgeon John; John Stewart

Chatterbox, also styled as CHATTERbOX, was a project of the Crucified's Jeff Bellew. The project hosted many session musicians, including Stavesacre and the Crucified's Mark Salomon, and Argyle Park and Circle of Dust's Scott Albert. Bellew has also played on Argyle Park's album Misguided, along with Salomon, Dirk Lemmenes (of Focused and Stavesacre), and multiple other musicians.

== History ==
Chatterbox began following both the Crucified's disbanding and his touring stint with Mortal, in 1994 by Jeff Bellew. Bellew created the band, inspired by Ministry, Mortal, and Circle of Dust. Jyro Xhan of Mortal helped produce Chatterbox's first demo, though Bellew would have preferred he would have been more "hands-on".

Garret Morgan joined as a guitarist, and the two co-wrote the debut album. The album, Despite, was produced by Klayton Scott, and they received offers from labels such as Blonde Vinyl Collection and Tooth & Nail Records, eventually signing with the latter, with their debut album being the seventh release on the label. The album featured performances with Mark Salomon, and others. With the album completed, Bellew and Morgan took the band on tour with Focused and Unashamed, with Focused's bassist and Bellew's longtime friend Dirk Lemmenes joining on bass live and Chris Reid, who recorded on the album, on drums. While on tour, however, Bellew learned that his mother died from cancer. Once the tour was over, Chatterbox essentially embarked on hiatus.

In 1999, the band released a first compilation album, which was a compilation of demos, with the first three being from the Mortal demo, the next five being recorded with the full band, the next two being between Reid and Bellew, and the final song being Reid only. The album, titled The Nothing Inside You, was released through Rotting Audio Sound Recordings.

== Members ==
Last known lineup

- Jeff Bellew – vocals, bass, guitar, samples (1994–1999)
- Garret Morgan – guitars, backing vocals (1994–1999)
- Chris Reid – guitar, bass, drums (1994–1999)

Live

- Dirk Lemmenes – bass (1994–1995)

Session musicians

- Mark Salomon – additional vocals, percussion
- Scott Albert – additional guitar, backing vocals
- Jack Bellew – narration
- Pidgeon John – percussion
- John Stewart – backing vocals

== Discography ==
Studio albums

- Despite (1994; Tooth & Nail)

Compilation albums

- The Nothing Inside You (1999; Rotting Audio Sound Recordings)
