= Lusis =

Studio album by Mortal
- Released: 1992
- Genre: Industrial, dance-rock, Contemporary Christian music, Christian metal
- Length: 58:31
- Label: Intense/Frontline
- Producer: Terry Scott Taylor

Mortal chronology
Lusis (1992)	Fathom (1993)

Professional ratings
Review scores
Source	Rating
Cross Rhythms	8/10 stars
AllMusic	4/5 stars
Cross Rhythms (Lusis/Fathom dual album)	8/10 stars

Lusis is the debut album by Christian industrial band Mortal. Though not the first Christian industrial music album, it helped to popularize the genre. Contemporary Christian music single "Mytho X" became a hit on the Christian metal charts, and Mortal was named the best new band 1992 in a CCM Magazine readers' poll. The album was produced by Terry Scott Taylor of Daniel Amos.

== Track listing ==
1. "Enfleshed (The Word Is Alive)" (4:39)
2. "Mytho-X" (4:26)
3. "If Ever Maria" (4:21)
4. "Fisherman" (4:39)
5. "Painkiller" (4:51)
6. "Tuesday Assassin" (5:39)
7. "Rescinding" (4:54)
8. "Cryptic" (5:38)
9. "Miracle Man" (3:53)
10. "Santa Cruz" (4:30)
11. "S.F.N." (1:00)
12. "Sinister" (5:23)
13. "Enfleshed [Alive Is the Word Remix]" (4:38)

== Personnel ==
- Jyro Xhan
- Jerome Fontamillas
