= Songs We Didn't Write =

Studio album by Ghoti Hook
- Released: 1998
- Genre: Christian punk, Christian rock
- Label: Tooth & Nail

Ghoti Hook chronology
Banana Man (1997)	Songs We Didn't Write (1998)	Two Years To Never (2000)

Professional ratings
Review scores
Source	Rating
Allmusic	link
HM Magazine	link

Songs We Didn't Write is Ghoti Hook's third CD on Tooth & Nail Records. A cover album, it contains Ghoti Hook versions of songs both from secular and Christian music.

== Track listing ==
1. I Love Rock 'n' Roll (by Joan Jett and the Blackhearts)
2. Earth Angel (originally by The Penguins)
3. True Faith (originally by New Order)
4. Just What I Needed (originally by The Cars)
5. Friends (originally by Michael W. Smith)
6. Acquiesce (originally by Stavesacre)
7. I See Red (originally by X)
8. Walking On Sunshine (originally by Katrina and the Waves)
9. The Guitar Song (originally by Dead Milkmen)
10. Hey Nonny Nonny (originally by Violent Femmes)
11. On The Road Again (originally by Willie Nelson)
12. Where Is My Mind? (originally by The Pixies)
13. Burning Love (originally by Elvis Presley)
14. The Invisible Man (originally by The Vindictives)
15. Laugh Track
