= Intense Live Series Vol. 5 =

Live album by Mortal
- Released: 1993
- Recorded: April 10, 1993
- Genre: Industrial, CCM
- Length: 27:02
- Label: Intense/Frontline
- Producer: Terry Scott Taylor/Terry Norman Taylor

Mortal chronology
Fathom (1993)	Intense Live Series Vol. 5 (1993)	Wake (1994)

Professional ratings
Review scores
Source	Rating
AllMusic	3/5 stars

Intense Records Presents: Recorded Live, Vol. 5 is a live studio EP by Christian industrial duo Mortal. The album includes covers of U2's "One Tree Hill" and Amy Grant/Michael W. Smith's "Thy Word".

== Track listing ==
1. "Lift" 3:22
2. "Tuesday Assassin" 5:33
3. "One Tree Hill" 4:05
4. "Rift" 4:21
5. "Thy Word" (homage to Amy and Michael) 3:59
6. "Cryptic" 5:42

== Personnel ==
- Jyro Xhan
- Jerome Fontamillas - keyboards, sampling, background vocals
- Allen Aguirre - vocals
- Jeff Bellew - guitar, background vocals
- Jim Chaffin - drums, background vocals
- Bryan Gray - bass guitar, background vocals
- Eric Hannah - background vocals
- Jake Landrau - guitar
- Michael Stone - background vocals
- Justin Winokur - guitar, background vocals
