= The Way We Are (Fleming and John album) =

Studio album by Fleming and John
- Released: 1999
- Genre: Rock
- Label: Universal Records

The Way We Are is an album by Fleming and John, released on February 23, 1999 by Universal Records.

== Reception ==
Daniel J. Katz reviewed the album for the student newspaper The Tech and opined: "The first thing to get used to is Fleming's screeching soprano voice", which he compared to "Bjork covering Veruca Salt in a charming way". Katz called The Way We Are "eclectic without being burdensome and entertaining without being shallow", and considered "The Pearl", "Sadder Day", and "Comfortable" to be standout tracks. AllMusic's Erik Crawford commended Fleming and John's unique musical stylings and acknowledged the duo's "intimacy and control" in the album that they wrote, produced and recorded on their own. The Knoxville News Sentinel's Chuck Campbell rated the album four out of five stars, writing that the constant tonal shifts and humor resulted in an album that is "weird, but oddly rewarding." Dayton Daily News's Ron Rollins gave the album a "B-" rating, writing that the musical arrangements worked well on tracks like "Sssh!" and "The Way We Are", but were "grating and wild" on others like "The Pearl". In a positive review of the album, The Morning Call's Larry Printz praised "Sssh!" as one of the best rock songs he had come across in a long time, and noted that Fleming was able to make full use of her "limited" vocals on the tracks.

== Track listing ==
1. "Twinkle" – 0:24
2. "I'm So Small" – 3:00
3. "Sssh!" – 3:32
4. "The Pearl" – 4:29
5. "Comfortable" – 4:03
6. "Don't Let it Fade Away" – 4:52
7. "The Way We Are" – 4:42
8. "Radiate" – 2:19
9. "Ugly Girl" – 3:48
10. "Sadder Day" – 4:59
11. "Rain All Day" – 5:37
12. "Devil's Food" – 3:49
13. "Suppressed Emotions" – 4:48
14. "I Fall for You" – 3:14
15. "That's All I Know" – 2:26
16. "The Hidden Track" – 4:26

== Personnel ==
- Fleming McWilliams — vocals, flute, harmonium, arrangements
- John Mark Painter — guitars, bass guitar, percussion, vocals, vibraphone, piano, accordion, double bass, cello, clavinet, theremin, timpani, balalaika, oud, baglama, harmonium, omnichord, tabla, flugelhorn, trombone, lap steel guitar, xylophone, dilruba, bodhrán, dulcimer, udu, arrangements, mixing
- Shawn McWilliams — drums
- David Davidson — violin
- Jill McWilliams — backing vocals
- Ben Folds — backing vocals
