= MagentaMantaLoveTree =

Studio album by Dighayzoose
- Released: 1993
- Genre: Modern rock
- Length: 64:51
- Labels: Brainstorm Artists, Intl, Word Records
- Producers: Gene Eugene; Dighayzoose

Dighayzoose chronology
StruggleFish (1991)	MagentaMantaLoveTree (1993)	Ascension 7: Rocketship to Heaven (1995)

Professional ratings
Review scores
Source	Rating
Cross Rhythms	(not rated) link
CCM Magazine	(not rated)
True Tunes News	(not rated)
Cornerstone	(not rated)

MagentaMantaLoveTree (1993) was the second album released by Dighayzoose with a duration of nearly 65 minutes. All band members, except of Jimmi Rodrigez, participated in the writing process. The album was a departure from their debut which had been, according to multiple critics, essentially a Red Hot Chili Peppers clone. According to True Tunes News the band used the language of psychedelia to create "bizarre and visual lyrics." Their lyrics touched sometimes personal topics such as love & beauty in a dream about a future wife ("MagentaMantaLoveTree"), hate ("H8 Machine"), and self-loathing ("Diggin' Away"). Musically the album contained a great number of styles mashed together into a George Clinton style "cosmic slop." One review drew musical parallels to Steve Vai, Primus, Faith No More, Jane's Addiction, and Scaterd Few.

Many of the tracks are prepended by short samples.

== Track listing ==
1. "Beginning" – 0:16
2. "Dancing In Concert With The Infinite" – 4:42
3. "Whoompfinashun #7" – 0:11
4. "Slatherage" – 7:31
5. "Brave Strong Song" – 0:08
6. "Lift" – 4:58
7. "MagentaMantaLoveTree" – 8:34
8. "No One Told You?" – 0:10
9. "Secret" – 4:40
10. "Detention – 3:00 a.m." – 0:25
11. "Penalty Box" – 0:32
12. "Circle Of Pain" – 4:41
13. "Doubt" – 5:55
14. "Diggin' Away" – 3:05
15. "Vanillanator" – 0:09
16. "H8 Machine" – 3:27
17. "Untitled" – 0:20
18. "Black-Eyed Pea" – 5:45
19. "99¢ Smile" – 0:18
20. "B.D.O.C." – 2:34
21. "Regret" – 5:41
22. "Twenty-second Track" – 0:49
