= Trytan =

- Origin: Chicago, Illinois
- Genres: Progressive metal, glam metal, hard rock
- Years active: 1979 - 1991
- Label: R.E.X. Records

Trytan is a Christian progressive / glam metal / hard rock band from Chicago, Illinois, musically similar to Rush. The band was ministry oriented, and had what Christian music critic John J. Thompson characterized as a significant impact on their scene.

== Background ==
Their second demo (1987) was reworked for release by R.E.X. Records under the name Celestial Messenger. It featured a metal sound typical of the hair era of metal. Their debut's lyrics also reflect their ministry orientation, one stated that the band wrote about "getting closer to God and not rejecting the Truth." The album became a classic for fans of Christian metal and was subject to an illegal re-release in 1998. The legal 2000 re-release of Celestial Messenger features a bonus of three remastered tracks as well as material from an early demo a bonus.

Their second album, Sylentiger, was released in 1990. It featured a harder sound and lyrics which the Encyclopedia of Contemporary Christian Music characterised as presenting a need for salvation with a viewpoint from arminian theology. In retrospect HM magazine editor Doug Van Pelt found the record to be disappointing compared to their debut.

Trytan disbanded in the early 1990s. Lary Dean started a ministry in 1991 which had evolved into the Heart Maneuvers Christian Fellowship church by 1993. Scott Blackman, drummer on Celestial Messenger, eventually became an associate pastor there. Lary Dean continued to work in the Chicago music scene.

As of July 2020, Trytan has reformed, and is currently finishing up work on a new album entitled "Blood Of Kings"

== Discography ==
- 1986: demo
- 1987: demo (North Star)
- 1987: Celestial Messenger (R.E.X., Reviews: Cross Rhythms, HM Magazine, The Phantom Tollbooth)
- 1990: Sylentiger
- 2001: Live At Cornerstone 2001

== Members ==
- Lary Dean - guitar, vocals, keyboard
- Steve Robinson - bass, keyboard (replaced Adame)
- Scott Blackman - drums (-1990)
- Jim Dobbs - drums (1990)
- Jon Adame - bass, vocals, keyboard (on 1986 demo)
- Jerome Mikulich - recording engineer & producer
