= Fleming and John =

American musical duo

- Origin: Nashville, Tennessee, US
- Genres: Rock
- Years active: 1994–present
- Labels: R.E.X., Universal
- Members: Fleming McWilliams; John Mark Painter
- Past members: Shawn McWilliams; Stan Rawls

Fleming and John is a musical husband and wife team, Fleming McWilliams and John Mark Painter, currently living in Nashville, Tennessee, United States.

The couple met while attending Belmont University in Nashville, and immediately began collaborating on songs. While pursuing a record contract, Painter began playing in studio sessions for artists like dc Talk, Sixpence None the Richer, Indigo Girls, Jars of Clay, Nanci Griffith, and Jewel.

In 1994, the band recorded "Harder to Believe than Not To" for I Predict A Clone, a tribute album to Steve Taylor. The following year, the couple released their first album, Delusions of Grandeur on Universal Records. Ben Folds, who called Fleming and John "the Carpenters of the 1990s with Led Zeppelin's rhythm section", invited them to open for his band. They continued to perform and record with Folds for many years, with both being featured on Folds' experimental album, Fear of Pop: Volume 1.

In 1999, Fleming and John released their second album, The Way We Are, which spawned a minor hit with the single "Ugly Girl".

The duo has recorded many cover songs, including "Winter Wonderland" (to the tune of Led Zeppelin's "Misty Mountain Hop"), "Eldorado" (Electric Light Orchestra), "California Dreamin'" (The Mamas & the Papas), "Somebody to Love" (Jefferson Airplane), "After the Lovin'" (Engelbert Humperdinck). A longtime concert favorite has been Sonny & Cher's "I Got You Babe" to the tune of Zeppelin's "Black Dog".

The band has been dormant since the tour for The Way We Are finished in the late 1990s. In 2015 they successfully funded a Kickstarter campaign to record a new album. Initially intended as a 2015 release, the album has still not been released as of 2026.

John and Fleming continue to run IHOF (International House of Fleming) studios and the DWEEB recording label, blogging about their latest projects.

== Discography ==
- Delusions of Grandeur, 1995 debut album - R.E.X. Music
- Delusions of Grandeur, 1996 debut album - remixed and released by Universal Records
- The Way We Are, 1999 album - Universal Records
- Ugly Girl / The Pearl, 1998 CD single - Universal Records

Compilations

- I Predict a Clone, 1994 - Song: "Harder to Believe Than Not To"
- Volume 1, Fear of Pop (Ben Folds, William Shatner, etc.), 1998
- Vietnam: A Musical Retrospective, 1998 - Song: "California Dreamin'"
- Music for Corporations Vol 1, Headmint, 2000
- Traveling Light - Songs from the 23rd Psalm, 2002 - Song: "Savior Like a Shepherd Lead Us"
- Lynne Me Your Ears, Jeff Lynne tribute album, 2002 - Song: "Eldorado"
- Position Music - Artist Compilation Vol. 17 - Female Artists, 2017 - Song: "Next to You"
- There's A Rainbow Somewhere (The Songs Of Randy Stonehill), various artists, 2022 - Song: "Puppet Strings"

Film soundtracks

- Hoodwinked!, 2005
