= Sumo Surprise =

Studio album by Ghoti Hook
- Released: August 30, 1996
- Genre: Pop punk, Christian punk
- Length: 45:02
- Label: Tooth & Nail

Ghoti Hook chronology
Boca Grande (1995)	Sumo Surprise (1996)	Banana Man (1997)

Professional ratings
Review scores
Source	Rating
Allmusic	4/5 stars

Sumo Surprise is the debut studio album by the American punk band Ghoti Hook, released on Tooth and Nail Records. The album is a pop punk CD, with a tendency toward both humor and evangelical Christianity.

== Track listing ==
1. Body Juggler 3:00
2. Seasons 2:56
3. South Capitol Street 3:27
4. Ooklah The Punk 2:46
5. Tract Boy 3:27
6. Scared Am I 3:37
7. Samson 3:13
8. Spice Drops 2:54
9. Shrinky Dinks 3:49
10. Money 3:26
11. Super Sumo 3:01
12. Knock Knock 3:06
13. Dry Run 2:43
14. Never 3:37
