= Fear of Pop: Volume 1 =

Studio album by Fear of Pop
- Released: November 17, 1998
- Genre: Alternative rock
- Length: 41:37
- Label: 550
- Producer: Ben Folds, John Mark Painter, Caleb Southern

Professional ratings
Review scores
Source	Rating
Allmusic	3/5 stars
Rolling Stone	3/5 stars

Volume 1 is the name of the first album by the experimental band Fear of Pop. The album was a project of Ben Folds, John Mark Painter, Fleming McWilliams, and others. It was released on November 17, 1998 on 550 Records (with distribution from Sony Records).

At some stores, a limited edition 12" vinyl single for "In Love" was bundled for free with Volume 1. It featured a remix of the song by Thievery Corporation, as well as a couple of cuts off of the album.

Although Folds, Painter and Caleb Southern were the primary contributors to the album, a large cast of other musicians were included as well. William Shatner provided vocals on "In Love" (as well as the reprise, "Still in Love"). Painter's wife, Fleming McWilliams, sang on several tracks. Frally Hynes, Folds' Australian then-girlfriend (and wife from 1999 to 2007) performed frantic lead vocals on "Root to This" ("root" being a crude Australian slang term for sexual intercourse). Folds sang on a number of songs as well.

The track "Rubber Sled" is a humorous reference to Ben Folds Five bass player Robert Sledge. A clip of Brick by Ben Folds Five is playing in the background at the beginning of this song, though played at twice its normal speed, and a sample of Folds yelling "Robert Sledge on the bass guitar!" can be heard approximately halfway through the song. "I Paid My Money" was at least almost a decade old at the time it was recorded in 1998. The original 1990 demo version featured Folds singing over an African-American choir.

== Cover ==
The album cover displays the silhouettes of a running man and two lasso-throwing cowboys in pursuit on horseback. The back of the album case shows the silhouette of a boy in a cowboy outfit sitting on a park bench with what appears to be an erect penis in his hands. The inner cover depicts a woman being violently attacked on a television seen in a city apartment. All the images are from David Bethell's "Just Your Average Second on This Planet" 1997-1998.

== Track listing ==
No.	Title	Writer(s)	Length
1.	"Fear of Pop"	Folds, Southern	3:26
2.	"Kops" (featuring Jay Goin, Scott Edwards and Ben Goldman as "The Kops")	Folds	6:07
3.	"Slow Jam '98"	Folds	4:50
4.	"Blink"	Folds	1:23
5.	"In Love" (featuring William Shatner as "The Unrequited Lover" and David Davidson on violin)	Folds	4:46
6.	"Interlude"	Folds	0:21
7.	"Avery M. Powers Memorial Beltway"	Folds	5:58
8.	"I Paid My Money"	Folds	3:16
9.	"Rubber Sled" (featuring Mike Flynn as "The Customer")	Folds	4:55
10.	"Root to This" (featuring Frally Hynes as "The Shouting Woman")	Folds	5:09
11.	"Still in Love" (featuring William Shatner)	Folds	1:26

== Personnel ==
- Ben Folds - piano, vocals, organ, chamberlin, synthesizer, clavinet, guitar, bass guitar, drums, vocoder, talkbox
- David Davidson - violin
- Mike Flynn - organ
- Fleming McWilliams - vocals
- John Mark Painter - acoustic guitar, guitar, trombone, trumpet, cello, theremin, djembe, chamberlin, vocoder
- William Shatner - vocals
- Frally Hynes - vocals

== Production ==
- Producers: Ben Folds, John Mark Painter, Caleb Southern
- Engineers: Ben Folds, Caleb Southern
- Mixing: John Mark Painter, Caleb Southern
- Mastering: Howie Weinberg
- Art direction: Josh Cheuse
- Packaging Art: David Bethell
