= Speakeasy (Stavesacre album) =

Studio album by Stavesacre
- Released: November 16, 1999
- Recorded: 1999
- Genres: Rock, Christian rock
- Length: 54:37
- Label: Tooth & Nail
- Producers: Bryan Carlstrom, Stavesacre

Stavesacre chronology
Absolutes (1997)	Speakeasy (1999)	Split/EP (2001)

Professional ratings
Review scores
Source	Rating
AllMusic	3/5 stars
HM	not rated
The Phantom Tollbooth	4.5/5 stars 3.5/5 stars

Speakeasy is the third full-length album by Christian rock band Stavesacre. It was the band's final studio album to be released on Tooth & Nail Records. The band would later re-record "Keep Waiting", "Gold and Silver" and "Rivers Underneath" for the Collective compilation album, also released through Tooth & Nail.

== Track listing ==
1. "Minuteman" – 3:17
2. "Sundown Motel" – 5:11
3. "Keep Waiting" – 4:31
4. "You Know How It Is" – 2:15
5. "Rivers Underneath" – 6:12
6. "Gold and Silver" – 5:11
7. "Freefall (From Hand to Hand)" – 6:39
8. "St. Eriksplan" [Part I] – 2:45
9. "St. Eriksplan" [Part II] – 3:40
10. "Disquiet" – 3:38
11. "Fascination Street" – 4:05 (The Cure cover)
12. "This Love" – 6:31

== Personnel ==
- Mark Salomon – vocals
- Ryan Dennee – guitars
- Dirk Lemmenes – bass
- Sam West – drums
- Jeff Bellew – additional guitars

== Charts ==
- No. 35 (Top Contemporary Christian) – 1999
