= The Throes (band) =

American indie band

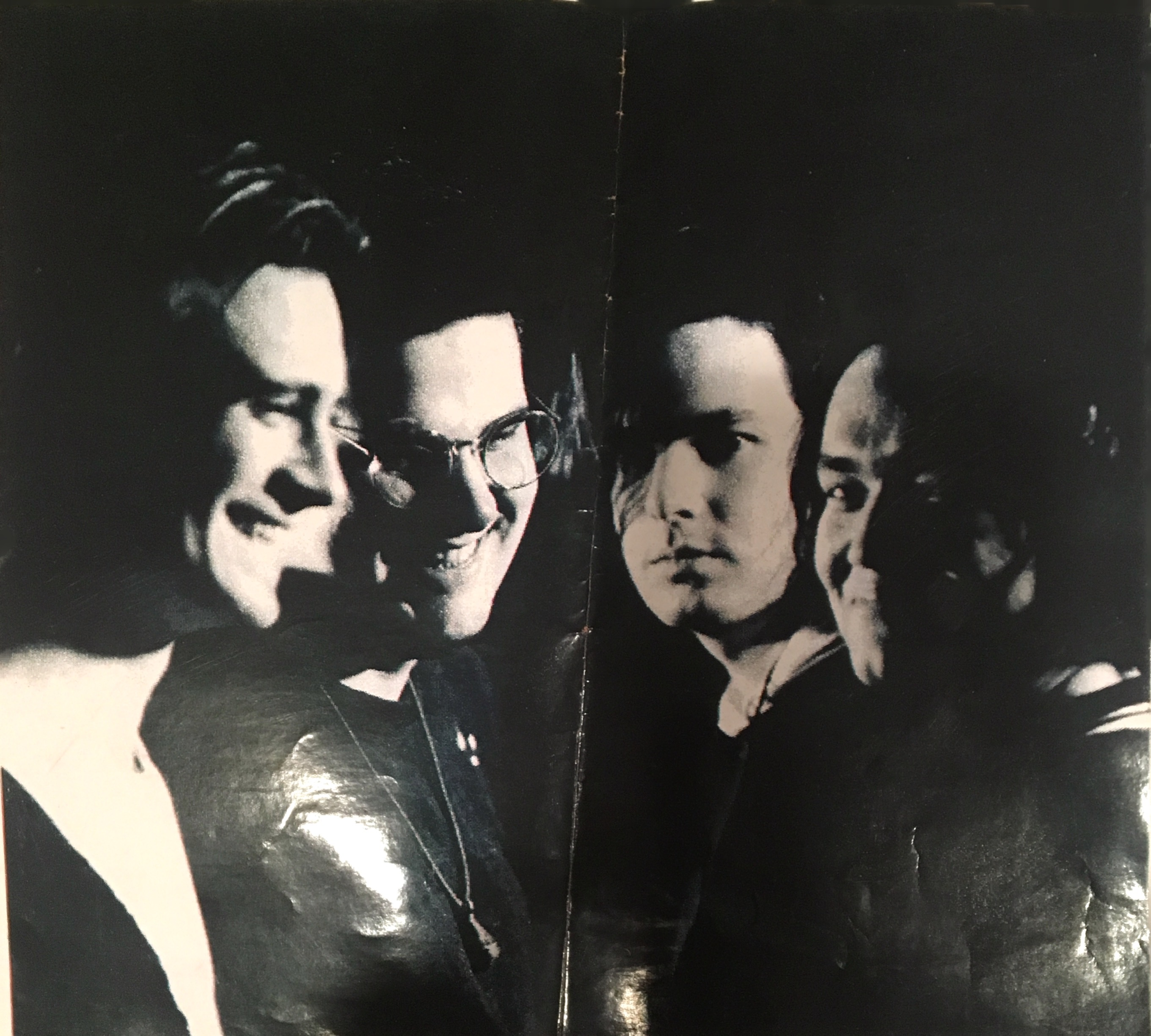
- The Throes - 1991: Bill Campbell, David Lash, Harry Evans, and Harv Evans

Background information
- Origin: Washington, D.C., and Northern Virginia, U.S.
- Genres: Indie Band
- Years active: 1988–present
- Labels: R.E.X.; Glasshouse; Rode Dog/BMG; Brainstorm Artists International
- Members: Bill Campbell; Harry Evans; Jeff Booth; Dean Nitz; Harv Evans
- Past members: Joy Gewalt; David Lash; David Cooper

The Throes is an indie band formed in 1988 in Northern Virginia.

== Background ==
The original lineup consisted of singer and guitarist Bill Campbell, percussionist Harry Evans and bassist Joy Gewalt. Friends from the suburbs of Greater Washington, D.C., the Throes released an independent cassette in 1989, The Era of Condolence, featuring seven songs written by Campbell and Evans of "youth, love and unanswered questions."

In 1990, they were the first alternative pop band to sign with R.E.X. Records, an indie label based out of New York City and known mostly for its speed and death metal acts. In September 1990, they released All The Flowers Growing In Your Mother's Eyes. Reviewer J. Edward Keyes wrote, Flowers "creates moody, dour pop akin to R.E.M. and The Smiths" with "sparkling guitar" driven by "idiosyncratic percussion." On the whole, Keyes says, the album is "charged with the unmistakable energy of possibility, the sound of a young band who still believes they can change the world."

Three albums followed: Fall on Your World (1992); 12 Before 9 (1995), featuring the only remaining founding member, Bill Campbell, presiding over its creation; and Ameroafriasiana (1997), ushering the return of Harry Evans.

The Throes fifth album, Evila, is a live album that includes versions of 10 songs, including Say Hello, All the Flowers Growing in Your Mother's Eyes, and Just One Moment.

In 2020, All The Flowers Growing in Your Mother's Eyes and The Era of Condolence were remastered and released on vinyl, CD, and digital through Lo-Fidelity Records.

The band continues to perform sporadic live shows in Northern Virginia, generally as an opening act for other artists, including the 77s, the Choir and Ghoti Hook.

== Discography ==
=== Studio albums ===
- All the Flowers Growing in Your Mother’s Eyes (1990) – R.E.X
- Fall on Your World (1992) – Glasshouse
- 12 Before 9 (1995) – Rode Dog/BMG
- Ameroafriasiana (1997) – Brainstorm Artists

=== Compilations ===
- Argh!!! (The Official R.E.X. Sampler), 1991
- When Worlds Collide: A Tribute to Daniel Amos, 2000
