= Banana Man (album) =

Studio album by Ghoti Hook
- Released: November 4, 1997
- Genre: Pop punk, Christian punk
- Label: Tooth & Nail

Ghoti Hook chronology
Sumo Surprise (1996)	Banana Man (1997)	Songs We Didn't Write (1998)

Professional ratings
Review scores
Source	Rating
Allmusic	link

Banana Man is Ghoti Hook's second CD on Tooth and Nail Records. It continues the band's trademark sound started with Sumo Surprise, combining Christianity with humor and fast melodic punk.

== Track listing ==
1. Banana Man
2. Estevan
3. My Bike
4. The Box
5. Middle Ground
6. Running Away
7. The Box
8. Just Fools
9. Cowboy
10. Untitled Track
11. Love by the Numbers
12. At the Zoo
13. The Box
14. Monsters
15. Gimme a Chance
16. The Box

"The Box" is the name for four separate tracks, all the same song played at different speeds. The untitled track is three seconds long, and consists of someone yelling in Spanish, "Yo quiero mandar besos y brasos a la toda la Bolivia!" In English, this is "I want to give kisses and hugs to all of Bolivia!"
