= Fear of Pop =

- Origin: United States
- Genres: Indie rock, experimental
- Years active: 1997–1999
- Labels: 550/Sony
- Members: Ben Folds; Caleb Southern; John Mark Painter; Fleming McWilliams; William Shatner; Frally Hynes

Fear of Pop is an experimental recording project by Ben Folds (of Ben Folds Five) and Caleb Southern (Ben Folds Five's long-time producer), along with John Mark Painter (of Fleming and John), William Shatner and others. Their only album, Volume 1, was released in 1998.

== Biography ==
Folds and Southern began recording music for the "Fear of Pop" project during 1997 in various locations around the United States as an outlet to make music away from Ben Folds Five. In an open letter to fans on Frank Maynard's quasi-official Ben Folds Five website, Folds said that Fear of Pop had "helped satisfy my need to express some things musically - textures, orchestration, rhythms - things that don't always naturally fall into the standard three-minute singer/song format. I love to paint sounds in an abstract way, discovering their effect after it's all put together. Once you’ve sold a million records, you've earned the right to experiment self-indulgently at the expense of your record company."

In 1998, 550 Records (under Epic/Sony) released Folds' Volume 1. The cover of the album, an image entitled "Just Your Average Second On This Planet" by David Bethell, featured the silhouette of a running man being pursued by cowboys on horseback with lassos. The back of the album case showed the silhouette of a boy in a cowboy outfit sitting on a park bench. The inner cover showed a woman being stabbed by a man on a television set seen by an open city window. At some stores, a limited edition 12" vinyl single for "In Love" was bundled for free with Volume 1. It featured a remix of the song by Thievery Corporation, as well as a couple of cuts from the album.

The band also included a cast of musicians other than Folds, Southern and Painter. William Shatner provided vocals on "In Love" (as well as the reprise, "Still in Love"). Painter's wife, Fleming McWilliams, also sang on several tracks. Frally Hynes, Folds' then-girlfriend (and now ex-wife), performed frantic lead vocals on "Root to This."

On January 22, 1999 Fear of Pop gave their first and only live performance on Late Night with Conan O'Brien. They performed "In Love", with William Shatner on lead vocals, along with Folds and McWilliams quietly duetting underneath the actor's monologue. Eddie Walker, the drummer for Folds' first band, Majosha, played drums during this appearance.

== Discography ==
=== Studio albums ===
- Fear of Pop: Volume 1 (1998)
