= Ascension 7: Rocketship to Heaven =

Live album by Dighayzoose
- Released: 1995
- Recorded: Cornerstone Festival, 1994
- Genre: Rock music
- Length: 59:15
- Label: Brainstorm Artists International
- Producer: Dighyzoose with N.C.I

Dighayzoose chronology
MagentaMantaLoveTree (1993)	Ascension 7: Rocketship to Heaven (1995)

Ascension 7: Rocketship to Heaven is a live album by Dighayzoose. It captures their performance at Cornerstone 1994 show as presented.

== Track listing ==
1. "Intro / Dancing In Concert With The Infinite" – 5:07
2. "Strugglefish" – 5:00
3. "Slow Serious" – 4:35
4. "Whoo Woo" – 0:14
5. "Slatherage" – 7:53
6. "Magentamantalovetree" – 14:17
7. "Self" – 1:25
8. "Beware Of Strangers Bearing Gifts" – 0:27
9. "Later (L.A. 1994)" – 3:52
10. "Circle Of Pain" – 4:37
11. "Secret" – 4:30
12. "Intro To Regret" – 1:34
13. "Regret" – 5:38

== Credits ==
- Phil - vocals, toy megaphone
- Dave Anderson - Guitar, vocals
- Jim Florez - Drums, vocals
- Bil Brown - Bass vocals
- Zoop - guitars

Guests:

- Dan Michaels - sax, vocals on "woo"
- Allan Aguirre - vocals and gifts

Production:

- Recorded & Engineered: Buckeye the cat
- Mixed by Bill Crain, BRC Audio Productions, Kansas City, MO
- Edited & Mastered: Buddy Miller, Nashville, TN
- Art: Bil Brown
- Layout and design: Bil Brown and Brad Springer

"Self" and "Later" are by Scaterd Few.
