= Circle of Dust (album) =

Studio album by Circle of Dust
- Released: July 1992; January 24, 1995 (re-recorded); March 4, 2016 (remaster)
- Recorded: 1991; 1994 (re-recorded)
- Genre: Industrial rock, industrial metal, electronic rock
- Length: 51:25
- Label: REX; FiXT Music (remaster)
- Producer: Scott Albert

Circle of Dust chronology
Circle of Dust (1992)	Brainchild (1994)

Re-recording chronology
Brainchild (1994)	Circle of Dust (re-recording) (1995)	Disengage (1998)

Remaster chronology
Disengage (1998)	Circle of Dust (Remastered) (2016)	Brainchild (Remastered) (2016)

Circle of Dust is the title of two versions of a studio album American industrial rock band Circle of Dust. The first version was the band's debut, released through R.E.X. Records in 1992. In 1994, Circle of Dust completely re-recorded the album and replaced some songs with new, different tracks. This version, released in 1995 through R.E.X., achieved the 25th slot on CMJ's Hard Rock 75 listings that same year.

== History ==
All songs were written by Klayton, then known by his birth name "Scott Albert". The album was initially released through R.E.X. Records to the limited Christian music market. After R.E.X. secured mainstream distribution through Relativity Records, it was decided that a new Circle of Dust record should be put out quickly to take advantage of the increased distribution and get the band's name out there. Klayton, however, opted not to take an extended period of time to write and record a brand new album but instead re-recorded his debut album, scrapping several songs and introducing a handful of new ones. This decision was partly fueled by Klayton's intense distaste for the Circle of Dust debut:

That original release was an abomination as far as I'm concerned. I hated the release when I walked out the door of the studio I had just recorded it in, in 1991. (I still have hopes that every copy that still exists will somehow dematerialize permanently.)

— Klayton, HM Magazine

"Exploration", "Technological Disguise" and "Senseless Abandon" were scrapped from the re-recorded version of the album. Klayton later stated in an episode of Ask Circle of Dust that he didn't like either of the latter two and had no place on the remastered album. However, a new version of "Exploration" appeared on the 2016 remaster of the 1995 album, and remasters of the other two songs would later be added in the 2019 compilation, Circle of Dust: Demos & Rarities.

== Reception ==
Professional ratings
Review scores
Source	Rating
AllMusic	(1995 version)
Sputnikmusic	(2016 remaster)

Bradley Torreano of AllMusic called Circle of Dust "a bizarre case that eventually led to a satisfying end." He said that while the 1992 debut was "a somewhat dull and flat collection of post-Pretty Hate Machine industrial pop... the newer album is leaner, tougher, and packed with disorienting samples and chugging guitars. This is a wonderful change from the original..." He rated the 1995 version four out of five, concluding that while the Trent Reznor influence was still strong, the band managed to carve out a unique place in the underground industrial scene and that "their Slayer-esque riffing, scattered blips and samples, and memorable melodies make for the first truly great album in the small Christian industrial genre."

Trey from Sputnikmusic rated the 2016 remaster 4.0 out of 5. In his review of the remaster, he wrote that "with the proper label backing, Circle of Dust would have been bigger than Ministry; their album was certainly better." The recording "took the electronics and industrial-pop of Nine Inch Nails’ I, and combined it with a thrash-based industrial metal sound that just worked." But, because of the obscurity of the record label releasing it, "instead of being a huge genre-defining album, Circle of Dust’s initial 1992 release just kind of came-and-went." Trey said the 1995 album "definitely did better... ...but it still didn’t reach the heights of Ministry or Nine Inch Nails." He then said that the 2016 remaster is the best version yet. The percussion is more intense, the electronics that on the 1995 release tended to get buried cut right through the riffs to complement the music and add melody, the riffs are sharper and not muddy, and "Klayton’s vocals are now able to glide over the top when he’s featuring his melodic side and drop into the music when things get heavier." Trey summarized that "Even today, Circle of Dust’s debut is one of the most perfect blends of metal and electronics. The problem has always been the album’s dated production. The remastered version has totally fixed that issue and has finally presented the album the way Klayton probably imagined it all those years ago."

Jonathan Swank from Heaven's Metal Magazine also reviewed the 2016 remaster. He said that while the 1992 recording was a "landmark" release, Klayton had disliked that album and re-made it for release in 1995. Swank described the remaster as somewhat a "hybrid" of the two versions. He described the remaster as "obliterating". He praised how the low-end frequency was given a boost and thus improves the percussion quality as well as adding crunch to the guitar. He also praised the more dynamic quality of the sound and how everything, including the vocals and spoken word, comes through with more clarity. He noted that "The improvements in dynamic contrast and frequency range, in addition to making the music really come to life, render these songs more “listenable” at higher volumes and for longer periods, in my opinion … something that was a bit of an issue with the older versions and industrial metal in general."

== Track listing ==
=== 1992 version ===
All tracks are written by Scott Albert.

No.	Title	Length
1.	"Exploration"	3:50
2.	"Dissolved"	4:36
3.	"Night Fall"	5:59
4.	"Nothing Sacred"	6:15
5.	"Twisted Reality"	5:44
6.	"Technological Disguise"	5:05
7.	"Consequence"	4:39
8.	"Demoralize"	4:03
9.	"Rational Lies"	4:38
10.	"Senseless Abandon"	6:41
Total length:		51:25

=== 1995 version ===
All tracks are written by Scott Albert.

No.	Title	Length
1.	"Onenemy"	4:49
2.	"Demoralize"	4:09
3.	"Self Inflict"	5:26
4.	"Rational Lies"	4:36
5.	"Nightfall"	5:53
6.	"Twisted Reality"	5:05
7.	"Consequence"	4:39
8.	"Dissolved"	5:21
9.	"Nothing Sacred"	6:09
10.	"Parasite/Bed of Nails"	7:33
Total length:		53:40

2016 remastered re-release: disc 1
No.	Title	Length
1.	"Exploration (Redux)"	3:50
2.	"Onenemy"	4:50
3.	"Demoralize"	4:09
4.	"Self Inflict"	5:27
5.	"Rational Lies"	4:36
6.	"Nightfall"	5:49
7.	"Twisted Reality"	5:09
8.	"Consequence"	4:39
9.	"Dissolved"	5:22
10.	"Nothing Sacred"	6:09
11.	"Parasite"	3:40
12.	"Bed of Nails"	3:34
Total length:		57:14

2016 remastered re-release: disc 2
No.	Title	Length
1.	"Neophyte"	6:00
2.	"Nothing Sacred" (Blue Stahli Remix)	4:11
3.	"Onenemy" (Acoustic)	3:18
4.	"Exploration (1992)"	3:48
5.	"Demoralize" (Cassette Demo 1990)	3:50
6.	"Dust 01" (Cassette Demo 1989)	4:41
7.	"Dust 02" (Cassette Demo 1988)	0:45
8.	"Dust 03" (Cassette Demo 1988)	0:49
9.	"Dust 04"	5:19
10.	"Dust 05"	2:41
11.	"Dust 06"	4:38
12.	"Dust 07"	2:58
13.	"Dust 08"	3:21
14.	"Dust 09"	0:53
15.	"Nothing Sacred" (Blue Stahli Remix; instrumental)	4:11
16.	"Onenemy" (Acoustic instrumental)	3:20
Total length:		54:50
