= Fold Zandura =

American alternative rock band

- Origin: California
- Genres: Alternative rock
- Years active: 1995–present
- Labels: Xhan; Sub•Lime Records; Velvet Blue Music; BEC Recordings
- Members: Jyro Xhan (vocals, guitar, programming); Jerome Fontamillas (bass, programming, vocals); Frank Lenz (drums, vocals).
- Past members: Kevin Pollard (Tour Only); Joey Marchiano (drums) (Tour Only); Joey Anderson (guitar) (Tour Only); David Chang (guitar live shows)
- Website: www.foldzandura.com

Fold Zandura is an alternative rock band from California. They released four albums between 1995 and 1999, plus one white 7" vinyl. Each album was released under a different label. The two premier members also founded the industrial band Mortal. Their songs are "love songs and praise songs" according to Jyro. Though they are presently involved in other projects, Fold Zandura's website maintains that "the band's not officially dead".

== The band ==
- Jyro Xhan (vocals, guitar, programming)
- Jerome Fontamillas (bass, programming, vocals)
- Frank Lenz (drums, vocals)

== History ==
Fold Zandura was formed in December 1995 after the breakup of Jyro and Jerome's previous band, Mortal. They hired drummer Frank Lenz and self-released their eponymous debut. In 1997, they released two albums, the first titled Return and featuring five re-recorded songs from their debut, plus two new songs and an instrumental. They made a video for "Ember" that was filmed in a hospital. Later that year, they released their major label debut, Ultraforever, on BEC Recordings. This time, their new album contained 14 new songs and two songs from Fold Zandura. They made a music video for "Deep Surround" and also recorded two non-album tracks for two BEC compilations. Moms Like Us Too Vol. 1 featured "Serena," and Happy Christmas featured "Asia Minor". Soon thereafter, Frank Lenz left the band in order to be closer to his family, although he would continue to play at concerts close to home.

In 1999, they independently released a seven-song EP called King Planet. The band members were listed simply as Jyro and Jerome, although Jyro's wife Carla does vocals on one track. The album was available exclusively through their website and a few Christian music stores.

In 2000, Jerome Fontamillas joined Switchfoot as a session musician. He later joined them full-time. The following year, "King Planet" was featured on the soundtrack to the film Extreme Days. In early 2002, Jyro released Juggernautz, a side project without Jerome on Metro One Music. Jyro Xhan lead the band, LCNA (Lucena), under the pseudonym initials, JFM, until December, 2009, according to the band's expired MySpace page. He also works with Crystal Lewis and various other bands as producer, engineer, guitar, and keyboard player.

In July 2022, Jyro and Jerome announced the formation of a new group, MorZan (combination of their former band names) and began releasing information via their Facebook and Instagram pages as @MorzanMuzik and the band website, MorzanMuzik.com

== Discography ==
- Fold Zandura (1995) Xhan Records
- Return (1997) Sub•Lime Records
- The White 7" (1997) Velvet Blue Music
- Ultraforever (1997) BEC Recordings
- King Planet (1999) Nowhere Music, Review: HM Magazine
