= Mark Salomon =

American singer (born 1970)

- Also known as: Mark Cooksey, Rainbow
- Born: 1970 (age 55–56)
- Origin: Reno, Nevada, U.S.
- Genres: Christian metal, hard rock, Christian rock, crossover thrash, hardcore punk, speed metal
- Occupation: Singer
- Years active: 1986–present

Mark Salomon (born 1970) is an American singer best known as the lead singer of the hard rock bands Stavesacre and the Crucified. Other bands in which he has been a key member include the punk rock Outer Circle and rap-oriented Native Son and Neon Horse. In both Stavesacre and the Crucified, he served as primary lyricist as well.

== Biography ==
Mark Salomon was born in 1970 in Reno, Nevada. However, around 1972, Salomon's mother moved to California, away from his father. Growing up around Fresno, California, he was exposed to hard rock and hardcore punk bands such as U2, Suicidal Tendencies, Minor Threat, and G.B.H. In 1984, Salomon discovered a local hardcore punk band known as K.G.B., by way of a friend attending a local youth group. However, in 1985, the band's singer, Wayne Stonecipher, departed from the band, which left the remaining members to search for a vocalist. Salomon tried out and got the position, after a brief time. Following his induction, the band decided to change their name, as they felt K.G.B., which stood for Kids in God's Blessings, was juvenile. The band briefly changed their name to Directed Youth, before finalizing into the Crucified, which the drummer, Jim Chaffin, came up with.

With the name change, the lineup consisted of Salomon, Chaffin, guitarist Greg Minier, and bassist Kirk Palmer. However, Kirk departed from the band, being replaced by his brother Trevor Palmer. The lineup recorded a demo titled Take Up Your Cross, which consisted of 15 songs. Nailed, the band's second demo, was recorded the following year and the band's exposure continued to grow. Shortly after Nailed was recorded, the band members graduated from high school and Palmer left the group and was replaced by Mark Johnson. The band recorded Live at the New Order in March 1989. Now with the band consisting of Salomon, Chaffin, Minier, and Johnson, the Crucified signed with Narrowpath Records and recorded and released their debut self-titled album. Johnson left the band after the album was recorded. The band would respond to an ad in a newspaper posted by Jeff Bellew, citing the Crucified as an influence, alongside Slayer and Metallica. Bellew joined the band and drove for four hours from his home in southern California to Fresno every weekend to practice. Eventually, the drive became too costly, and he moved to Fresno to practice with the band. The band would then record their sophomore album, The Pillars of Humanity, which came out via Ocean Records. Around this time, Salomon would move away from the band and work on a rap project titled Native Son and the Foundation. Shortly after the release of the Native Son album, they broke up. In 1995, the Crucified played a reunion and final show. Throughout their career, the band had played alongside Pantera, D.R.I., G.B.H., Scaterd Few, and many others. Hoping to continue playing music, Salomon started a punk rock project called Outer Circle.

At the same time as Outer Circle, Salomon was working on the beginnings of what became Stavesacre, alongside former the Crucified guitarist Jeff Bellew and Focused Bassist Dirk Lemmenes. The three found Jeremy Moffett, who briefly was a part of Deliverance, and the band was formed. Following the formation of Stavesacre, Outer Circle ended, with the new band – deemed a supergroup – being Salomon's main focus. The band signed with Tooth & Nail Records and began writing and recording their debut album, Friction. In the process of the recording, Moffett quit the band. Salomon, Bellew, and Lemmenes would then begin the search for a new drummer, landing on former Scaterd Few drummer Sam West to play on the material. The four would then start to work on the band's second album, Absolutes, which would be released in 1997. Following Absolutes, Ryan Denee joined the band on rhythm guitars, however, Bellew departed from the band.

During his time in the Crucified and Stavesacre, Salomon was often called upon to lend vocals to songs by other bands, most notably Project 86, Argyle Park, CHATTERbOX, Focused, XL+Death Before Dishonor (DBD), and Mortal.

Salomon also is the author of Simplicity, an autobiography that tells of his formative years in Fresno, California, his development as a singer, and the band Stavesacre's struggles to fit into the Christian music scene (and why it eventually left the scene). Initially self-published, a revised version was released in 2005 by Relevant Books, a publishing house connected to Relevant Magazine. He is the singer in White Lighter with Steven Dail (Project 86, Neon Horse) on Northern Records.

== Personal life ==
Salomon resides in Florida with his wife Stephanie. He currently works for NASCAR.

== Bands ==
Current

- The Crucified (1986–1993, 2009–present)
- White Lighter (2010–present)
- Stavesacre (1995–2010, 2014–present)

Former

- Outer Circle (1993–1998)
- Native Son (1992–1993)
- Neon Horse (2007–2009)

== Discography ==
With the Crucified

- The Crucified (1988)
- The Pillars of Humanity (1991)

With Stavesacre

- Friction (1996)
- Absolutes (1997)
- Speakeasy (1999)
- Split/EP (2001)
- Collective (2001)
- Live from Deep Ellum (2002)
- (stāvz'ā'kər) (2002)
- Bull Takes Fighter (2004)
- How to Live With a Curse (2006)
- Against the Silence (2009)
- MCMXCV (2017)

With Neon Horse

- Neon Horse (2007)
- Haunted Horse: Songs of Love, Defiance, and Delusion (2009)

With Native Son

- Life in the Grave (1992)

With Outer Circle

- Outer Circle (1998)

With White Lighter

- White Lighter (2014)

=== Guest appearances ===
- Chatterbox – Despite (1991)
- Mortal – "Godspeed"
- XL + DBD – "Sodom and America"
- Argyle Park (AP2) – "Headscrew", "Gutterboy (I Am I Am)", "Doomsayer", "My Sympathies"
- Project 86 – "Last Meal"
- Focused – "Blinded"
- Blue Stahli – "You'll Get What's Coming"

== Never Was podcast ==
Salomon hosts a podcast entitled "Never Was". He has interviewed many musicians, producers, and people involved in the musical industry. The podcast resumed publication on July 20, 2026 after a 3,038 day hiatus.
