= LVL (musician) =

Background information
- Also known as: Level (formerly)
- Origin: New York City, New York
- Genres: Trance, industrial metal, Christian metal, drum and bass
- Years active: 1996–2017
- Labels: Flaming Fish, FiXT
- Members: Dan Levler

LVL (stylized as lvl) is both the solo music project and personal moniker for New York City musician Dan Albert. Formerly called Level, he changed his stage name to avoid confusion with others with the same name. His musical output ranges from fast-paced industrial metal to mellow electronica. Albert is the younger brother of musician Klayton.

== History ==
=== Early years ===
Dan Levler first appeared in the late 1980s as a member of Immortal, a New York thrash metal band fronted by Klayton. Immortal broke up and Klayton went on to found Circle of Dust, an industrial metal band that gained a strong cult following throughout the 1990s. In 1995 Albert performed as part of Argyle Park, another of Klayton's bands, for their first and only live show. Levler appeared on the Circle of Dust album Disengage in 1998 with two remixes credited to his name.

=== Flaming Fish Music years, 1997–2004 ===
In 1997 Albert signed to Flaming Fish Music and released his first song on a compilation, followed two years later by the debut full length album Devil's Advocate, which was composed of songs Levler had written from 1992 to 1996. The album has been described as mixing drum'n'bass, trance, and industrial metal. Only 1,000 copies of the album were pressed and it is now out of print. There were plans to send purchasers of Devil's Advocate a limited edition EP consisting of remixes and outtakes, but this fell through and only one remix of the song "She:Backslide", done by Klayton, ever surfaced.

While releasing Devil's Advocate, Albert also took part in the resurrection of Argyle Park, called AP2. Level was the primary songwriter on the reformed band's only album, Suspension of Disbelief, which was released in 2000. Two years later, Level worked on the fourth Criss Angel album, the soundtrack to Mindfreak, remixing material from the preceding Criss Angel Trilogy that had been written by Klayton while also contributing four of his own compositions.

Level's second solo album, Denial, was released by Flaming Fish in 2003 and almost entirely lacked the driving guitars of the debut album, featuring instead lush, moody synths and electronics; "the new album is mellow, although the tempos are up". Buka of Argyle Park contributed lyrics and vocals to the song "What Free Is". Denial was long delayed in being released, with six of the ten songs eventually being put online as mp3s to sate fans before the full album finally went on sale. Denial is also now out of print.

In 2004, Levler produced and performed programming on fellow New York artist Breather's Slowly Sinking EP for Flaming Fish Music. He also announced and took pre-orders for a retrospective release called Re:issue that would include both remasters and re-recordings of a selection of songs from Devil's Advocate and Denial, the Klayton remix of "She:Backslide", and some new material.

=== FiXT Music, 2005–present ===
Flaming Fish Music settled into dormancy and little was heard of lvl until 2006 when he was signed to Klayton's new label, FiXT Music. This is when Albert officially changed the name of his band from Level to lvl. He explained his absence since 2003's Denial and announced that he was working on new material in addition to the Re:issue project. However, apart from a handful of new demos, only one minor release has since been issued, that being a remix single of the song "Home" from the Denial album. Various financial and hardware problems, including a hard drive failure that deleted an album's worth of songs, have prevented lvl from moving forward with his new album work and Re:Issue seems to have been indefinitely delayed.

FiXT announced on August 21, 2017 that Devil's Advocate and Denial will be remastered and re-released, with several bonus tracks.

Levler has since left music behind and entered the world of labor unions and serves as president of New York State's largest independent labor union, Suffolk County Association of Municipal Employees.

== Discography ==
- Devil's Advocate (1999, Flaming Fish Music)
- Suspension of Disbelief (2000 Tooth & Nail Records; as part of AP2)
- Denial (2003, Flaming Fish Music)
- Home Re:mix (2007, Fixt)
- Devil's Advocate (Remastered) (2017, FiXT)
- Denial (Remastered) (2017, FiXT)

Compilation appearances

- Christmas in Heaven (1996, Flying Tart) – "Christmas Wishes" (as part of Backwoods)
- Lethal Injection (1997, Flaming Fish Music) – "What If?"
- "She:Backslide (Klay Scott Revision)" – unofficially leaked online in 1999/2000
- Automata 3.0 (2001, Flaming Fish Music) – "Restore (Demo)"
- Automata 5.0 (2003, Flaming Fish Music) – "Home (Blind Master)"
- Automata 7.0 (2007, Flaming Fish Music) – "Reaching Out"
- FiXT Music Comp 2008 (2008, FiXT) – "Home (Celldweller Remix)"

Remixes contributed

- Circle of Dust – "Levler 1 (Easier to Hate)" and "Levler 2 (Alone to Die)" on Disengage, 1998
- Klank – "Dark India Mix" on Numb, 1999
- Celldweller – "Symbiont (End Title Remix by Level)" on Symbiont Remixes, 2000
- Blue Stahli – "Metamorphosis - lvl Remix" on Metamorphosis (lvl Remix), 2017

Other appearances

- Criss Angel – Mindfreak (2002 soundtrack, Apitrag) – remixing, contributed four new songs
- Breather – Slowly Sinking EP (2004, Flaming Fish Music) – production and programming
