= Brainchild (Circle of Dust album) =

Studio album by Circle of Dust
- Released: February 8, 1994; April 29, 2016 (remaster)
- Genre: Industrial metal; thrash metal; electronic rock
- Label: R.E.X. Music; FiXT Music (remaster)
- Producer: Scott Albert

Original chronology
Circle of Dust (1992)	Brainchild (1994)	Circle of Dust (1995 version) (1995)

Remaster chronology
Circle of Dust (Remastered) (2016)	Brainchild (Remastered) (2016)	Misguided (Remastered) (2016)

Professional ratings
Review scores
Source	Rating
AllMusic	3/5 stars

Brainchild is the second studio album by the industrial metal band Circle of Dust, released in 1994 through R.E.X. Music and re-released as a remaster in 2016 through FiXT Music.

== Overview ==
Brainchild was originally a side project between Klayton and Doug Mann. Their album, Mindwarp, was released on R.E.X. Music in 1992. R.E.X. wanted Klayton to make a second Circle of Dust album, but there wasn't enough money to make another album, so R.E.X. re-released the album as the second Circle of Dust album, Brainchild. The same cover artwork and layout was used for both albums, with only the Album Artist ("Brainchild" to "Circle of Dust") and Album Title (Mindwarp to Brainchild) changed.

Three of tracks are different from the original Mindwarp versions. The original recording of "Deviate" was replaced with the 'Sawed-Off Shotgun Edit' version from Metamorphosis. "Prayers of a Dead Man" is replaced with a newer recording. The only obvious difference between the versions of "Telltale Crime" is the removal of the sound clip of Geraldo Rivera from the beginning of the track.

The album contains sound bites from James Cameron's movie Aliens, while the song "Deviate" contains samples from such sources as Ren & Stimpy, The Twilight Zone episode "The Mind and the Matter" and RoboCop 2.

A music video for "Telltale Crime" was released and is the only video the band made at the time. It includes the band's live musicians, Daren "Klank" Diolosa (of Klank) and Jason Tilton, as well as Chris Donohue on the Chapman Stick.

In 2010, HM Magazine ranked Brainchild number 37 on the Top 100 Christian Metal Albums of All Time list with Doc stating that "without a doubt, this is one of the coolest techno/industrial hybrid metal releases ever. Paradoxically, it was the relative presence of a song structure and memorable groove that really distinguished this release from other 'noisier' entries within the genre."

== Track listing ==
All tracks are written by Klayton and Doug Mann, except where noted.

No.	Title	Writer(s)	Length
1.	"Cranial Tyrant"		4:16
2.	"Telltale Crime"		4:18
3.	"Prayers of a Dead Man"		6:14
4.	"Regressor" (Aggressive Mix)		6:11
5.	"Enshrined"		4:04
6.	"Course of Ruin"		5:02
7.	"Descend"	Klayton	5:29
8.	"Deviate"	Klayton	5:06
9.	"Pale Reflection"		5:08
10.	"Aggressor" (Regressive Mix)		5:50

2016 Remastered Re-release: Disc 1
No.	Title	Writer(s)	Length
1.	"Cranial Tyrant"		4:11
2.	"Telltale Crime"		4:18
3.	"Prayers of a Dead Man"		6:16
4.	"Regressor" (Aggressive Mix)		6:11
5.	"Enshrined"		4:03
6.	"Course of Ruin"		5:01
7.	"Descend"	Klayton	5:29
8.	"Deviate"	Klayton	5:06
9.	"Pale Reflection"		5:07
10.	"Aggressor" (Regressive Mix)		5:50

2016 Remastered Re-release: Disc 2
No.	Title	Writer(s)	Length
1.	"Contagion"		5:25
2.	"Deviate" (Blue Stahli Remix)	Klayton	2:55
3.	"Am I in Sync?" (Steve Taylor cover)	Steve Taylor	5:49
4.	"Deviate (1992)"	Klayton	3:59
5.	"Telltale Crime (1992)"		4:29
6.	"Prayers of a Dead Man (1992)"		6:12
7.	"Dust 10"		4:55
8.	"Dust 11"		3:24
9.	"Dust 12"		2:06
10.	"Dust 13"		1:08
11.	"Dust 14"		4:30
12.	"Dust 15"		1:23
13.	"Twisted Reality" (1995 Live VHS Audio)		7:59
14.	"Deviate" (1995 Live VHS Audio)	Klayton	6:58
15.	"Deviate" (Blue Stahli Remix) (Instrumental)	Klayton	2:57
