= Neon Horse (album) =

Studio album by Neon Horse
- Released: May 8, 2007
- Recorded: 2007
- Genre: Indie rock
- Length: 30:22
- Label: Tooth & Nail

Professional ratings
Review scores
Source	Rating
AllMusic	3.5/5 stars
Jesus Freak Hideout	3/5 stars

Neon Horse is the debut album by the band Neon Horse. It was released on Tooth & Nail Records.

== Track listing ==
1. "Cuckoo!" – 2:25
2. "Speed Killz" – 2:21
3. "I Know—I Just Don't Care" – 2:25
4. "Crazy Daisy" – 2:37
5. "Kick Yer Askin' for It" – 2:36
6. "Go. Stop." – 2:08
7. "The Bathroom Wall" – 1:43
8. "Nice for You" – 1:44
9. "Little Lamb" – 3:15
10. "Pretty Face Divided" – 2:32
11. "Horsey" – 2:24
12. "Merciless Mother" – 4:12
