= Circle of Dust =

American industrial metal band

- The band's touring lineup, c. 1994 (L-R: Jason Tilton, Scott "Klayton" Albert, Daren "Klank" Diolosa)

Background information
- Origin: New York City, U.S.
- Genres: Industrial metal; industrial rock; electro-industrial; Christian metal (early)
- Years active: 1988–1998; 2015–present
- Labels: R.E.X.; Flying Tart; FiXT
- Members: Klayton
- Past members: Daren "Klank" Diolosa; John "og" Lopez; Jason Tilton; Chris Donahue; Rich "Wretch" Fantasia
- Website: circleofdust.net

Circle of Dust is an industrial music project from New York City created by Klayton, who later became known as Celldweller. The project was active as a band from 1988 to 1998 and then re-started in 2015 after Klayton gained back ownership of his old albums. The project has released four studio albums: Circle of Dust (1992, re-recorded in 1995), Brainchild (1994), Disengage (1998), and Machines of Our Disgrace (2016).

== History ==
=== Formation, Circle of Dust and Brainchild (1991–1995) ===
Klayton formed Circle of Dust in New York City after the disbandment of his former late '80s thrash metal outfit Immortal. Signed to R.E.X. Records in 1991, Klayton self-recorded and self-produced all of the Circle of Dust material. The self-titled debut album, released by R.E.X. in 1992, has been described as "post-Pretty Hate Machine industrial pop". That same year, Klayton, using the pseudonym Tox, teamed up with R.E.X. president Doug Mann that same year to create Brainchild and release Mindwarp, which featured music more intense than Circle of Dust's debut and showcased dark cyberpunk-esque lyrics that were largely political in nature, and harsher, more thrash-influenced metal guitars. The now-defunct television show MTV Sports used part of the song "Deviate" for its long-time intro. After the release of both albums, Klayton also produced the Metamorphosis compilation (1993), which collected outtakes from Circle of Dust, Mindwarp, and Living Sacrifice's Nonexistent, the latter of which featured Klayton's programming work. The compilation also included Klayton's own remixes of songs from each of those three albums.

In 1994, R.E.X. obtained a new distribution deal and pressed Klayton for a new release. As a stopgap measure, he re-recorded and remixed portions of Brainchild's Mindwarp album and re-issued it under the Circle of Dust moniker, altering the cover art to reflect the album's new status. R.E.X., however, urged Klayton, who was touring incessantly, to record a brand-new album; instead, Klayton opted to completely re-record the Circle of Dust's debut and album, the sonic quality of which he had been strongly dissatisfied with. This re-issue (1995), with vastly improved musicianship and recording quality, scrapped three songs and included four new ones, but retained identical artwork. Circle of Dust toured heavily to promote both re-issues. The live touring band, by this point, included Daren "Klank" Diolosa on guitars, Chris Donohue on bass and keyboard, and Jason Tilton on drums.

=== Hiatus and side projects (1995–1998) ===
In between touring and recording for Circle of Dust, Klayton kept busy with a variety of other projects. In 1994, he contributed to and produced a side project with members of The Crucified called Chatterbox, which released Despite, its sole album. That same year, Klayton teamed up with friend Buka and began work on yet another side project, Argyle Park, under three pseudonyms: Dred, Deathwish, and Celldweller. Argyle Park featured numerous guest collaborators, including Tommy Victor of Prong, JG Thirlwell of Foetus, and Mark Salomon (Stavesacre, The Crucified). In 1996, Klayton produced and programmed Still Suffering, the debut album of former Circle of Dust guitarist Daren "Klank" Diolosa. The unreleased songs Klank had written for Circle of Dust the year prior ended up on this album.

After Klayton put Circle of Dust on hiatus in 1995, he worked with illusionist Criss Angel to work on theatrical music and a magic show called Angeldust. It was during his work with Angel that Klayton changed his name from Scott Albert to Klay Scott, a nickname Angel gave him to denote his ability to "take sounds and shape them as if they were clay". Klayton and Angel worked for over two years to finalize their multi-media show and released an initial album of music in 1998 called Musical Conjurings from the World of Illusion. During that same period of creativity, Klayton also recorded a posthumous Circle of Dust album as a formal gesture of farewell.

=== Disengage (1998) ===
Klayton in a promotional image for Disengage, c. 1998

Released in 1998 by Flying Tart Records, Disengage marked the formal end of Circle of Dust and contained reworkings of earlier songs (1991–1995) Klayton had written, some of which he had intended to release back in 1995 on a new Circle of Dust album. Klayton had rearranged and melded these older songs with new forms of music with which Klayton had been experimenting, thus becoming hybrids of Klayton's older, faster, riff-based industrial-metal style and newer dance and ambient influences, with a stronger focus on songwriting. Thus the album was markedly different, musically, from the earlier Circle of Dust and Brainchild albums. Klayton closed the album with a selection of remixes, two of which were produced by Dan Leveler, who, it was later revealed, was Klayton's younger brother and who later became a solo industrial/electronic artist in his own right, recording under the name Level. The liner notes of Disengage contains excerpts of an interview in which Klayton explained why he had disbanded Circle of Dust and started anew with Angeldust.

Although Klayton intended to release Disengage in 1997 and precede its release with an EP of Disengage remixes titled Refractorchasm, Flying Tart canceled the EP's release and delayed Disengage until 1998, requiring Klayton to tack the EP onto Disengage in order to ensure the release of the music. Within two weeks of signing his contract with Flying Tart, the label was bought out and dissolved, ensuring the album saw extremely limited distribution.

=== Return and Machines of Our Disgrace (2015–2017) ===
In November 2015, Klayton announced that he had obtained the rights to the entire Circle of Dust catalog, including the Metamorphosis compilation and Argyle Park side project, and decided to revive his Circle of Dust moniker, stating on YouTube, "I ... decided to dive back into production as Circle of Dust for the new Celldweller album. I wanted to take what I'm doing now and reinterpret it in the way I used to produce. ... There is an official Circle of Dust remix of "Jericho" on End of an Empire. ... There's another track coming, brand-new, with Circle of Dust involved in the production, and it will be in your hands before the end of this year." Klayton also announced the 2016 re-release (with bonus content) of the entire Circle of Dust catalog on his FiXT label.

On March 4, 2016, Klayton released the remaster of the 1992 self-titled album, which included a bonus track on the deluxe edition, "Neophyte", from the fifth studio album coming in December 2016. Also included in the deluxe edition are instrumental demos, a remix on "Nothing Sacred" from Blue Stahli, an acoustic version of "Onenemy", and their instrumental tracks. Circle of Dust's fifth studio album, Machines of Our Disgrace, was released in December 2016, on Klayton's own label FiXT.

== Musical style and reception ==
Circle of Dust was popular in Christian alternative metal circles during most of the 1990s. In writing the Encyclopedia of Contemporary Christian Music, Mark Allan Powell refers to the band as "the quintessential Christian industrial rock group." In the early 2000s, a small independent record company called Retroactive Records obtained the rights to the old Circle of Dust, Argyle Park, Brainchild, and Metamorphosis albums, remastered them, and re-issued them in limited runs of 1,000 each.

As early as 1994, Circle of Dust (along with Argyle Park) had been criticized by some Christian music press and by numerous fans for not having religious enough lyrics. These issues culminated in Klayton abandoning the Christian music industry entirely after the release of Disengage, a decision he explained at great length in a 1998 interview with HM Magazine.

== Members ==
=== Current ===
- Scott "Klayton" Albert

=== Former ===
- Daren "Klank" Diolosa
- John "og" Lopez
- Jason Tilton
- Chris Donahue
- Rich "Wretch" Fantasia

== Discography ==
=== Albums ===
Year	Album	Label
1992	Circle of Dust	R.E.X.
1994	Brainchild (remastered 2016)	R.E.X.
1995	Circle of Dust (1995 re-recording, remastered 2016)	R.E.X.
1998	Disengage (remastered 2016)	Flying Tart
2016	Machines of Our Disgrace	FiXT Music
2019	Circle of Dust (Demos & Rarities)	FiXT Music
2021	Circle of Dust (25th Anniversary Edition)	FiXT Music

=== Other releases ===
- Telltale Crime (1992 VHS release of "Telltale Crime" video)
- Celldweller's End of an Empire – "Jericho (Circle of Dust Remix)" (2015)
- Scandroid featuring Circle of Dust's "Pro-bots & Robophobes" (2016)

=== Music videos ===
Year	Song	Director
1992	"Telltale Crime"	–
2016	"Contagion"	Klayton
2016	"Machines of Our Disgrace"	Klayton
2016	"alt_Human"	Klayton

=== Singles ===
Year	Song	Album
2016	"Contagion"	Machines of Our Disgrace
2016	"Neophyte"	Machines of Our Disgrace
2016	"Machines of Our Disgrace"	Machines of Our Disgrace
2017	"Dust to Dust"	Machines of Our Disgrace (Definitive Edition)
2025	"Invisible World"	Machines of Our Disgrace (Definitive Edition)

=== Compilation appearances ===
- Circle of Dust/Brainchild split 7-inch EP (1993, R.E.X.) – "Dissolved" (Circle of Dust) and "Telltale Crime" (Brainchild)
- Metamorphosis: Brainchild / Living Sacrifice / Circle of Dust Remixes (1993, R.E.X.) – "Dissolved (Disintegration Dub)", "Consequence (Temporary Mix)", "Consequence (Eternal Mix)", "Self Inflict" and "Daraq"
- I Predict a Clone: A Steve Taylor Tribute (1994, R.E.X.) – "Am I in Sync?"
- Can You Dig It? III (1994, R.E.X.) – "Regressor (Aggressive Mix)" and "Dissolved"
- Doom & Gloom: Visions of the Apocalypse (1995, Nesak International Records) – "Parasite"
- Compe Noctem Volume 1 (1998, Bleeding Edge Media/Carpe Noctem Magazine) – "Goodbye"
- Jack of All Trades - Master of None: An Unauthorized Discography of the Works of Klay Scott (1999 authorized bootleg) – "Refractor" (with interview intro), "Deviate", "Rational Lies", "Onenemy" (unreleased acoustic demo), "Heldweller" and a Klay Scott interview
- Jack of All Trades - Master of None 2: An Unauthorized Discography of the Works of Klay Scott (2000 authorized bootleg) – "Nothing Sacred", "Descend" (Brainchild), "Consequence (Temporary Mix)", "Dissolved (Disintegration Dub)", "Consequence (Eternal Mix)", "Chasm", "Am I in Sync?" and "Goodbye"
- Lightning Strikes Twice: A Retroactive Records Sampler (2006, Retroactive Records) – "Regressor"
- Lightning Strikes Twice Again (Vol Two) (2006, Retroactive Records) – "Refractor"
