= Mortal (band) =

American Christian industrial/dance band

- Also known as: Mortal Wish
- Origin: Loma Linda, California, US
- Genres: Industrial metal, industrial dance, Christian rock
- Years active: 1988–1996; 2002
- Past members: Jerome Fontamillas; Jyro Xhan; Ed Benrock; Troy Yasuda; Strobe

Mortal was a Christian industrial/dance band fronted by Jerome Fontamillas and Jyro Xhan. Both members went on to found the alternative rock group Fold Zandura, and for a time were members of both bands simultaneously. The band is known for its lyrical intelligence, incorporating advanced theology with what has been billed as "Industrial Praise and Worship." According to CCM Magazine "Mortal has had a much greater influence... on industrial music than its modest output would suggest."

== Background ==
Led by the duo Jerome Fontamillas and Jyro Xhan, Mortal was one of the first Christian bands to play industrial metal. While not actually the first to do so, Mortal enjoyed significant success, and, along with other early contemporaries such as Circle of Dust and Argyle Park, played a notable role in paving the way for future Christian industrial and industrial metal bands.

The group began in 1988 as Mortal Wish, and produced a six-song demo with additional members Ray Tongpo and Wilson Peralta. They shortened their name, signed a record deal with Intense Records and released their first album Lusis in 1992, produced by Terry Scott Taylor and Allan Aguirre of Scaterd Few. It was well received by the critics, with CCM Magazine dubbing Lusis the "strongest debut project to enter the Christian market in years." The second album Fathom (1993) was Mortal's most guitar-driven, and became one of the band's most popular releases. The song ”Rift” was rearranged later and a music video was shot for it in 1994. The video dealt with the horrors of child abuse.

Mortal later experimented with a live band, and a grunge sound on 1994's Wake, as well as with a dance-based meditational sound on their follow-up, Pura.

During this time, the band became mired in legal issues involving their label, leading to on-again, off-again attempts to retire the name Mortal. As Jyro would report to True Tunes News in 1994: "I have peace with the fact that Mortal will permanently quit... There are legal things happening with our label that will end Mortal as a name." The duo formed Fold Zandura partly to get around these issues, partly to carve out a more alternative rock sound. Fold Zandura released one album and three EPs.

The Mortal moniker was revived in order to release a self-titled album on 5 Minute Walk Records in 1996. According to the liner notes, three songs were originally Fold Zandura songs. In 1998, they released a best-of compilation called Godspeed. It featured 13 album songs and two non-album songs.

In 2000, Jerome joined Switchfoot as a session musician and later joined them full-time.

In 2002 Jyro and Jerome released a Mortal reunion album called Nu-En-Jin with Tooth & Nail Records, featuring an updated industrial sound, consisting mostly of heavily distorted looping electronics. Lyrically, the songs have a very sci-fi flare, with the liner notes detailing the various fictional alternative universes in which they are supposedly set.

== Members ==
Last known lineup

- Jerome Fontamillas – bass, vocals
- Jyro Xhan – guitar, vocals

Former

- Ed Benrock – drums (1994–1995), formerly of Lifesavers Underground
- Troy Yasuda – guitar (1994–1996)

Live and session

- Jeff Bellew (The Crucified, Stavesacre) – guitar (1993)
- Bryan Gray (The Blamed, ex-Left Out) – bass (1993)
- Jim Chaffin (The Crucified, Deliverance, The Blamed) – drums (1993)

== Discography ==
- 1992: Lusis (Intense Records, Reviews: Cross Rhythms, CCM Magazine)
- 1993: Fathom (Intense Records, Review: Cross Rhythms)
- 1993: Intense Live Series Vol. 5 (Intense Records)
- 1994: Wake (Intense Records, Cross Rhythms, CCM Magazine)
- 1995: Pura (Intense Records, Review: Cross Rhythms)
- 1996: Mortal (5 Minute Walk, Reviews: The Lighthouse, CCM Magazine)
- 1998: Godspeed (KMG Records, compilation, Review: HM Magazine)
- 2002: Nu-En-Jin (Tooth & Nail Records, Reviews: Cross Rhythms, The Phantom Tollbooth, Allmusic, HM Magazine)

== Charts ==
Year	Album	Chart	Peak
1993	Fathom	Top Contemporary Christian	32
1994	Wake	Top Contemporary Christian	21
