= Ghoti Hook =

American punk band (1991-2002)

- Origin: Fairfax, Virginia, United States
- Genres: Punk rock, pop punk
- Years active: 1990–2002, 2009, 2022–present
- Label: Tooth & Nail
- Members: Joel Bell; Adam Neubauer; Jamie Tolosa
- Past members: Justin Levy; Mark Lacasse; Christian Ergueta; Conrad Tolosa

Ghoti Hook (/ˈɡoʊti ˌhʊk/ GOH-tee huuk) is an American punk band from Fairfax, Virginia. The band formed in 1991, signed to Tooth & Nail Records in 1996, and disbanded in 2002.

== History ==
Joel Bell, Adam Neubauer, and Justin Levy formed the group in 1991. Conrad Tolosa and Christian Ergueta, who also went to the same youth group, joined the band shortly after. Levy left the band after one year to pursue other interests. Conrad's cousin, Jamie Tolosa, was asked to join the band soon after. In 1994, they started to develop their pop-punk sound. The group released two independent EPs in 1994 and 1995, both produced by Kevin 131 at Assembly Line Studios. They built a following primarily in central Pennsylvania (PA). Ghoti Hook signed to Tooth & Nail Records in 1996, then released four albums: Sumo Surprise, Banana Man, Songs We Didn't Write, and Two Years To Never.

Conrad, the guitarist and a primary songwriter of the band, decided to leave Ghoti Hook after the release of "Banana Man" and the subsequent tour promoting its release. He left the band when the band began to tour full-time so he could finish seminary and continue with his accounting career. His last show was in the fall of 1997 at a show promoted by Javacasa in Lebanon, PA. Mark Lacasse joined on lead guitar in 1998 and helped to write and record "Two Years to Never". Ergueta left the band sometime after the recording of "Two Years to Never" with Lacasse leaving a few months later.

As a three-piece band, and as their last ever studio recordings, Ghoti Hook released a six-song EP titled EP on Velvet Blue Music. The group disbanded in 2002. The band's last concert was at Cornerstone Music Festival on July 6, 2002, with guest performances by Conrad and Lacasse. The concert was recorded and released as a live album entitled Rest In Peace.

The band played a reunion show on June 13, 2009, at Circle of Hope in Philadelphia, PA with the (also reunited) Huntingtons, Speedy Delivery, 274, and Main Line Riders. The performance was part of a benefit concert to support Jeannie Pierce, wife of Huntingtons' drummer Mikey Pierce, who was suffering from brain cancer. The band performed as the final three-piece lineup along with an appearance from Conrad Tolosa on guitar for five songs.

In November 2022, the band posted pictures of themselves on their Facebook page rehearsing songs, leading to speculation that they had regrouped. This was later confirmed with an announcement that the group would be participating at Furnace Fest in September 2023.

The band played a small-club reunion show on September 9, 2023, at Jammin' Java in Vienna, VA, with The Throes as an opening act.

== Name ==
The word "ghoti" is a famous joke respelling of the word "fish", invented in the 19th century as an example of the irregularities of English spelling. Pronunciation: the "GH" as in the word "rouGH", "O" as in "wOmen" and "TI" as in naTIon. However, the band pronounces its name more intuitively.

== Members ==
Current lineup

- Joel Bell – lead vocals (1990–2002, 2009, 2022–present), guitar (2000–2002, 2009, 2022–present)
- Adam Neubauer (also known as Chachi Manchu) – drums (1990–2002, 2009, 2022–present)
- Jamie Tolosa – bass (2000–2002, 2009, 2022–present), backing vocals (1991–2002, 2009, 2022–present), guitar (1991–2000)

Former members

- Justin Levy – guitar (1990–1991)
- Conrad Tolosa – guitar (1991–1997)
- Christian Ergueta – bass, backing vocals (1991–2000)
- Mark Lacasse – guitar (1998–2000)

Timeline

== Discography ==
- No Date (EP) (self-released, 1994)
- Boca Grande (EP) (self-released, 1995)
- Sumo Surprise (Tooth & Nail Records, 1996)
- Banana Man (Tooth & Nail Records, 1997)
- Songs We Didn't Write (cover album) (Tooth & Nail Records, 1998)
- Two Years to Never (Tooth & Nail Records, 2000)
- Six Songs Ep (Velvet Blue Music, 2002)
- Retrospective (compilation album) (Tooth & Nail Records, 2002)
- Rest in Peace (live album) (Tooth & Nail Records, 2003)
