= Focused (band) =

American hardcore punk band

- Origin: Long Beach, California
- Genres: Christian hardcore, Christian metalcore
- Years active: 1991–1996, 2000–2001, 2009
- Label: Tooth & Nail
- Past members: Tim Mann; Jeff Boetto; John Schoettler; Matt Archuleta; Al Christensen; Dirk Lemmenes; Mike Merryman; Jason Parker; Chris Bowden; Alex Albert; Andrew Reizuch; Adam Valles; Brett Barber; Gary Wilson; Jim Rupe; Eric Wilkins
- Website: Focused on Facebook

Focused was a hardcore punk band that originated out of Long Beach, California in 1991, with a Christian hardcore style. The band broke up in 1996, but reunited briefly in 2009.

== History ==
Focused began in 1991, created by Tim Mann on vocals, John Schoettler on rhythm guitar, Matt Archuletta on bass, and Jeff Boetto (No For An Answer, Half-Off), on lead guitar. The band played their first song live at a local talent show without an official drummer and asked their friend David Shoemaker to fill-in for that one night. The band would soon bring on Al Christensen on drums. The band played their first official show alongside bands such as Mean Season, Unbroken, and Strife. The following night the band played their second official show at the Irvine Bren Events Center alongside bands such The Crucified, Mortal and Deliverance. The band recorded two demos, 'Situation Within’ in 1991 and At Eternity's Gate in 1993.

By mid-1992, Boetto and Archuleta had left, to be replaced by Mike Merryman on lead guitar and Dirk Lemmenes on bass. Schoettler left in mid-1993 after recording At Eternity’s Gate; Jason Parker replaced him. This new line-up signed with Tooth & Nail Records, and began recording their debut album, Bow, which was released as the label's second release. Shortly after the release of that album, Parker departed and Andrew Reizuch took his place on tour. Christensen left the band in 1994, and was replaced by Chris Bowden. Chris Bowden and Andrew Reizuch would be part of the new line-up to write and record their second album.

In 1994, the band embarked on a tour called 40 Days and 40 Nights, alongside Chatterbox and Unashamed. They also met with Blenderhead and MxPx on that tour at a few shows. The tour lasted from June 24 to July 30. They toured with Bloodshed the following year, and began working on their second album, The Hope That Lies Within, also released on Tooth & Nail. It received an enthusiastic, ten-bar rating from Cross Rhythms. In 1996, the band broke up.

In 2000, Mann brought the band back together to release the three-song 2000 EP. The lineup at the time consisted of new members aside from Mann, with Brett Barber and Gary Wilson on guitars, Jim Rupe (ex-Every Day Life) on bass, and Adam Valles on drums.

They were asked to play on Demon Hunter's "Huntour" in 2009, along with Living Sacrifice, Throwdown, Advent and others. The classic line-up of Mann, Merryman, Parker, and Lemmenes, with former Project 86 drummer Alex Albert joining the band on drums, participated in the tour.

In 2019, Steadfast Records, a record label that had released the debut Zao album, All Else Failed, announced the re-release of Focused's demo At Eternity's Gate, which would include vinyl and CDs.

== Members ==
2009 reunion lineup

Name	Instrument	Years active	Other groups
Timothy "Tim" Mann	vocals	1991-1996, 2000-2001, 2009	Resolve, Flowers for June
Mike Merryman	guitar	1992-1994, 2009	
Jason Parker	guitar	1993-1994, 2009	
Dirk Lemmenes	bass	1992-1996, 2009	Stavesacre, Enemy Ships, the Lost Chorus
Alex Albert	drums	2009	Project 86, Crash Rickshaw, the Lost Chorus

Other former members

Name	Instrument	Years active	Other groups
Jeff Boetto	guitar	1991-1992	No For An Answer, Straight Arm, Half-Off
John Schoettler	guitar	1991-1993	
Andrew Reizuch	guitar	1994-1996	Le Shok, Treadwell
Gary Wilson	guitar	2000-2001	
Brett Barber	guitar	2000-2001	
Jim Rupe	bass	2000-2001	Every Day Life, Resolve
Matt Archuleta	bass	1991-1992	
Al Christensen	drums	1991-1994	
Chris Bowden	drums	1994-1996	Left Neglect, Other Desert Cities, Chris's Farm, the Merbabies
Adam Valles	drums	2000-2001	

Live musicians

- David Shoemaker – drums (1991)

Timeline

== Discography ==
Studio albums

- Bow (1993, Tooth & Nail Records)
- The Hope That Lies Within (1995, Tooth & Nail Records)

EPs

- At Eternity's Gate (2019, Steadfast Records)

Compilation albums

- The Wheels of Progress (1992–1996) (1999, Gunshow Records)

Demos

- Situation Within (1991)
- Eternity's Gate (1993)

== Awards ==
Dove Awards

- 1996 - Hard Music Album: The Hope that Lies Within (nominated)
