= The Crucified =

American hardcore/crossover thrash band

- Also known as: Kids in God's Blessings (K.G.B)
- Origin: Fresno, California, U.S.
- Genres: Christian hardcore; hardcore punk; crossover thrash
- Years active: 1984–1993, 1995, 2009–present
- Labels: Narrowpath, Ocean, Tooth & Nail
- Members: Mark Salomon; Greg Minier; Jeff Bellew; Jim Chaffin
- Past members: Wayne Stonecipher; Kirk Palmer; Trevor Palmer; Mark Johnson
- Website: thecrucified.net

The Crucified is an American Christian hardcore and crossover thrash band from Fresno, California that formed in 1984. Its lineup is vocalist Mark Salomon, guitarist Greg Minier, bassist Jeff Bellew, and drummer Jim Chaffin. The band are considered "pioneers of Christian hardcore." During their initial 1984–1993 tenure, the band played at the Cornerstone Festival several times, and also opened for non-religious punk and metal bands like D.R.I. and Pantera. The band broke up in 1993 due to personal differences, but reunited in 2009.

== History ==
=== Formation (1984–1985) ===
In late 1984, drummer Jim Chaffin, guitarist Greg Minier, bassist Kirk Palmer, and vocalist Wayne Stonecipher started a band named K.G.B. in Fresno, California The four teens knew each other as high school classmates. The name K.G.B. had no meaning to it, the members just thought initials "sounded cool". In early 1985, K.G.B. was looking for a new vocalist due to the departure of Stonecipher. Minier asked his friend Mark Salomon to try out as vocalist.

Salomon was accepted into the band after singing a few songs the band wrote with Stonecipher. Sensing pressure to have a meaning behind the name K.G.B., the band said the initials stood for Kids in God's Blessings. Not long after, the band thought the name sounded juvenile and changed it to The Crucified. The name came from Chaffin thinking of random names that would fit a Christian band. The Crucified added the Bible verse to the name whenever they wrote it. "For I have been crucified with Christ, therefore I no longer live, but Christ lives in me."

=== Demos and The Crucified (1985–1991) ===
After almost a year of writing and practicing in the Palmer's living room, the guys recorded 10 songs on a demo tape under the name K.G.B., but it was never circulated. Soon after, Kirk Palmer left the band and was replaced by his brother Trevor. In 1986, The Crucified gathered together a small amount of money and recorded 15 songs on a tape named Take up Your Cross under their new name, The Crucified, and distributed the demo throughout their local area and via mail order. "Nailed", the band's second demo, was recorded the following year and the band's exposure continued to grow. Shortly after "Nailed" was recorded, the band members graduated from high school and Palmer left the group and was replaced by Mark Johnson. The band recorded "Live at the New Order" in March 1989.

Greg Sostrom saw The Crucified at a few shows and offered them a recording contract with his new start-up label, Narrowpath Records. The band accepted the offer and started to record songs at Casbah Studios in Southern California. The 15-track album was titled The Crucified. It was released in compact disc format, which was a new format in the late 1980s. After the album's release, the band started to tour around California, including appearances at the Cornerstone Festival as well as opening for D.R.I., G.B.H., and Pantera. Johnson was fired from the band due to personal differences and the guys started looking for a new bassist. Chaffin responded to an ad in a newspaper posted by Jeff Bellew, citing The Crucified as an influence. Bellew joined the band and drove for four hours from his home in So Cal to Fresno every weekend to practice. Eventually the drive became too costly, and he moved to Fresno to practice with the band.

=== The Pillars of Humanity and breakup (1991–1995) ===
After recruiting Bellew, the band started to write and record for their second studio album, The Pillars of Humanity. When the album was released 1991 on Ocean Records the band did not tour very much for the album. In 1993, the band announced their breakup. However, they did not play their final show until 1995, at Cornerstone Festival.

The circumstances of the band's breakup are unclear. According to Bellew, Minier had been kicked out of the band at the time due to a controversy that the band did not want to address. With Minier out of the band, the band briefly hired Jon Maddux of Deliverance to fill in on guitar. By this time, Salomon had moved away to a different part of California and struggled with finding a job and the meaning of his life, which left Bellew and Chaffin as the only members remaining nearby, until Chaffin disbanded the group.

In 1995 the band reunited and played their final show at Cornerstone Festival. The members all went on to join new projects including, Stavesacre, Neon Horse, The Blamed, CHATTERbOX, and Applehead.

In 2010, HM Magazine listed The Pillars of Humanity as #37 on their list of the Top 100 Christian Rock Albums of All Time. Drummer Jason Dunn of No Innocent Victim and Sonny Sandoval of P.O.D. commented on the album's legacy as part of HMs list, with Dunn calling it the reason he "started playing drums," and Sandoval calling it "the first 'Christian' album I'd ever heard."

=== Box-set, Pillars re-issue and live shows (2008–present) ===
After their breakup, the band tried "for years" to acquire rights to re-release their music from their previous label, Ocean Records. This effort would ultimately lead to their reunion, with bassist Bellew approaching Chaffin and Solomon in 2009 and proposing that the band play enough shows to buy their music rights. In 2009, the band was able to acquire their music from Ocean Records and put together a commemorative box-set of their discography, released through Tooth & Nail Records. On November 17, 2009, Tooth & Nail Records re-released The Pillars of Humanity.

The band played their first show in 14 years on June 14, 2009, at the Calvary Chapel Golden Springs in Diamond Bar, California. The band also returned to play at the Cornerstone Festival in July 2009, a reunion show that HM magazine reviewers called "a fantastic display of raw power and energy ... [for] a band reuniting after over a decade".

The band performed their first show overseas on October 31, 2009, at the Nordic Festival in Oslo, Norway.

Around 2016, the band began to taper off their shows and activity on social media, marking the hiatus of the band.

== Influences ==
The band has cited Minor Threat and Metallica as musical influences. Additionally, their Fresno location has served as inspiration, with a tongue-in-cheek note from the band's biography stating: "funny what one can accomplish when surrounded by miles of nothing."

== Members ==
Current members
Name	Instrument	Years	Other groups
Mark Salomon	vocals	1985–1993, 2009–present	CHATTERBoX, Neon Horse, Outer Circle, Stavesacre, White Lighter
Greg Minier	guitar	1984–1993, 2009–present	Applehead, Minier
Jeff Bellew	bass	1990–1993, 2009–present	Argyle Park, CHATTERBoX, Stavesacre,
Jim Chaffin	drums	1984–1993, 2009–present	Fasedown, The Blamed, Deliverance, Once Dead, Lifesavers Underground, Mortal, Left Out, Sarge Loda, Three Kings

Former members
Name	Instrument	Years	Other groups
Wayne Stonecipher	vocals	1984–1985 (with KGB)	
Kirk Palmer	bass/keyboards	1984–1986 (with KGB)	
Trevor Palmer	bass	1986–1988	
Mark Johnson	bass	1988–1989	Martyr, Blessing the Hogs, Snail, P.A.S.T.E.
Jon Maddux	guitars	1993	Deliverance

Timeline

== Discography ==
Studio albums

Year	Album details
1989	The Crucified: Released: 1989; Label: Narrowpath; Format: CD, LP, cassette
1991	The Pillars of Humanity: Released: 1991; Label: Ocean; Format: CD, cassette,
2009	The Complete Collection: Released: June 30, 2009; Label: Tooth & Nail; Format: CD

Demos

Year	Demo details
1985	KGB: Released: 1985; Label: independent; Format: cassette
1985	Take up Your Cross: Released: 1986; Label: independent; Format: cassette
1986	Nailed: Released: 1987; Label: independent; Format: cassette
1989	Live at the New Order: Released: 1989; Label: independent; Format: cassette
1992	Nailed/Take up Your Cross: Released: 1993; Label: Tooth & Nail; Format: CD, cassette
