= R.E.X. Records =

American defunct independent record label

- Founded: 1987
- Founder: Doug Mann, Gavin Morkel
- Defunct: 1995
- Status: Defunct
- Distributors: Diamante Music Group, Light Distribution
- Genre: Christian metal
- Country of origin: U.S.
- Location: New Jersey; Chicago, Illinois; Nashville, Tennessee

R.E.X. Records, also known as R.E.X. Music, was an independent record label founded by Doug Mann and Gavin Morkel, which operated from 1987 until running into financial difficulty in 1995. Operations were based in Chicago until 1990 when the company moved to Nashville. The label was artistic in nature, and though they were especially active in the Christian metal genre some acts (such as Circle of Dust) were also marketed to mainstream audiences. Sublabels included Storyville Records and Street Level Records, founded by Randy Stonehill.

== Operations ==
In Christian markets, their records were distributed by the Diamante Music Group until 1995 when they switched to Light Distribution (see Light Records), by then a division of Platinum Entertainment. In general markets they were distributed by RED. By 1996 R.E.X was experiencing layoffs and looking for a buyer. Platinum acquired the label in July 1996.

In 1997 R.E.X. sued Platinum for breach of contract, asserting that Platinum had not properly distributed their product and had misrepresented their financial position in the buyout.

For a short time R.E.X. provided distribution for Jesus People USA's Grrr Records. Employee Alex Parker left and began Flying Tart in 1990. Founder Doug Mann took a position with ForeFront Records in April 1993.

== Artists ==
- Argyle Park (changed name to AP2, then disbanded)
- Believer (active, independent)
- Bliss Bliss (changed name to BlissBliss, active, independent)
- Circle of Dust (active; members went on to form Angeldust, Argyle Park, CHATTERbOX, Klank and Celldweller)
- The Choir (active, with Galaxy21 Music)
- Code of Ethics (active, currently signed with Razberry Records)
- Crashdog (on indefinite hiatus)
- Crimson Thorn (on hiatus)
- Detritus (active, members in Seventh Angel)
- Fleming & John (active, with Dweeb Records)
- Four Living Creatures (disbanded; members went on to form Sweet Nectar, Elder and Fell Desire)
- Haven (disbanded)
- Hot Pink Turtle (disbanded; High School Buddies of Dig Hay Zoose; together, members went on to form Dev Null)
- The Lead (disbanded; members went on to form Frank's Enemy)
- Leader Dogs for the Blind (disbanded)
- Living Sacrifice (active, with Solid State Records)
- Kerry Livgren (inactive)
- Killed By Cain (disbanded)
- Rose (inactive)
- Mercy Rule (disbanded)
- No Laughing Matter (inactive)
- Paramaecium (disbanded; members went on to form InExordium and Revulsed)
- Passafist (disbanded)
- Rocketboy (disbanded)
- Sacrament (disbanded)
- Six Feet Deep (disbanded; members went on to form Brandtson)
- Sixpence None the Richer (active, with Credential Recordings)
- Sweet Nectar (disbanded)
- The Throes (active, currently unsigned)
- The Walk (active under name BRIDGE PROPHETS)
- Trytan (disbanded)
- Veni Domine (disbanded)
- Whitecross (active, with Dark Star Records)

== See also ==
- List of record labels
- Tooth & Nail Records, successor to R.E.X. in the propagation of Christian metal and alternative music
