= Stavesacre =

American rock band

- Origin: Huntington Beach, California
- Genres: Metalcore (early); emo
- Years active: 1995–2010, 2014–present
- Labels: Tooth & Nail, Nitro, Abacus
- Spinoff of: The Crucified
- Members: Mark Salomon; Ryan Dennee; Dirk Lemmenes; Sam West; Jeff Bellew
- Past members: Jeremy Moffett; Neil Samoy
- Website: stavesacre.com

Stavesacre is an American rock band from Huntington Beach, California formed in 1995. The band is composed of vocalist Mark Salomon, guitarists Jeff Bellew and Ryan Dennee, bassist Dirk Lemmenes and drummer Sam West.

Stavesacre has released six studio albums, two EPs, one split album, one compilation, and one DVD.

In 2007, the band stated they would disband following the recording of new songs with original guitarist Jeff Bellew, who had departed in 1999 after the recording of Speakeasy. Those songs were released in the 2009 Against the Silence EP/DVD documentary.

However, after a period of inactivity, the band began writing new music in 2014, and in 2016 the group announced a crowdfunding project for its sixth studio album. MCMXCV was released in August 2017.

== History ==
Stavesacre was formed in 1995 as a post-hardcore band following the breakup of the Crucified. Vocalist Mark Salomon and guitarist Jeff Bellew played in The Crucified and, following its disbandment, the two still had a desire to write music. Salomon and Bellew recruited bassist Dirk Lemmenes and drummer Jeremy Moffett. They knew Lemmenes from his former band, Focused, which The Crucified toured with. Salomon and Moffett had been roommates for a while, and Moffett played in the band the Blamed.

They signed to Tooth & Nail Records because The Crucified was on the label and Salomon enjoyed working with the label owners. The band soon got to work on its debut album, Friction, which was released on June 7, 1996. After the album's release, Moffett left the band and was replaced by former Scaterd Few drummer Sam West. The following year, they released Absolutes. AllMusic reviewer Stephen Thomas Erlewine gave the album four out of five stars, saying the lyrics didn't stand out to him but "the sound is so heavy and foreboding that the lack of strong writing becomes a moot point." Following the release of Absolutes, Ryan Dennee joined the band as a second guitarist. Bellew soon departed to focus on his marriage; however, he recorded additional guitars for the band's next album.

Their third studio album, Speakeasy, was released on November 16, 1999. Doug Van Pelt of HM magazine praised the album and its lyrics, saying, "Lyrically, the band seems to open up its heart for surgery." Speakeasy gained the band its first chart position, debuting at number 44 on the Billboard Top Heatseekers Chart and number 35 on the Top Contemporary Christian Chart. This was the band's last studio album on Tooth & Nail. The label released a collection of songs from the band's first three albums on Collective and the band released Split/EP with Denison Marrs on famed indie label Velvet Blue Music. In support of the album, the band toured for nearly two years and grew immensely tired of being on the road.

Neil Samoy joined the band before the recording of its fourth studio album, (stāvz'ā'kər). The new album was released on October 1, 2002, through Nitro Records. Allmusic reviewer Bradley Torreano gave the album a four out of five stars stating "First, they've managed to balance the mix of guitar and vocals perfectly, with Mark Salomon's dark moan carrying beautifully over the fuzz-drenched guitars" and CCM magazine said "With the release of its self-titled Nitro Records debut, Stavesacre finally delivers on the potential greatness it has often hinted at through three Tooth & Nail releases and a few EPs." Even though the album received favorable reviews, the band was not happy with the final product. In December 2003, Samoy left the band for personal reasons.

In 2005, they released the Bull Takes Fighter EP, and the following year released its fifth studio album, How to Live with a Curse, through Abacus Recordings, an imprint of Century Media Records. Praising the lyrical themes on the album, Andrew Shaw stated "the overall feel of the disc was straightforward and truthful, something that there is all too little of in the industry."

The band announced in February 2007 that they would be disbanding following the recording of several new songs with original guitarist Bellew and the release of a DVD documenting the band's history. However, Lemmenes announced on March 17, 2008, that the band was unsure if they would be disbanding or not and that West was working on the DVD while a few songs had already been recorded with Bellew. They recorded a new EP, Against the Silence, marking the first songs recorded with Bellew since Speakeasy in 1999. Against the Silence was released on July 14, 2009.

They released MCMXCV on September 1, 2017. The album was originally titled Stavesacre VI.

In September 2021 the band played a set at Furnace Fest in Birmingham, Alabama.

== Members ==
Current

- Mark Salomon - vocals (1995–2009, 2014–present) (also performed in The Crucified, Neon Horse, Argyle Park, Outer Circle, etc.)
- Jeff Bellew - guitars, backing vocals (1995–1999, 2007–2009, 2014–present) (also performed in The Crucified, CHATTERbOx, Argyle Park)
- Dirk Lemmenes - bass guitar, backing vocals (1995–2009, 2014–present) (also performed in Focused)
- Sam West - drums, percussion (1997–2009, 2014–present) (also performed in Scaterd Few, The Violet Burning, Saviour Machine)
- Ryan Dennee - guitar, backing vocals (1999–2009, 2014–present)

Former

- Jeremy Moffett - drums (1995–1996) (also performed in The Blamed, Deliverance)
- Neil Samoy - guitars (1999–2003) (also performed in Flowers for June)

Timeline

== Discography ==
=== Studio albums ===
Year	Album details	Peak chart positions	
Year	Album details	Heatseekers	Christian cont.
1996	Friction: Released: June 7, 1996; Label: Tooth & Nail; Format: CD, cassette	—	—
1997	Absolutes: Released: November 4, 1997; Label: Tooth & Nail; Format: CD, cassette	—	—
1999	Speakeasy: Released: November 16, 1999; Label: Tooth & Nail; Format: CD, cassette	44	35
2002	(stāvz'ā'kər): Released: October 1, 2002; Label: Nitro; Format: CD	—	—
2006	How to Live with a Curse: Released: April 18, 2006; Label: Abacus; Format: CD	—	—
2017	MCMXCV: Released: August 2017; Label: Independent; Format: CD	—	—

=== Other albums ===
Year	Title	Label	Notes
2001	Split/EP	Velvet Blue Music	Split EP with Denison Marrs.
2001	Collective	Tooth & Nail	Compilation album
2002	Live from Deep Ellum	XS	EP
2004	Bull Takes Fighter	Independent	EP, limited to 1,000 copies
2009	Against the Silence	Independent	EP

=== Videos ===
Year	Title	Label
2005	Live from Dallas	Zambooie
