= Jyro Xhan =

Filipino American musician

Jyro Xhan is the stage/pen name of Filipino American musician GD La Villa. He lives in California. He is a singer, songwriter, producer, guitarist and keyboard player. He has been in several bands such as Jyradelix, Cush, Juggernautz, but most notably Mortal and Fold Zandura. He was the main songwriter and lead singer for both bands. He first used his pen name in 1988 on a demo tape but spelled it "Gyro" until the release of Fathom where it became Jyro.

In 1988 he, Jerome Fontamillas, Ray Tongpo and Wilson Peralta released a six-song demo called Wish Fifteen as Mortal Wish. Four years later they signed with Intense Records and released Lusis and changed their name to simply Mortal. They released six albums with Intense Records. Their last album with the label was called Pura. According to the liner notes of Pura, Solamente is inspired by Tonight I Can Write by Pablo Neruda and is cited as Jyro's favorite poet. Serena by Fold Zandura also references this poem. In the summer of 1995 he and his friend Jerome formed Fold Zandura with drummer Frank Lenz. They released three more albums until 1999. Fold Zandura has not officially broken up according to their website, but they have not released anything since King Planet.

In 2000 he worked with Crystal Lewis on Fearless and co-wrote Satisfied. In early 2002 he released a side project on Crystal Lewis' record label Metro One Music called Juggernautz without Jerome. In October 2002 Jyro released a new Mortal album on Tooth & Nail Records called Nu-En-Jin. They did not tour to promote however since Jyro has stated that Mortal could continue to exist albeit only as a studio band. He is currently working for Metro One Music as a producer, engineer, keyboard and guitar player for various bands.

Jyro is currently "director/dj/guru" in Immersion a musical collective that meets every month for event style art.

Jyro has also surfaced as the leader of the band LCNA (formerly Lucena) under the initials JFM. Their debut, Mercury Light, is available through iTunes and the band is at work on a full-length album. LCNA announced on their Myspace site that they broke up on December 30, 2009, but would reform under a different name in the near future.

July 2022 Jyro and Jermome Fontamillas announced the formation of a new band. Combining Mortal and Fold Zandura and calling it MorZan.

== Discography – major releases ==
LCNA (Lucena) Vocals, Guitar

- Mercury Light EP (2007) Ten Ten

Juggernautz Vocals, Guitar, Programming

- Juggernautz (2002) Metro 1 Music

Fold Zandura Vocals, Guitar, Programming

- Fold Zandura (1995) Xhan Records
- Return (1997) Sub•Lime Records
- The White 7" (1997) Velvet Blue Music
- Ultraforever (1997) BEC Recordings
- King Planet (1999) Nowhere Music

Mortal Vocals, Guitar, Programming

- 1992: Lusis (Intense Records, Reviews: Cross Rhythms, CCM Magazine)
- 1993: Fathom (Intense Records, Review: Cross Rhythms)
- 1993: Intense Live Series Vol. 5 (Intense Records)
- 1994: Wake (Intense Records, Cross Rhythms, CCM Magazine)
- 1995: Pura (Intense Records, Review: Cross Rhythms)
- 1996: Mortal (5 Minute Walk, Reviews: The Lighthouse, CCM Magazine)
- 1998: Godspeed (KMG Records, compilation, Review: HM Magazine)
- 2002: Nu-En-Jin (Tooth & Nail Records, Reviews: Cross Rhythms, The Phantom Tollbooth, Allmusic, HM Magazine)

Mortal Wish Vocals, Guitar, Programming

- Wish Fifteen (1988) Blue Genius

Jyradelix

- Invincible (1992) Myx
