= Celldweller discography =

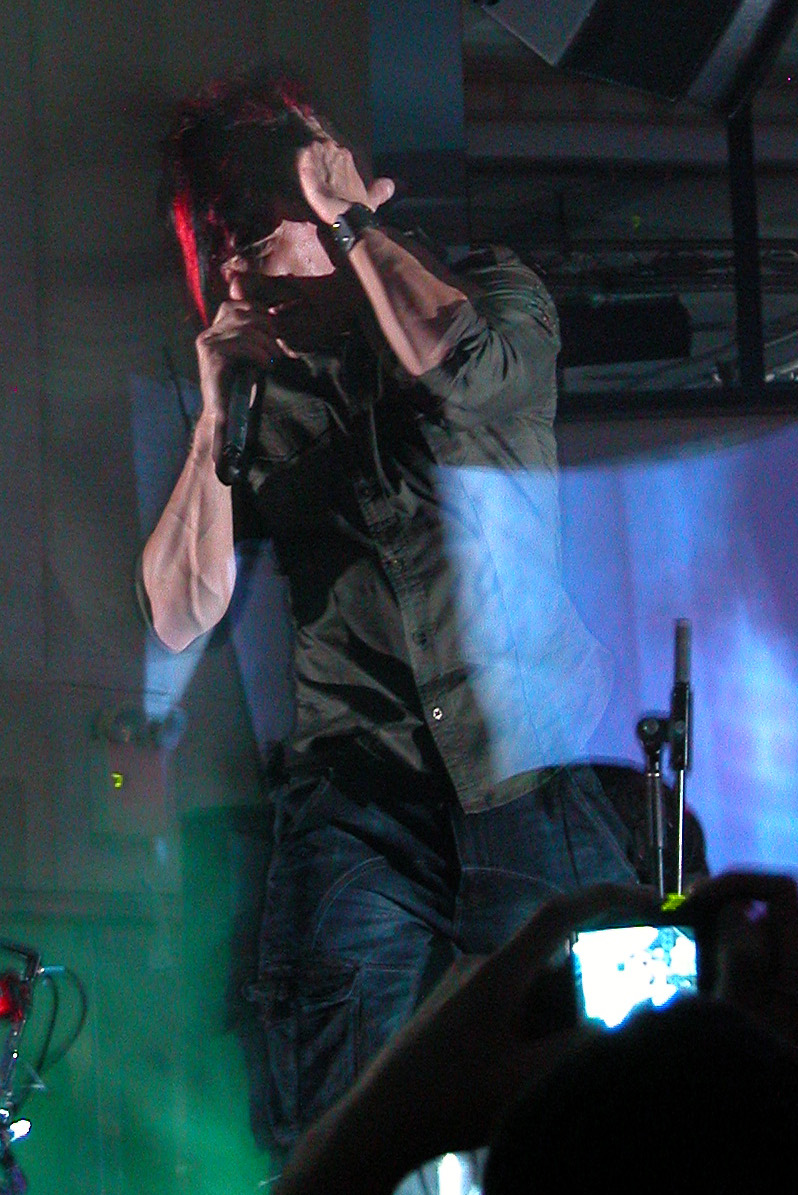
- Klayton / Celldweller in 2010
- Studio albums: 8
- Extended plays: 11
- Live albums: 1
- Compilation albums: 6
- Singles: 16
- Music videos: 8
- Remix albums: 22
- Remixes: 12
- Collaborations: 11
- Scores: 1
- Other material: 12
- DJ Mixes: 4

This is the discography of Celldweller, an American electronic rock project created by multi-instrumentalist artist Klayton.

Celldweller often releases his primary studio albums in chapters/parts over a period of time. Wish Upon a Blackstar was released after 5 chapters, Soundtrack for the Voices in My Head Vol. 2 was released in 3 chapters and the latest releases Soundtrack for the Voices in My Head Vol. 03 and the Blackstar score are both currently on their first chapters.

Celldweller has also hosted numerous remix competitions on the FiXT website.

== Albums ==
=== Studio albums ===
Title	Album details	Peak chart positions		
Title	Album details	US Dance	US Heat.	US Indie.
Celldweller	Released: February 11, 2003; Label: Position, Esion, FiXT; Format: CD, digital download, LP	—	—	—
Soundtrack for the Voices in My Head Vol. 01	Released: December 16, 2008; Label: FiXT; Format: CD, digital download, LP	—	—	—
Wish Upon a Blackstar	Released: June 12, 2012; Label: FiXT; Format: CD, digital download, LP	19	23	—
Soundtrack for the Voices in My Head Vol. 2	Released: July 24, 2012; Label: FiXT; Format: CD, digital download	—	—	—
End of an Empire	Released: November 6, 2015; Label: FiXT; Format: CD, digital download, LP	11	— (Note: While the final release of End of an Empire did not chart, Chapter 01: Time peaked at #32.)	—
Soundtrack for the Voices in My Head Vol. 03	Released: September 2, 2016; Label: FiXT; Format: CD, digital download	—	—	—
Offworld	Released: July 28, 2017; Label: FiXT; Format: CD, digital download, LP	—	17	35
Satellites	Released: October 14, 2022; Label: FiXT; Format: CD, digital download, LP	—	—	—
God Mode	Released: TBA; Label: FiXT; Format: TBA	—	—	—

=== Scores ===
Title	Album details
Blackstar	Released: September 18, 2015 December 3, 2013 (Act One: Purified) June 3, 2014 (Act Two: Awakening) September 18, 2015 (Act Three); Label: FiXT Music; Format: CD, music download

=== Remix albums ===
Title	Album details
Tragedy Remixes	Released: April 18, 2006; Label: FiXT Music; Format: Music download
Symbiont Remixes	Released: January 1, 2007; Label: FiXT Music; Format: Music download
Take It & Break It Vol. 1 - Own Little World Remixes	Released: January 1, 2007; Label: FiXT Music; Format: CD, music download
Take It & Break It Vol. 2 - Frozen Remixes	Released: May 1, 2007; Label: FiXT Music; Format: CD, music download
Take It & Break It Vol. 3 - Switchback Remixes	Released: February 21, 2008; Label: FiXT Music; Format: CD, music download
Afraid This Time Remixes	Released: June 2, 2009; Label: FiXT Music; Format: Music download
The Last Firstborn Remixes	Released: June 2, 2009; Label: FiXT Music; Format: Music download
I Believe You Remixes	Released: June 14, 2009; Label: FiXT Music; Format: Music download
Under My Feet Remixes	Released: June 14, 2009; Label: FiXT Music; Format: Music download
Fadeaway Remixes	Released: June 15, 2009; Label: FiXT Music; Format: Music download
Welcome to the End Remixes	Released: June 15, 2009; Label: FiXT Music; Format: Music download
Louder Than Words Remixes	Released: April 5, 2011; Label: FiXT Music; Format: Music download
So Long Sentiment Remixes	Released: October 26, 2011; Label: FiXT Music; Format: Music download
Eon Remixes	Released: December 13, 2011; Label: FiXT Music; Format: Music download
The Complete Cellout Vol. 1	Released: December 16, 2011; Label: FiXT Music; Format: CD, music download
I Can't Wait Remixes	Released: January 31, 2012; Label: FiXT Music; Format: Music download
The Best It's Gonna Get Remixes	Released: February 21, 2012; Label: FiXT Music; Format: Music download
Gift For You / The Lucky One / Tainted Remixes	Released: May 6, 2014; Label: FiXT Music; Format: Music download
End of an Empire: The Remixes	Released: December 4, 2015; Label: FiXT Music; Format: Music download
End of an Empire: The Remixes (Instrumentals)	Released: December 4, 2015; Label: FiXT Music; Format: Music download
Space & Time (Expansion)	Released: April 8, 2016; Label: FiXT Music; Format: Music download
End of an Empire Remix Contest Compilation	Released: July 22, 2016; Label: FiXT Music; Format: Music download

=== Live albums ===
Title	Album details
Live Upon a Blackstar	Released: March 26, 2012; Label: FiXT Music; Format: DVD, CD, music download

=== Compilation albums ===
Title	Album details
The Beta Cessions	Released: September 2004; Label: Position/Esion Media; Format: CD, music download
Demo Vault Vol. 01	Released: May 30, 2014; Label: FiXT Music; Format: Music download
Demo Vault Vol. 02	Released: September 5, 2014; Label: FiXT Music; Format: Music download
Transmissions: Vol. 01	Released: December 23, 2014; Label: FiXT Music; Format: Music download
Transmissions: Vol. 02	Released: May 8, 2015; Label: FiXT Music; Format: Music download
Transmissions: Vol. 03	Released: May 6, 2016; Label: FiXT Music; Format: Music download
Transmissions: Vol. 04	Released: August 18, 2017; Label: FiXT Music; Format: Music download
Demo Vault: Wasteland	Released: March 5, 2021; Label: FiXT Music; Format: Music download

== Extended plays ==
Title	Album details	Peak chart positions
Title	Album details	US Dance
Celldweller EP	Released: February 2000; Label: Esion; Format: Music download	—
Frozen / Goodbye Remixes EP	Released: September 9, 2005; Label: FiXT; Format: Music download	—
Switchback / Own Little World Remix EP	Released: October 23, 2006; Label: FiXT; Format: Music download	—
Symbiont Remixes EP	Released: January 1, 2007; Label: FiXT; Format: Music download	—
Cellout EP 01	Released: January 25, 2011; Label: FiXT; Format: Music download	—
Groupees Unreleased EP	Released: May 4, 2011; Label: FiXT; Format: Music download	—
Beta Cessions (Demos Vol. 01)	Released: December 23, 2011; Label: FiXT; Format: Music download	—
Groupees Charity Fundraiser	Released: November 14, 2012; Label: FiXT; Format: Music download	—
Space & Time	Released: December 11, 2012; Label: FiXT; Format: Music download	—
Zombie Killer	Released: November 22, 2013; Label: FiXT; Format: Music download	—
Killer Instinct Season 3 Soundtrack (with Atlas Plug)	Released: October 25, 2016; Label: FiXT; Format: Music download	22
Growling Machines Remixes	Released: September 29, 2017; Label: FiXT; Format: Music download	—
Weapons of War	Released: March 9, 2018; Label: FiXT; Format: Music download	—
"—" denotes a recording that did not chart or was not released in that territory.

== Singles ==
Title	Year	Album
"Switchback"	2004	Celldweller
"Shapeshifter"	2005	Need for Speed: Most Wanted
"Tragedy"	2006	Non-album single
"Kill the Sound"	2010	Dead Rising 2 Soundtrack
"Goodbye (Klayton's 2012 Mix)"	2011	The Complete Cellout Vol. 1
"Elara"	2012	Soundtrack for the Voices in My Head Vol. 02
"Unshakeable"	2012	Wish Upon a Blackstar
"Louder Than Words"	2012	Wish Upon a Blackstar
"First Person Shooter"	2012	Soundtrack for the Voices in My Head Vol. 02
"Tough Guy"	2012	Non-album single
"Younger (feat. Kenzie)"	2013	Non-album single
"Unshakeable (BT & Seamless Remix)"	2013	Non-album single
"End of an Empire"	2014	End of an Empire
"Down to Earth"	2014	End of an Empire
"Good L_ck (Yo_'re F_cked)"	2015	End of an Empire
"The Imperial March"	2015	Non-album single
"Electric Eye"	2017	Non-album single
"The Great Divide"	2017	Offworld
"My Disintegration"	2019	Satellites
"A Matter of Time"	2019	Satellites
"Into the Void"	2019	Satellites
"Baptized In Fire"	2020	Satellites
"Fakebreaker (with SWARM feat. REEBZ)"	2025	God Mode

== Remixes ==
Title	Year	Album	Original artist
"Mindfreak" (Celldweller Remix)	2005	Mindfreak: The Soundtrack	Criss Angel
"Home" (Celldweller Remix)	2007	Home - EP	LVL
"Propane Nightmares" (Celldweller Remix)	2008	Propane Nightmares - EP	Pendulum
"Suddenly" (Celldweller Remix)	2010	Suddenly (Remixes)	BT
"It's Too Late" (Celldweller Remix)	2011	It's Too Late - EP	JES
"Live The Life" (Celldweller Remix)	2011	Live The Life - EP	J. Scott G. & Adam Lambert
"A Lesson Never Learned" (Celldweller Remix)	2011	Stepped Up and Scratched	Asking Alexandria
"Creatures" ("Beast" Remix by Celldweller)	2012	Creatures (Deluxe Edition)	Motionless in White
"Creatures" ("Beauty" Remix by Celldweller)	2012	Creatures (Deluxe Edition)	Motionless in White
"Filth Friends Unite" (Celldweller Remix)	2013	Renegades Forever	I See Stars
"A-M-E-R-I-C-A" (Celldweller Remix)	2013	Infamous (Deluxe Edition)	Motionless In White
"Takedown" (Celldweller Remix)	2015	Resonance Theory Deluxe Edition	Tom Player

=== Collaborations ===
Title	Year	Album	Main artist
"Mindfreak" (Theme song for Criss Angel's Mindfreak)	2005	Mindfreak: The Soundtrack	Criss Angel
"Cold" (feat. Klayton of Celldweller)	2007	Come On!	Fluffy Starr
"Erasus" (feat. Klayton of Celldweller)	2007	Erasus - Single	Subkulture
"Idiot" (feat. Klayton of Celldweller)	2010	Voltage Controlled Body Music	Squarehead
"Fire" (feat. Klayton of Celldweller)	2011	oveRtakerS SPIRIT	M.O.V.E.
"Meteorite" (feat. Klayton of Celldweller)	2012	Meteorite - Single	Tommy Noble
"Infernal" (feat. Celldweller)	2013	Infernal EP	OCTiV
"Black Sun"	2013	Veiled Nation	James Dooley
"Rise from the Underworld"	2013	Veiled Nation	James Dooley
"Deathblow" (feat. Celldweller)	2014	Momentum EP	SeamlessR
"New Age" (feat. Celldweller)	2018	The Cascade EP	MUZZ

=== DJ Mixes ===
Title	Details
"Fixtape"	Released: March 1, 2010; Format: Digital Download; Label: FiXT Music
"Nocturnal 251 Celldweller Guest Mix"	Released: May 29, 2010; Format: Digital Download; Label: FiXT Music
"Cellout Winter Mix 2012"	Released: March 13, 2013; Format: Digital Download; Label: FiXT Music
"Fall 2013 DJ Mix"	Released: September 20, 2013; Format: Digital Download; Label: FiXT Music

=== Other material ===
Title	Year	Album
"Guess Who's Switchback (Eminem vs. Celldweller) [Klash-Up]"	2005	SoundCloud release
"Goodbye/We Will Rock You (Cellmate Mix)"	2009	The Beta Cessions: Klog Edition
"Klash-Up (Cinco de Mayo 2009 - Cellmate Mix)"	2009	The Beta Cessions: Klash-Up
"Distants (Cellmate Gift)"	2009	The Beta Cessions: Klog Edition
"Fadeaway Demo"	2009	The Beta Cessions: Klog Edition
"We Will Rock You/Goodbye (Klash-Up Mix)"	2010	The Beta Cessions: Klog Edition
"Mother's Arms (Merry Christmas Cellmates)"	2010	The Beta Cessions: Klog Edition
"Disposable War Pigs (Celldweller Klash-Up)"	2011	The Beta Cessions: Klash-Up
"Celldweller's Soundtrack to Your Year 2012"	2011	Free download
"Miss Murder's Personal Jesus (Celldweller Klash-Up)"	2012	Free download
"Cry Little Sister vs. Hello Zepp (Celldweller Klash-Up)"	2012	Free download
"Snowcore"	2014	Free download

=== Unreleased tracks ===
This section refers to any material not yet released as full, studio-quality tracks.

Title	Details
"Through the Gates (Untitled 2012 Remix)"	Appears on Live Upon a Blackstar
"Symbiont (Untitled 2012 Remix)"	Appears on Live Upon a Blackstar
"Louder Than Words (Klayton's 1984 Remix)"	Appears on Live Upon a Blackstar
"Ursa Minor (Untitled 2012 Remix)"	Appears on Live Upon a Blackstar
"Fadeaway (Untitled 2012 Remix)"	Appears on Live Upon a Blackstar
"So Long Sentiment Vs. Eon"	Appears on Live Upon a Blackstar
"Switchback (Untitled 2012 Remix)"	Appears on Live Upon a Blackstar and Fall 2013 DJ Mix
"I Believe You Vs. The Best It's Gonna Get"	Appears on Live Upon a Blackstar
"Tainted vs. T-200"	Mashup of Celldweller and Metrik; Appears on Fall 2013 DJ Mix
"So Long Genesis"	Mashup of Celldweller and Metrik; Appears on Fall 2013 DJ Mix

== Music videos ==
Title	Year	Album	Director	Type	Link
"Switchback"	2003	Celldweller	Klayton	Narrative	
"Own Little World (Klayton's We Will Never Die Mix)"	2011	Cellout EP 01	Chuck Wheeler	Tour footage	
"Frozen (Celldweller vs. Blue Stahli)"	2011	Cellout EP 01	Klayton	Performance	
"Unshakeable"	2013	Wish Upon a Blackstar	Josh Viola	Narrative	
"Lost in Time"	2015	End of an Empire	Animattronic	Narrative	
"Down to Earth"	2015	End of an Empire	Michi Lange	Narrative	
"How Little I Must Know"	2017	Offworld	Klayton	Narrative	
"Echoes"	2017	Offworld	Kyle Danley	Narrative	
