= Soundtrack for the Voices in My Head Vol. 03 =

Album by Celldweller

Soundtrack for the Voices in My Head: Vol. 03

Studio album by Celldweller
- Released: July 2, 2013 (Chapter 01); September 2, 2016 (Full album)
- Genre: Electronic rock; experimental rock; instrumental rock; industrial rock
- Length: 46:00 (Full album); 9:19 (Chapter 01)
- Label: FiXT Music
- Producer: Klayton

Celldweller chronology
Celldweller 10th Anniversary Re-Issue (2013)	Soundtrack for the Voices in My Head: Vol. 03 (2013)	End of an Empire (2015)

Soundtrack for the Voices in My Head: Vol. 03 is the third production-based and sixth overall studio album by the American electronic rock artist, Celldweller. It is the third album in the Soundtrack for the Voices in My Head series.

== Production ==
Like Wish Upon a Blackstar and Soundtrack for the Voices in My Head Vol. 02, SVH Vol. 03 was released in Chapters.

It was hinted already in February 2013, but it was formally announced on Klayton's Facebook page on May 9, 2013. The album was revealed in an advertisement placed by Position Music at The Golden Trailer Awards. The first song that Klayton mentioned from the album was "Down to Earth", but it is not included on Chapter 01, but rather in Chapter 2 of End of an Empire.

== Release ==
=== Chapter 01 ===
Information about Chapter 01 was first posted on The Orchard. Alongside the cover art, it was revealed by the website that the first Chapter will include four tracks and will be released on July 16, 2013. On June 26, 2013, Klayton announced that the first Chapter of the album would be released earlier, on July 2, 2013, exclusively on iTunes, while it would be released on the previous release date on other online stores, including FiXT Store. The FiXT Store release includes two alternate song versions and a Limited Edition CD of 150 hand numbered copies.

== Track listing ==
No.	Title	Length
1.	"Mission to Mercury"	2:08
2.	"Razorface"	3:14
3.	"Hyperion"	2:26
4.	"Battlecry"	1:24
5.	"Jupiter"	2:14
6.	"The Landing (Faction 1)"	1:30
7.	"Callisto (Faction 2)"	2:05
8.	"Time Is Lost (Faction 3)"	2:32
9.	"Scan of Helion (Faction 4)"	0:40
10.	"Fall to Earth (Faction 5)"	2:02
11.	"The Expanse (Faction 6)"	2:33
12.	"Dreamcatcher (Faction 7)"	0:30
13.	"Glyph (Faction 8)"	2:09
14.	"Distant Worlds (Faction 9)"	3:20
15.	"Gatekeeper (Faction 10)"	0:43
16.	"The Chosen Ones (Faction 11)"	3:33
17.	"Your Life Has Only Just Begun (Faction 12)"	3:04
18.	"Terra Firma (Faction 13)"	1:55
19.	"Prison Break (Faction 14)"	2:34
20.	"When Your Walls Fall (Faction 15)"	5:08
Total length:		46:00

Chapter 01
No.	Title	Length
1.	"Razorface"	3:14
2.	"Hyperion"	2:26
3.	"Battlecry"	1:24
4.	"Jupiter"	2:14
Total length:		9:19

FiXT Store Exclusive
No.	Title	Length
5.	"Razorface (No Orchestra)"	3:14
6.	"Jupiter (No Choir)"	2:14
Total length:		14:48
