= Offworld (album) =

Studio album by Celldweller
- Released: July 28, 2017
- Recorded: 2017
- Genre: Electronic rock; alternative rock; industrial rock; shoegaze; dream pop
- Length: 52:56
- Label: FiXT Music
- Producer: Klayton

Celldweller chronology
End of an Empire (2015)	Offworld (2017)	Satellites (2022)

Singles from Offworld
- 1. "The Great Divide" Released: June 29, 2017

Professional ratings
Review scores
Source	Rating
PureGrain Audio	8.5/10 stars
ReGen Magazine	(favorable)

Offworld is the fourth vocal studio album (Seventh overall) by electronic rock project Celldweller, released on July 28, 2017. A change of style for Celldweller, the album focuses on emotional songwriting, marking a departure from the aggressive metal and electronic style found in his previous albums.

== Production and release ==
In January 2017, Klayton announced on Instagram that he was working on a new album (originally titled Offworld: Vol. 01), and posting a short snippet of music. On March 27, Klayton tweeted that the new album was finished, which marks the shortest production time of any major Celldweller release.

The first song from the album, "The Great Divide" was released on June 29, and shortly after that, a cover of The Call's "Too Many Tears". The album was finally released on July 28, 2017, including five original songs, as well as remixes and covers from Klayton's various projects, all reworked to fit the style of the album.

== Style ==
Talking about the inspiration for the album, Klayton stated:

"Winter. At its heart, winter is the season I find myself gravitating towards listening to more emotive & melancholy music. One winters night I found myself in my studio, lights dimmed low, playing with a guitar and a new piece of software. I started plucking out the notes that would eventually become "How Little I Must Know." Lyrics and vocals came together quickly and I soon had a short song finished, but wasn't quite sure where it fit. Thus begun the development of the idea to make a whole album that had a specific feel, and for me captured the essence of the music I loved to listen to during earth's perihelion."

== Reception ==
Mike Bax of PureGrain Audio gave the album a positive review with a rating of 8.5 out of 10, saying: "If there is such a thing as singer/songwriter exploration within the genre of electronic EDM music - Offworld is a prime example of how to do it successfully."

== Track listing ==
No.	Title	Length
1.	"Offworld"	5:02
2.	"How Little I Must Know"	2:23
3.	"The Great Divide"	5:17
4.	"Too Many Tears" (The Call cover)	6:22
5.	"Awakening with You" (Scandroid cover)	5:06
6.	"Mother's Arms"	1:11
7.	"Into the Fall" (Circle of Dust cover, mashing up "Malacandra" and "Embracing Entropy")	4:30
8.	"Echoes"	6:25
9.	"Last Night on Earth"	6:02
10.	"Own Little World (Offworld Reprise)"	5:09
11.	"Awakening With You (Ulrich Schnauss Remix)"	5:15
Total length:		52:56

== Charts ==
Chart (2017)	Peak position
US Heatseekers Albums (Billboard)	17
US Independent Albums (Billboard)	35
