= SVH =

SVH may refer to

Health

- Stormont Vail Health, a medical facility in Kansas, USA
- Simi Valley Hospital, a Seventh-day adventist hospital in California
- St. Vincent's Hospital (disambiguation), various hospitals

Schools

- Scotts Valley High School, a high school in Scotts Valley, California
- Springvale House, a prep school in Mashonaland East, Zimbabwe

Sports

- SV Heidingsfeld, a football club in Bavaria, Germany
- SV Honselersdijk, a football club in Honselersdijk, Netherlands

Other meanings

- Sweet Valley High, a novel series by Francine Pascal
- Soundtrack for the Voices in My Head, a series of albums by Celldweller
- State Veterans Home, a State established home, approved by the Department of Veterans Affairs
- Spectral variability hypothesis, an ecological theory related to plant species richness
