= Soundtrack for the Voices in My Head =

Soundtrack for the Voices in My Head may refer to three albums by electronic rock band Celldweller:

- Soundtrack for the Voices in My Head Vol. 01, 2008
- Soundtrack for the Voices in My Head Vol. 02, 2010–2012
- Soundtrack for the Voices in My Head Vol. 03, 2016
