= Voices in My Head =

Voices in My Head or Voice in My Head may refer to:

- Voices in My Head (album), a 2013 album by Dot Rotten
- Voice in My Head, a 2005 album by Leo Sayer
- Voices in My Head (EP), by Riverside, 2005
- "Voices in My Head" (Ashley Tisdale song), 2018
- "Voices in My Head" (Falling in Reverse song), 2022
- "Voices in My Head", a song by Bob Mould from the 2016 album Patch the Sky
- "Voice in My Head", a song by Amy Lee from the 2014 soundtrack Aftermath
- "Voice in My Head", a song by Alessia Cara from her 2021 album In the Meantime
- "Voices in My Head", the finale of the musical Be More Chill
- The Voice in My Head, a stand-up comedy act by Christopher Titus
- Voices in My Head, a 2006 documentary by David Malone

== See also ==
- Auditory hallucination, a form of hallucination that involves perceiving sounds without auditory stimulus
- Soundtrack for the Voices in My Head (disambiguation)
