= Celldweller (EP) =

Celldweller EP

EP by Celldweller
- Released: February 2000
- Recorded: 1998–1999
- Genre: Electronic rock, industrial metal, electro-industrial, trance
- Length: 24:30
- Label: Esion Media
- Producer: Klayton; Grant Mohrman

Celldweller chronology
Celldweller EP (2000)	Celldweller (2003)

Celldweller is the self-titled debut extended play (EP) by the electronic rock project Celldweller. Only 250 copies were made and sold out quickly. The first three tracks are credited to Celldweller and were re-recorded for the debut full-length album that was released four years later; the fourth and fifth tracks were credited simply to Klayton and later appeared on The Beta Cessions Vol. 1.

== Track listing ==
No.	Title	Length
1.	"Symbiont"	4:56
2.	"Own Little World"	3:33
3.	"Fadeaway"	4:47
4.	"Beginning of the End"	5:54
5.	"Kemikal"	5:29
Total length:		24:30

== Additional personnel ==
- Ben Grosse – Mixing
- Richard Hunt – Editing
- Kennedy James – Drums
- Grant Mohrman – Acoustic guitar, producer, engineer, mixing
- Jarrod Montague – Drums
- Erik Wolf – Mastering
