= Groupees Unreleased EP =

EP by Celldweller
- Released: May 4, 2011
- Recorded: 2004–2011
- Genre: Electronic rock, industrial metal, drum and bass, electronica
- Length: 28:29 (with bonus tracks)
- Label: FiXT Music
- Producer: Klayton; Grant Mohrman

Celldweller chronology
Cellout EP 01 (2011)	Groupees Unreleased EP (2011)	The Complete Cellout (2011)

Groupees Unreleased EP is an extended play by the American electronic rock project, Celldweller. On May 2, 2011, Klayton announced a 72 Hour Exclusive 4EP Bundle Sale on Groupees with 20% of the benefits going to Red Cross for Tornado Relief. The bundle included the Unreleased EP, which contained previously unreleased tracks and remixes, including a song from the then unreleased Soundtrack for the Voices in My Head Vol. 2 Chapter 02 and a previously unreleased Beta Cessions demo. If the goal of $10,000 reached within the duration of the promotion, two more tracks would be unlocked for every donor. This goal was later decreased to $6,000 and was reached. The top donor was rewarded with a bonus unreleased track which is exclusively his/her until its official release. The EP was only available for 72 hours, from May 4 to May 7, therefore it is no longer available.

== Track listing ==
No.	Title	Length
1.	"So Long Sentiment (Metal Revision by Paul Udarov)"	5:31
2.	"Eon (Drop RMX)"	4:08
3.	"Senorita Bonita"	0:59
4.	"Louder Than Words (DNA Remix)"	6:46
5.	"Shapeshifter (Klayton Revision)"	2:58

=== Bonus tracks ===
No.	Title	Length
6.	"Atmospheric Light (Unreleased Beta Cessions demo)"	3:14
7.	"The Lucky One (Voicians Remix)"	4:49
