= Switchback (Celldweller song) =

Single by Celldweller

from the album Celldweller
- Released: 2004
- Recorded: 2003
- Genre: Industrial metal; nu metal; electronic rock
- Length: 5:02
- Label: Position; FiXT
- Songwriter: Klayton
- Producer: Klayton

Celldweller singles chronology
| "I Believe You" (2003) | "Switchback" (2004) | "Shapeshifter" (2005) |

"Switchback" is a song by the American electronic rock project Celldweller, released in 2003 on the self-titled debut album. Like other Celldweller tracks, "Switchback" has been licensed for media usage.

== Overview ==
=== Background ===
Klayton has described "Switchback" as the "most expensive song I've ever shelved", having recorded more than 50 demos for three years. $11,500 was spent on recording and mixing an early version (dubbed the "Detroit 2000" mix on The Beta Cessions release) which eventually got scrapped. Switchback was the last track to be recorded and mixed for the album.

=== Music video ===
The music video was produced, edited and directed by Klayton himself and was shot on location at The High Street House. Klayton had described the "Gray Girl" as his "mirror image", stating, "she was like an alter ego or a version of me in a perverted form". A majority of the footage that was shot did not "translate" into the vision Klayton had and as a result, the original storyline for the video was scrapped and became something that Klayton "did not want", having described the video as, "a bunch of guys in a room lip syncing to the music".

== Track listing ==
UK promo single

Side A
| No. | Title | Length |
|---|---|---|
| 1. | "Switchback" (Filo and Peri Remix) | 5:52 |

Side B
| No. | Title | Length |
|---|---|---|
| 1. | "Switchback" (Elevation Thomas Dub) | 9:10 |

Switchback/Own Little World Remix EP

| No. | Title | Length |
|---|---|---|
| 1. | "Switchback" (Klayton Revision) | 6:48 |
| 2. | "Own Little World" (Remorse Code and Blue Stahli Remix) | 6:30 |
| 3. | "Switchback" (Klayton Revision instrumental) | 6:48 |
| 4. | "Own Little World" (Remorse Code and Blue Stahli Remix instrumental) | 6:30 |

== Media usage ==
"Switchback" is the most used Celldweller track to be used for various media, including:

- Halloween: Resurrection
- Spider-Man 2
- Doom
- Catwoman
- The Punisher
- Paycheck
- CSI
- xXx: State of the Union
- National Security
- Bad Boys 2
- Out for a Kill
- Bring It On Again
- Kart Racer
- Project Gotham Racing 3
- Enter The Matrix
- One Tree Hill
- America's Next Top Model
- Punk'd
- Dawson's Creek
- Roswell
- Access Hollywood
- Dead Rising 2, used in the boss battle against psychopath characters Reed and Roger.
- Pump It Up Pro 2
- Death Race 2
- Jaegarn 5 - Enemy of the State
- KickBeat
- World Extreme Cagefighting
- Grand Theft Auto VI
