= Cellout EP 01 =

EP by Celldweller
- Released: January 25, 2011; February 8, 2011 (Deluxe Edition)
- Recorded: 2008–2010
- Genre: Electronic rock, dubstep, electronica, electro, drum and bass
- Length: 15:46; 31:32 (Deluxe Edition)
- Label: FiXT Music
- Producer: Klayton; Grant Mohrman

Celldweller chronology
Soundtrack for the Voices in My Head Vol. 01 (2008)	Cellout EP 01 (2011)	Groupees Unreleased EP (2011)

Cellout EP 01 is an extended play by the American electronic rock project, Celldweller. In late 2010 Klayton announced that he is planning to release studio recordings of the live versions of Celldweller songs played on the tour. The first piece of these releases, Cellout EP 01 was released on January 25, 2011 as iTunes exclusive. On May 20, he posted the EP version of Own Little World as a free download for reaching 75,000 likes on his Facebook page.

In an episode of "Ask Celldweller", Klayton stated that he may not release any more studio versions of live mixes, believing "that represents 2010 and we're in 2014, so my mind is somewhere else".

== Track listing ==
No.	Title	Length
1.	"Own Little World (Klayton's We Will Never Die Mix)"	4:39
2.	"Frozen (Celldweller vs. Blue Stahli)"	5:02
3.	"The Best It's Gonna Get vs. Tainted"	6:05
4.	"Own Little World (Klayton's We Will Never Die Mix) (Instrumental) (Deluxe Edition only)"	4:39
5.	"Frozen (Celldweller vs. Blue Stahli) (Instrumental) (Deluxe Edition only)"	5:02
6.	"The Best It's Gonna Get vs. Tainted (Instrumental) (Deluxe Edition only)"	6:05
