= Celldweller (album) =

2003 album by Celldweller

Studio album by Celldweller
- Released: February 11, 2003
- Recorded: 2000–2002
- Genres: Electronic rock; nu metal; industrial metal
- Length: 69:47
- Labels: Position Music; Esion Media
- Producers: Klayton; Grant Mohrman

Celldweller chronology
Celldweller (2000)	Celldweller (2003)	Soundtrack for the Voices in My Head Vol. 01 (2008)

Singles from Celldweller
- 1. "I Believe You" Released: 2003; 2. "Switchback" Released: 2004

Celldweller 10 Year Anniversary Edition

Studio album (reissue) by Celldweller
- Released: June 10, 2013
- Recorded: 1999–2012
- Genres: Electronic rock; nu metal; industrial metal
- Length: 74:24; 148:10 (2-CD deluxe set)
- Label: FiXT
- Producers: Klayton; Grant Mohrman

Celldweller chronology
Soundtrack for the Voices in My Head Vol. 02 (2010-2012)	Celldweller 10 Year Anniversary Edition (2013)	Soundtrack for the Voices in My Head Vol. 03 (2013-2016)

Alternative cover
- 2-CD deluxe set cover

Professional ratings
Review scores
Source	Rating
AllMusic	3/5 stars

Celldweller (Definitive Edition)

Studio album by Celldweller
- Released: February 16, 2024
- Recorded: 1999–2023
- Genres: Electronic rock; nu metal; industrial metal
- Length: 236:56
- Label: FiXT
- Producers: Klayton; Grant Mohrman

Celldweller chronology
Satellites (2022)	Celldweller (Definitive Edition) (2024)

Celldweller is the first studio album by the American electronic rock project Celldweller, released in 2003. The album spent one week on the Billboard Top Internet Albums chart, at number 17, and was awarded Album of the Year at the Just Plain Folks Music Awards. Guest appearances include Jarrod Montague of Taproot.

The album was re-released on 10 June 2013 in celebration of the 10th anniversary of the original release. A definitive edition was released on 16 February 2024 in celebration of the 20th anniversary of the original release.

== Background ==
Klayton worked in earnest with the producer Grant Mohrman (formerly of Leaderdogs for the Blind and Full on the Mouth) on the album, which was scheduled for release in February 2001. There had been several questions about any Celldweller songs to be released. Although, Klayton was having three albums from his former band Angeldust rereleased under Criss Angel's name, he had begun working on the album. Klayton agreed with various online companies to provide unused songs for download in high quality.

Various delays kept pushing the album's release date back. During this time, Klayton kept fans up to date with numerous Celldweller logs through his website and via email and, in 2001, released raw files of the song "Symbiont" to give fans and fellow musicians a chance to remix Celldweller's music. Eight remixes were chosen and uploaded to the original Mp3.com, most of them making it to the top of the Electronic and the Electro-Industrial charts. The exposure led to over 500,000 song plays on Mp3.com. The "Symbiont" remixes became a digital EP six years later.

The album was released in early 2003 and debuted at number 17 on Billboard's Internet Sales chart. Celldweller included a guest appearance by the Taproot drummer Jarrod Montague. In 2004, the album received five awards at the Just Plain Folks Music Awards, winning Album of the Year, Producer of the Year, Industrial Album of the Year, Metal Song of the Year ("One Good Reason") and Best Industrial Rock Song ("Switchback"), and also runner-up in Best Industrial Song with "Stay with Me (Unlikely)" and Best Rock Song with "I Believe You". Prior to the album's release, "Symbiont" was used in Track Down. However, the distributor of the film was mistakenly credited as "Miramax". Later, the song "Switchback" was included in the list of Extreme Mode songs for the popular iPhone OS game Tap Tap Revenge.

=== 10 Year Anniversary Edition ===
On May 1, 2013, Klayton announced that for the 10th anniversary of the album, it would be re-issued with updated artwork and a second disc with the songs released during the Groupees promotions, remixes, rarities and unreleased songs, all remastered for this release. The unreleased song, "Uncrowned", which is an outtake from the original album and from Wish Upon a Blackstar, was finished by Klayton for this release. The song was written in 2000. The album was released a day earlier than the original release date and those who had pre-ordered the CD version of the album on FiXT, had their copies shipped and delivered a few days early. Klayton signed fifteen copies of the deluxe edition CDs which were mailed at random when the pre-orders were shipped.

=== Definitive Edition ===
On November 10, 2023, Klayton announced another edition of the album, the Definitive Edition, for the 20th anniversary of the album. The album consists of 55 tracks, the original album and bonus tracks, all remastered. The Definitive Edition was released on February 16, 2024.

== Track listing ==
All songs written by Klayton.

No.	Title	Length
1.	"Cell #1"	0:29
2.	"Switchback"	5:02
3.	"Stay With Me (Unlikely)"	3:41
4.	"The Last Firstborn"	7:41
5.	"Under My Feet"	3:30
6.	"I Believe You"	3:26
7.	"Frozen"	7:00
8.	"Symbiont"	5:27
9.	"Afraid This Time"	4:59
10.	"Fadeaway"	4:47
11.	"Cell #2"	0:21
12.	"So Sorry to Say"	5:33
13.	"Own Little World"	3:33
14.	"Unlikely (Stay With Me)"	2:59
15.	"One Good Reason"	3:53
16.	"The Stars of Orion"	2:56
17.	"Cell #3"	0:32
18.	"Welcome to the End"	4:00
Total length:		69:47

Re-issue bonus track (standard edition)
No.	Title	Length
19.	"Uncrowned"	4:27
Total length:		74:24

Re-issue second disc (deluxe edition)
No.	Title	Length
19.	"Ghosts (featuring Tom Salta)"	5:06
20.	"Uncrowned"	4:27
21.	"Tragedy (Bee Gees cover)"	3:47
22.	"Shapeshifter (featuring Styles of Beyond)"	3:37
23.	"Goodbye (Remixed by Klayton)"	7:03
24.	"The Last Firstborn (Remixed by Klayton)"	5:31
25.	"Frozen (CPR Remix By Copy Paste Repeat)"	3:31
26.	"Switchback (Remixed by Klayton)"	6:48
27.	"Atmospheric Light (Demo Redux)"	3:59
28.	"Own Little World (Remixed by Blue Stahli)"	6:26
29.	"Shapeshifter (featuring Styles of Beyond) (Remixed by Klayton)"	2:59
30.	"Goodbye"	5:25
31.	"Waiting (Unreleased Demo 2005)"	4:23
32.	"06-06-06 (Unreleased Demo 2006)"	2:59
33.	"Waiting for So Long (Unreleased Demo 2006)"	1:33
34.	"Blood From the Stone (Unreleased Demo 2005)"	3:01
35.	"IRIA (Unreleased Demo 2005)"	4:23
36.	"Switchback (Dead By Dawn Remix by No I'm Not)"	3:15
Total length:		78:13

Definitive edition
No.	Title	Length
19.	"Uncrowned"	4:26
20.	"Shapeshifter (featuring Styles of Beyond)"	3:37
21.	"Ghosts (featuring Tom Salta)"	5:06
22.	"Goodbye"	5:25
23.	"Tragedy"	3:47
24.	"Switchback (2001)"	4:35
25.	"The Way She Wants to Die (2005 Demo)"	4:48
26.	"Waiting (2005 Demo)"	4:22
27.	"06-06-06"	2:58
28.	"Switchback (2000)"	3:43
29.	"Blood From The Stone (2005 Demo)"	3:01
30.	"Atmospheric Light (Demo Redux)"	3:59
31.	"IRIA (Demo)"	4:22
32.	"Waiting For So Long"	1:32
33.	"Switchback (Klayton Remix)"	6:47
34.	"Frozen (Copy Paste Repeat Remix)"	3:33
35.	"Goodbye (Klayton's Blackstar Mix)"	4:56
36.	"Shapeshifter (Blue Stahli Remix)"	3:58
37.	"Switchback (GMS Remix)"	7:53
38.	"Switchback (Celldweller & The Browning)"	4:32
39.	"Shapeshifter (TESSERACTS Remix)"	4:52
40.	"Fadeaway (Void Chapter Remix)"	5:23
41.	"Frozen (Celldweller vs. Blue Stahli)"	4:59
42.	"Welcome to the End (Nouveau Arcade Remix)"	3:22
43.	"Stay With Me (Unlikely) (Toronto Is Broken Remix)"	3:24
44.	"Switchback (Kodeseven Remix)"	4:09
45.	"Own Little World (Klayton's We Will Never Die Mix)"	4:37
46.	"Uncrowned (Kaixo Remix)"	4:15
47.	"One Good Reason (Drumcorps Remix)"	3:50
48.	"Shapeshifter (Zardonic & Pythius Remix)"	5:04
49.	"Own Little World (Drop Remix)"	4:18
50.	"The Last Firstborn (Klayton Remix)"	5:31
51.	"Shapeshifter (Klayton Remix)"	2:58
52.	"Own Little World (Remorse Code Remix)"	6:25
53.	"Switchback (Neuroticfish Remix)"	4:09
54.	"Own Little World (Growling Machines Remix)"	7:47
55.	"Welcome to the End (Cassetter Remix)"	4:26
Total length:		236:56

== Chart positions ==
=== Album ===
Chart (2003)	Peak position
U.S. Internet Albums (Billboard)	17

== Additional personnel ==
- Ben Grosse – mixing
- Richard Hunt – editing
- Kennedy James – drums
- Grant Mohrman – acoustic guitar on "(Unlikely) Stay With Me", producer, engineer, mixing
- Jarrod Montague – drums on "I Believe You"
- Fluffy Starr – female vocals on "Frozen", "The Stars of Orion" and "Welcome to the End"
- Jennifer Neal – female vocals on "Stay With Me (Unlikely)" and "(Unlikely) Stay With Me"
- Victoria Faiella – vocals on "Cell 2", and "Cell 3"
- Erik Wolf – mastering

== Licensing ==
Every song on Celldweller has been licensed at least once for a movie, video game or another form of media with titles including Doom, Mr. and Mrs. Smith, Supercross, XXX: State of the Union, Spider-Man 2, Constantine, Catwoman, The Punisher, Paycheck, Timeline, Mindhunters, National Security, Bad Boys II, Redline, Project Gotham Racing 3, NHL 2003, Enter the Matrix, XGRA: Extreme-G Racing Association, The Hills Have Eyes 2, Crackdown, Need for Speed: Most Wanted, America's Next Top Model and Pimp My Ride. This is a feat that has been accomplished by only three other artists: Moby, Meiko, and The Crystal Method.

- "Cell #1", "Switchback" and "Welcome to the End" were used in episode 11 of the American drama television series: Dirt. "Welcome to the End" was used in episode 2 of the same series.
- The instrumental of "One Good Reason" is included on Need for Speed: Most Wanted's soundtrack. It also appears on Flint Michigan's Rock Radio Station, "Banana 101.5" during some of the commercials.
- "Afraid This Time", "The Last Firstborn", "So Sorry To Say", "Fadeaway" and "Frozen" were all used in the 2007 video game Crackdown.
- "Own Little World", "One Good Reason", "The Last Firstborn" and "The Stars of Orion" were included in the 2003 video game XGRA: Extreme-G Racing Association.
- "Switchback" is considered the most popular song Celldweller has ever released. It has been used in films, games, commercial, and other media such as Out for a Kill, Enter The Matrix, Halloween: Resurrection, Doom, Spider-Man 2, Catwoman, The Punisher, Bring It On Again, Kart Racer, Project Gotham Racing 3, NHL 2003, Tap Tap, Pump It Up PRO 2 (later brought into Pump It Up Fiesta EX) and Bad Boys 2. It has also been used in certain episodes of World Extreme Cagefighting.
- "Symbiont" has been used in Enter the Matrix, Takedown, Cutaway, Rallisport Challenge 2, Wrecked, Airbrush Alchemy, 21 and Road Rash – Jailbreak.
- "Own Little World", "Switchback" and "I Believe You" were used in the 2010 video game Dead Rising 2.
- Instrumental renditions of "Stay With Me (Unlikely)" and "The Last Firstborn" were featured in the 2004 video game Fallout: Brotherhood of Steel.
