= End of an Empire =

Studio album by Celldweller
- Released: November 6, 2015 (full album); September 16, 2014 (Time); December 5, 2014 (Love); March 13, 2015 (Dreams); July 17, 2015 (Death)
- Recorded: Late 2012 – 2015
- Genre: Electronic rock; industrial metal; alternative metal; trance; drum and bass; electronica
- Length: 74:06 (full album); 69:42 (Time); 92:32 (Love); 66:45 (Dreams); 77:10 (Death)
- Label: FiXT Music
- Producer: Klayton

Celldweller chronology
Blackstar (2014-2015)	End of an Empire (2015)	Offworld (2017)

Singles from End of an Empire
- 1. "End of an Empire" Released: September 2, 2014; 2. "Down To Earth" Released: November 26, 2014; 3. "Good L_ck (Yo_'re F_cked)" Released: February 26, 2015; 4. "New Elysium" Released: July 3, 2015

End of an Empire is the third vocal studio album (fifth overall) from electronic rock project Celldweller. It was released in "chapters", like most of Celldweller's previous works. The first of four chapters, Time, was released on September 16, 2014. The second, Love, was released on December 5, 2014. The third, Dreams, was released on March 13, 2015. The fourth and final chapter, Death, was released on July 17, 2015. The full album was released on November 6, 2015.

== Concept ==
End of an Empire is a concept album, set in the world of "Atiria". The narrative focuses on "The Emperor", who is dealing with a failing civilization, brought about by conflict between "Pro-bots" and "Robophobes". Other characters are introduced in each chapter; "Overseer", "Siren", "Dreamcatcher" and "Gatekeeper" (in that order). Other locations include "Deltar", a city within Atiria, and "Helion", home to the "XR-87 Prison System". Currently, little is known about the relationships between the characters and locations, leading to much speculation. According to Klayton, the album is not a follow-up to Wish Upon a Blackstar.

== Production and release ==
Production of the album started around late 2012, almost directly after the release of Wish Upon a Blackstar, and was formally announced in an update on February 26, 2013. In the update, Klayton stated that "Purified" had been completed and would go towards the then untitled album, though it was instead released on Blackstar Act One: Purified in December that year.

When asked in an April episode of "Ask Celldweller", he stated the upcoming album would be released in chapters, though he did not give a title or a release date, nor any insight into the album's progress.

A few months later, throughout July and August, three snippets were posted onto Klayton's Instagram, they all come from the same song, "End of an Empire", that had been previously mentioned.

Any further news on the upcoming album was sparse until August 6, when a series of images on Celldweller's Facebook page implied a new Celldweller release, this was confirmed on the 12th when one of these images, which previously contained four empty imprints, was reuploaded, containing a blue emblem representing "Time", implying the new release would be split into four chapters, each with individual titles. The new image also confirmed the name of the release as End of an Empire.

=== Chapter 01: Time ===
On August 14, the artwork and a teaser trailer were released for End of an Empire - Chapter 01: Time, pre-orders went live the same day, though no previews were released. Time consists of five tracks, including "End of an Empire", the previously unmentioned "Lost In Time", and three sound design-oriented tracks, "Factions", but also contains four remixes (of "End of an Empire" and "Lost In Time") and six instrumentals. Time was released on September 16, 2014.

The title track, "End of an Empire" was announced as the first single off the album, in another trailer released on August 27, the single was released on September 2 to those who have already pre-ordered and was premiered through Revolver magazine. The next song that was premiered was "Lost in Time" through Loudwire. Time was released on September 16, 2014.

Chapter 01: Time
No.	Title	Length
1.	"Faction 01"	1:30
2.	"End of an Empire"	7:32
3.	"Lost in Time"	7:23
4.	"Faction 02"	2:07
5.	"Faction 03" (Instrumental)	2:32
6.	"End of an Empire" (Comaduster Remix)	4:58
7.	"Lost in Time" (KJ Sawka Remix)	3:30
8.	"End of an Empire" (Breathe Carolina Remix)	3:38
9.	"Lost in Time" (OCTiV Remix)	4:43
10.	"End of an Empire" (Instrumental)	7:32
11.	"Lost in Time" (Instrumental)	7:23
12.	"End of an Empire" (Comaduster Remix (Instrumental))	4:58
13.	"Lost in Time" (KJ Sawka Remix (Instrumental))	3:30
14.	"End of an Empire" (Breathe Carolina Remix (Instrumental))	3:38
15.	"Lost in Time" (OCTiV Remix (Instrumental))	4:43
Total length:		1:09:42

=== Chapter 02: Love ===
On November 19, a distorted version of the emblem sequence was uploaded, the next day, another emblem was revealed; a red heart that represents Love.

On November 20, a teaser trailer was uploaded to Celldweller's YouTube and Facebook for Chapter 02 of End of an Empire, entitled Love. Pre-orders were made available on the FiXT store that same day, while iTunes pre-orders were available the following day. The album included three more "Faction" tracks, two songs entitled "Down to Earth" and "Heart On", a clean version of "Heart On", five remixes, and instrumentals for all but two tracks. On November 26, "Down To Earth" was released early as the second single off the album. Love was released on December 5, 2014.

Chapter 02: Love
No.	Title	Length
1.	"Faction 04"	0:40
2.	"Down to Earth"	6:56
3.	"Heart On"	6:37
4.	"Faction 05"	2:05
5.	"Faction 06"	2:33
6.	"Down to Earth" (Celldweller Remix)	6:15
7.	"Heart On" (Aesthetic Perfection Remix)	4:28
8.	"Down to Earth" (KATFYR Remix)	4:26
9.	"Heart On" (SeamlessR Remix)	4:56
10.	"Heart On" (Mister Faux Remix)	5:04
11.	"Heart On" (Clean)	6:37
12.	"Faction 04" (Instrumental)	0:40
13.	"Down to Earth" (Instrumental)	6:56
14.	"Heart On" (Instrumental)	6:37
15.	"Faction 06" (Instrumental)	2:33
16.	"Down to Earth" (Klayton Remix (Instrumental))	6:15
17.	"Heart On" (Aesthetic Perfection Remix (Instrumental))	4:28
18.	"Down to Earth" (KATFYR Remix (Instrumental))	4:26
19.	"Heart On" (SeamlessR Remix (Instrumental))	4:56
20.	"Heart On" (Mister Faux Remix (Instrumental))	5:04
Total length:		1:32:32

=== Chapter 03: Dreams ===
On February 18, the Celldweller Facebook page was, once again, blacked out, the next day, the emblem sequence was reuploaded with a distorted green emblem, mere hours later, a trailer was released for Chapter 03, entitled Dreams, and pre-orders went live.

The album includes three more "Factions", two songs, "Good L_ck (Yo_'re F_cked)" and "Just Like You", four remixes, eight instrumentals and a clean version of "Good L_ck (Yo_'re F_cked)", Dreams was released on March 13, 2015.

As an extra bonus, Klayton shed some light on the inspiration & creation of Good L_ck, Yo_’re F_cked: "Chapter 03 has probably been the most fun I’ve had making the album so far. The biggest reason being I wrote “Good L_ck (Yo_’re F_cked) as someone else. What does that exactly mean? Friend and colleague Grant Mohrman and I have been working on a movie script. The story revolves around an individual who fronts an electronic punk rock band. Although that aspect of the story no longer exists, I wrote this song before we scrapped that idea. I was envisioning a song that would open the entire movie, including lyrics that applied to the premise of the film. It’s rare for me to write an entire song in a day, but that’s what happened with G.L.Y.F. – because I took a moment to shed the concept of being Celldweller and instead wrote from the perspective of someone else. Then I reproduced the song from the ground up and it became a Celldweller track that naturally fits alongside everything else in the End of an Empire universe."

Chapter 03: Dreams
No.	Title	Length
1.	"Faction 07"	0:30
2.	"Good L_ck (Yo_'re F_cked)"	3:35
3.	"Just Like You"	5:03
4.	"Faction 08"	2:24
5.	"Faction 09"	3:20
6.	"Good L_ck (Yo_'re F_cked)" (HECQ Remix)	6:04
7.	"Just Like You" (Tom Player Remix)	4:20
8.	"Good L_ck (Yo_'re F_cked)" (Combichrist Remix)	3:51
9.	"Just Like You" (Mobthrow Remix)	3:40
10.	"Good L_ck (Yo_'re F_cked)" (Clean)	3:35
11.	"Faction 07" (Instrumental)	0:30
12.	"Good L_ck (Yo_'re F_cked)" (Instrumental)	3:35
13.	"Just Like You" (Instrumental)	5:03
14.	"Faction 09" (Instrumental)	3:20
15.	"Good L_ck (Yo_'re F_cked)" (HECQ Remix (Instrumental))	6:04
16.	"Just Like You" (Tom Player Remix (Instrumental))	4:20
17.	"Good L_ck (Yo_'re F_cked)" (Combichrist Remix (Instrumental))	3:51
18.	"Just Like You" (Mobthrow Remix (Instrumental))	3:40
Total length:		1:06:45

=== Chapter 04: Death ===
The fourth and final chapter, titled "Death", was released on July 17, 2015.

Chapter 04: Death
No.	Title	Length
1.	"Faction 10"	0:44
2.	"New Elysium"	6:52
3.	"Precious One"	6:48
4.	"Faction 11"	3:34
5.	"Faction 12"	3:05
6.	"New Elysium" (Zardonic Remix)	5:06
7.	"Precious One" (Drumcorps Remix)	4:07
8.	"New Elysium" (The Algorithm Remix)	4:51
9.	"Precious One" (Rhys Fulber Remix)	7:09
10.	"Faction 10" (Instrumental)	0:43
11.	"New Elysium" (Instrumental)	6:52
12.	"Precious One" (Instrumental)	6:48
13.	"New Elysium" (Zardonic Remix (Instrumental))	5:06
14.	"Precious One" (Drumcorps Remix (Instrumental))	4:07
15.	"New Elysium" (The Algorithm Remix (Instrumental))	4:51
16.	"Precious One" (Rhys Fulber Remix (Instrumental))	7:09
Total length:		1:17:10

== Track listing ==
No.	Title	Length
1.	"Faction 01"	1:31
2.	"New Elysium"	6:52
3.	"End of an Empire"	7:33
4.	"Heart On"	6:37
5.	"Just Like You"	5:03
6.	"Lost in Time"	7:24
7.	"Faction 06"	2:33
8.	"Good L_ck (Yo_'re F_cked)"	3:36
9.	"Jericho"	5:18
10.	"Faction 13"	1:28
11.	"Breakout (feat. Scandroid)"	4:10
12.	"Down to Earth"	6:56
13.	"Precious One"	6:48
14.	"Jericho (Circle of Dust Remix)"	5:38
15.	"G4M3 0V3R"	2:39
Total length:		1:14:06

=== Deluxe edition ===
Deluxe Edition: CD 1
No.	Title	Length
1.	"End of an Empire"	7:33
2.	"Heart On"	6:37
3.	"Down to Earth"	6:56
4.	"New Elysium"	6:52
5.	"Just Like You"	5:03
6.	"Good L_ck (Yo_'re F_cked)"	3:36
7.	"Lost in Time"	7:24
8.	"Breakout (feat. Scandroid)"	4:10
9.	"Jericho"	5:18
10.	"Precious One"	6:48

Deluxe Edition: CD 2
No.	Title	Length
1.	"Faction 01"	1:31
2.	"Faction 02"	2:07
3.	"Faction 03"	2:32
4.	"Faction 04"	0:40
5.	"Faction 05"	2:02
6.	"Faction 06"	3:03
7.	"Faction 07"	0:30
8.	"Faction 08"	2:09
9.	"Faction 09"	3:20
10.	"Faction 10"	0:43
11.	"Faction 11"	3:33
12.	"Faction 12"	3:04
13.	"Faction 13"	1:28
14.	"Faction 14"	2:34
15.	"Faction 15"	5:03
16.	"G4M3 0V3R"	2:39
17.	"Down to Earth (Celldweller Remix)"	6:15
18.	"N3W 3LY51UM"	1:18
19.	"Jericho (Circle of Dust Remix)"	5:38
20.	"G00D LUCK (Y0U'R3 833P3D)"	1:07
21.	"J3R1CH0"	1:17
22.	"Breakout (feat. Scandroid) (Scandroid Remix)"	4:19
23.	"D0WN 2 34RTH"	1:03

=== Collector's edition (5-CD box set) ===
The five disc collectors edition contains the whole End of an Empire album, and all the tracks released on all four chapters, including the Factions, remixes and instrumentals. There is a bonus download - The Remixes (Instrumentals) available by purchasing through the FiXT online store.

Disc 1: End of an Empire
No.	Title	Length
1.	"End of an Empire"	7:33
2.	"Heart On"	6:37
3.	"Down to Earth"	6:56
4.	"New Elysium"	6:52
5.	"Just Like You"	5:03
6.	"Good L_ck (Yo_'re F_cked)"	3:36
7.	"Lost in Time"	7:24
8.	"Breakout (feat. Scandroid)"	4:10
9.	"Jericho"	5:18
10.	"Precious One"	6:48

Disc 2: Factions
No.	Title	Length
1.	"Faction 01"	1:31
2.	"Faction 02"	2:07
3.	"Faction 03"	2:32
4.	"Faction 04"	0:40
5.	"Faction 05"	2:02
6.	"Faction 06"	3:03
7.	"Faction 07"	0:30
8.	"Faction 08"	2:09
9.	"Faction 09"	3:20
10.	"Faction 10"	0:43
11.	"Faction 11"	3:33
12.	"Faction 12"	3:04
13.	"Faction 13"	1:28
14.	"Faction 14"	2:34
15.	"Faction 15"	5:03
16.	"Faction 01 (Instrumental)"	1:31
17.	"Faction 02 (Instrumental)"	2:07
18.	"Faction 04 (Instrumental)"	0:40
19.	"Faction 06 (Instrumental)"	3:03
20.	"Faction 07 (Instrumental)"	0:30
21.	"Faction 09 (Instrumental)"	3:20
22.	"Faction 10 (Instrumental)"	0:43
23.	"Faction 13 (Instrumental)"	1:28

Disc 3: Instrumentals
No.	Title	Length
1.	"End of an Empire (Instrumental)"	7:33
2.	"Heart On (Instrumental)"	6:37
3.	"Down to Earth (Instrumental)"	6:56
4.	"New Elysium (Instrumental)"	6:52
5.	"Just Like You (Instrumental)"	5:03
6.	"Good L_ck (Yo_'re F_cked) (Instrumental)"	3:36
7.	"Lost in Time (Instrumental)"	7:24
8.	"Breakout (feat. Scandroid) (Instrumental)"	4:10
9.	"Jericho (Instrumental)"	5:18
10.	"Precious One (Instrumental)"	6:48

Disc 4: The Remixes (Part I)
No.	Title	Length
1.	"G4M3 0V3R"	2:39
2.	"Down to Earth (KATFYR Remix)"	4:26
3.	"Heart On (Aesthetic Perfection Remix)"	4:28
4.	"Lost in Time (KJ Sawka Remix)"	3:30
5.	"End of an Empire (Comaduster Remix)"	4:58
6.	"G00D LUCK (Y0U’R3 833P3D)"	1:07
7.	"Jericho (Circle of Dust Remix)"	5:38
8.	"New Elysium (The Algorithm Remix)"	4:51
9.	"Good L_ck (Yo_’re F_cked) (Combichrist Remix)"	3:51
10.	"N3W 3LY51UM"	1:18
11.	"Precious One (Drumcorps Remix)"	4:07
12.	"Breakout (feat. Scandroid) (I Will Never Be the Same Remix)"	5:12
13.	"Just Like You (Tom Player Remix)"	4:20

Disc 5: The Remixes (Part II)
No.	Title	Length
1.	"J3R1CH0"	1:17
2.	"New Elysium (Zardonic Remix)"	5:06
3.	"Down to Earth (Celldweller Remix)"	6:15
4.	"Breakout (feat. Scandroid) (Scandroid Remix)"	4:19
5.	"Good L_ck (Yo_’re F_cked) (Hecq Remix)"	6:04
6.	"Heart On (Mister Faux Remix)"	5:04
7.	"D0WN 2 34RTH"	1:03
8.	"Just Like You (Mobthrow Remix)"	3:40
9.	"Lost in Time (OCTiV Remix)"	4:43
10.	"End of an Empire (Breathe Carolina Remix)"	3:38
11.	"Heart On (SeamlessR Remix)"	4:56
12.	"Precious One (Rhys Fulber Remix)"	7:09
