= Doom (film) =

2005 film by Andrzej Bartkowiak

- Theatrical release poster
- Directed by: Andrzej Bartkowiak
- Screenplay by: David Callaham; Wesley Strick
- Story by: David Callaham
- Based on: Doom by id Software
- Produced by: John Wells; Lorenzo di Bonaventura
- Starring: Karl Urban; Rosamund Pike; The Rock
- Cinematography: Tony Pierce-Roberts
- Edited by: Derek Brechin
- Music by: Clint Mansell
- Production companies: Universal Pictures; John Wells Productions; di Bonaventura Pictures; Doom Productions Ltd.; Stillking Films SRO; BPS Babelsberg Production Services GmbH; Reaper Productions LLC; Distant Planet Productions Ltd.
- Distributed by: Universal Pictures (U.S.); United International Pictures (International)
- Release dates: October 17, 2005 (Los Angeles); October 21, 2005 (U.S.); October 27, 2005 (Germany); November 3, 2005 (Czech Republic); December 2, 2005 (U.K.)
- Running time: 104 minutes
- Countries: United States; United Kingdom; Germany; Czech Republic
- Language: English
- Budget: $60–70 million
- Box office: $58.7 million

Doom is a 2005 science fiction horror film based on the video game series of the same name developed by id Software. Directed by Andrzej Bartkowiak, the film stars Karl Urban, Rosamund Pike, and Dwayne "The Rock" Johnson. In the film, marines are sent on a rescue mission to a facility on Mars, where they encounter demon-like creatures.

An international co-production of the United States, the United Kingdom, Czech Republic, and Germany, Doom was theatrically released in the United States on October 21, 2005, to negative reviews. The film was a box office bomb, grossing $58.7 million worldwide against a production budget between $60–70 million. In 2019, Universal released a second live-action film direct-to-video titled Doom: Annihilation.

== Plot ==
In 2026, the Ark, a wormhole portal to an ancient city on Mars, is discovered deep below the Nevada desert. Twenty years later, the 85 personnel at the Union Aerospace Corporation (UAC) research facility on Mars are attacked by an unknown assailant. Following a distress call sent by Dr. Carmack, a squad of eight marines are sent to the research facility. The team includes squad leader Sgt. Asher "Sarge" Mahonin, "Duke", "Goat", "Destroyer", Portman, "Mac", "Kid", and John "Reaper" Grimm. They are sent on a search-and-destroy mission to Mars, with UAC only concerned with the retrieval of computer data from their anthropology, archeology, and genetics experiments.

The team uses the Ark to reach Mars, ordering the Earth site on lockdown. Arriving on Mars, they are met by UAC employee "Pinky". Reaper finds his twin sister, Dr. Sam Grimm, and escorts her to retrieve the data. He learns that a dig site, where their parents were accidentally killed years earlier, was reopened and ancient skeletons of a humanoid race genetically enhanced with an artificial 24th chromosome pair were discovered.

While searching for survivors in the facility, the marines find a traumatized and injured Dr. Carmack and escort him to the medical lab for treatment, but he later disappears. The marines shoot at an unknown creature in the genetics lab that leads them down into the facility's sewer, where it attacks and kills Goat. They kill the creature and take it to the medical lab, where Sam performs an autopsy and discovers that its organs are human. She and Duke witness Goat resurrecting and killing himself by smashing his head against a reinforced window. The two are attacked by a creature which they soon deduce is a mutated Dr. Carmack.

The squad methodically tracks down and destroys several of the creatures, though Mac, Destroyer, and Portman die in the process. An angered Sarge kills the mutated Dr. Carmack. Sam, Reaper, and Sarge learn that UAC was experimenting on humans using the extra Martian Chromosome (C24) harvested from the remains of the ancient skeletons, but the mutants got loose, leading to the outbreak. Sam and Reaper try to convince Sarge that the creatures are humans from the facility, mutated by the C24 serum and that not all of those infected will fully transform into the creatures. Sam hypothesizes that some of those injected with C24 will develop superhuman abilities but retain their humanity, while others with a predisposition for violent or psychotic behavior will become creatures, a pattern she believes also happened with the Martians, who built the Ark to escape.

Some creatures use the Ark to reach Earth, where they slaughter or mutate the research staff. The marines, Sam, and Pinky follow, and Sarge orders the squad to sanitize the entire facility. When Kid informs Sarge that he found, but refuses to kill, a group of survivors, Sarge executes Kid for insubordination, leading to a standoff with an armed Pinky. The group is suddenly attacked by creatures who kill Duke and drag Sarge and Pinky away. Reaper is wounded by a ricocheting bullet. To prevent him from bleeding to death, Sam injects her brother with the C24 serum.

Reaper regains consciousness and finds his wounds have healed and that Sam has gone missing. Using his new C24 superhuman abilities, he fights his way through the facility, even battling a mutated and monstrous Pinky before finding an unconscious Sam with Sarge, who has become infected and has killed the group of survivors Kid had previously found. Reaper and Sarge battle, both of them enhanced with superhuman powers. Reaper is able to gain the upper hand and throws Sarge through the Ark back to Mars along with a grenade, which destroys Sarge and the Mars facility. Reaper then carries his unconscious sister into the elevator and heads back up to the surface.

== Cast ==
- Karl Urban as John "Reaper" Grimm
- Dwayne "The Rock" Johnson as Sgt. Asher "Sarge" Mahonin
- Rosamund Pike as Dr. Samantha "Sam" Grimm
- Deobia Oparei as Roark "Destroyer" Gannon
- Ben Daniels as Eric "Goat" Fantom
- Raz Adoti as Gregory "Duke" Schofield
- Richard Brake as Dean Portman
- Dexter Fletcher as Marcus "Pinky" Pinzerowski
- Al Weaver as Mark "Kid" Dantalian
- Yao Chin as Katsuhiko Kumanosuke "Mac" Takahashi
- Robert Russell as Dr. Todd Carmack
  - Doug Jones as Carmack imp / Sewer imp
- Brian Steele as Curtis Stahl / Hell Knight

== Production ==
=== Development ===
Between 1994 and 1995, following the success of Doom II, Hollywood began gaining interest in producing a live-action film adaptation of Doom. Universal Pictures initially acquired the rights, which were later obtained by Columbia TriStar. Former CEO of id Software Todd Hollenshead stated that a number of factors prevented the project from moving forward such as the Columbine High School massacre, lack of producers, and poor scripts. The id Software team screened a presentation of Doom 3 to agents from Creative Artists Agency (CAA) to see if they were interested in the property. Producers Lorenzo di Bonaventura and John Wells eventually obtained the rights.

Di Bonaventura and Wells initially set development for the film at Warner Bros., however, the duo moved development of the project to Universal after Warner Bros. failed to move the project into production after 15 months. The terms of the deal with Universal included gross point royalties for the developer and rights holder. In 2004, Enda McCallion was attached to direct the film and David Callaham was named the screenwriter, with the script loosely adapting elements from Doom 3. Callaham's early draft featured the Cacodemon, Arch-Vile, and other demons from the games but were cut due to time and budgetary reasons. That September, McCallion dropped out as director and Andrzej Bartkowiak joined the project. Edgar Wright and Simon Pegg were approached to polish the script's dialogue, but declined and Wesley Strick was hired instead. Production was scheduled to begin in Winter 2004 in Prague.

=== Pre-production ===
Vin Diesel was offered the lead but turned it down. Dwayne Johnson was offered the role of "John Grimm" but turned it down in favor of "Sarge", stating, "For some reason I was drawn more to Sarge, I thought 'Sarge' was, to me, more interesting and had a darker side." In September 2004, Karl Urban and Rosamund Pike were cast as twins John and Samantha Grimm. The Rapid Response Tactical Squad actors underwent military training for two weeks under military advisor Tom McAdams.

=== Filming ===
Principal photography took place at Barrandov Studios in Prague, Czech Republic.

=== Effects ===
Monsters and creature effects for the film were created by Stan Winston Studios, supervised by John Rosengrant. The visual effects were supervised by Jon Farhat. The film included 350 effects shots, the work was shared between two companies, Framestore who focused on character animation and creature work in 130 shots, and Double Negative who worked on environments, dimensional effects and futuristic weapons in about 200 shots. Pictures of Johnson were taken to conceptualize his demon makeup. The second layer of prosthetics took two hours to apply on Johnson while the third level of prosthetics took three hours to apply. Acrylic paint was used to cover Johnson's tattoos. After the 2D concept art, the creatures were sculpted and body-cast. Brian Steele and Doug Jones underwent head and shoulder life casting and body casting to get an impression for their body frames. An earpiece was added into the suits so that Jones and Steele could receive directions from Rosengrant, however, their mics were not enabled for them to reply. The team drew upon forensic pathology books to give the creatures a repulsive nature.

=== First person shooter sequence ===
The first person shooter sequence was completely directed by Farhat and was filmed in 14 days after a planning period of three months. While the scene is one continuous shot, multiple cuts, that Farhat called "hook-ups", were made during filming. Farhat stated, "you can do it by moving a camera, and passing something, and cutting. And then rolling the camera again on a subsequent date." Other hook-up styles were employed by using a green screen or blue screen when a door opens or jump cutting by whipping an object. The gun was only used on-screen when it was needed due to its size affecting the aspect ratio.

=== Music ===
The film's score was composed by Clint Mansell, upon which he produced a remix of the Nine Inch Nails song "You Know What You Are?", which was used in the film's ending credits. The song "Switchback" by Celldweller was licensed for the trailers.

== Release ==
=== Home media ===
Doom was released on VHS, UMD, and DVD on February 7, 2006, HD DVD on April 26, 2006, and on Blu-ray Disc on February 10, 2009. The DVD, HD DVD, and Blu-ray releases only feature the unrated extended cut, with no options for the theatrical cut. The extended cut runs 113 minutes. In the United States and Canada, the DVD earned $29.2 million in domestic video sales. The extended cut was released on 4K Blu-ray on August 9, 2022.

== Reception ==
=== Box office ===
On its opening weekend, Doom debuted in 3,043 theaters in the United States and Canada and grossed a disappointing $15.5 million but was still number one at the US and Canadian box office. The opening weekend audience was mainly made up of young males familiar with the video game. It opened the same day in nine international territories where it grossed $1.3 million, including number one spots in Malaysia and Thailand. In the United States and Canada, the film grossed $28.2 million and grossed $30.5 million internationally, totalling $58.7 million worldwide.

=== Critical response ===
Doom received negative reviews from critics. On Rotten Tomatoes, the film has an approval rating of 18%, based on 137 reviews, with an average rating of 4/10. The site's critical consensus states: "The FPS sections are sure to please fans of the video game, but lacking in plot and originality to please other moviegoers." On Metacritic, the film has a weighted average rating of 34 out of 100, based on reviews from 28 critics, indicating "generally unfavorable" reviews. Audiences surveyed by CinemaScore gave the film a grade B− on scale of A to F.

Roger Ebert said, "Doom is like some kid came over and is using your computer and won't let you play." Rob Gonsalves gave it two stars, citing incoherent action sequences, flat and humorless characters, and poor acting: "Only Richard Brake, as the sleazy and duplicitous grunt Portman, gives a performance of any interest, and even that's on the level of caricature." Kim Newman of Empire magazine called it "Not quite as dreadful as Resident Evil: Apocalypse, but that's hardly a major achievement." Justin Chang of Variety gave the film a mixed review and was critical of Johnson's performance but positive about the "tongue-in-cheek sensibility" and the faithful display of weapons from the game. In summary: "It's really not all that bad. Ultra-derivative bigscreen transplant of one of the most successful (and controversial) games ever made plays like a mutant cross between a biotech thriller and a zombie movie, with all the alien autopsies, blood-gushing protuberances and meaningless scientific jargon that come with the territory."

Richard James Havis of The Hollywood Reporter wrote: "Plot, character development and dialogue are so sparse that the screenwriters are fortunate they're not paid by the word. But this basic approach doesn't render it ineffectual. There's so little to go wrong that those who like their entertainment mindless and violent will find little fault." Chris Carle at IGN gave it 3 out of 5 and called it "easily the best videogame-to-film adaptation yet", saying although it is not big on plot or characterization "it succeeds in the things it sets out to do".

==== Other responses ====
John Carmack (co-founder of id Software and co-creator of Doom) spoke favorably of the film, stating, "I liked it. Nobody expects a video game movie to be Oscar material, but I thought it was a solid action movie with lots of fun nods to the gaming community." John Romero declined to comment on the film in a 2018 WeAreDevelopers Q&A session. In 2009, Dwayne Johnson described the film as an example of "trying and failing" to do a good video game adaptation, and that it was a cautionary tale of what "not to do".

In later years, Rosamund Pike expressed embarrassment for not familiarizing herself with the source material. Pike accepted the role because she felt "I can do anything" but admitted that she underestimated the scale of an action production, stating "I was just out of my comfort zone, out of my league, out of my depth.” She added that Doom was "probably one of the worst films ever made", noting that the film's poor response with critics, fans, and the box office could have ended her career.

=== Accolades ===
In 2009, Time listed the film on its list of top-10 worst video games movies. Johnson received a Golden Raspberry Award nomination for his performance.

== Reboot ==
In an October 2005 interview, executive producer John Wells stated that a second film would be put into production if the first was a box office success. In April 2018, Universal Pictures announced plans for a new Doom film. Doom: Annihilation was released direct-to-video on October 1, 2019.

== See also ==
- List of films based on video games
- List of films set on Mars

== Works cited ==
- Universal (2006a). Basic Training (Blu-ray/DVD). Universal Pictures Home Entertainment.
- Universal (2006b). Rock Formation (Blu-ray/DVD). Universal Pictures Home Entertainment.
- Universal (2006c). Master Monster Makers (Blu-ray/DVD). Universal Pictures Home Entertainment.
- Universal (2006d). First–Person Shooter Sequence (Blu-ray/DVD). Universal Pictures Home Entertainment.
