= Criss Angel discography =

Criss Angel (born Christopher Nicholas Sarantakos, December 19, 1967 in East Meadow, New York) is an American musician, and magician.

== Discography ==
All of these albums were self-released under APITRAG Records.

Album	Notes
Musical Conjurings from the World of Illusion (1998)	As Angeldust.
System 1 in Trilogy (2000)	Same tracks as Musical Conjurings from the World of Illusion. Features intro dialogue of Come Alive by Clive Barker. All songs written, produced, arranged, performed & mixed by Criss Angel & Klayton.
System 2 in Trilogy (2000)	All songs written, produced, arranged, performed & mixed by Criss Angel & Klayton.
System 3 in Trilogy (2000)	All songs written, produced, arranged, performed & mixed by Criss Angel & Klayton.
Mindfreak (2002)	Intended as a soundtrack for his Mindfreak show. All songs written, produced, arranged, performed & mixed by Criss Angel & Klayton.
Supernatural (2003)	Unreleased, exact track listing unavailable. Soundtrack for his Supernatural special.
Mindfreak The Official Soundtrack (2006)	Mindfreak television series official soundtrack. "MindFreak2" features Sully Erna of Godsmack and Nuno Bettencourt from Extreme. "Mindfreak (Season 1 Theme)" produced by Jonathan Davis of Korn.
