= Satellites (Celldweller album) =

Studio album by Celldweller
- Released: October 14, 2022
- Recorded: 2017–2021
- Genres: Industrial metal; electronic rock; metalcore; progressive metal
- Length: 42:56
- Label: FiXT
- Producer: Klayton

Celldweller chronology
Offworld (2017)	Satellites (2022)	Celldweller (Definitive Edition) (2024)

Singles from Satellites
- 1. "Electric Eye" Released: 2017; 2. "My Disintegration" Released: February 18, 2019; 3. "A Matter of Time" Released: April 18, 2019; 4. "Into the Void" Released: October 31, 2019; 5. "Baptized in Fire" Released: May 29, 2020; 6. "Blind Lead the Blind" Released: October 29, 2021

Satellites is the fifth vocal studio album (eighth overall) by the American electronic rock project Celldweller, released on October 14, 2022. It marked a return to Celldweller's usual style of metal and electronic music from his previous record, Offworld, which featured a much softer musical sound. Six singles were released in the five years leading up to the album's release. A non-single track, "Soul Parasites", was later remixed by FiXT Music labelmates Void Chapter.

== Track listing ==
All tracks are written by Klayton.

No.	Title	Length
1.	"Into the Void"	5:17
2.	"Blind Lead the Blind"	6:00
3.	"A Matter of Time"	6:06
4.	"My Disintegration"	6:21
5.	"Soul Parasites"	3:30
6.	"Electric Eye"	5:25
7.	"Baptized in Fire"	6:02
8.	"The End of the World"	4:15
Total length:		42:56
