= Soundtrack for the Voices in My Head Vol. 02 =

Soundtrack for the Voices in My Head: Vol. 02
- Complete edition

Studio album by Celldweller
- Released: July 24, 2012; June 10, 2010(Chapter 01); February 14, 2012(Chapter 02); July 24, 2012(Chapter 03)
- Recorded: 2009–2012
- Genre: Instrumental rock; dubstep; electronic rock; drum and bass; experimental music; ambient; industrial metal
- Length: 66:16
- Label: FiXT Music
- Producer: Klayton

Celldweller chronology
Wish Upon a Blackstar (2009–2012)	Soundtrack for the Voices in My Head: Vol. 02 (2012)	Celldweller 10 Year Anniversary Edition (2012)

Singles from Soundtrack for the Voices in My Head Vol. 02
- 1. "Elara" Released: March 2, 2012; 2. "First Person Shooter" Released: July 13, 2012

Soundtrack for the Voices in My Head: Vol. 02 is the second production-based (fourth overall) studio album by the American electronic rock artist, Celldweller. It is the second album in the Soundtrack for the Voices in My Head series.

== Production ==
Soundtrack for the Voices in My Head Vol. 02 is a production based album intended for film, TV, and video game licensing. It was released in Chapters, similarly to Wish Upon a Blackstar, but in just three Chapters. The first two Chapters were released as Limited Edition CDs as well and not just as digital downloads. The album has been work in progress since 2009.

The full album was released on July 24, 2012.

== Release ==
=== Chapter 01 ===
A four-minute excerpt of the track "Adrift on Celestial Seas" was released on iTunes on March 1, 2010, as part of Klayton's "Fixtape" mix. The four-minute excerpt of "Adrift on Celestial Seas" is the last track on the fixtape. No other track list for the album had been mentioned (except for one other song: "The Wings of Icarus") until June 4, 2010, when he mentioned the rest of the track listing: "Pulsar" and "The Sentinel". On June 10, 2010, Klayton released the first Chapter of the album, containing 4 songs.

=== Chapter 02 ===
Initially, two songs had been mentioned to be on Chapter 02, namely "Senorita Bonita" of which a demo version was released with the Groupees Unreleased EP and "Earth Scraper". The tracks "Earth Scraper", "Empyrean" and "Heart-Break" were later revealed on Position Music's website and they were released on the Groupees website on October 26, 2011, in a Halloween charity event.

Chapter 02 was officially released on February 14, 2012. Those who took part in the Celldweller Hot Topic T-shirt contest received an exclusive free download code before the official release date.

On March 2, 2012, an additional SVH Vol. 2 song, "Elara" was released as a single.

=== Chapter 03 ===
On May 29, 2012, Klayton stated that he had wrapped up "the 4th new [Soundtrack for the Voices in My Head Vol. 02] track" in addition to those released on the first two Chapters. He has also stated that he plans to make 3 or 4 more tracks for the final CD which implies that Chapter 03 is the final Chapter. On June 29, 2012, Klayton announced that the full album can be expected around "August/Sept" and "it's 18 tracks deep, over 65 minutes."

On July 13, 2012, Klayton released a new song, "First Person Shooter" from the upcoming SVH Vol. 02 album as a single. The release date of the full album was also announced. On July 19, 2012, the cover art of the full SVH Vol. 02 album was revealed. The album was released on July 24, 2012, but for digital download only as the CDs did not ship until August 21.

== Track listing ==
No.	Title	Length
1.	"First Person Shooter"	2:51
2.	"Earth Scraper"	2:22
3.	"The Wings of Icarus" (featuring James Dooley)	2:58
4.	"ShutEmDown"	2:22
5.	"Senorita Bonita"	1:38
6.	"The Sentinel"	3:12
7.	"Distants"	2:19
8.	"How This All Began"	2:42
9.	"Scandroid"	1:20
10.	"Pulsar"	2:00
11.	"Solid State Playmate"	2:07
12.	"Empyrean"	2:03
13.	"Chronus"	3:27
14.	"Heart-Break"	1:51
15.	"Elara"	2:57
16.	"Awakening"	1:11
17.	"The End"	3:54
18.	"Venus"	5:02
19.	"Adrift on Celestial Seas"	20:00
Total length:		66:16

== Personnel ==
=== Celldweller ===
- Klayton – vocals, synthesizers, guitar, bass, percussion, songwriting, production, mixing, editing, mastering, programming

=== Additional personnel ===
- James Dooley – orchestration on "The Wings of Icarus"
- Tyler Bacon – licensing

=== Artwork and packaging ===
- Nicolas Thureau – artwork and layout for Chapter 01
- Matt Gondek – artwork for Chapter 02
- Josh Viola of The Bane of Yoto and Aaron Lovett – artwork for "First Person Shooter" single
- Erica Schaub – artwork design and layout design
- Craig Shields – digital photo manipulation
- Miranda – Elara model
- Karen – Elara wardrobe
- Christina Travis, Jillian Johns – hair/makeup
- Chuck Wheeler – album photos

== Licensing ==
- "The Wings of Icarus" was used in the Real Steel movie trailer in the Abraham Lincoln: Vampire Hunter "The Secret Life" trailer and in America's Next Top Model Cycle 16 Episode Francesco Carrozzini at the Geoffrey Mac fashion show.
- "Earth Scraper" was used in the Assassin's Creed: Revelations "Combat Trailer", in the Mission: Impossible – Ghost Protocol trailer and in the Abraham Lincoln: Vampire Hunter "The Secret Life" trailer.
- "ShutEmDown" was used in the Ghost Rider: Spirit of Vengeance movie trailer in a John Carter TV spot and in the trailer of Now You See Me.
- "Pulsar" was used in the video game Asphalt 8: Airborne as one of the menu songs.
