= Spectral variability hypothesis =

Ecological theory

The Spectral Variability Hypothesis (SVH) states that spatial variability in the reflectance of vegetated surfaces relates to plant species richness. It has been originally coined by Palmer et al. (2000) and states that "species richness will be positively related to any objective measure (e.g. standard deviation) of the variation in the spectral characteristics of a remotely sensed image". The underlying assumption is that habitats differ in reflectance and if there are more habitats in an area, higher numbers of species are to be expected. The hypothesis has later also been termed the Spectral Variation Hypothesis. With high spatial resolution, variability in reflectance may also be a direct expression of plant individuals belonging to different species. The Spectral Variability Hypothesis was well received in the research community due to its apparent straightforwardness.

Tests of the hypothesis showed considerable variation in the connectedness between spatial variation of reflectance and plant species richness. This variation can be attributed to several reasons. A major problem already noted by Palmer (2002) is the fact that different habitats support different species numbers so the relationship between habitat heterogeneity and species numbers differs depending on which habitats are involved. This means that spatial heterogeneity in reflectance does not show a generalizable link to species richness. Accordingly, the Spectral Variability Hypothesis has been rejected for coarse scale levels where high plant species richness can occur in areas of low spectral variability and vice versa. Other factors impacting the relationship between spectral heterogeneity and species numbers are differences in extent and selection of the areas of investigation, spatial grain (pixel size of the applied remote sensing data), spectral resolution (including the width of the bands and the spectral region covered by the bands) and also the timing of an investigation

== See also ==
- Essential Biodiversity Variables
