= Subkulture =

Subkulture Music Group
- Founded: 1994
- Founder: Gerard Delarosa, Doi Porras, Liza Gernan, Marvin Manalo
- Genre: Gothic, industrial
- Location: Manila, Philippines
- Official website: www.subkulture.net

Subkulture is a music magazine and online community dedicated to gothic music and culture.

== History ==
The website was originally an events management and promotion label during the mid-1990s. Fliers promoting events produced by Subkulture note that they are benefit events.

Subkulture was also a distributor of American Industrialnation magazine in the Philippines. Subkulture helped advance the career of young bands in the Philippines, including Sea of Rains.

Subkulture online magazine was launched at the end of 2011.

== The Eastern Goth Valley ==
Eternal Death Wake (EDW) Music Festival
- Genre: Goth music
- Dates: Halloween
- Location: Philippines
- Founders: Subkulture

Subkulture's Eternal Death Wake (EDW) Music Festival, known as The Eastern Goth Valley, is an annual Halloween music gathering held every October in the Philippines. It was the first goth festival in the Philippines, and has been featured in Japan's counterculture magazine Burst as well as various TV programs.

The EDW event has hosted foreign artists such as the Angina Pectoris (Germany), Eve of Destiny (Japan), Kozi (Japan), Roughhausen (Canada and Taiwan ), DJ Eiji (Japan), Haruhiko Ash (Japan), DJ Nekrokael (France), and Psydoll (Japan).

== See also ==
- List of electronic music festivals
- List of gothic festivals
