= Matt Gondek =

American visual artist

- Born: Pittsburgh, Pennsylvania
- Occupation: Visual artist
- Known for: Deconstructed pop art
- Website: mattgondek.com

Matt Gondek is an American pop artist. He is a painter, muralist, and graphic illustrator focused on deconstructed pop art.

== Career ==
Gondek is based in Los Angeles while his paintings and sculptures have been featured at exhibitions worldwide including Los Angeles, New York, Paris, Bangkok, Hong Kong, Korea, and Singapore.

His works are usually done in vivid acrylic paint colors with bold lines featuring various cartoon and comic book characters such as Mickey Mouse, Bugs Bunny, and Homer Simpson often exploding, melting, or falling apart. His series "Fight Club" in 2022, a project including spiked baseball bats, was also offered as an NFT collection. In December 2022, it was reported that one of the 50 limited-edition pieces from his "Deconstructed Mickeys" collection in 2018, valued at HK$50,000, was stolen from a toy store owner in Hong Kong.

== Background ==
Gondek is a native of Pittsburgh, Pennsylvania. He was named "Best Local Artist" by Pittsburgh Magazine in 2011.

== Exhibitions ==
=== Solo exhibitions ===
- Missing Person - Tokyo, Japan (November 2022)
- Discipline - Mexico City (February 2022)
- RATS - Los Angeles (August 2021)
- Original Character - New York (April 2021)
- Mood Swings - Paris (October 2020)
- CONTROL - Los Angeles (November 2019)
- Clean Break - Bangkok, Thailand (April 2019)
- Growing Pains - Hong Kong (November 2018)
- Clean Break - New York (May 2018)
- Clean Break - Hong Kong (March 2018)
- American Gods - Hong Kong (November 2017)
- Glow in the Dark - Los Angeles, California (September 2017)
- Unholy Hand - Detroit, Michigan (November 2015)
- Struggles - Pittsburgh, Pennsylvania (April 2015)
- Kill 'Em All - Pittsburgh, Pennsylvania (September 2014)

=== Group exhibitions ===
- Korean Art Fair - South Korea (October 2021)
- Urban Art Fair - Paris (April 2018)
- Cartoon - London (May 2016)
