= Scandroid =

American synthwave music project

- Origin: Detroit, Michigan, U.S.
- Genres: Synthwave; synth-pop; electronic; house music; electro-house
- Years active: 2013–present
- Label: FiXT
- Members: Klayton
- Past members: Varien
- Website: klayton.info/artist-2/scandroid/

Scandroid is an American electronic music project created by Klayton, which previously included Varien in 2013. The project released its debut single, "Salvation Code", on August 6, 2013. Scandroid can be described as encompassing the retro synth melodies of the 1980s while still adapting to modern production, thus creating a new retro sound.

== Biography ==
=== Pre-album release (2013–2015) ===
An image was teased of a skull-like logo via the Celldweller Facebook page on July 16, 2013, hinting at an incoming project. On July 24, 2013, an official announcement was posted to Celldweller, simply titled "What is the Salvation Code?" In continuation with the teaser, their website SalvationCode.com launched, requiring a password for entry; this password could be found using hints from previous videos as well as from a riddle sent out to users who submitted a "forgotten password" form. After entering the password ("2513"), the users could access an extended preview of the unreleased song used in the previous teaser, and were given the hint that August 6, 2013, would be the release of the full song, "Salvation Code".

During the teaser of the second video, an image of Klayton (as Red) and Varien (as Raven) can be seen implying the duo working together on this new single. Both musicians posted to their individual social pages, along with the newly created Scandroid page. The post stated that Scandroid's music would consist of elements of 1980s retro and electronic music with what they described as a "Neo-Tokyo" theme.

Their first single "Salvation Code" was released for free download on August 5, 2013, with an official store release the next day. New merchandise was teased via the Scandroid Facebook page, with a link to the download. The project was promoted on both the Celldweller and Varien social pages. On November 8, 2013, it was hinted by both Celldweller and Varien that a new Scandroid track would be released soon. Then on December 7, 2013, Scandroid released an image, with a comment stating that "Hidden in this flyer lies a clue regarding the next transmission...". Another teaser image released on the 11th, teasing a date ("12.13.13") alongside a quote "Get lost in the Datastream." On December 13, 2013, a new single titled Datastream was released with a new riddle; "Alter the extensions of a new beginning in order to READ what others can only SEE." When the single was released, an image was released along with the purchase of the track. This image's file extension could be changed to .pdf; in doing so the user would unlock a short story titled Scandroid Origins featuring both Red and Raven, written by Brenton Ryan.

Varien, signed as Nick Pittsinger on the label, announced a departure from Scandroid, deciding instead to focus purely on Varien on August 2, 2014. Three days later, Scandroid's new single "Empty Streets" was released.

=== Scandroid (2016) ===
This self-titled album was officially released on November 11, 2016, which charted for one week at No. 20 on the Billboard Heatseekers Albums chart, as well as the Billboard Top Dance/Electronic Albums at No. 5.

A cover of the Tears for Fears song "Shout" was premiered on November 10, 2016. Klayton intended to record it since first hearing it back in 1985. Roland Orzabal explained that the song is about the political protests from the aftermath of the Cold War, and that it was encouragement to protest. Tapping into this core meaning for inspiration, Klayton felt that in light of the political unrest of 2016, that it was time to finally cover the song. The song is described as remaining faithful to the original, while still adding its own flair using amazing synths that are reminiscent of classic 80s pop.

Although Varien was the writer for "Datastream" and "Salvation Code", according to the credits provided, Klayton produced, performed, mixed, and wrote the rest of the songs that debut on Scandroid (with the exception of "Shout", written by Ian Stanley and Roland Orzabal).

Scandroid track listing
No.	Title	Length
1.	"2517"	4:39
2.	"Salvation Code"	5:50
3.	"Aphelion"	5:35
4.	"Shout" (Tears for Fears cover)	3:58
5.	"Destination Unknown"	3:38
6.	"Connection"	3:57
7.	"Datastream"	4:29
8.	"Empty Streets"	4:59
9.	"Awakening With You"	5:02
10.	"Atom & E.E.V."	5:35
11.	"Neo-Tokyo"	6:13
12.	"Pro-bots & Robophobes" (featuring Circle of Dust)	4:02
13.	"Eden"	5:40
14.	"Singularity"	3:40
15.	"Eden (Waveshaper Remix)"	4:38
Total length:		72:18

=== Dreams of Neo-Tokyo (2017) ===
On March 31, 2017, a new album, Dreams of Neo-Tokyo, was released featuring remixes of the ten vocal tracks released on Scandroid. The release was remixed by artists such as Dance with the Dead, Pylot, Maks_SF, and Waveshaper. The remixes have been described as being subtle, still sounding like Scandroid, but also standing out as their own tracks.

==== Remix Compilation Contests (2017) ====
A contest held by Klayton in partnership with NewRetroWave would create three remix albums: Awakening With You (Remix Contest Compilation), Aphelion (Remix Contest Compilation), and Neo-Tokyo (Remix Contest Compilation). The contest was announced on March 9, 2017, and was held from March 12 to April 30. Participants could choose from three songs to remix; they would enter for a chance to be included on the official FiXT Store (on the Remix albums), as a NewRetroWave YouTube upload, as well as general cash prizes, merchandise prizes, and "more". As well as releasing information in regards to the winners of the competition, all three dates were released for the remix albums via NewRetroWave: "Awakening With You" on June 16, "Aphelion" on August 4, and "Neo-Tokyo" on September 15.

Dreams of Neo-Tokyo track listing
No.	Title	Length
1.	"Neo-Tokyo (Dance with the Dead Remix)"	5:52
2.	"Shout (Blue Stahli & Sunset Neon Remix)"	3:39
3.	"Awakening With You (Pylot Remix)"	4:57
4.	"Connection (Scandroid Remix)"	4:51
5.	"Eden (Waveshaper Remix)"	4:38
6.	"Aphelion (Maks_SF Remix)"	5:17
7.	"Empty Streets (GosT Remix)"	4:36
8.	"Pro-bots & Robophobes (Daniel Deluxe Remix)" (featuring Circle of Dust)	3:07
9.	"Salvation Code (Makeup and Vanity Set Remix)"	4:05
10.	"Datastream (d.notive Remix)"	5:28
Total length:		47:00

=== Monochrome (2017) ===
Released on October 27, 2017, Monochrome is considered the second full-length album of Scandroid. It charted for one week at No. 18 on the Billboard Heatseekers Albums chart, as well as on the Top Dance/Electronic Album Sales at No. 3. The album has numerous previously released singles, as well as new vocal and instrumental tracks that range from synth-pop to darkwave. Some notable covers include "The Force Theme", "Thriller", as well as the popular single "Rendezvous".

"The Force Theme" debuted on May 4, 2014, as a special single for Star Wars Day but was also included on Monochrome; Klayton had commented on "The Force Theme", stating, "I was inspired by artists like Tomita who re-imagined iconic Star Wars themes with synthesizers...I was excited to cover 'The Force Theme' because I wanted to blend classic analog synthesizers with a re-orchestration of the original song. Not only was I influenced by the classic Star Wars films, but I am inspired by the possibilities of the new films. Enjoy this May 4th release and may the Force be with you."

As a teaser for the upcoming release of Monochrome, Scandroid released a single of the popular Michael Jackson Halloween classic "Thriller". Its premiere was on October 12, 2017 however, its release was set for Friday the 13th, of October 2017, to fit in with the overall mood of the month. It is available on Monochrome, and remains its own single for individual purchase. A special remix by Pylot is also included on the full album. Klayton has been quoted stating he wanted to include this Halloween-themed track on Monochrome, admitting that he loved the song since he was a kid. The signature track of Monochrome, "Monochrome", premiered on October 25, 2017. The track is described as having layers of pulsing synths, and a robotic vocoder-infused vocal track. Its layers break away from the simple, often repetitive melody of most synthwave, which has become an oversaturated market due to rising popularity of the genre.

Monochrome track listing
No.	Title	Length
1.	"2518"	1:47
2.	"Afterglow"	5:22
3.	"Rendezvous"	4:11
4.	"Thriller" (Michael Jackson cover)	5:52
5.	"Oblivia"	4:45
6.	"Monochrome"	4:52
7.	"The Force Theme"	5:21
8.	"Future Bloodline"	4:45
9.	"A Thousand Years"	4:33
10.	"On the Face of the Deep"	3:42
11.	"The Veil"	4:48
12.	"Searching for a Lost Horizon"	2:58
13.	"Thriller (Pylot Remix)"	4:49
Total length:		57:45

=== The Darkness and The Light (2018–present) ===
Scandroid released an EP, The Darkness, on December 4, 2018. A second EP, The Light, was released on December 13, 2019, with both EPs combined into an album called The Darkness and the Light, released on December 11, 2020. A remix album, Dreams of Darkness, Visions of Light, was released on November 12, 2021.

In 2019, Scandroid appeared in the documentary film The Rise of the Synths, appearing alongside various other composers from the synthwave scene, including filmmaker John Carpenter who also narrated the film which explored the origins and growth of the genre.

The Darkness and The Light track listing
No.	Title	Length
1.	"Into the Darkness"	0:50
2.	"Phoenix"	4:35
3.	"The End Of Time"	5:49
4.	"Onyx"	3:47
5.	"Nighttime"	3:23
6.	"I Remember You"	4:21
7.	"Astor Place"	3:39
8.	"Out Of The Darknes"	3:30
9.	"Less Than Zero" (featuring King Protea)	4:21
10.	"Limelight"	3:15
11.	"Into the Light"	0:41
12.	"Writing's On The Wall"	4:16
13.	"Everywhere You Go"	2:54
14.	"Awakening"	3:56
15.	"New York City Nights"	5:04
16.	"Time Crime"	5:16
17.	"Purified"	6:54
18.	"Dark Tide" (featuring Megan McDuffee)	3:39
19.	"Red Planet"	4:37
Total length:		1:14:35

== Musical style ==
The aim of this project was to create music that consisted of elements from 1980s retro and electronic music with what the duo have described as a "Neo-Tokyo" theme. DJZ called the duos first song "Salvation Code" a "...retro synth-pop tune that harkens back to past visions of a cyberpunk future." and that it was a sci-fi narrative song.

"...what Scandroid does well is bring a slightly different flair to the meat-and-potatoes synthwave sound that adds different enough musculature and flesh to the familiar skeleton..." – Simon Handmaker (of Heavy Blog is Heavy)

== Discography ==
=== Albums ===
Year	Album	Label
2016	Scandroid	FiXT Music
2017	Monochrome	FiXT Music
2020	The Darkness and the Light	FiXT Music

=== EPs ===
Year	Album	Label
2018	The Darkness	FiXT Music
2019	The Light	FiXT Music

=== Singles ===
Year	Song	Album
2013	"Salvation Code"	Scandroid
2013	"Datastream"	Scandroid
2014	"Empty Streets"	Scandroid
2014	"Aphelion"	Scandroid
2016	"Pro-bots & Robophobes (featuring Circle of Dust)"	Scandroid
2017	"Rendezvous"	Monochrome
2017	"The Force Theme"	Monochrome
2017	"A Thousand Years"	Monochrome
2017	"Thriller"	Monochrome
2017	"Shout (DJ Stranger Remix)"	Dreams in Monochrome
2018	"Time Crime"	The Darkness and the Light
2018	"New York City Nights"	The Darkness and the Light
2018	"Red Planet"	The Darkness and the Light
2018	"Afterglow (Michael Oakley Remix)"	(Non-album single)
2019	"Writing's on the Wall"	The Darkness and the Light
2020	"Astor Place"	FiXT Neon: Altered
2020	"Nighttime"	The Darkness and the Light
2020	"Awakening"	FiXT Neon: Gravity
2020	"Less Than Zero (feat. King Protea)"	The Darkness and the Light
2020	"Dark Tide (feat. Megan McDuffee)"	The Darkness and the Light
2021	"Hark! The Herald Angels Sing"	(Non-album single)

=== Remix albums ===
Year	Album	Label
2017	Dreams of Neo-Tokyo	FiXT Music
2017	Awakening With You (Remix Contest Compilation)	FiXT Music
2017	Aphelion (Remix Contest Compilation)	FiXT Music
2017	Neo-Tokyo (Remix Contest Compilation)	FiXT Music
2018	Dreams in Monochrome	FiXT Music
2021	Dreams of Darkness, Visions of Light	FiXT Music

== Members ==
- Klayton as "Red" (2013–present)
- Varien as "Raven" (2013)
