= Celldweller =

American electronic rock project

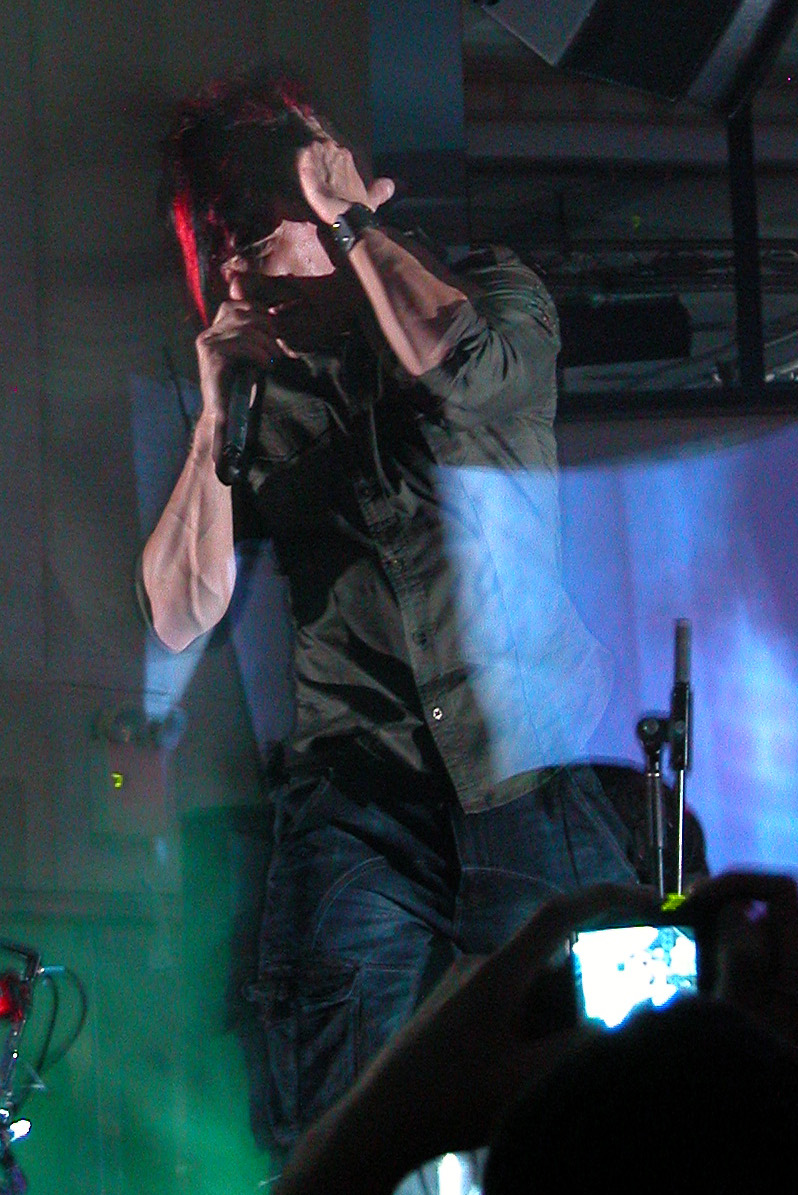
- Klayton in 2010

Background information
- Origin: New York City, U.S.
- Genres: Electronic rock; industrial metal; industrial rock; electronica; nu metal
- Years active: 1999–present
- Labels: Esion; Position; FiXT; Monstercat
- Members: Klayton
- Website: klayton.info

Celldweller is an electronic rock project by American multi-musician Klayton. Celldweller's songs have been featured in many films, movie trailers, television shows and video games.

== Career ==
=== Precursors: Circle of Dust and Angeldust (1992–1999) ===
The name Celldweller was derived from a nickname his mother gave him when he was a teenager, "Cellar Dweller", since he made all of his music in his parents' basement. Klayton had gained a devoted cult following in the mid 90s because of his industrial metal band Circle of Dust. After the dissolution of Circle of Dust, Klayton concurrently released both a posthumous collection of reworked Circle of Dust leftovers titled Disengage and an album for a new project, Angeldust, created in conjunction with illusionist Criss Angel. Both albums demonstrated Klayton's shift away from industrial metal and towards more electronic-modern industrial rock influences, incorporating richer electronic instrumentation and greater emphasis on melody. This change in style was a major step toward the sound that would come to define Celldweller's output. Klayton began creating songs for the Celldweller project in 1998/1999 and released a limited edition EP of three early Celldweller demos and two solo trance tracks, which quickly sold out. Klayton and Chriss Angel parted ways in May of 2000 after three albums' worth of material had been completed, allowing Klayton to devote all of his time to Celldweller.

=== Eponymous debut period (1999–2004) ===
Official Celldweller "cell-block" logo

Klayton worked in earnest with producer Grant Mohrman (formerly of Leaderdogs for the Blind and Full on the Mouth) on the debut Celldweller album, which was slated for release in February 2001. Unfortunately, various delays kept pushing the release date back. During this time, Klayton kept fans up to date with numerous Celldweller Logs through his website and via email and, in 2001, released raw files of the song "Symbiont" to give fans and fellow musicians a chance to remix Celldweller's music. Eight remixes were chosen and uploaded to the original Mp3.com, most of them making it to the top of the Electronic and the Electro-Industrial charts. All the exposure led to over 500,000 song plays on Mp3.com. The "Symbiont" remixes became a digital EP six years later.

The self-titled debut album saw release in early 2003 and debuted at No. 17 on Billboard's Internet Sales Chart. Celldweller included a guest appearance by Taproot drummer Jarrod Montague. In 2004, the album took home seven awards at the Just Plain Folks Music Awards, winning Album of the Year, Producer of the Year, Industrial Album of the Year, Metal Song of the Year ("One Good Reason") and Best Industrial Rock Song ("Switchback"), and also took runner-up in Best Industrial Song with "Stay with Me (Unlikely)" and Best Rock Song with "I Believe You". Later, the songs "Birthright" and "Switchback" were included in the list of Hard and Extreme Mode songs respectively for the popular iPhone OS game Tap Tap Revenge.

In 2004, Klayton put together a double disc release called The Beta Cessions. The first disc contained a re-recording of the last Circle of Dust song, "Goodbye", alternate mixes of "Switchback", the Klayton tracks from the initial Celldweller EP, and demo versions of debut Celldweller songs. The second disc contained the full debut album in instrumental form, with a few of the instrumentals being slightly edited. Klayton stated that he plans to release Beta Cessions to coincide with each of his major albums to collect outtakes, demos, and other rarities.

In the years following the release of the first Celldweller album, various remix EPs were released, culminating in the conception of the Take It & Break It Celldweller Remix Competition in 2006. Expanded off the fan remix concept that Klayton first toyed with in 2001 with the Symbiont remixes, the Take It & Break It competition saw the creation of its own website on which unlimited numbers of fans could register, download and remix the individual recording files of various Celldweller songs, and then submit their remixes. Three rounds of the competition were completed, with compilations of Celldweller remixes being released at the end of each round. In 2008, the Celldweller Remix Competition evolved into the FiXT Remix Competition where fans, remixers, and musicians have the opportunity to remix songs of not only Celldweller but other FiXT Music artists as well.

In December 2008, Klayton released Soundtrack for the Voices in My Head Vol. 01, a collection consisting primarily of short, instrumental score-based compositions. He selected and reworked demos from his extensive archives that he felt would suit for film, TV and video game licensing. Additionally, some songs were from the (then work in progress) second main Celldweller album sessions. Celldweller's management has sought to have these songs placed in media, like those on the debut album, and several have already been heard on film and television and in video games.

=== Wish Upon a Blackstar period (2004–2012) ===
Writing and recording for the second Celldweller album has been underway since 2004. Originally slated to come out in the summer of 2006, the album has been delayed numerous times. In March 2009, Klayton announced that the title of the album is Wish Upon a Blackstar. Of 50 songs, he has narrowed it down to the 10 that will comprise the album. In a blog post on his website, he elaborated on wanting to release the album in "Chapters" with each Chapter consisting of two songs.

In April 2009, Klayton revealed the tracks Wish Upon a Blackstar would contain, and has also stated that many of the leftovers will be on the second volume of The Beta Cessions.

Textlogo

During the recording of Wish Upon a Blackstar, Klayton also began work on his follow-up to Soundtrack for the Voices in My Head Vol. 01 (SVH). Soundtrack for the Voices in My Head Vol. 02 will be released in the same manner as Wish Upon a Blackstar: as handfuls of tracks are completed, Chapters of the full album will be released digitally until the full collection is complete and the album is released on physical media. Chapter 01 of SVH Vol. 02 featured four songs, including a 20-minute ambient piece titled "Adrift on Celestial Seas" (a first for Celldweller). Additionally, a Limited Edition CD of Chapter 01 was released on December 7, 2010 that contained a bonus short ambient track, "Distants".

In addition to working on Wish Upon a Blackstar and SVH Vol. 02, Celldweller kept busy on other fronts. He produced the remainder of the debut Blue Stahli album, appeared on the soundtrack of the Xbox 360/PlayStation 3 game Dead Rising 2 with a new original song, "Kill the Sound", as well as a selection of previously released Celldweller songs, and also remixed songs for BT and JES.

Klayton confirmed in April 2010 that, for the first time in five years, he would be taking Celldweller on the road. The live band would consist of Klayton and fellow FiXT recording artist Blue Stahli. The first leg of the tour, in the fall of 2010, included shows at Triton Fest in New York City, Dragoncon in Atlanta, Georgia, and EBM Fest in Toronto. In November 2010, Klayton announced that he is planning to release studio recordings of the alternate live versions of Celldweller songs played on the tour. The first of these releases, Cellout EP 01, is available as an iTunes exclusive, released on January 25, 2011.

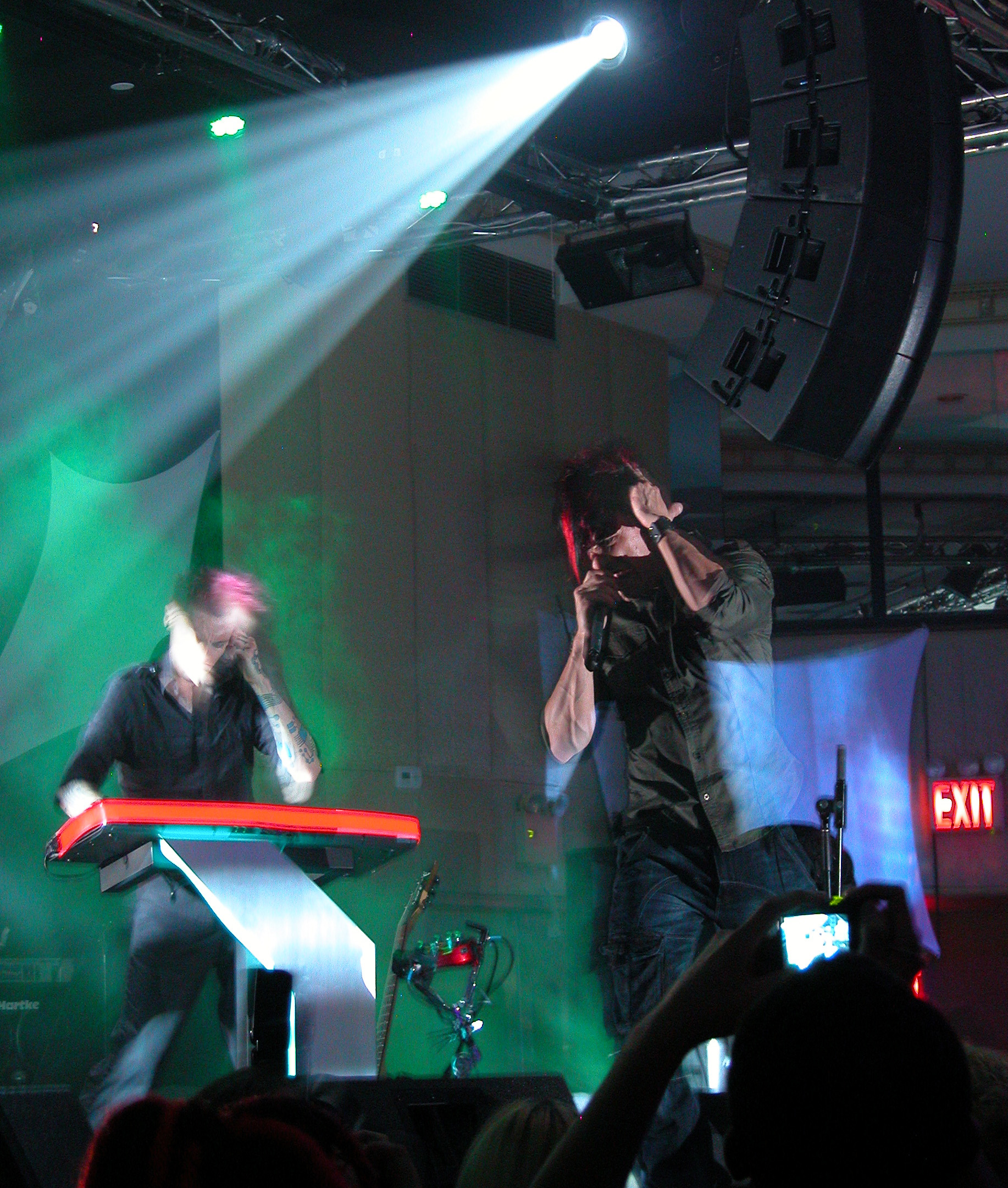
Celldweller performing in 2010

On May 4, 2011, a four-EP bundle was released via Groupees in a 72-hour only exclusive online sale with 20% of the benefits going to Red Cross for Tornado Relief. The EPs in the promotion were Cellout EP 01, Chapter 01 of Soundtrack for the Voices in My Head Vol. 02, Chapter 03 of Wish Upon a Blackstar and the Unreleased EP which contained previously unreleased songs and remixes including a song titled "Senorita Bonita" from the Chapter 02 of SVH Vol. 02 and a Beta Cessions demo, "Atmospheric Light".

In May 2011, in a Ustream broadcast Klayton mentioned that he was planning to launch a Celldweller VIP Membership, which would give "access to unreleased demos, video, news, discounts & more". It was to be launched in "early/mid July", 2011.

On November 24, 2011, Klayton announced that he is planning to release Wish Upon a Blackstar on March 27, 2012.

Chapter 02 of Soundtrack for the Voices in My Head Vol. 02 was released on February 14, 2012 and pre-orders of Live Upon a Blackstar began on the same day along with an announcement about the delay of Wish Upon a Blackstar to May 22, 2012. On March 2, 2012, Klayton released a new SVH song, "Elara" as a single.

The MP3 Album version of Live Upon a Blackstar was released on March 26, 2012, one day early. However, the Live Upon a Blackstar Blu-ray DVD was delayed to April 17, 2012 and was delayed again, to May 22, 2012. The release date of Wish Upon a Blackstar was also moved.

On May 22, 2012, the Live Upon a Blackstar DVD/Blu-ray was delayed to June 12, 2012.

On June 12, 2012, Wish Upon a Blackstar was released alongside the Live Upon a Blackstar Blu-ray DVD. The next day, Klayton released a new SVH Vol. 02 song as a single and he also announced the release date of July 24, 2012 for the full Soundtrack for the Voices in My Head Vol. 02 album. On July 16, 2012, a new vocal song titled "Tough Guy" was released for free download on Dubstep.net. Klayton stated that this song is "towards the next Celldweller album".

On September 14, 2012, a new Klash-Up, "Miss Murder's Personal Jesus" was premiered Alternative Press's website. It contains elements of AFI's "Miss murder" and Depeche Mode's "Personal Jesus". On October 19, 2012, another Klash-Up titled "Cry Little Sister Vs. Hello Zepp" was released on Bloody Disgusting's website. It contains elements of Gerard McMahon's "Cry Little Sister" and "Hello Zepp" from Saw.

On October 22, 2012, Klayton announced International Tour, including shows in Estonia, Latvia, Russia and Ukraine.

On October 26, 2012, Celldweller launched another Groupees campaign, selling Soundtrack for the Voices in My Head Vol. 1 and Vol. 2, Live Upon a Blackstar, Wish Upon a Blackstar, The Complete Cellout as well as offering the Live Upon a Blackstar DVD for digital download with a portion of all the sales were donated to the Children's Defense Fund. Through the campaign, donors unlocked a new 3-song Unreleased EP 2 with demo songs that were intended for Wish Upon a Blackstar.

On December 11, 2012, the Space & Time EP was released containing remixes of various songs from Wish Upon a Blackstar.

=== Blackstar and End of an Empire (2013–2015) ===
On the February 11, 2013, which marked the 10th anniversary of the release of his debut album, Klayton announced that he was working on a re-issue of the debut album, along with a two-disc Deluxe Edition due out in May. The finished version of the unreleased song, "Uncrowned", was also released with the re-issue. It was originally written for the debut album, but never made it on there. The re-issue also contains remastered versions of the tracks released during the Groupees promotions, alongside never heard before tracks. On May 1, 2013, Klayton posted an announcement video on his social networking pages that the re-issue of his debut album was available for pre-order from the FiXT website. The re-issue was released on June 10, 2013, one day before the original release date.

On March 29, 2013, he released a previously unreleased song entitled "Younger", featuring Kenzie as a free download. The song was written approximately four years ago.

On June 25, 2013, The Complete Cellout Vol. 01 Instrumentals was released, containing instrumental versions of the songs from The Complete Cellout Vol. 01.

Klayton programmed four tracks on the I See Stars album New Demons, and composed music for the video game Dead Rising 3. Klayton also released two songs with James Dooley, entitled "Black Sun" and "Rise from the Underworld". "Black Sun" appeared in the film I, Frankenstein.

Klayton announced, in February 2013, that he would be publishing a new novel, titled Blackstar, based upon/inspired by his album Wish Upon a Blackstar. The novel was being written by five-time award-winning author Josh Viola (director of the "Unshakeable" music video) of The Bane of Yoto and renowned author Keith Ferrell of Bloodmoon: Birth of the Beast. The first act was released on December 3, 2013.

Soundtrack for the Voices in My Head Vol. 03 was also announced on his Facebook. Chapter 01 of SVH Vol. 03 was revealed by The Orchard. It was released earlier exclusively on iTunes on July 2, 2013. On other online stores, including FiXT Store, it was released on July 16, 2013.

Klayton also announced a new project with music producer Varien, called Scandroid. A website was created with a preview of a new song. The full song, "Salvation Code", was released on August 6, 2013.

On August 23, 2013, Celldweller posted an image of him and what he described on the post as a set for a music video shoot. The song it is for is currently unknown, but details about the video were posted a day later, with an image of a forest and with a quote "I am here shooting a Celldweller music video (feat @bluestahli.)" with Blue Stahli playing a guest role in the video, and in another post, that they are wearing space suits in the woods. In a post on the next day after that, he commented to say that he and Blue Stahli are celebrating the wrap of the music video, along with "#theluckyones", possibly meaning that the song will be "The Lucky One".

On November 22, 2013, Celldweller released Zombie Killer, an EP consisting of the tracks he composed for the official soundtrack of Dead Rising 3.

On December 6, 2013, Celldweller released the official music video to "Unshakable" a week earlier to its initial release date due to fans making over 100 reviews on Blackstar's Ebook and score on iTunes and Amazon. On January 5, 2014, he released a short song called "Snowcore" on his SoundCloud page.

In February 2014, Celldweller announced the Sonix Producer Pack Vol. I, which features sounds that Klayton created for music production. It was released to the public on February 11, 2014.

The second act of Blackstar, Blackstar Act Two: Awakening, was released on June 3, 2014, along with its score.

On March 18, 2014, he announced another album coming some time in 2014. He also stated that the next album will be released in a series of chapters, similar to his previous feature album Wish Upon a Blackstar. On August 13, 2014, the new album title was announced and is End of an Empire. Its first chapter, Time, was released on September 16, 2014.

In August 2015, Celldweller was announced to be composing the soundtrack to Killer Instinct: Season Three, scheduled for release on March 29, 2016, alongside Atlas Plug.

On September 2, 2015, Celldweller announced the release date of the final End of an Empire album, November 6, 2015.

=== Space and Time and Offworld (2016–2017) ===
On April 12, 2016, Celldweller released an album containing remixes of his 2012 extended play Space & Time. Most remixes were produced by popular electronic music artists such as KJ Sawka, Zardonic and Katfyr among others.

The fourth full-length vocal album (and seventh overall album), Offworld, was released on July 28, 2017, containing 11 songs (one is a remix of "Awakening With You" by Ulrich Schnauss). The songs are in contrast to the project's aggressive guitars and beats, containing lighter variations of instruments and slower tempos. It peaked on Billboard's Heatseekers Albums chart at no. 17, and Billboard's Independent Albums at no. 35.

=== Satellites (2019–2024) ===
On February 20, 2019, Celldweller released a new single from his upcoming fifth studio album, Satellites, called "My Disintegration". The full-length album will include the latest single, "Into the Void" as well, and was scheduled for release in 2020.

On August 23, 2022, Celldweller announced that Satellites would be released on October 14.

=== God Mode (2025–present) ===
In the spring of 2025, Klayton announced that he was working on music for several of his projects, including Celldweller. In October of that year, Klayton revealed that he was finishing work on a new single titled "Fakebreaker" in collaboration with SWARM and REEBZ, to be released on October 29. The single was released with an accompanying music video. Klayton also revealed that "Fakebreaker" would be included on a new Celldweller EP titled God Mode, featuring gaming-inspired music. On January 30, 2026, Klayton announced via a YouTube video that God Mode had been changed from an EP to an album, with the second single "Respawn" set for release sometime in the second quarter of 2026. In February 2026, Celldweller was announced to be composing the soundtrack to Legacy of Kain: Ascendance, released on March 31, 2026.

== YouTube ==
Celldweller

YouTube information
- Channel: celldweller
- Years active: 2014–present
- Genres: Documentary; vlogging; music videos
- Subscribers: 259 thousand
- Views: 155.3 million
- Last updated: September 16, 2024

While he has owned a YouTube account since 2006, Klayton started up a YouTube career in 2014 when he started six shows on his YouTube channel.

The show Demo Vault consists of demos that Klayton stored away, with the first release "Klay Out West" on February 28, 2014. On May 30, 2014, he released the first in a series of compilations, Demo Vault Vol. 01. Followed by Demo Vault Vol. 02 on September 5. On October 17, 2014, Klayton released the final episode of Demo Vault, stating that he didn't really run out of material but thinks the rest just isn't good enough to be published.

The show Ask Klayton (formerly Ask Celldweller) is a question & answer show where questions are submitted by fans via comments and video responses. Each episode was previously uploaded every second and fourth Tuesday of the month. They later changed to being uploaded monthly, though the series is now being uploaded more irregularly, in the form of "One Off" uploads.

Cellevision involved Klayton contacting and meeting with other FiXT artists. The episodes were uploaded every first and third Thursday. No episodes have been uploaded since April 5, 2017.

Celldweller Production has him showing off the equipment he uses to make music. The episodes were uploaded every other month, though they are uploaded more infrequently now.

Recording Cessions has him creating, recording and mastering music in his studio. The episodes were uploaded every fourth Thursday, though now they seem to be uploaded before the release of a single or album.

The final show, Transmissions (previously "Because I Can") has Klayton creating experimental tracks with his modular system, like "Snowcore", "A Storm on Saturn", "Metropolitan" and "The Halls of Valhalla", a compilation of these experiments, Transmissions: Vol. 01, was released on December 23, 2014, followed by Volumes 2 and 3 released on May 5, 2015 and May 6, 2016, respectively. Transmissions: Vol 4 was later released August 18, 2017. The Transmissions series was later moved to his FreqGen project.

== Awards ==
The debut Celldweller album won seven awards in the 2004 Just Plain Folks Music Awards:

- Album of the Year – Celldweller
- Producer of the Year – Klayton
- Industrial Album of the Year – Celldweller
- Best Industrial Song – "Switchback" (with "Stay with Me (Unlikely)" in second place)
- Best Metal Song – "One Good Reason"
- 2nd place, Best Rock Song – "I Believe You"
- 4th place, Best Hard rock Song – "Fadeaway"

Celldweller has also won:

- Best Male Vocalist – Klayton (2005 Radio-Active-Music Awards)
- Video Game Score of the Year – Killer Instinct Season 3 (2017 ASCAP Screen Music Awards)

== Live band ==
=== Current members ===
- Klayton – vocals, synthesizers, guitar, bass, percussion, drums, DJ (1999–present)

=== Past live performers ===
- Bret Autrey (Blue Stahli) – backing vocals, synthesizers, guitar, bass, percussion (2010–2013)
- Dale Van Norman – electric guitar, keyboards, percussion, backing vocals (2003–2005)
- Kemikal (Kem Secksdiin) – bass guitar, keyboards, percussion, backing vocals (2003–2005)
- Cais – acoustic and electronic drums, percussion (2003–2005)
- Kenny James – acoustic and electronic drums, percussion (2003–2005)
- Del Cheetah – guitar, keyboards, percussion (2003–2005)
- Chris Cross aka Tweety – guitar, keyboards, percussion (2003–2005)

== Discography ==
Studio albums

- Celldweller (2003)
- Soundtrack for the Voices in My Head Vol. 01 (2008)
- Wish Upon a Blackstar (2012)
- Soundtrack for the Voices in My Head Vol. 02 (2012)
- End of an Empire (2015)
- Soundtrack for the Voices in My Head Vol. 03 (2016)
- Offworld (2017)
- Satellites (2022)
