= Soundtrack for the Voices in My Head Vol. 01 =

Soundtrack for the Voices in My Head: Vol. 01

Studio album by Celldweller
- Released: December 16, 2008
- Recorded: 2006–2007
- Genres: Instrumental rock; electronica; electronic rock; trance; industrial metal
- Length: 58:18
- Label: FiXT Music
- Producer: Klayton

Celldweller chronology
Celldweller (2003)	Soundtrack for the Voices in My Head: Vol. 01 (2008)	Cellout EP 01 (2011)

Singles from Soundtrack for the Voices in My Head: Vol. 01
- 1. "Solaris" Released: July 16, 2025

Professional ratings
Review scores
Source	Rating
Melodic.net	3/5 stars

Soundtrack for the Voices in My Head: Vol. 01 is the second studio album by the American electronic rock project Celldweller. It is the first album in the instrumental SVH series.

== Background and production ==
While chronologically Soundtrack for the Voices in My Head Vol. 01 is the second studio album by Celldweller, it is not the second main Celldweller album; instead, the album is more of a side project. When asked about whether SVH 01 is a second Beta Cessions release, Klayton replied that "[he] wanted to be sure that SVH 01 was a separate entity from the Beta Cessions material"

SVH 01 is a production based album intended for film, TV, and video game licensing. The album contains songs which were culled from the hundreds of demos in Klayton's extensive archives and represented work that he felt was not suited for a premier Celldweller album but rather for theatrical use. Also, some songs were from the then work in progress and unnamed second main album sessions. The songs "Birthright (Beta 1.0)", "Narrow Escape" and "Through the Gates" are known to be from the sessions.

According to Klayton, "La Puerta Del Diablo" was inspired by a trip to the place of the same name in El Salvador.

== Release ==
On October 28, 2008, 15 tracks from the album were released for free on Celldweller's True Anthem Widget and the album was made available for pre-order at FiXT Store. On December 16, 2008, the album was released for download and physical CD.

Following the success of the album, the instrumentals "Through the Gates" and "Ursa Minor" were added to Celldweller's live shows. Additionally, the final version of "Birthright" which was updated with more production, was re-released on Wish Upon a Blackstar.

== Track listing ==
No.	Title	Length
1.	"Through the Gates"	1:35
2.	"Birthright" (Beta 1.0)	5:16
3.	"Solaris"	4:17
4.	"Pursuit of the Hunted"	1:52
5.	"Ursa Minor" (Electron Mix)	1:48
6.	"Narrow Escape"	2:03
7.	"Subterra"	1:29
8.	"The Angel of iO"	5:22
9.	"Surgical"	1:42
10.	"Ursa Minor" (Proton Mix)	1:44
11.	"Outland"	3:21
12.	"Life's a Glitch"	0:14
13.	"Animatronic"	1:45
14.	"Descent"	1:45
15.	"Ursa Minor" (Neutron Mix)	1:44
16.	"Birthright" (Birthwrong Remix by Blue Stahli)	2:30
17.	"Scardonia"	2:04
18.	"Aurora Borealis"	2:19
19.	"Ursa Minor" (Non-Atomic Mix)	1:42
20.	"La Puerta del Diablo"	3:16
21.	"Birthright" (Beta 1.0 - Instrumental Trailer Mix)	5:16
22.	"Baseline" (Birthright Demo - Instrumental)	5:14
Total length:		58:18

== Licensing ==
Most of the songs from Soundtrack for the Voices in My Head Vol. 01 have been licensed for film, TV, and video games and have also been used in Celldweller video clips on the Celldweller YouTube channel.

- "Through the Gates" has been licensed for the trailers of Lion's Gate's Daybreakers, for Activision's racing game, Baja 1000, for Gameloft's racing game Asphalt 8: Airborne (as menu music) and also for MTV's The Hills, Fox's American Idol and SyFy's WCG Ultimate Gamer.
- "Birthright (Beta 1.0)" has been licensed for trailers of Disney's Race to Witch Mountain, Marvel/Paramount's Iron Man, Warner Bros.' Speed Racer, Columbia/Sony's Spider-Man 3 and The Weinstein Company's The Last Legion.
- "Solaris" has been licensed for trailers of Lion's Gate's The Spirit, Microsoft's racing game Forza Motorsport 3 and SyFy's WCG Ultimate Gamer.
- "Pursuit of the Hunted" has been licensed for SyFy's WCG Ultimate Gamer.
- "Ursa Minor" has been licensed for trailers of Warner Bros.' Ninja Assassin, Touchstone Picture's Surrogates, 20th Century Fox's X-Men Trilogy and also for Ubisoft's video game, Tom Clancy's H.A.W.X. 2
- "Narrow Escape" has been used in the video game Dead Rising 2.
- "Subterra" has been licensed for trailers of Safehouse Pictures' The Bleeding
- "Animatronic" has been licensed for trailers of Columbia's Premium Rush and Lion's Gate's More Than a Game
