= Klayton =

American musician (born 1969)

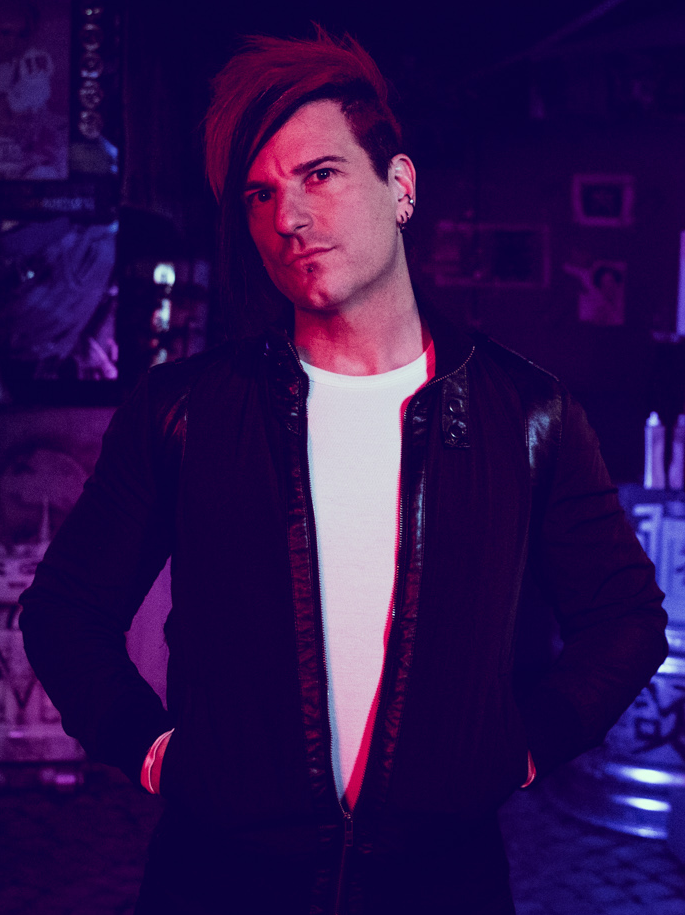
- Klayton in 2016

Background information
- Also known as: Celldweller, Klay Scott, Red, Dred, Deathwish, Tox
- Born: Scott David Albert; June 17, 1969 (age 57); Bethpage, New York, U.S.
- Genres: Electronic rock; industrial rock; industrial metal; nu metal; drum and bass; electronica
- Occupations: Musician; composer; producer
- Instruments: Vocals; guitar; synthesizer; bass; percussion; drums; sampler; turntables; programming
- Years active: 1987–present
- Label: FiXT
- Member of: Circle of Dust; Celldweller; Scandroid; Brainchild; FreqGen
- Formerly of: Argyle Park; Angeldust; Immortal
- Website: klayton.info

Klayton (born Scott David Albert; June 17, 1969) is an American multi-instrumentalist and singer based in Los Angeles, California. He has led several electronic/industrial bands and has performed under a variety of stage names since the early 1990s. His current projects are Celldweller, Scandroid, Circle of Dust and FreqGen.

== Early life ==
Albert grew up in an Italian-American conservative Christian household in New York, where he attended church with his younger brother Dan and friends Buka and Klank (who would collaborate with him on a number of future music projects). Albert never had formal training on an instrument, instead picking up whatever interested him and learning it himself. He graduated from Farmingdale High School. He took one semester of music theory in college but dropped out, explaining that "all they wanted to tell me is what I could and couldn't do according to the laws of music and I couldn't have cared less." He eventually led to characterizing himself as being a "jack of all trades, master of none" when it came to musical instruments. The first of these instruments was the drums.

== Music career ==
=== Immortal (late 1980s) ===
Immortal was a speed/thrash metal band that put out one demo cassette in the late 1980s. It was this cassette that got the attention of R.E.X. Records, who would later sign Klayton's band Circle of Dust. Dan (lvl) was also a member of Immortal.

=== Circle of Dust, Brainchild, and Argyle Park (1990–present) ===
Klayton's primary band throughout the 1990s was Circle of Dust, an industrial metal outfit he formed in 1990. Circle of Dust got signed to R.E.X. Records, a small label that concerned itself primarily with underground Christian metal in the late 1980s and early 1990s. Despite heavy touring and some notable success in the underground industrial metal scene, Circle of Dust released only two proper albums, those being a self-titled debut in 1992 and a posthumous collection called Disengage in 1998. In between the times of those releases, Klayton created two notable side projects under various aliases and with various collaborators. The first of these was Brainchild, formed with the president of R.E.X. Records, Doug Mann. The only Brainchild album, Mindwarp, was released shortly after the debut Circle of Dust album in 1992 and featured even heavier thrash metal influences. Later, in 1994, the Mindwarp album was re-issued as a Circle of Dust album titled Brainchild to take advantage of a new distribution deal R.E.X. had signed without having to write and record a new album. That same year, Klayton co-formed, along with the mysterious musician Buka, the supergroup Argyle Park, arguably the most controversial Christian industrial metal band in the short history of the genre. Argyle Park produced one album, Misguided, which was released to both high acclaim and heavy criticism in 1995 and featured a number of collaborators from mainstream industrial rock bands and Christian rock bands alike. 1995 would prove to be a busy and chaotic year for Klayton; he toured and released a complete re-recording of the self-titled Circle of Dust album while R.E.X., it turned out, was losing its distribution deal. This caused the label, who refused to release any of their signed bands from contract, to slide into bankruptcy. Essentially, Circle of Dust was trapped on a sinking ship, unable to record and release new music but also prevented from signing to any other label. Later that year, Klayton decided to end Circle of Dust and find new means of creating and releasing music.

It wasn't until early 2016 that Klayton bought the rights to his Circle of Dust music back from the record company it was owned by, and began remastering and re-releasing all of those albums, including the ones from Brainchild and Argyle Park. In the deluxe remastered versions of those albums he added new Circle of Dust singles, which later became part of a brand new album, Machines of Our Disgrace, which Klayton says showcases what Circle of Dust would sound like in the modern day.

=== Angeldust (1995–2000) ===
While Circle of Dust was touring in 1994/1995, Klayton had been contacted on a number of occasions by illusionist Criss Angel, who wanted to collaborate on a magic show. When R.E.X.'s legal troubles prevented Klayton from recording or touring in 1995, he put the band to rest and began writing with Angel. The two combined their names and called the band Angeldust and spent upwards of two years creating a live theatrical show that would feature "Illusions, a live band, avant-garde characters that roam the landscape, robotic lighting, television monitors and projectors, performance art pieces and more." They released their first album, Musical Conjurings from the World of Illusion, in 1998, the same year as the final Circle of Dust album. However, by 2000, all mention of Klayton had been erased from the Criss Angel website and a complete trilogy of albums, including a re-issue of the first album, were released only under the name Criss Angel as the extended soundtrack for his Amystika show. Klayton later explained that it had become apparent to the two that they were better off working on their own projects. Several years later, however, it appeared that the two had made amends, as Klayton recorded and remixed a new theme song for Angel's Mindfreak show in 2006. This collaboration represents Klayton's final contribution to the discography of Criss Angel.

=== Celldweller (1999–present) ===
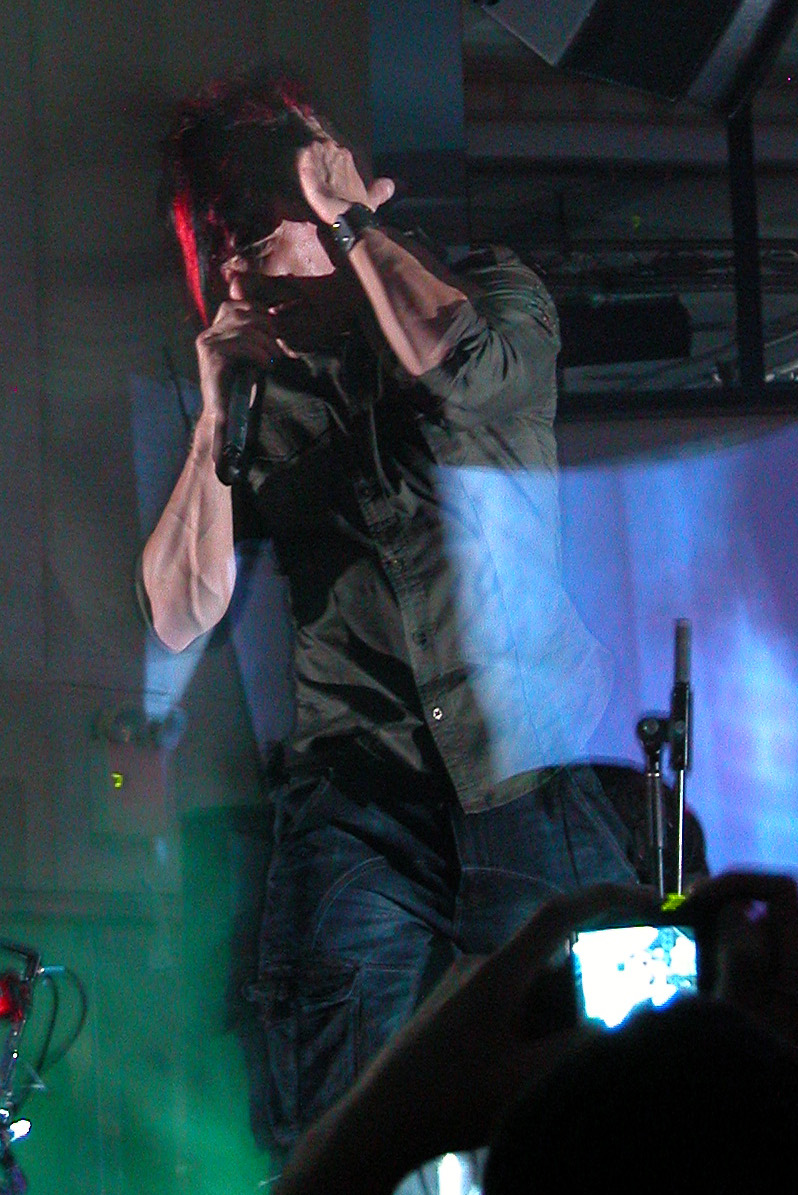
Klayton performing as Celldweller in 2010

Klayton, previously having used Celldweller only as an occasional production moniker, turned the entity into a full-fledged solo band after parting ways with Criss Angel in 1999 and released a five-song limited edition teaser EP that same year. Interest ran high, with several Celldweller demo songs and remixes earning high marks on the charts on the old Mp3.com. A number of setbacks, including attempts to find backing by a major label that fell through, caused the debut eponymous Celldweller album to be delayed by two years. It was independently released in 2003 and has made a number of achievements such as reaching the 17th spot on Billboard's Internet Sales Chart, winning a number of 2004 Just Plain Folks Music Awards, and having every track present on the album being licensed to appear in movie trailers, television shows, or computer games, a feat only previously accomplished by Moby and Crystal Method.

In 2008, Celldweller released Soundtrack for the Voices in My Head Vol. 01, a collection of works that Klayton felt were more apt for theatrical use than main album material. Some of these tracks have now been licensed to media, and additional volumes are expected to appear in the future. Klayton has been working on the second Celldweller album, Wish Upon a Blackstar, for the past four or five years and recently announced the release method, which involves publishing the album digitally in chapters of two songs each over time as he finishes the songs in the studio. This approach is tailored to the "post-album" atmosphere of the modern music industry, and parallels similar movements by such high-profile artists as The Smashing Pumpkins.

Klayton has also produced a number of songs and albums for similar artists since starting Celldweller, most notably appearing on AP2, the resurrection of Argyle Park, on Tooth & Nail Records in 2000. Klayton wrote two songs for the album, while LVL wrote the bulk of the album.

=== Scandroid (2013–present) ===
Starting on July 24, 2013, Klayton, via his Celldweller social pages, began posting quotes and links to the video titled "What is the Salvation Code?", which revealed a skull-like logo had been posted around July 17, hinting this upcoming project. Later, he posted a new link to the website SalvationCode.com, requiring a password that was hinted on the video posted previously, which turned out to be "2513", the four final digits of the date at the end of the video. After entering the password, the next page contained a video that had an extended preview of the unreleased song that had been heard on the previous video, both videos of which hinted that the date, August 6, 2013, will be the date that the full song titled "Salvation Code" will be released.

Also on the latest video, several images were displayed; one of which was of Klayton on the left, and who was believed to be Varien, an electronica artist, and another image being a possible official artwork of the upcoming single. The second video was later uploaded on July 30, 2013, along with Klayton making a post on both his and the new Scandroid social pages to confirm that the project will consist of both him and Varien, who had made the same post. The post also stated that the Scandroid music will consist of elements of 1980s retro and electronic music with what they described as a "Neo-Tokyo" theme.

Shortly after the releases of their first two singles, Varien left the project, resulting in Scandroid currently being managed only by Klayton.

On November 11, 2016, Scandroid debuted a full-length, self-titled album, featuring all the singles released prior (including the two with Varien on the project), and continuing the futuristic Tokyo theme, though changing the specific year of the story from "2513" to "2517".

On March 31, 2017, a remix album titled Dreams of Neo-Tokyo was released, which featured remixes of the ten vocal tracks from the Scandroid album.

A second full-length album, Monochrome, was released on October 27, 2017.

The Darkness was released on December 4, 2018, and a companion album titled The Light was released on December 13, 2019.

=== FiXT (media company) ===
Klayton and his manager had formed Esion Media to release the first Celldweller album themselves, and after the success of that album, Klayton morphed Esion into an all new independent record label, FiXT. FiXT grew quickly over the following few years and now features an extensive online store that distributes artists, including Blue Stahli, signed to both FiXT itself and to a variety of other independent record labels. FiXT has branched into the world of literary publication with two award-winning science fiction novels called The Bane of Yoto. In early 2013, Klayton announced FiXT would be publishing a novel by Josh Viola called Blackstar, which is based on Klayton's Wish Upon a Blackstar album. FiXT also sells digital art packs, original clothing designs, and other merchandise related to the music and artistic concepts of FiXT-associated artists. Until late 2012, FiXT also sponsored and hosted remix contests in which fans were provided original recordings and tracks ("stems") of songs by FiXT artists to create and submit their own remixes; winners were awarded prizes including FiXT merchandise, artwork, and music production software. FiXT Remix was discontinued due to mounting expenses and the difficulty of maintenance and development.

== Artistry ==
=== Influences and musical style ===
In his teenage years, Klayton listened to a lot of metal, only later being introduced to electronic music through bands such as Depeche Mode and Skinny Puppy. All of these would influence his musical output in the early and mid-1990s, as he melded heavy guitars with layered samples and synths in the handful of industrial metal bands that he formed. In later years, Klayton has referenced European drum 'n' bass and Goa/psychedelic trance as influential on the sound of his project Celldweller.

Though Klayton's numerous projects in the early and mid-1990s were signed to Christian record labels and are generally considered Christian bands, Klayton took great pains to distance himself from that distinction and that subculture in the later 1990s by splitting from the CCM industry and forgoing any further performances at Christian venues. He described this move and the reasoning behind it to great length in a 1998 interview with Christian metal publication HM Magazine and has reiterated his stance in more recent Celldweller interviews.

=== Stage names ===
Klayton appeared under a number of pseudonyms during the 1990s before settling on the moniker Klayton in 1999. He used his birth name, Scott Albert, for Immortal and for Circle of Dust through their touring years, up until 1995. For the Brainchild side project, Klayton used the alias Tox. Brainchild also gave rise to the handle of Celldweller; an outtake of the album, "Heldweller", appeared on a compilation in 1993 and friends of Klayton twisted the title into "Celldweller", applying it to Klayton with the explanation that he spent all his time in his basement, like a prisoner, working on music. For Argyle Park, Klayton appeared as two fictitious band members, Dred and Deathwish, and also used the Celldweller moniker for the first time as the name of the album's producer. Again, in 1996, Klayton appeared on a tribute to Stryper under the slightly altered name Cell Dweller.

By 1998, when Klayton had begun working with Criss Angel, he had changed his name from Scott Albert to Klay Scott, explaining in an interview that the name had been given to him by Angel for his ability to "take sounds and shape them as if they were clay". He appeared as Klay Scott on the Angeldust/Criss Angel Amystika releases and on the posthumous Circle of Dust album Disengage. At this stage he also stated he was done with pseudonyms, preferring to establish one identity under which all of his music projects took shape. However, despite this, Klay's name would change once more by 1999, when he made Celldweller his sole musical output. The simple name of Klayton has stuck ever since, with the artist restating in newer interviews that he was done experimenting with musical personas and does not want to confuse his fans any longer: "I've been so guilty of doing a million side projects. I've changed my name on every one of them. It's got to the point when my own fans didn't know whether I worked on an album or not." In a January 2016 question-and-answer video, Klayton explained that "Klayton" is his legal name, and that he thus no longer answers to the name Scott Albert.

== Personal life ==
Klayton changed his name in 1998. He has repeatedly stated that he is a fan of Godzilla and the Kaiju genre in general. In an interview with Bloody Disgusting, he said that David Fincher's audio commentary on the films Seven and Fight Club inspired him to record his own audio commentaries for his Beta Cession releases for Wish Upon a Blackstar.

In September 2017, Klayton posted his wedding picture on Facebook. He has three sons.

== Discography ==
=== Justified Rebellion ===
- No Excuses (1988, independent)

=== Immortal ===
- Dead & Buried (1990, independent)

=== Circle of Dust ===
- Circle of Dust (1992, R.E.X. Records)
- Metamorphosis (1993, R.E.X. Records)
- Brainchild (1994, R.E.X. Records)
- Circle of Dust (1995, R.E.X. Records)
- Disengage (1998, Flying Tart Records)
- Machines of Our Disgrace (2016, FiXT)
- alt_Machines (2018, FiXT)
- Circle of Dust – Demos & Rarities (2019, FiXT)
- Circle of Dust (25th Anniversary Edition) (2021, FiXT)

=== Brainchild ===
- Mindwarp (1992, R.E.X. Records)

=== Argyle Park/AP2 ===
- Misguided (1994, R.E.X. Records)
- Suspension of Disbelief (2000, Tooth & Nail Records)

=== Angeldust ===
- Musical Conjurings from the World of Illusion (1998, APITRAG Records)
- System 1–3 in Trilogy (2000, APITRAG Records)
- Mindfreak (2002, APITRAG Records)
- Supernatural (2003, APITRAG Records)
- Mindfreak: The Official Soundtrack (2006, APITRAG Records)

=== Celldweller ===
- Celldweller (2003, Esion Media)
- Beta Cessions (2005, Esion Media)
- Soundtrack for the Voices in My Head Vol. 01 (2008, FiXT)
- The Complete Cellout (2011, FiXT)
- Wish Upon a Blackstar (2012, FiXT)
- Soundtrack for the Voices in My Head Vol. 02 (2012, FiXT)
- Space & Time (2012, FiXT)
- Demo Vault Vol. 01 (2014, FiXT)
- Demo Vault Vol. 02 (2014, FiXT)
- Blackstar (2015, FiXT)
- End of an Empire (2015, FiXT)
- Soundtrack for the Voices in My Head Vol. 03 (2016, FiXT)
- Killer Instinct Season 3: Original Soundtrack (2016, Microsoft Studios Music)
- Offworld (2017, FiXT)
- Demo Vault Vol. 03 (2018, FiXT)
- Demo Vault (2021, FiXT)
- Demo Vault: Wasteland (2021, FiXT)
- Satellites (2022, FiXT)
- Celldweller (Definitive Edition) (2024, FiXT)

=== FreqGen ===
- Transmissions: Vol. 01 (2014, FiXT)
- Transmissions: Vol. 02 (2015, FiXT)
- Transmissions: Vol. 03 (2016, FiXT)
- Transmissions: Vol. 04 (2017, FiXT)
- Dreaming (2020, FiXT)
- Future 1990s (2022, FiXT)

=== Scandroid ===
- Scandroid (2016, FiXT)
- Dreams of Neo-Tokyo (2017, FiXT)
- Monochrome (2017, FiXT)
- Dreams in Monochrome (2018, FiXT)
- The Darkness and The Light (2020, FiXT)

=== Klayton ===
- Terraform Drums Vol. 01 (2017, FiXT)
- Weapons of War (2018, FiXT/Position Music)
- Weapons of War: The Monster Within (2018, FiXT/Position Music)
- Red Zone (2018, FiXT/Position Music)
- The Dunes (Original Motion Picture Score) (2020, FiXT/Position Music)
- Terraform Drums, Vol II (2018, Position Music)
- Red Zone: Legends (2021, Position Music)
