= FiXT =

American independent media company specializing in electronic music

- Founded: 2006
- Founder: Klayton
- Distributor: FUGA (Virgin Music Group)
- Genre: Electronic rock, electronica, industrial, alternative metal, synthwave
- Country of origin: United States
- Location: Los Angeles, California, U.S.
- Official website: fixtmusic.com

FiXT (pronounced "fixed") is an American independent media company with several divisions including a record label, an online music store, and a film/TV/video game music licensing arm. It was founded and is owned by Klayton, who is known for several electronic music projects.

== History ==
FiXT started in 2006 as an outgrowth of Esion Media, the name under which Klayton published his earliest Celldweller material. After years of trouble with distributors over how to properly handle Celldweller's unique brand of music, Klayton decided to take the same approach to record labels as he did with his music and handle the matter himself.

Some of the first releases on FiXT were remix compilations for Celldweller tracks that were called the Take It & Break It series. The remixes were solicited from fans who could download and remix the song files for free. Out of this series grew FiXT Remix, a separate site that regularly hosts remix contests for artists signed to FiXT or carried in the FiXT Store.

FiXT released a remix EP for the artists lvl, as well a single for ex-Celldweller guitarist Kem Secksdiin's band Subkulture (on which Klayton was featured), and the subsequent remix album for the contest hosted by FiXT Remix. FiXT's first officially signed artist was Blue Stahli, an artist with a similar sound and one-man approach to music as Klayton. Over the next few years FiXT began expanding its record label division by signing more artists, such as Josh Money, Rockman, Atlas Plug, Moonitor & Squarehead.

In June 2012, FiXT branched out into publishing with the release of Josh Viola's five-time award-winning sci-fi/fantasy novel The Bane of Yoto. As Viola began looking for publishers for his novel, he reached out to several bands to use their music on a partnered iOS app that would feature his book in comic book format. In reaching out to Celldweller for music licensing, he got put in touch with FiXT, who published the book.

In August 2012, FiXT hosted a video game-editing contest on YouTube to help promote the release of Celldweller's Soundtrack for the Voices in My Head Vol. 2, by having gamers submit edited footage synced to the song "First Person Shooter".

As part of expansion, FiXT introduced a sublabel, FiXT Neon with focus on synthwave, indie pop, and chillwave.

In July 2021, FiXT announced a company rebrand with FiXT Radium as main label and introduced a new EDM sublabel, FiXT Noir.

== Licensing ==
FiXT distributes and licenses music to a variety of film, TV, and video game projects.

== Artists ==
=== Current FiXT artists ===
- 3FORCE
- Beyond Unbroken
- CANTERVICE
- Coping Method
- Daedric
- DEATH X DESTINY
- ENMY
- Essenger
- Extra Terra
- Fight The Fade
- Fury Weekend
- HIGHSOCIETY
- Izzy Reign
- Klayton
  - Celldweller
  - Circle of Dust^{(also see Argyle Park)}
  - Scandroid
  - FreqGen
- I Will Never Be The Same
- Kodeseven
- Nouveau Arcade
- Nitroverts
- Nutronic
- Raizer
- Signal Void
- Soul Extract
- The Qemists
- The Anix
- The Algorithm
- The Browning
- The Plague
- Void Chapter
- Young Medicine

=== Former FiXT artists ===
- Atlas Plug
- Blue Stahli
- lvl
- SeamlessR
- Varien

=== Subterra Records artists ===
- Sebastian Komor
- Adam Fielding
- Varien
- James Dece
