= List of Christian punk bands =

This is a list of Christian punk bands, which include all notable Christian bands that fall under the category of punk or one of its subgenres, excluding hardcore genres. Christian hardcore bands are listed on the list of Christian hardcore bands.

== Traditional punk rock ==
Christian bands that were part of or draw from traditional punk rock.

- Ballydowse
- Blaster the Rocket Man
- The Dingees
- Five Iron Frenzy
- Flatfoot 56
- Headnoise
- The Kings Kids
- Left Out
- Pocket Change
- Officer Negative
- One Bad Pig
- UnTeachers

== Post-punk and new wave ==
Artists associated with post-punk and new wave in Christian music.

- 4-4-1
- The 77s
- Altar Boys
- Audio Adrenaline
- The Choir
- Crash Rickshaw
- Daniel Amos
- Danielson
- The Deadlines
- Edison Glass
- Jonezetta
- Joy Electric
- Mae
- Ninety Pound Wuss
- Neon Horse
- Queens Club
- Quickflight
- Scaterd Few
- Starflyer 59
- Switchfoot
- Steve Taylor
  - Steve Taylor & The Perfect Foil
- Undercover (early)
- Vector

== Melodic punk and skate punk ==
Melodic punk bands and artists in Christian music.

- 180 Out
- Ace Troubleshooter
- The Almost
- Amber Pacific
- Anberlin
- ATTWN
- Bleach
- Blenderhead
- Capital Lights
- Children 18:3
- The Classic Crime
- Craig's Brother
- Dakoda Motor Co.
- David Crowder Band
- The Deadlines
- Dogwood (fourth album)
- Eisley
- Eleventyseven
- Emery
- Everyday Sunday
- False Idle
- Fighting Jacks
- FM Static
- The Fold
- Forever Changed
- Ghoti Hook
- Halo Friendlies
- Hangnail
- Hawk Nelson (early)
- House of Heroes
- The Huntingtons
- Hyland (band)
- I Am Empire
- Icon for Hire
- Inhabited
- Ivoryline
- Jesse & The Rockers
- Joy Electric
- The Juliana Theory
- Kids in the Way
- Last Tuesday
- Mae
- Krystal Meyers (early)
- MxPx
- Much the Same
- Ninety Pound Wuss
- Number One Gun
- The O.C. Supertones
- PAX217
- Philmont
- Philmore
- Plankeye
- Poor Old Lu
- Queens Club
- Relient K
- Roper
- The Rocket Summer
- Run Kid Run
- Same as Sunday
- Sanctus Real
- Search the City
- Side Walk Slam
- Slick Shoes
- Stellar Kart
- Superchick
- Squad Five-O
- This Beautiful Republic
- The Undecided
- Undercover
- Value Pac
- The W's
- Watashi Wa
- The Wedding

== See also ==
- List of Christian hardcore bands
- List of Christian rock bands
