= Punk ideologies =

Beliefs associated with the punk subculture

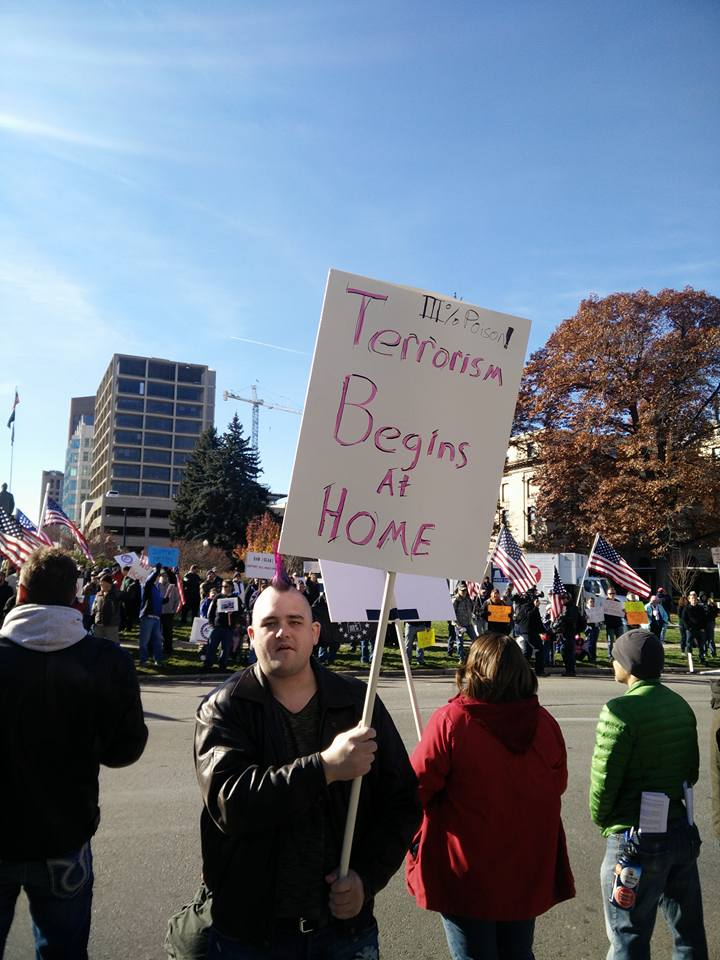
A punk protests against an ACT! for America counter-protest against refugee policy in Boise, Idaho, in November 2015.

Punk ideologies are a group of varied social and political beliefs associated with the punk subculture and punk rock. It is primarily concerned with concepts such as mutual aid, anti-fascism, egalitarianism, decolonization, humanitarianism, direct action; and is opposed to selling out, hierarchy, white supremacy, authoritarianism, eugenics, class and classism, and supports anti-consumerism, anti-corporatism, anti-war, anti-imperialism, anti-globalization, anti-gentrification, anti-racism, anti-sexism, gender equality, anti-homophobia, racial equality, animal rights, freethought and non-conformity. One of its main tenets is the rejection of mainstream, corporate mass culture and its values. It continues to evolve its ideology as the movement spreads throughout North America from its origins in England and New York, embracing a range of anti-racist and anti-sexist belief systems. Punk does not necessarily lend itself to any particular party politics, as it is primarily anti-establishment and often anarchist.

Punk ideologies are usually expressed through punk rock music and lyrics, punk literature such as amateur fanzines, spoken word performances or recordings, punk fashion, or punk visual art. Some punks have participated in direct action, such as protest or demonstration disruption, political violence, ecotage, street barricades, squatting, pirate radio, off-grid energy, graffiti, vandalism and public and business property destruction, and indirect action through counter-propaganda, protests or boycotts. They support and squat in urban and rural collective houses, with group funds held in common. Punk fashion was originally an expression of nonconformity, as well as opposition to both mainstream culture and the status quo. Punk fashion often displays aggression, rebellion, and individualism. Some punks wear accessories, clothing or have tattoos that express sociopolitical messages. They stage Punk Rock Food Drives, such as D.O.A's Unity for Freedom. Punk visual art also often includes political messages. Many punks wear secondhand clothing, partly as an anti-consumerist statement.

An attitude common in the punk subculture is the opposition to selling out, which refers to abandoning of one's values and/or a change in musical style toward pop (e.g. electropop) and embracing mainstream culture or more radio-friendly rock (e.g. pop rock) in exchange for wealth, status, or power. The issue of authenticity is important in the punk subculture—the pejorative term poseur is applied to those who try to associate with punk and adopt its stylistic attributes but are deemed not to share or understand the underlying core values or philosophy.

Because anti-establishment attitudes are such an important part of the punk subculture, a network of independent record labels, venues and distributors has developed. Some punk bands have chosen to break from this independent system and work within the established system of major labels. The do it yourself (DIY) ideal is common in the punk scene, especially in terms of music recording and distribution, concert promotion, and photocopying magazines, posters and flyers. The expression DIY was coined by commentators after the fact.

== Specific ideologies and philosophies ==
The following include some of the most common ideologies and philosophies within the punk subculture (in alphabetical order).

=== Anarchism ===
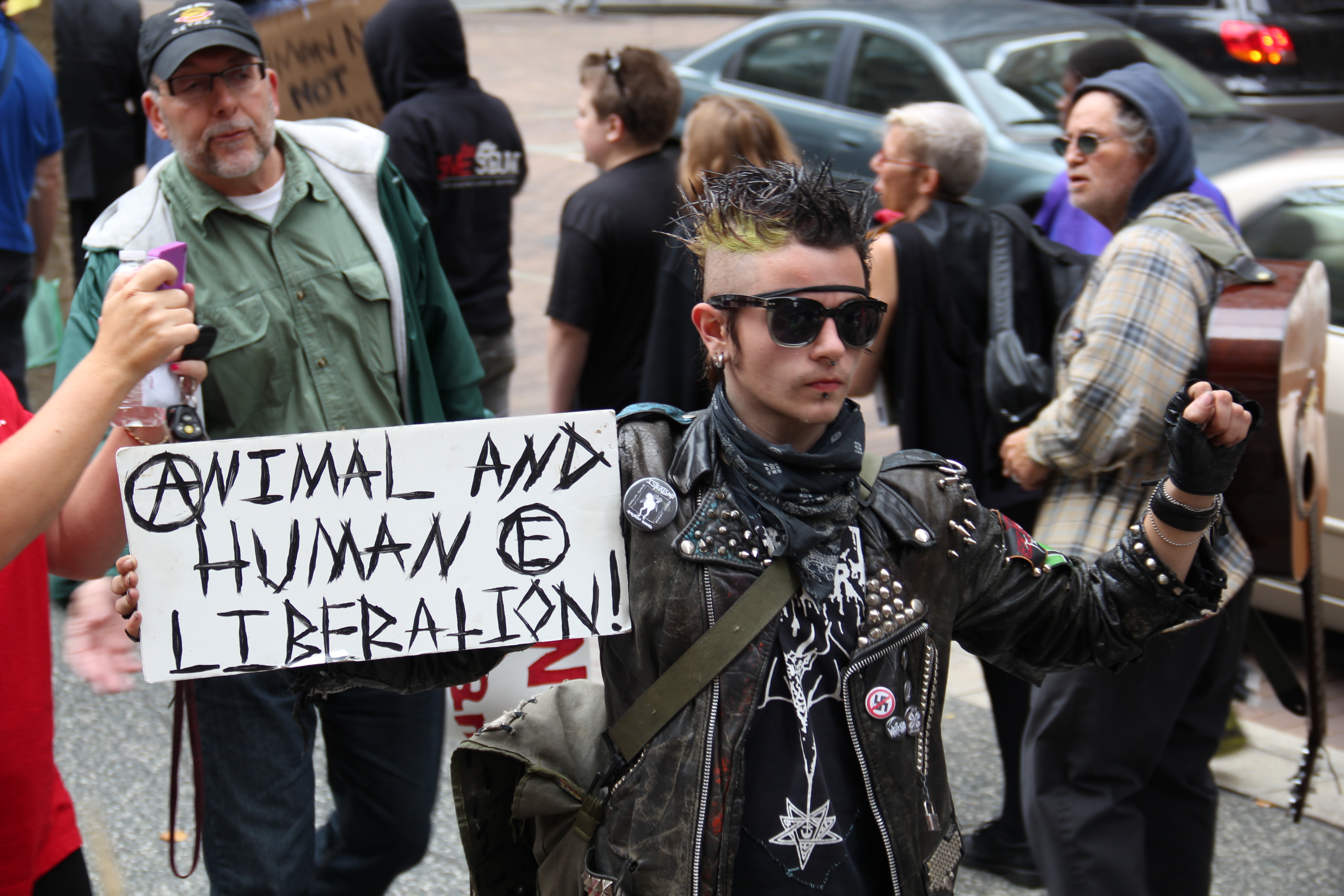
A punk protester of the 2011 Occupy Pittsburgh movement carries a sign incorporating an anarchy symbol.

There is a complex and worldwide underground of punks committed to anarchism as a serious political ideology, sometimes termed "peace punks" or "anarcho-punks." While some well-known punk bands such as the Sex Pistols and The Exploited had songs about anarchy, notably the Pistols' "Anarchy in the UK", they did not embrace anarchism as a disciplined ideology and are not considered part of the anarcho-punk scene.

Anarcho-punks typically believe in direct action. Many anarcho-punks are pacifists (e.g. Crass and Discharge) and therefore believe in using non-violent means of achieving their aims. These include peaceful protest, squatting, applying legal graffiti, culture jamming, ecotage, freeganism, boycotting, civil disobedience, hacktivism and subvertising. Some anarcho-punks believe that violence or property damage is an acceptable way of achieving social change (e.g. Conflict). This manifests itself as rioting, illegal graffiti, vandalism, wire cutting, hunt sabotage, participation in Class War-style activities, melee weapons and in extreme cases, bombings. Notable anarchist punk artists include: Aus-Rotten, Dave Insurgent, Crass, Subhumans, Colin Jerwood, and Dave Dictor.

=== Animal rights and veganism ===
In the 1980s, both straight edge hardcore punk in the United States and anarcho-punk in the United Kingdom started to become associated with animal rights. This association was made possible through activism by bands such as Napalm Death, Icons of Filth, Conflict, and Electro Hippies. Some musicians in these bands were vegans and vegetarians themselves and publicly advocated for these ideologies. In addition to this, bands at the forefront of this movement included lyrical themes pertaining to animal rights, vegetarianism and veganism. Consequently, these ideas became a feature of the punk subculture and this association continues on into the 21st century. A notable example is Jack McGarry of the band SX-70 citing messages of animal rights in lyrics of music he listened to as an influence in becoming vegan. It is additionally evidenced by the prominence of vegan punk events such as Fluff Fest in Europe.

=== Apoliticism ===
Some punks claim to be adherents to apoliticism, such as the band Charged GBH and the singer GG Allin, although some socio-political ideas have appeared in their lyrics. Some Charged GBH songs have discussed social issues, and a few have expressed anti-war views. Allin expressed a vague desire to kill the United States president and destroy the political system in his song "Violence Now". Punk subgenres that are generally apolitical include glam punk, psychobilly, horror punk, punk pathetique, death rock and pop punk. Many of the bands credited with starting the punk movement were decidedly apolitical, including The Dictators, Ramones (which featured staunch conservative Johnny Ramone alongside liberal activist Joey Ramone), New York Dolls, Television, Johnny Thunders' Heartbreakers, and Richard Hell & The Voidoids.

=== Christianity ===
Christian punk is a subgenre of punk rock with some degree of Christian lyrical content. Some Christian punk bands are associated with the Christian music industry, while others reject that association. Ideologies within Christian punk vary, though a number of bands lean towards traditional left-wing politics, most prominently Crashdog, Showbread, Ballydowse and The Psalters, the latter three of whom identified as Christian anarchists. Further examples of notable Christian punk bands include Altar Boys, The Crucified, Five Iron Frenzy, Flatfoot 56, Side Walk Slam, and pop-punk band MxPx, who earned a gold record in 1998.

=== Conservatism ===
A moderate number of punk bands and artists are conservative, rejecting liberalism, communism and socialism in favor of conservatism. Notable conservative punks include Johnny Ramone, Dee Dee Ramone, Cherie Currie, Forgotten Rebels, Rick Ta Life, John Kezdy, Billy Zoom, Exene Cervenka, John Ransom, Joe Escalante, Bobby Steele, Michale Graves, Ross the Boss, Duane Peters, Leonard Graves Phillips, John Knight, Jon Moss, Lee Ving, Klamydia, Dave Smalley, U.S. Chaos, Cro-Mags, and Agnostic Front. John Lydon of the Sex Pistols has also expressed some conservative views as early as the 1980s. Same used to go to M Shadows of Avenged Sevenfold. During the 1980 United States presidential election, Iggy Pop became a vocal supporter of Ronald Reagan. Ian Curtis of the post-punk quartet Joy Division was a loyal Conservative voter who not only voted for Margaret Thatcher in 1979 but persuaded the Liberal candidate to give him a lift to the polling station to do so.

Some Christian punk and hardcore bands have conservative political stances, in particular some of the NYHC bands.

=== Environmentalism ===
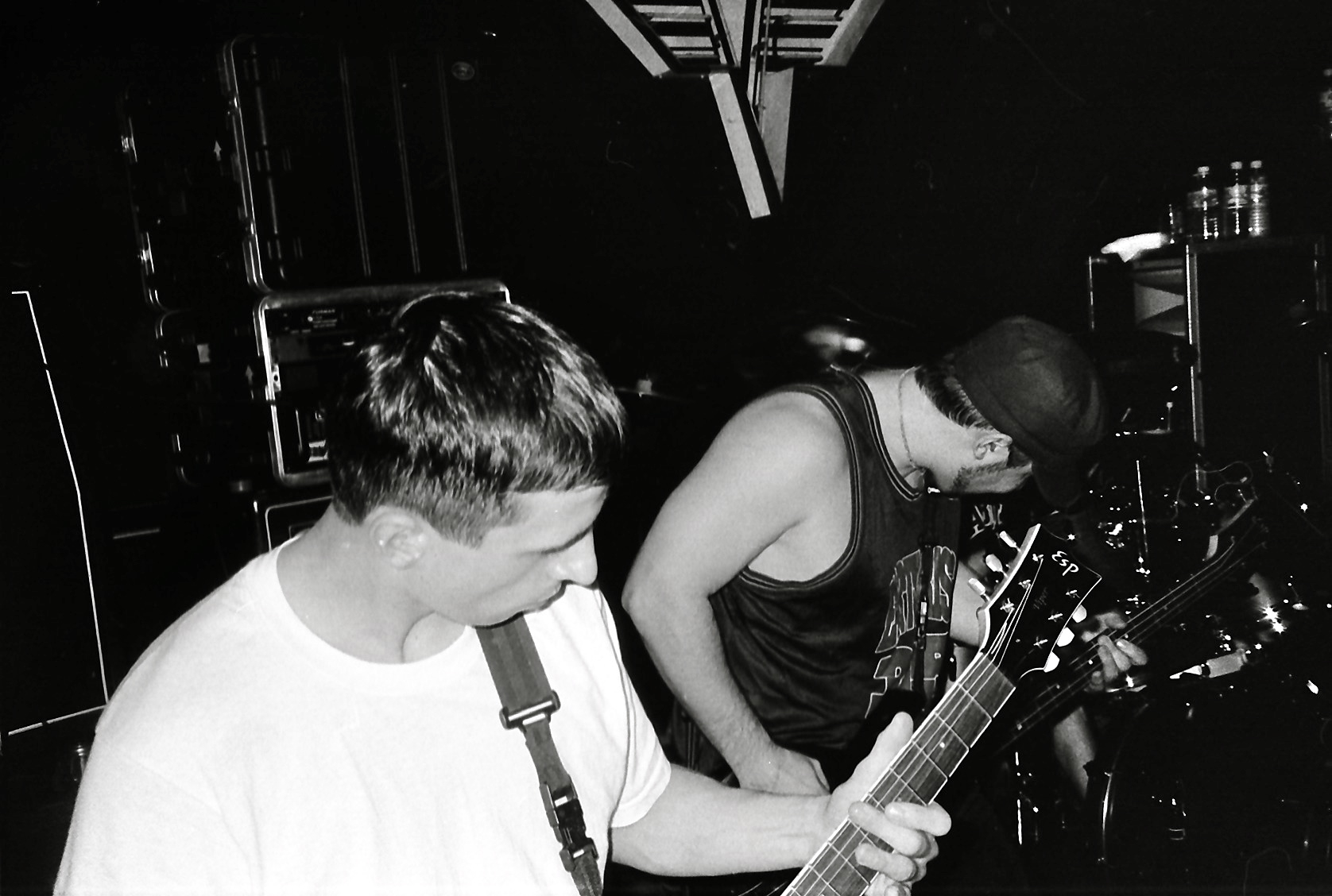
Straight edge hardcore punk group Earth Crisis performing in 1998

Punk rock is a genre with numerous political ideologies, including environmentalism. Poly Styrene and X-Ray Spex explored pollution on "The Day the World Turned Day-Glo", as did The Clash on "London Calling" and the Dead Kennedys on "Cesspools in Eden". In the 1990s, the movement of straight edge hardcore punk was associated with radical environmentalism and veganism, particularly groups like Earth Crisis and Vegan Reich. The hardline subculture that promotes biocentrism was spawned from straight edge hardcore punk, influenced by deep ecology.

=== Feminism ===
Riot grrrl is an underground subcultural feminist punk movement that combines feminism, punk music and politics. It began during the early 1990s within the United States in Olympia, Washington, and the greater Pacific Northwest. It is often associated with third-wave feminism, which is sometimes seen as having grown out of the riot grrrl movement, and has recently been seen in current fourth-wave feminist punk music. Riot grrrl bands often address issues such as rape, Domestic Abuse, sexuality, racism, patriarchy, classism, anarchism, and often contain themes of female empowerment. Primary bands associated with the movement include Bikini Kill, Bratmobile, Heavens to Betsy, Excuse 17, Huggy Bear, Skinned Teen, Emily's Sassy Lime and Sleater-Kinney, Italian band Pankhurst, as well as queercore groups like Team Dresch and the Third Sex.

=== Hare Krishna ===
The Filipino punk band the Wuds which was formed in the early 1980s is the first known punk band who composed songs dedicated to Hare Krishna movement. In the 1990s, some notable members of the New York hardcore scene, including Ray Cappo (Youth of Today, Shelter and other bands), John Joseph (Cro-Mags) and Harley Flanagan (Cro-Mags) converted to Hare Krishna. This led to trend within the western hardcore scene that became known as Krishnacore.

=== Islam ===
Taqwacore is a punk subgenre, many of whose members are Muslim artists who live in the West.

=== Liberalism ===
Liberal punks were in the punk subculture from the beginning and are mostly on the liberal left. Notable liberal punks (second wave, mid-1990s to 2000s) include: Bad Religion, Fat Mike of NOFX, Ted Leo, Green Day, Crashdog, Dropkick Murphys, Hoxton Tom McCourt, Jared Gomes of Hed PE, Tim Armstrong of Rancid and Tim McIlrath of Rise Against. Liberal ideologies in punk music are most notably found in the lyrical content of these songs. While viewpoints typically associated with liberals (such as being anti-war) can be seen within the lyrical content of some punk songs, they are also sometimes endorsed by musicians in public statements and interviews as well. Some liberal punks also participated in the Rock Against Bush movement in the mid-2000s, in support of the Democratic Party candidate John Kerry.

=== National Bolshevism ===
Various punks, mainly in Russia, have espoused National Bolshevik ideology. Yegor Letov, of the band Grazhdanskaya Oborona, was a member of the National Bolshevik Party, as were Russian musicians Oleg Sudakov and Nataliya Medvedeva. Dutch punk rock band Brigade M has also promoted National Bolshevik ideology through their subject matter.

=== Neo-Nazism ===
Nazi punks have a white nationalist ideology that is closely related to that of white power skinheads. Ian Stuart Donaldson and his band Skrewdriver are credited with popularizing white power rock and hatecore (for its hateful lyrical themes), or Rock Against Communism. Nazi punks are different from early punks such as Sid Vicious and Siouxsie Sioux, who are believed to have incorporated Nazi imagery such as swastikas for shock or comedy value. "Nazi Punks Fuck Off" is a song by the Dead Kennedys, an American punk rock band, and is often considered the most famous song regarding Nazi punk. The song was released in 1981 and was written in response to the rise of neo-Nazi and far-right punks that had started attending Dead Kennedy shows in response to their satirical song "Kill the Poor". The lyrics of "Nazi Punks Fuck Off" condemn the presence of far-right and fascist punks attending their shows, calling out individuals who espouse racist, sexist, and homophobic beliefs. The song's chorus is a direct call to action, urging punk fans to reject and expel these hateful elements from their community.

=== Nihilism ===
Centering on a belief in the abject lack of meaning and value to life, nihilism was a fixture in some early punk rock and protopunk. The Sex Pistols were central to the association of punk and nihilism, with the Trouser Press Record Guide writing that their "confrontational, nihilistic public image and rabidly nihilistic socio-political lyrics set the tone that continues to guide punk bands." However, researcher Neil Eriksen argues that though "much of the critical realism [of punk rock] expresses cynicism and nihilism, it does serve to question existing relations in such a way that listeners are forced to think about what is being said", so that overt rejection of meaning is primarily concerned with challenging existing values.

=== Situationism ===
The Situationist International (SI) was an early influence on punk subculture in the United Kingdom. Started in continental Europe in the 1950s, the SI was an avant-garde political movement that sought to recapture the ideals of surrealist art and use them to construct new and radical social situations. Malcolm McLaren introduced situationist ideas to punk through his management of the band Sex Pistols. Vivienne Westwood, McLaren's partner and the band's designer/stylist, expressed situationist ideals through fashion that was intended to provoke a specific social response. 15% Pus and DUST, subversive 1990s Manchester bands, staged psycho-geographic walks around Hulme and created human collages from road signs as part of what became known as 'psycho-spectre'. Jamie Reid's distinctive album cover artwork was openly situationist.

=== Socialism ===
The Clash were a blatantly political punk rock band, introducing socialism to the punk scene. Clash frontman Joe Strummer said of his socialist views "I believe in socialism because it seems more humanitarian, rather than every man for himself and 'I'm alright Jack' and all those asshole businessmen with all the loot. I made up my mind from viewing society from that angle. That's where I'm from and there's where I've made my decisions from. That's why I believe in socialism." Some of the original Oi! bands expressed a rough form of socialist working class populism — often mixed with patriotism. Many Oi! bands sang about unemployment, economic inequality, working class power and police harassment. In the 1980s, several notable British socialist punk musicians were involved with Red Wedge. Notable socialist punks include: Attila the Stockbroker, Billy Bragg, Bruce La Bruce, Garry Bushell (until the late 1980s), Chris Dean, Gary Floyd, Jack Grisham, Stewart Home, Dennis Lyxzén, Thomas Mensforth, Fermin Muguruza, Alberto Pla, Tom Robinson, Seething Wells, Paul Simmonds, Rob Tyner, Joe Strummer, Ian Svenonius, Mark Steel and Paul Weller. Neil Eriksen wrote in 1980: "... we feel that elements of punk rock fulfill a revolutionary cultural function".

=== Straight edge ===
Straight edge originated in the Washington, D.C. hardcore punk scene with the Minor Threat song "Straight Edge" written by frontman Ian MacKaye and guitarist Brian Baker. Straight edge involves abstaining from alcohol, tobacco, and recreational drug use. Some who claim the title straight edge also abstain from caffeine, casual sex and meat. Those stricter individuals may be considered part of the hardline subculture. Unlike the shunning of meat and caffeine, refraining from casual sex was without question a practice in the original straight edge lifestyle, but it has been overlooked in many of the later reincarnations of straight edge. For some, straight edge is a simple lifestyle preference, but for others it is a political stance. In many cases, it is a rejection of the perceived self-destructive qualities of punk and hardcore culture. MacKaye has often spoken out against others labeling themselves as being straight edge, as it was never his intention for it to become a movement.

== See also ==
- Anarchism and animal rights
- Anarchism and the arts
- CrimethInc.
- Music and politics
- Protest art
- Rock and roll and the fall of communism
- Rock Against Bush
- Rock Against Communism
- Rock Against Racism
- Rock Against Sexism
- Solarpunk
- Youth politics
- Youth subcultures

== Bibliography ==
- O'Hara, Craig, The Philosophy of Punk, AK Press, 1999 ISBN 1-873176-16-3
- Garofalo, Rebee, Rockin' The Boat: Music and Mass Movements, South End Press, 1991 ISBN 0-89608-427-2
- Sinker, Daniel, We Owe You Nothing, Punk Planet: The Collected Interviews, Akashic Books, 2001 ISBN 1-888451-14-9
- Taylor, Steven, False Prophet: Fieldnotes from the Punk Underground, Wesleyan University Press, 2003 ISBN 0-8195-6667-5
