= Bryan Gray =

American musician

- Origin: Northern California, U.S.
- Genres: Punk rock; hardcore punk; post-hardcore; groove metal; sludge metal; industrial metal
- Occupation(s): Musician, producer
- Instrument(s): Vocals, guitars, bass
- Years active: 1991–present
- Labels: Intense Records, Tooth & Nail Records, Grrr Records, Blood & Ink Records

Bryan Gray is an American musician that has predominately performed with bands in the punk rock and hardcore punk genre, including and most notably, the Blamed, Blenderhead, Left Out, The Satire, and Rocks in Pink Cement. He also has performed in the hardcore band Six Feet Deep. Gray was best known for being the brainchild of The Blamed, which is known for their tenure on Tooth & Nail Records. He also has performed with industrial metal bands such as Mortal and Klank.

== History ==
Gray began his musical career in the band Rocks in Pink Cement. The band was formed by Gray, as well as several friends in California, in the early 1990s. During their activity, they recorded a single demo, which was released around 1991. In 1992, Gray joined Blenderhead and performed during their first three shows, even appearing on their debut demo. By 1993, Gray was offered to join the band Mortal as a touring bassist, which resulted in Rocks in Pink Cement disbanding. Gray took the offer, joining an ensemble cast of Jeff Bellew on guitars and Jim Chaffin on drums, both formerly of the Crucified, as well as Jyro Xhan and Jerome Fontamillas. In his tenure with the band, he recorded with the band on Intense Live Series Vol. 5, performing bass and backing vocals on the recording. With this release, however, he used the moniker of Brian Grey, simply so "people did not know his real name". Shortly after this, Gray was no longer able to tour with the band and then began his two projects, Mend and the Blamed. Though Mend only recorded and released one song, "Token", The Blamed signed with Tooth & Nail Records and recorded their debut album, 21. The band at the time consisted of Gray, Jim Chaffin on drums, Eric Churchill on bass, and Aaron Bradford on guitars.

The next year, at Tomfest, Gray created a side-project called Left Out, alongside Myk Porter (Six Feet Deep) on guitars, Daren Diolosa (Klank) on guitars, Jake Landrau (the Blamed) on guitars, Jesse Smith (Zao) on drums, and Gray on bass and vocals. In 1996, the band recorded their debut album: Pride Kills. By this time, Gray moved to Cleveland, Ohio, joining Six Feet Deep as their bassist after Matthew Simmons departed. Gray recorded new material for the Blamed, Left Out, and Six Feet Deep, with Left Out's Serve Self and Six Feet Deep's The Road Less Traveled released in 1997, and the Blamed's ...Again released in 1998. However, Six Feet Deep disbanded in 1997, leading him to move to Chicago, Illinois, where he would become associated with JPUSA. The Blamed and Left Out would both continue to serve as Gray's main projects, releasing albums rather consistently, until 2002, when Left Out merged with the Blamed. In 2003, however, the Blamed disbanded. At this time, Gray had been in contact with Living Sacrifice and had been set to join the band as Bruce Fitzhugh was planning on departing. Cory Brandan of Eso-Charis had been playing guitars, but with Fitzhugh's departure, he would be taking guitars and vocal duties, with Gray filling in the rhythm guitar position. However, this never occurred due to the band's disbanding.

In 2004, Gray formed the metalcore band the Satire. Originally, the project was known as The Blamed is Dead and consisted of Gray and former Living Sacrifice drummer Lance Garvin. However, eventually, Garvin departed, and Gray took the project in a different direction, being the only consistent member for a number of years. In 2008, the Satire recorded Norway Demo while on tour in Scandinavia alongside the Chariot and Benea Reach. Around this time, the band went to Nashville and recorded a self-titled EP with Joel Lauver of Trenches. The EP would be released through Blood & Ink Records in 2012. The Blamed briefly reunited in 2012. In 2016, the Blamed reunited with Gray at the helm once more, alongside fellow original member Jim Chaffin on drums with Sid Doffour on bass, Jeff Locke on guitars and Wiley Willis on vocals. The band performed at Audiofeed that year and then returned to inactivity until 2018. The band returned with a split EP with Gray's other project the Satire, which at this point consisted of a whole new lineup. In 2019, the Blamed released The Church is Hurting People, their first album since reuniting. In 2020, The Satire released a 7-inch: The Presence.

== Bands ==
Current

- The Blamed – guitars, vocals (1994–2003, 2012, 2016–present)
- The Satire – guitars, vocals (2004–present)

Former

- Rocks in Pink Cement – bass (1991–1993)
- Blenderhead – guitars (1992)
- Mend – vocals, bass (1994)
- Left Out – guitars (1996–2002), vocals (1995–2002), bass (1995–1996)
- Six Feet Deep – bass (1996–1997)
- The Blamed is Dead – drums (2003-2004)

Live

- Mortal – bass (1993)
- Klank – guitars
- Living Sacrifice – guitars (2003)

== Discography ==
Rocks in Pink Cement

- Demo (1991)

Blenderhead

- Ep (1993)

The Blamed

- 21 (1994)
- Frail (1996)
- ...Again (1998)
- Forever (1999)
- Germany (2000)
- Isolated Incident (2001)
- Give Us Barrabas (2002)
- The Blamed X The Satire (2018)
- The Church Is Hurting People (2019)

Left Out

- Pride Kills (1996)
- Serve Self (1997)
- For the Working Class (1999)
- Left Out (2002)

The Satire

- Norway Demo (2008)
- The Satire (2012)
- The Blamed X The Satire (2018)
- The Presence (2020)

Mortal

- Intense Live Series Vol. 5 (1993)

Six Feet Deep

- The Road Less Traveled (1997)

Guest performances

- Cashists, Fascists, and Other Fungus – Crashdog (1995)
- EP – Blenderhead (1996)
- The Land, the Bread, and the People – Ballydowse (1998)

Production

- Cashists, Fascists, and Other Fungus – Crashdog (1995)
- Bite the Hand That Feeds – Brick Assassin (2016)
- Having a VHS for a Leg – Captive Portal (2017)
- Death Made Its Offer – October Bird of Death (2017)
