= Roadside Monument =

American math rock band

- Origin: Seattle, Washington, United States
- Genres: Math rock, instrumental rock emo
- Years active: 1994–1998, 2002–2003
- Label: Tooth & Nail
- Members: Doug Lorig; Johnathon Ford; Matt Johnson
- Past members: Mike Dente; Todd Florence; Joel Metzger

Roadside Monument was an American math rock band from Seattle, Washington, who were active from 1994 to 1998 and then again from 2002 to 2003.

== History ==
Before Roadside Monument began, singer Doug Lorig was involved in other bands. During junior high, high school, and college, he performed in the bands Cow Shrapnel, Waterfront, and Sixth Hour, all of which also featured another future Roadside Monument member, bassist Todd Florence.

Roadside Monument signed with Tooth & Nail Records about four months after they formed in 1994. They released their Tooth & Nail debut, a 7-inch vinyl EP called My Life Is Green, in 1995. Their full-length album Beside This Brief Hexagonal was also released in 1996. After the rest of the band left, Matt Johnson (of Blenderhead) (drums) and Johnathan Ford (bass) joined the band. Lorig, Ford and Johnson became the band's sole members on all future releases. In 1997, Eight Hours Away from Being a Man was released, along with a pair of split EPs (with Puller and Frodus). Eight Hours Away from Being a Man became a prominent album in the indie rock, emo and Christian underground music scenes.

Roadside Monument broke up after the Cornerstone Festival in 1998, when Ford moved to Chicago, Illinois. They had already written and recorded another album, called I Am the Day of Current Taste, which was released several months after their breakup.

In 2002, Ford returned to Seattle, and Roadside Monument reunited. The band played local shows and toured with Pedro the Lion before breaking up again in 2003. They have played occasional reunion shows over the years since, including in 2017 in Seattle and in 2022 at Furnace Fest in Birmingham, Alabama.

== Side projects ==
Since their breakup, Roadside Monument's members have participated in a variety of bands:

- Lorig is currently fronting the band Calm Collapse, which released their debut album "Mirrored Nature" in late 2022, and is currently readying their second record.
- Suffering and the Hideous Thieves is an experimental band founded by Jeff "Suffering" Bettger of another former Tooth & Nail band, Ninety Pound Wuss. Bettger writes most of the songs, but Ford and Johnson have also played in the band.
- Lorig was in the final lineup for Raft of Dead Monkeys, another band that Bettger fronted after Ninety Pound Wuss. Ford and Johnson also played in Raft of Dead Monkeys, a controversial band that broke up in 2001.
- Lorig has since played in the space rock band Black Eagle and fronted the grunge band Patrol.
- Ford was a founding member of the "doom hardcore" band Warlord and filled in on bass for them during live shows. He left Warlord before they recorded their lone full-length album, Rock the Foe Hammer, which came out in 1999. , through Solid State Records.
- Ford filled in on bass for Pedro the Lion from time to time after Roadside Monument's first breakup.
- Ford is the core member of Unwed Sailor.
- Johnson is the drummer for The Out Circuit and also played in Supine to Sit, which released one album on Dischord Records in 2004.

== Critical response ==
Throughout their history, Roadside Monument has had several clashes with some Christian bookstore chains, who cited their songs as being "controversial". Examples of such songs included "Sperm Ridden Burden" (which Lorig said Ford wrote about seeing a child on a bus who was being raised by a single mother) and "O. J. Simpson House Auction" (the news on television when Lorig was looking for the title to the song he was working on). The band members did not mind that their music was not being sold in Christian bookstores, because they preferred to think of themselves as a "band" rather than as a "Christian band". In an interview with HM Magazine soon after their breakup, drummer Matt Johnson said, "... I think the problem comes in when you start using the word 'Christian' as an adjective. And when I start hearing talk like that, my first inclination is to run totally in the opposite direction.... It's just a debate that I've been over and over with people so much, that I'm not even sure what to say anymore. It's like, I'm a Christian and I play music, and if that means my band is a 'Christian band', then whatever."

Many fans of Roadside Monument like the band because of their creative sound. They are credited as being key contributors to the original emo sub-culture and sound of indie rock which existed in the mid to late nineties. Their songs featured unique structure that was a blatant rejection of the verse/chorus structure followed by many popular songs. In addition, their unusual guitar parts, abnormal rhythms, and abrupt tempo changes, topped off by Lorig's emotional vocals, gained them acclaim and made the band's style almost unable to be labeled. Indeed, reviewers of the band would describe them as emo, math rock, or just regular rock.

NPR Music and Tiny Desk producer Lars Gotrich wrote the liner notes for the 2022 vinyl release of the band's third and final album I Am the Day of Current Taste. In this long essay, he writes: “it is a hulking rock-and-roll motorcycle apocalypse... and that’s just the first minute and a half… the kind of opening blitzkrieg that thins out the herd; only the deepest listeners survive.”

The band is featured extensively in the 2026 novel Recommended If You Like by Adam Voith.

== Current members ==
- Doug Lorig: guitar, vocals
- Matt Johnson: drums
- Johnathon Ford: bass guitar, vocals

=== Founding members ===
- Todd Florence - bass guitar
- Mike Dente - guitar, vocals
- Joel Metzger - drums
- Doug Lorig - guitar, vocals

== Discography ==
- My Life is Green (7-inch, 1996, Tooth & Nail Records)
- Beside This Brief Hexagonal (1996, Tooth & Nail Records)
- Roadside Monument/Puller Split EP (1997, Tooth & Nail Records)
- Eight Hours Away from Being a Man (1997, Tooth & Nail Records)
- Roadside Monument / Frodus Split EP (1997, Tooth & Nail Records)
- I Am the Day of Current Taste (1998, Tooth & Nail Records)
