= Ninety Pound Wuss (album) =

Studio album by Ninety Pound Wuss
- Released: June 7, 1996
- Studio: Robert Lang (Shoreline, Washington)
- Genres: Christian punk, hardcore punk, pop punk
- Length: 40:23
- Label: Tooth & Nail Records
- Producers: Bob Moon, Ninety Pound Wuss

Ninety Pound Wuss chronology
Ninety Pound Wuss (1996)	Where Meager Die Of Self Interest (1997)

Ninety Pound Wuss is the debut studio album by American Christian punk group Ninety Pound Wuss, released in 1996 through Tooth And Nail Records. Yuri Ruley, drummer of MxPx, worked as a drum technician on the record. The track "Something Must Break" is considered as the band's most popular song, as it appeared on multiple compilation albums and even has a music video.

== Track listing ==
No.	Title	Length
1.	"Perseverance"	2:34
2.	"Act Up"	2:32
3.	"Girl Song"	1:45
4.	"Telephone Wire"	1:32
5.	"Daylight Savings Man"	2:42
6.	"A.S.D. (Apathetic Selfish Destruction)"	2:15
7.	"Misplaced Society"	1:03
8.	"Shedding Blood"	2:20
9.	"Red"	2:42
10.	"The New Age"	2:47
11.	"Responsibility"	2:27
12.	"Olympia"	1:39
13.	"Legalism"	1:23
14.	"It All Goes Off"	1:56
15.	"Freedom"	2:03
16.	"Cut Throat"	2:03
17.	"Spiritual Small Guy"	2:29
18.	"Something Must Break"	1:53
19.	"I Am (Everything)"	2:28

== Personnel ==
=== Performers ===
- Jeff Suffering - Vocals, bass
- John Himmelburger - Guitar
- Marty Martinez - Drums

=== Production ===
- Ninety Pound Wuss - Music, production
- Bob Moon - Production
- Aaron Warner - Engineering
- Paul Corio - Artwork
- Brandon Ebel - Photography, executive producer
- Yuri Ruley - Drum technician
