= Where Meager Die of Self Interest =

Where Meager Die Of Self Interest

Studio album by Ninety Pound Wuss
- Released: October 28, 1997
- Studio: Robert Lang (Shoreline, Washington)
- Genre: Post-hardcore, Christian punk
- Length: 46:13
- Label: Tooth & Nail Records
- Producer: Tim Mac

Ninety Pound Wuss chronology
Ninety Pound Wuss (1995)	Where Meager Die Of Self Interest (1997)	Short Hand Operation (1999)

Professional ratings
Review scores
Source	Rating
Allmusic	3/5 stars

Where Meager Die Of Self Interest is the second studio album by American christian punk group Ninety Pound Wuss, released in 1997 through Tooth & Nail Records. The album shows a shift in style from their self-titled debut, with the lyrics being much more mature and the music growing darker.

== Track listing ==
All tracks are written by Jeff Suffering, except for 8, Jeff Suffering and Jonathan F.

No.	Title	Length
1.	"Backwards Thinking"	2:39
2.	"Broken Circles"	1:43
3.	"The Dawning Of This Night Divine"	2:57
4.	"Queen Maggot"	3:55
5.	"Heresy"	2:00
6.	"Unscarred Act Of Trust"	4:16
7.	"Senseless Accusations"	2:04
8.	"The Party's Over"	1:43
9.	"Sick And You're Wrong"	1:38
10.	"Premonition"	3:21
11.	"Last Time Lost Count"	1:19
12.	"Junk"	2:40
13.	"One Track Mind"	2:17
14.	"Blank Stare"	13:30

== Personnel ==
=== Ninety Pound Wuss ===
- Jeff Suffering - Vocals, keyboards
- John Himmelberger - Guitar on 1, 5, 6, 7, 9, 11, 12, and 14, background vocals
- John Spalding - Guitar on 2, 3, 4, 8, 10, and 13
- Dale Yob - Bass, background vocals
- Marty Martinez - Drums

=== Additional Performers ===
- Marty W. - Background vocals
- Johnathan F. - Background vocals
- Aaron Warner - Background vocals

=== Production ===
- Tim Mac - Recording, mixing
- Aaron Warner - Engineering
- Brain Gardner - Mastering
- Suzy Hutchinson - Layout
