= Short Hand Operation =

1999 studio album by Ninety Pound Wuss

Studio album by Ninety Pound Wuss
- Released: May 4, 1999
- Recorded: at Avast! Studios
- Genre: Post-hardcore
- Length: 48:02
- Label: Tooth & Nail Records
- Producer: Steve Kravac, Ninety Pound Wuss

Ninety Pound Wuss chronology
Where Meager Die Of Self Interest (1997)	Short Hand Operation (1999)	Hierarchy of Snakes (2000)

Professional ratings
Review scores
Source	Rating
Allmusic	3/5 stars
Exclaim!	Positive

Short Hand Operation is the third and final studio album by American christian punk band Ninety Pound Wuss, released in 1999 through Tooth & Nail Records. The album showcases a much more atmospheric side of the band, featuring the use of synthesizers. Jeff Suffering, vocalist of the band, was very satisfied with the record and considers it as the "best record [he'll] ever record".

== Track listing ==
All tracks are written by Ninety Pound Wuss.

No.	Title	Length
1.	"Short Hand Operation"	3:09
2.	"Fulfilled"	4:26
3.	"Torment In Tension"	3:14
4.	"Outbreak"	2:21
5.	"Nostalgia"	4:33
6.	"It Seems So Far Away"	4:24
7.	"Nolo Contendre"	3:01
8.	"Hope"	2:35
9.	"Letting Loose"	2:51
10.	"Not Like Me"	1:53
11.	"Intermediate Laceration"	4:59
12.	"What I Am"	3:39
13.	"Second Stage Of Adolescence"	3:06
14.	"At The End Of It All"	3:48

== Personnel ==
=== Performers ===
- Jeff Suffering - Vocals
- Matt Johnson - Bass
- Marty Martinez - Drums
- John Spalding - Guitar

=== Production ===
- Kip Beelman - Engineering
- Steve Kravac - Production
- Ninety Pound Wuss - Music, production
