= The Out Circuit =

American rock band

- Origin: Washington, DC, United States
- Genres: Indie rock, post-hardcore
- Years active: 2000–present
- Labels: Lujo
- Members: Nathan Burke; Andy Gale; Rachel Burke; Matt Johnson
- Past members: Bob Massey; Chaz Barber; Paul Michel; Kevin Lamiell

The Out Circuit is an indie rock/post-hardcore band/project by former Frodus co-frontman Nathan Burke currently signed to Lujo Records. The Out Circuit was originally based in Washington, DC but now resides in Seattle, Washington.

== History ==
In 2000, following the breakup of his previous band Frodus, Nathan Burke formed The Out Circuit. After releasing an album (2003's Burn Your Scripts Boys) and completing a couple of tours Burke decided to move the band across the country to Seattle, WA. After several years of recording 2008 saw the release of the second Out Circuit album, Pierce the Empire With A Sound. The album was mixed by Teppei Teranishi of the experimental rock band Thrice. The album also featured guest vocals from Sean Ingram of Coalesce and Dustin Kensrue of Thrice.

== Members ==
Current members

- Nathan Burke – vocals, guitars, bass, keys. Former member of Frodus Real Cool Rain, and Night Is Invisible.
- Andy Gale – drums. Former member of Haram, Corn on Macabre.
- Rachel Burke – vocals. Former member of Beauty Pill.
- Matt Johnson – drums. Former member of Suffering and the Hideous Thieves, Roadside Monument, Ninety Pound Wuss, Blenderhead, Raft of Dead Monkeys, Starflyer 59, and the bands of Jeremy Enigk, and Rocky Votolato.

Former members

- Bob Massey – guitars. Current frontman of The Gena Rowlands Band.
- Chaz Barber – keys. Current electronic artist who performs under the name Brahm.
- Paul Michel – bass. Current solo artist on Magic Bullet Records.
- Kevin Lamiell – bass. Former member of Majority Rule, Haram, and Trial by Fire.

== Discography ==
=== Albums ===
- Burn Your Scripts Boys (Lujo Records), (2003)
- Pierce The Empire With A Sound (Lujo Records), (2008)

=== Compilation appearances ===
- All I Want For Christmas: A Lujo Records Holiday Comp track:Emmanuel (Lujo Records), (2004)
- Happy Together: A Lujo Records Wedding Comp track:This Will Be Our Year (originally by The Zombies) (Lujo Records), 2006
- Masquerade: A Lujo Records Covers Comp track:Dark Horizions (originally by Frantic Mantis) (Lujo Records), 2007
