= Klank =

American industrial metal band

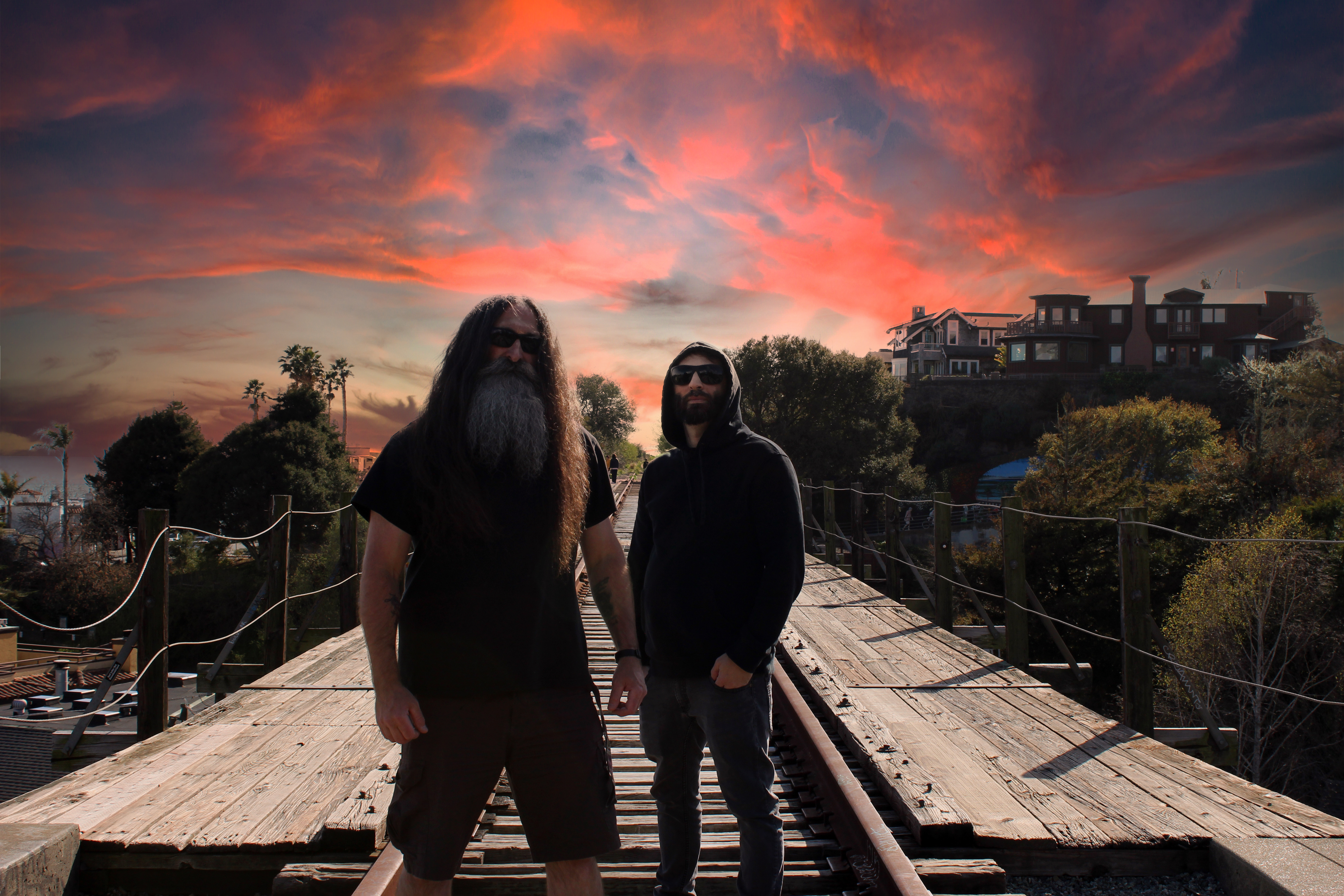
- Klank in 2023. L–R: Daren "Klank" Diolosa and Pat Servedio

Background information
- Origin: Long Island, New York, U.S.
- Genres: Industrial metal, groove metal
- Years active: 1993–2001, 2007–present
- Labels: Tooth & Nail, SmokeDogg Productions
- Members: Daren "Klank" Diolosa; Pat Servedio
- Past members: Ray Scheuring; John Zaletel; Danny Owsley; Charlie Parker; Bryan Gray; Eric Wilkins
- Website: klanknation.com Klank on Facebook

Klank, also stylized as kLaNk or KLANK, is an American industrial metal band that originated out of Long Island, New York in December 1993. The project began after Daren Diolosa, the brainchild of Klank, departed from the fellow industrial band Circle of Dust. Diolosa carried the project as a solo project until around 1997, when he began performing live. Following the live performances, Pat Servedio joined as a full-time member, with Diolosa and Servedio joining as a team. The band would go through many members, eventually settling on the lineup of Diolosa, Servedio, and former Every Day Life drummer Eric Wilkins.

== History ==
Klank began in December 1993, following Circle of Dust's Klayton disbanding the live lineup of the band, which included Daren Diolosa, nicknamed Klank. Klank began writing his own solo material from there, eventually debuting with "Animosity". The song would be released via R.E.X. Records on two compilations. In 1995, Klank signed with Tooth & Nail Records and began to work on the project's debut album, Still Suffering. To prove his dedication to working hard, Diolosa signed his contract in his own blood. With the production of the album, Diolosa reunited with his former Circle of Dust bandmate Klayton, as well as Buka of Argyle Park. Diolosa had been featured on Argyle Park's debut album, Misguided, which also featured Mark Salomon (ex-The Crucified, Stavesacre), Jeff Bellew (ex-The Crucified, Stavesacre, Chatterbox), Tommy Victor (Prong), Jyro Xhan (Mortal), Dirk Lemmenes (ex-Focused, Stavesacre), and several others. The album came out through the label and by 1997, the project began to tour with a lineup of Diolosa on vocals, guitars, and keyboards, with Every Day Life members Mike Niosea on guitars, Carl Weaver on guitars, and Eric Wilkins on drums.

In 1999, the band recorded their sophomore album, Numb, which featured an entirely new lineup, including Danny "Ducci" Owsley on guitars, John Zaletel on drums, and Pat Servedio on guitars, bass, and programming. The album was the first release under Klank's new label, SmokeDogg Productions, and was also released on Progressive Arts Music. The album would later be re-released under the title of NUMB...Reborn. According to Klank, "Ducci" joined the band by recommendation of Bryan Gray, who had filled in with the band who Diolosa had worked with in The Blamed and Six Feet Deep. Diolosa met Ducci by Gray and would ask him to join. Ducci would just graduate from school before going on tour the next day. By the end of 2001, the band would embark on hiatus. Diolosa would go to work for Ringling Brothers Circus as a transportation manager.

In 2007, In Memory Of..., was released via SmokeDogg Productions, once more. The EP featured six new songs and several older songs. With the release of the EP, the band was revitalized, consisting of Diolosa, Servedio, Owsley, Zaletel, and new bassist Charlie Parker. However, by 2010, the band consisted of Diolosa, Servedio, and a returning Eric Wilkins. The same year, Numb was re-released as Numb...Reborn, which featured several new songs, featuring Mike Phillips (ex-Deliverance, ex-The Sacrificed) Larry Farkas (Vengeance Rising, Die Happy, Once Dead) and Jim Chaffin (ex-The Crucified, Deliverance, the Blamed). In 2012, the band released Urban Warfare. The album featured a guest spot for Doug Pinnick of King's X, who Diolosa had been friends with for many years. V13.net gave the album a review, stating that "At the end of the day I feel Urban Warfare is the best Klank effort to date; they have virtually perfected their brand of infectiously-catchy, insanely groovy metal."

In 2017, Klank released their fifth studio album, Rise. The album was very well received, with Ilker Yücel of Regen Magazine writing "For this, RISE may be KLANK's most arresting album to date, and one that this writer imagines will be very difficult for the band to top in the future." and Bruce Moore of V13.net writing "All things considered, I think this is my favorite Klank release since their debut, Still Suffering. All nine tracks flow well and I really enjoyed listening to the entire package. No fillers to be found here, just good, honest, groove-infused industrial metal." During that same year, Klank would also record the score for a documentary created by Bruce Moore, who apparently was a longtime friend of his, titled Metal Missionaries, which would feature bands in the Christian metal genre, including Vials of Wrath, A Hill to Die Upon, Frost Like Ashes, BoughtXBlood, and Antidemon.

== Members ==
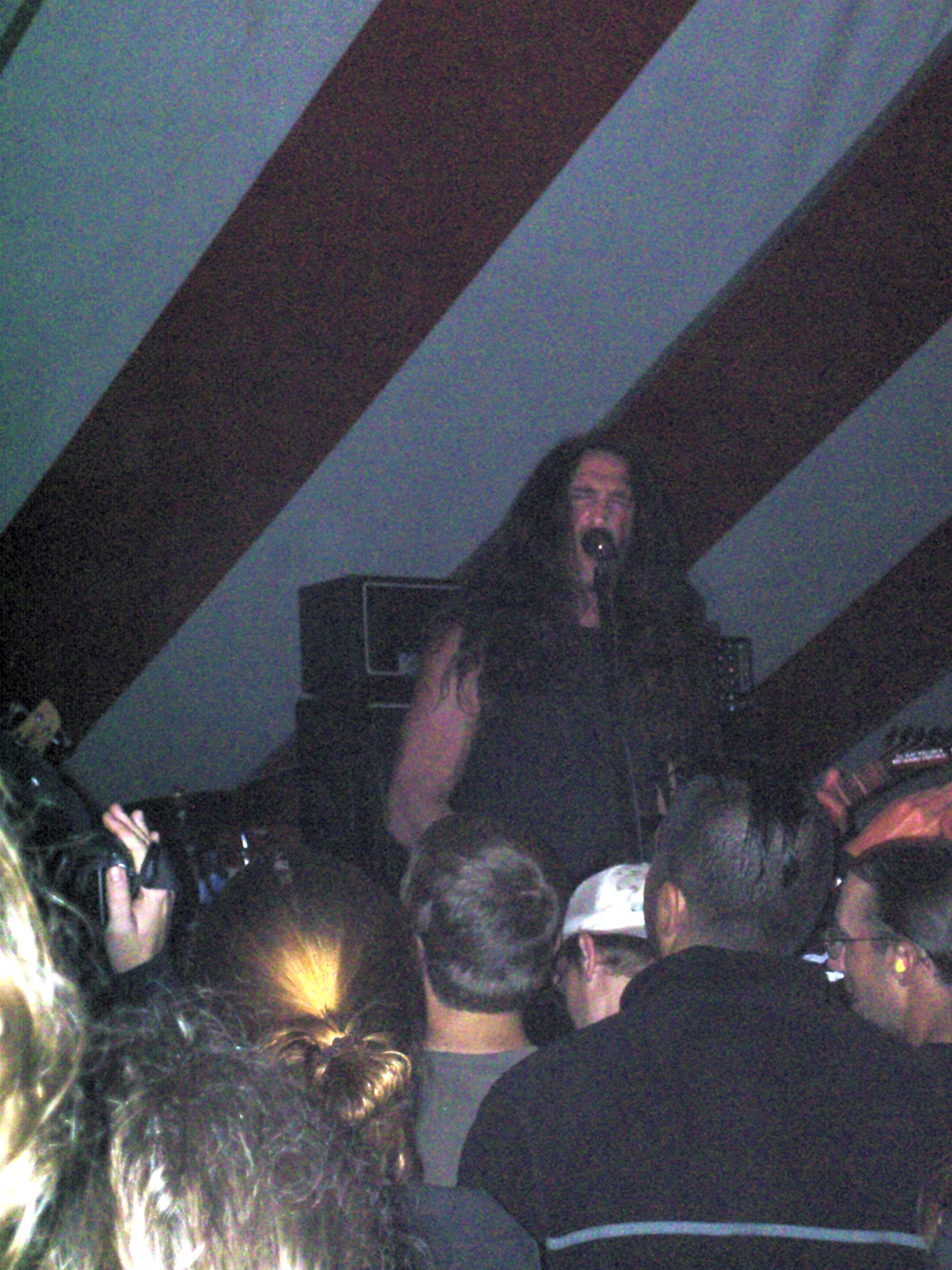
Daren Diolosa with Klank at Cornerstone Festival 2007

Current

- Daren "Klank" Diolosa – vocals, guitars, bass, keyboards, programming (1993–2001, 2007–present)
- Pat Servedio – guitars, bass, keyboards, programming (1997–2001, 2007–present)

Former

- Eric Wilkins – drums (1997 [live], 2010–2018)
- Danny "Ducci" Owsley – guitars (1997–2001, 2007–2010)
- Charlie Parker – bass (2007–2010)
- John Zaletel – drums (1997–2001, 2007–2010)
- Ray Scheuring – drums (1999 [live])
- Bryan Gray – guitars (1997)

Live

- Mike Nicosia – guitars (1997)
- Carl Weaver – guitars (1997)

== Discography ==
Studio albums

- Still Suffering (1995)
- Numb (1999)
- In Memory Of... (2007)
- Numb...Reborn (2010)
- Urban Warfare (2012)
- Rise (2017)
- Between Unholy and Divine, Vol. 1 (2022)
- Between Unholy and Divine, Vol. 2 (2023)

EPs

- Downside (1997)

Musical scores

- Metal Missionaries (The Score) (2017)
- Metal Health: An Instrumental Musical Journey (2019)

Compilation appearances

- Demo-lition II (1994, R.E.X. Records) – "Animosity (demo)"
- Can You Dig It? III (1994, R.E.X. Records) – "Animosity (demo)"
- Sweet Family Music: A Tribute to Stryper (1996, Flying Tart Records) – "The Way" (cover of Stryper)
- Tooth & Nail Records Sampler Vol. 3 (1996, Tooth & Nail Records) - "Downside"
- Songs from the Penalty Box (1997, Tooth & Nail Records) - "Downside"
- 4th Anniversary Box Set (1997, Tooth & Nail Records) - "Downside"
- Audiomata 1.0 (1999, Flaming Fish Music) - "Blind"
- Runnin' with the Devil: A Tribute to Van Halen (2000, Progressive Arts Music) – "I'll Wait" (cover of Van Halen)
- The Classics Hard (2004, Tooth & Nail Records) - "Downside"
