= Every Day Life =

Christian rapcore group

- Also known as: Every Day Life in Southern California
- Genres: Christian rapcore, rapcore, Christian metal
- Years active: 1992–present
- Labels: Alarma, KMG, Paradigm
- Members: Tedd Cookerly; Carl Weaver; Eric Wilkins; Jim "KingSize" Rupe
- Past members: Mike Nocosia; Jason Bowen; Scott Silleta; Michael Albright; Evan Stromberg; Shawn Pauling

Every Day Life, later simply known as EDL, is a Christian rapcore group. The band became identified with the straight edge movement, which advocates abstinence from sex, drugs and tobacco.

The band's first two albums were pulled from Christian bookstores. Their videos were played on MTV, their albums entered the college radio charts, and they were nominated for a Dove Award.

The Encyclopedia of Contemporary Christian Music describes the band as having been "the first group in Christian music to address political issues in a responsible manner." The band wrote about issues of social and economic justice within Christianity and in the larger world.

Larry Norman was an influence for the band, with the lyricist telling one interviewer that "He wrote about the issues... just as Steve Taylor did, and just as Rez Band did when they started. These artists who originally started talking about the issues of Christianity now have no place in the market, because now the market has become songs of confirmation. And it almost makes it seem as though something we're doing is unheard of, and maybe not even Christian." HM jokingly remarked that the Chick tract "Angels?", which describes the evils of Christian rock, had been inspired by the band.

== History ==
EDL was founded in 1992 as Every Day Life in Southern California. Early on the band signed to R.E.X. Records and laid down some material for an album. However, the label went defunct before releasing any EDL material. After being released from that contract, they signed with Alarma Records and produced their debut album, Disgruntled. Frontman Cookerly reported that "when I got into the studio, I got upset and angry and yelled my way through it ... My goal was to write the most upset record the Christian market had ever seen, to completely alienate everybody." Production was managed by Lanny Cordola. In addition to sporting an American Flag with the band's name cut out, the cover image of Disgruntled shows a scene from the attack on Reginald Denny, part of the Los Angeles riots of 1992. The flag was intended to represent the broken ideal of American life, and the photo to be a graphic portrayal of the extremes of life and society.

One reviewer said that the album's blend of musical styles "Can seriously affect your blinkered ideas on what Christian music should sound like."

"When you grow up in a community like Long Beach that has such a wealth of culture, and you mix that with drive by shootings that happen within a few blocks of your house, It opens up a whole range of things to talk about."

— Tedd Cookerly

Their debut album contained a cover of the Gil Scott Heron song "Whitey on the Moon" (with guests Gospel Gangstaz) that used the word "nigga". Lyrically, the artist described most of their debut as being "super-personal." On one song, the lyricist dealt with his own childhood. His mother, addicted to prescription drugs and alcohol, and depressed, had told him several times to commit suicide. American Standard contains lyrics on the topics of rape, the exploitation of Native Americans, as well as the dark sides of the music business and church politics. HM described it as having "insurgent lyrics and subversive undertones that challenged the status quo of our society."

The band received criticism from churches for their unusual sound and the content of their albums. In one incident after a show, frontman Cookerly was surrounded by a crowd of Bible-bearing teenagers who told him that his actions were a reflection of what the Antichrist would do. "I cried a lot that night," Cookerly reported. One specific criticism of the band was that they do not often use "God" or "Jesus" in their lyrics. On that topic frontman Cookerly stated "It has never been our position that Christ would be prostrated to gain industry status and give foundation to our [bands'] Christianity... Why, just for the sake of using his name, should I say Jesus?" "[The] fact is this," Cookerly told 7ball, "some bands are called to be a praise band like The Supertones, and some are called to educate Christians like The Blamed, and we are here to bear witness to the disenfranchised."

Christians are still out there selling their testimony as if it's some great infomercial for the Super Salvation 9000, you know, "It slices, it dices, it saves you from your sin."

— Tedd Cookerly

American Standard was named for the toilet manufacturer. The album contains social criticism aimed at society, as explained by the lyricist: "our standards have slipped. They're crap. And without getting too vulgar, we as a society piss out all this hypocrisy." The criticisms also extend to Christian culture, "Christianity, we're in trouble, because Christianity for the typical white family isn't that [stereotype] anymore. It's a single parent family, it's still having to deal with alcoholism, it's still having to deal with drug abuse, it's still having to deal with date rape. And any of the things that the world dictates happens to the average white family that's Christian in American society... Our God is a wonderful, just and redeeming Jesus Christ, but people see the need to bring out all these unnecessarily. You know, the Word of God stands alone, and it almost seems as though they have to put powdered sugar on what's already sweet."

Production of American Standard was handled by Mike Knott. One reviewer found that the songs "tend to mesh into one another, creating the 'one long song' effect... the best way to tell each separate track apart is the tempo and length of screams," but that that didn't detract from the musical or lyrical relevance of the album. Another commented that the album could set the standard for "Christian hard, heavy, and puncturing music." A reviewer in a more conservative publication disagreed, calling the lyrics "downright absurd" ramblings and criticized the album for the lack of direct references to Jesus. The song "Salt Circles" received a GMA Dove Award nomination in the "Hard Music Recorded Song of the Year" category in 1999.

Their 2000 release Moment of Clarity marked a slight change in sound for the band - a turn toward a pop and rock oriented sound. HM found that change to be subtle, but enough to commercialize the music.

After Moment of Clarity was released, the band was courted by major labels including Roadrunner Records. They eventually signed to a Universal imprint, but that deal folded when Universal restructured and eliminated that particular subsidiary. The band fell back to KMG, which had then been resurrected as Fashion Pop Records by Frank Chimento, releasing an eponymous album in 2001.

Since this time, nothing has been heard by EDL. Though there was no news on whether EDL has disbanded or just put on hiatus, Wilkins, Weaver and guitarist Mike Nociasa had all joined Klank's live lineup. The band more recently has reunited for shows in 2017.

== Discography ==
- 1996: Disgruntled (Alarma Records)
- 1997: American Standard
- 2000: Moment of Clarity (KMG Records)
- 2001: Every Day Life (Fashion Pop)

== Members ==
Current

- Tedd Cookerly – vocals
- Carl Weaver – guitar
- Eric Wilkins – drums (Klank)
- Jim "KingSize" Rupe – bass guitar (ex-Focused)

Former

- Jason Bowen – bass guitar (ex-Overcome)
- Jensen Tripp – bass guitar
- The Nayt – guitar
- Michael "Oxx" Albright – bass guitar
- Jeff Elbel – bass
- Mike Nocosia – guitar
- Shawn Pawling – guitar
- Evan Stromberg – guitar
- Scott "DJ Cool Rock" Silleta
