= Live at Cornerstone 2000 =

Live at Cornerstone 2000 may refer to the following music albums:

- Live at Cornerstone 2000: Plugged, by The Choir
- Live at Cornerstone 2000: Unplugged, by The Choir
- Live at Cornerstone 2000 (One Bad Pig album)
