= Raft of Dead Monkeys =

Rock band from Seattle, Washington, U.S.

- Origin: Seattle, Washington, US
- Genres: Punk rock, hardcore punk, noise rock
- Years active: 1999-2001, 2004
- Past members: Jeff Suffering; John Spalding (RIP); Matt Johnson; Davey; Jonathan Ford; Damien Jurado; James Park; Doug Lorig

Raft of Dead Monkeys was an American rock band from Seattle, Washington, United States, known for their controversy within the Christian punk scene. Described as a hypothetical band mocking rock culture, their early stage shows consisted of vulgar lyrics, male strippers and bloody nurses. They broke up on October 22, 2001.

The majority of the band members were openly Christian and previously played in bands on Tooth & Nail Records, a label that featured primarily Christian rock bands. The band itself was not affiliated with Tooth & Nail, but the fan base of affiliated bands (Roadside Monument, Ninety Pound Wuss) was largely Christian, and was left confused when Raft released their first album which contained explicit lyrics.

In 2001 Raft was invited to play Tomfest, a Christian underground music festival, and received mixed reactions when singer Jeff Suffering flipped off the crowd during their song "Two Year Lease", which features the lyrics, "you're not the only whore in town, you're just the best fuck around." Tomfest founder Mikee Bridges later issued an apology to those who were offended by the performance.

In an interview, Suffering explained the band's concept with the following:

It was art and we were making some statements about our culture by mirroring it, copying it and throwing it back on people’s faces to like say, “Hey, this is what people adhere to and this is it.” We thought it was funny and humorous and a lot of people didn’t get the joke and didn’t get that we were characters that we had created when we performed sort of to break the Rock ‘n’ Roll idea/lifestyle, although we don’t really have that idea or lifestyle, at least I don’t.

Raft of Dead Monkeys played a reunion show in January 2004 at Studio 7 in Seattle.

In 2016, Interesting Productions released a documentary about the band.

== Members ==
Last known lineup

- Jeff Suffering - Bass, Vocals (DRYBNZ, Suffering and the Hideous Thieves, Ninety Pound Wuss)
- Doug Lorig - Guitar, Vocals - (Roadside Monument, Black Eagle, Patrol)
- John Spalding - Guitar (Ninety Pound Wuss, Suffering and the Hideous Thieves) (RIP)
- Davey B. - Drums

Former

- Matt Johnson - Drums (Roadside Monument, Blenderhead, Ninety Pound Wuss, Don't Know, Supine to Sit, Rocky Votolato, Jeremy Enigk, Starflyer 59)
- Jonathan Ford - (Unwed Sailor, Roadside Monument, Decahedron, Pedro the Lion, Mr. Bishop's Fist, Ester Drang, Scientific, Native Lights)
- Damien Jurado - (Coolidge)
- James Parks
- Brian Wall
- Christopher Pugmire

== Discography ==
=== Albums ===
- Thoroughlev (2001 Burnout Records)

=== Extended plays ===
- DBM EP (1999 Make Believe Recordings)
- Joey the Pigfucker (unreleased)

=== Compilation appearances ===
- Various Artists: Is It... Dead? (2001 Sub Pop)
- "tijuana"{making pots and pans}/{rock n rolls not dead}volume 2,(2001(c)orangepuss records)
