= Pocket Change =

Pocket Change may refer to:

- Pocket Change (band), a Christian punk band from the United States
- Pocket Change (arcade), a chain of video arcades owned by Namco Cybertainment
- Pocket Change (The Price Is Right), a segment game from the television game show The Price Is Right
- "Pocket Change", a song by Alabama Shakes from their 2012 album Boys & Girls

== See also ==
- Pocket Money
