= Left Out =

Punk band from Chicago, U.S. (1995–2002)

- Origin: Chicago, IL
- Genre: Christian punk
- Years active: 1995-2002
- Past members: Jason Seiler; Chris Colbert; Bryan Gray; Darren Diolosa; Jake Landrau; Myk Porter; Cleetus Adrian; Matt Switaj; Christopher Witala; Trevor Witala; Greg Jacques; Brent Kaping; Jesse Smith

Left Out was a Chicago, Illinois Christian punk supergroup that was active from 1995–2002.

== Formation ==
The band formed at Tomfest 1995 and was a side project of the Blamed's Bryan Gray. For their debut album, Pride Kills (1996), alongside Jacob Landrau from The Blamed's 21 album, Bryan was filling in for Six Feet Deep at the time and asked Myk Porter to play guitar and SFD had just toured with the Steadfast Records lineup of Zao so they asked Jesse Smith to play drums Jesse Smith (Zao). Despite its members diverse influences, its sound most closely resembled that of the Blamed, the Crucified, and Nobody Special. The band recorded a second album on Flying Tart entitled Serve Self, this was recorded at Neverland Studios in Nashville. The record featured bassist Brent Kaping (Craig's Brother, the Yax), Jim Chaffin (The Crucified, Deliverance) on drums, and guest performances by Jacob (Sometime Sunday) on lead guitar, Chris Colbert (lead guitar), Tracy Street (vocals) Jonathan Peters (vocals), and Cleetus Adrian (vocals). Serve Self was recorded by Chris Colbert again and assisted by Steve Hindalong (The Choir). Left Out recorded a third full length after Bryan moved to Chicago entitled For the Working Class. FTWC featured Bryan and Brent again, and Greg Jacques (Crashdog) on drums. Numerous guest artists made appearances, notably Tim Davis (Spike Nard from Crashdog).

Shortly after the release of FTWC left out toured extensively in support of the record, the live line up featured Bryan, Jason Seiler and Chris and Trevor Wiitala. They did an extensive national tour with Ghoti Hook and the Smiley Kids. Following this tour The Blamed and Left Out merged. Matt Switaj from the Blamed, who had toured with Left Out as well, and Bryan Gray merged with the Wiitala brothers and played for years under the name The Blamed. They had a meeting to decide to merge and they voted on what name to keep and Bryan was the only one who voted for Left Out. The band then played a few shows under the Left Out name performing old songs from Left Out and The Blamed's first two albums, and performed a handful of dates in Europe after the disbandment.

== Reviews ==
Allmusic reports that the band produces "some of the toughest and most energetic Christian music committed to album."

The band shared many members with the Blamed and Crashdog, and at first seemed to be a side project of those bands, but with their second release the group began to innovate their sound. By their third album they had become, in the words of Encyclopedia of Contemporary Christian Music, "more like an actual band" rather that a side project. One track of For the Working Class included Black Willie from the Christian rap group Cauzin' Efekt. One reviewer stated that the track proves that punk and rap don't mix, stating that Willie "sounds like a death metal singer who has been sucking on helium," and called it annoying and unsettling. Lyrically the band was all over the spectrum, attacking everything from smoking to the goth scene.

== Members ==
Last Known Lineup

- Bryan Gray - bass (1995-1996), vocals (1995-2002), guitars (1996-2002)
- Jeff Locke - bass (2002)
- Donnie Anderson - drums (2002)

Former

- Myk Porter - guitars, vocals (1995-1996)
- Darren Diolosa - guitars, vocals (1995-1996)
- Jake Landrau - lead guitar (1995-1996)
- Jacob Christiensen - guitars (1996-1999)
- Matt Switaj - guitars (1999-2002)
- Chris Colbert - lead guitar
- Dan Delay - guitar
- Cleetus Adrian - bass
- Brent Kaping - bass (1996-1999)
- Christopher Witala - bass (1999-2002)
- Jesse Smith - drums (1995-1996)
- Jim Chaffin - drums (1996-1999)
- Greg Jacques - drums (1999)
- Trevor Witala - drums (1999-2002)
- Jason Seiler (1999)
- Brian Porter

== Discography ==
- 1996: Pride Kills (Flying Tart, Review: Cornerstone)
- 1997: Serve Self (Flying Tart, Reviews: Cornerstone, Allmusic)
- 1999: For the Working Class (Grrr Records, Reviews: Phantom Tollbooth, Cross Rhythms link, HM Magazine)
- 2002: Left Out (Review: HM Magazine, 7ball)
