= Six Feet Deep =

American punk and heavy metal band

- Also known as: 6 FT Deep
- Origin: Cleveland, Ohio, U.S.
- Genres: Hardcore punk, Christian hardcore, Christian metal, sludge metal, metalcore
- Years active: 1991–1997
- Labels: R.E.X., A&M
- Past members: Myk Porter; Matt Traxler; Bryan Gray; Tom A. Wohlfield; Mike Shaffer; Matthew Alan Simmons; Johnny Amanse

Six Feet Deep was an American hardcore punk band started in 1991, which became popular in the mid-west United States due to success of their debut album. A review on Cross Rhythms of the band's album, Struggle was a 10/10 review.

== History ==
The band started in 1991, with members Myk Porter, Tom Wohlfield, Matt Simmons, and Mike Shaffer. They recorded their first demo, which was titled Self EP and Struggle with this line-up. Johnny Amanse joined the band for a brief time and decided to leave to spend more time with his family.

Shaffer and Simmons left the band and were replaced by Bryan Gray and Matt Traxler, who recorded on The Road Less Traveled. The band disbanded due to Porter wanting to change the band's musical style. Porter and Traxler later went on to form Brandtson, with Bryan Gray going on to join the Blamed, Left Out, and Blenderhead.

== Members ==
Last known line-up

- Myk Porter – vocals (1991–1997)
- Matt Traxler – guitar (1996–1997)
- Mike Shaffer – guitar (1991–1997)
- Bryan Gray – bass (1996–1997)
- Tom A. Wohlfield – drums, percussion (1991–1997)

Former members

- Matthew Alan Simmons – bass (1991–1996)
- Johnny Amanse – guitar (1994–1995)

Live musicians

- Daren Diolosa – guitar (1994)

== Discography ==
Studio albums

- Struggle (1994)
- The Road Less Traveled (1997)

EPs

- Self EP (1992)
