= Eight Hours Away from Being a Man =

Studio album by Roadside Monument
- Released: June 24, 1997
- Genre: Math rock, emocore
- Length: 49:26
- Label: Tooth & Nail Records
- Producer: Bob Weston

Roadside Monument chronology
Roadside Monument/Puller Split EP (1997)	Eight Hours Away from Being a Man (1997)	Roadside Monument / Frodus Split EP (1997)

Professional ratings
Review scores
Source	Rating
AllMusic	4/5 stars

Eight Hours Away from Being a Man is an album by the math rock band Roadside Monument, released in 1997.

== Critical reception ==
The Arkansas Democrat-Gazette thought that "this three-piece is miles ahead of the competition with their tough and spare tension-release rock songs."

AllMusic wrote: "Starting out with the blistering 'Sperm Ridden Burden' and ending with the groove-laden 'My Hands Are the Thermometers', somewhere in between the listener will find typical math rock fare, but not without its own share of creativity and drive."

== Track listing ==
1. "Sperm Ridden Burden" – 1:45
2. "Eight Hours Away From Being A Man" – 4:10
3. "John Wayne Marina" – 4:50
4. "Sunken Anchor" – 3:02
5. "Iowa Backroads" – 4:16
6. "Kansas City" – 4:34
7. "Tired Of Living With People Who Are Tired Of Living" – 4:03
8. "Compressor District" – 7:12
9. "Apartment Over The Peninsula" – 5:39
10. "Crop Circles" – 5:22
11. "My Hands Are The Thermometers" – 4:33

== Credits ==
- Aaron? – Engineer, Second Engineer
- James Anthony – Artwork, Layout Design
- Jeff Bettger – Organ, Piano
- M. Blosenski – Violin
- Johnathon Ford – Bass, vocals
- Matt Johnson – Percussion instrument, drums
- Douglas Lorig – Guitar, Vocals
- A.W. Reizuch – Lettering
- Bob Weston – Trumpet, Engineer
