= 180 Out =

American Christian punk/rock band

- Origin: Escondido, California
- Genres: Christian punk, Christian rock, pop punk, punk rock, skate punk
- Years active: 2008–present
- Labels: Thumper Punk
- Members: Joe Dukes; Spencer Dukes; Mike Trunnell
- Website: facebook.com/180OUT

180 Out is an American Christian punk and Christian rock band, and they primarily play punk rock, pop punk, and skate punk. They come from Escondido, California. The band started making music in 2008, and their members are vocalist and guitarist, Joe Dukes, vocalist and drummer, Spencer Dukes, vocalist and bassist, Mike Trunnell. Their first release, Send Down Your Love, an album, was released in 2010, independently. The subsequent release, Black & White, a studio album, was released by Thumper Punk Records, in 2012.

== Background ==
180 Out is a Christian rock and pop punk band from Escondido, California. Their members are vocalist and guitarist, Joe Dukes, vocalist and drummer, Spencer Dukes, vocalist and bassist, Mike Trunnell..

== Music history ==
The band commenced as a musical entity in January 2008, with their first release, Send Down Your Love, an independently-made album, that was released in 2010. Their subsequent release, Black & White, was released by Thumper Punk Records, on October 11, 2012.

== Members ==
Current members

- Joe Dukes - guitar, vocals
- Spencer Dukes - drums, vocals
- Mike Trunnell - bass, vocals

== Discography ==
Studio albums

- Black & White (October 11, 2012, Thumper Punk)

Independent albums

- Send Down Your Love (2012, Independent)
