= Creation Festival =

Christian music festivals held in the United States

Coordinates: 40.28516°N 77.91624°W

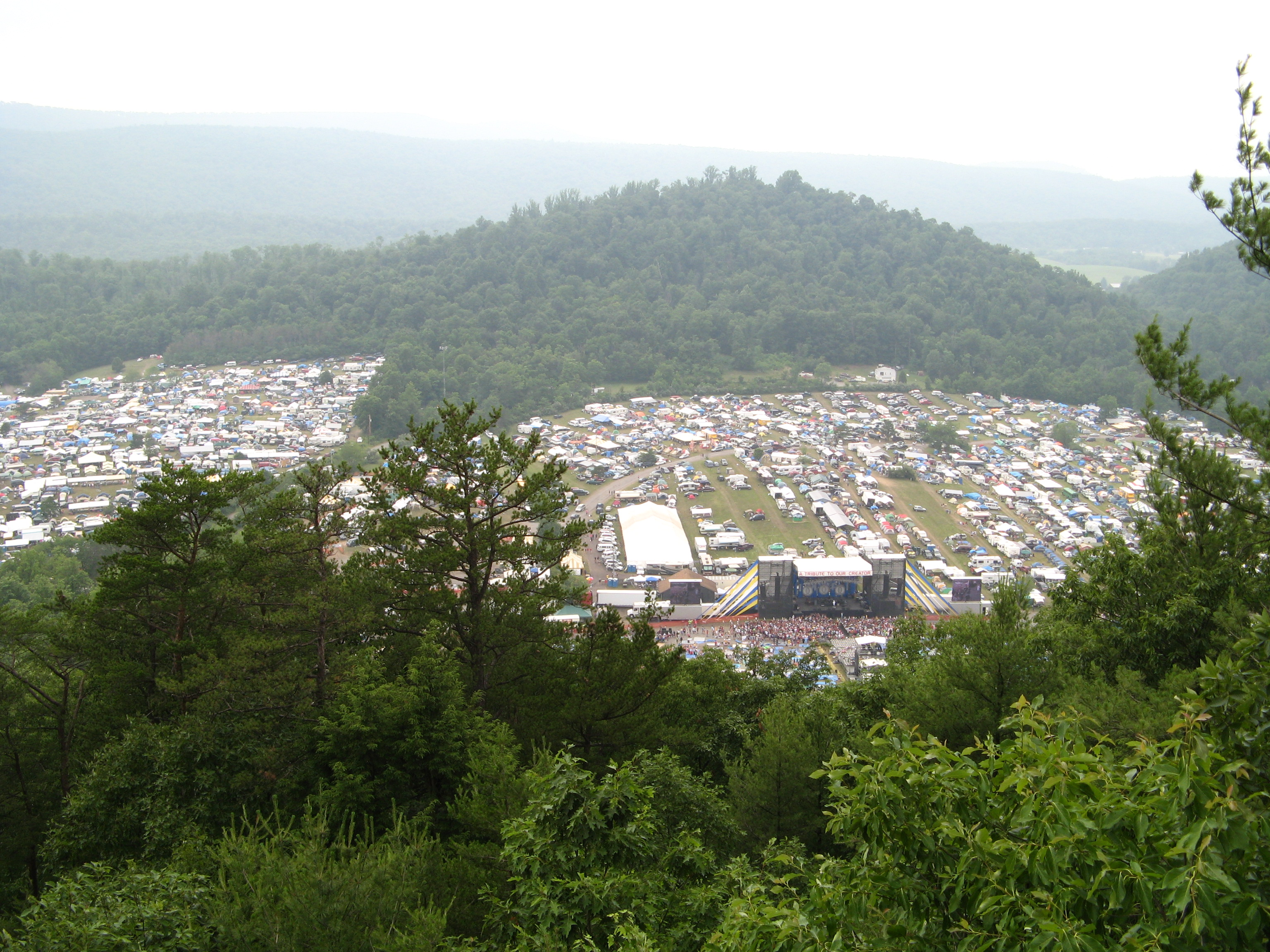
- Creation Northeast 2006
- Genre: Contemporary Christian music
- Locations: Agape Farm; Mount Union, Pennsylvania (Note: The northwest Creation Festival operated at the Benton-Franklin Fairgrounds in Kennewick, Washington.)
- Years active: 1979–2022 (Note: Hiatuses: 1995, 2006, 2020, 2021)
- Founders: Harry Thomas Jr. (died 2022) and Timothy Landis
- Organizer: Come Alive International
- Website: creationfest.com

Creation Festival, commonly shortened to Creation, was an annual four-day Christian music festival in the United States. According to its organizers, it was the "Nation's Largest Christian Music Festival." Average attendance was between 50,000 and 100,000 annually. In late March 2023, the festival's website included a pop-up window announcing the end of the longstanding event, thanking all who had taken part, and providing statistics on the number of people affected over the years. Ticket holders were promised refunds and launch of a "New Vision for 2024" was mentioned.

The four-day festivals hosted more than sixty Christian rock, contemporary, and worship bands. Also featured were Christian speakers and authors, a fringe stage (hosting mostly up-and-coming and/or harder Christian rock bands), children's stage (kids' entertainers geared towards smaller children), Late Nite Cafe, camping, petting zoo, baptisms, communion, fireworks, extreme sports, volleyball, giveaways, candlelight service, prayer tent, youth pastor VIP tent, and other experience-based activities. The festival was a member of the Christian Festival Association. The Creation Festivals were conducted on the basis of purpose, vision, and belief. The festival's main purpose was "To present the Gospel through music, teaching and any other creative means so that those attending will be drawn to salvation and discipleship in Christ." Their vision was for the festival to be a time of prayerful reflection and a time for all attendees, on an individual level, to let Christ into their lives through music, teaching and the spoken word. The overall belief of the Creation Festival was that the lord and savior, Jesus Christ, son of God, died on the cross to take away all of mankind's sin, and then was raised from the dead and given eternal life. Therefore, from the love and mercy given by God, Christians as a people must share the message of Christ.

The festival's slogans were "A Tribute to Our Creator", and "the highlight of your summer... maybe your life."

== History ==
=== Creation Festival (Northeast) ===
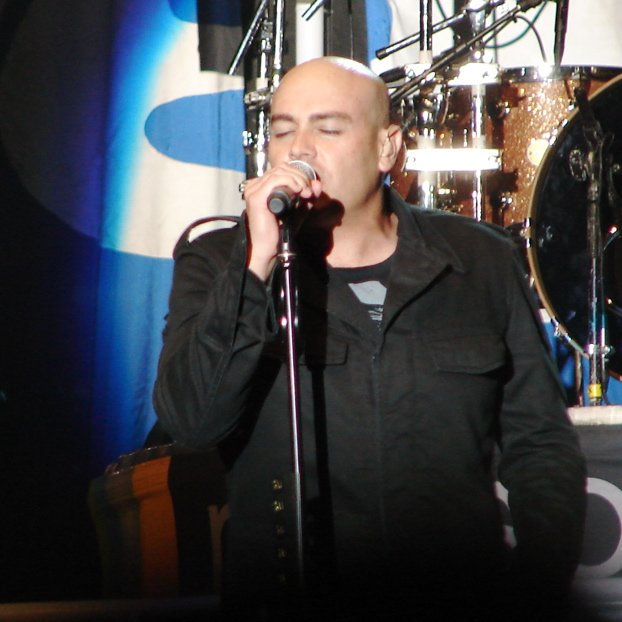
Peter Furler, former lead singer of the Newsboys, performing in 2007

Rev. Dr. Harry Thomas Jr. and Timothy Landis founded Creation East in 1979 in Muddy Run Park in Lancaster County, Pennsylvania. After just five years, the festival outgrew Muddy Run Park and had to change venues. In 1984, the Creation Festival was moved to the Agape Campground in Mount Union, Pennsylvania, when the board of Jesus Ministries offered to rent out the area for the festival. This year was also the first year for a festival-wide Communion, which has since become a yearly tradition.

Creation '88 marked the festival's tenth year celebration with the largest crowd ever to participate in the festival. The 1988 festival concluded with a large fireworks display, which continues to be a memorable part of all Creation Festivals. The first fireworks display at the Creation Festival was in 1983.

In 1992, the festival opened a second stage, "The Fringe Stage". Due to the festival's positive response to the concept of multiple stages, by 1994 both stages were operating continually and in tandem to provide more variety and availability of bands and speakers.

Due to thunderstorms and severe flooding, the festival was canceled in 1995 and 2006. In 1996 and 2003, the festival was held in Hershey, Pennsylvania, with the concerts taking place in the Hersheypark complex arenas. Fans attending the four-day festival were offered a reduced price ticket to Hersheypark and camped alongside a large hill.

In 2008, the festival started an annual tour, passing through more than 30 cities across the U.S.

In 2010, Creation Northeast was held at Agape Farm in Mount Union, Pennsylvania, from June 30 to July 3.

After Tim Landis stepped out of his original role, Rev. Dr. Harry Thomas Jr. continued to be involved, focusing mainly on expanding the ministry of the festival, and passed on the majority of the production and booking to Bill Darpino. Thomas preached a short message at Creation every year.

In December 2017, Thomas was arrested and charged with sexually assaulting minors in Medford Township, New Jersey, over a 16-year period. In February 2018, Thomas pleaded guilty to five counts of sexual assault, and was sentenced in July 2018 to 18 years in prison with no eligibility for parole. Thomas died in prison in April 2022.

The event was postponed in 2020 and 2021 due to the COVID-19 pandemic.

In 2022, Creation Northeast returned to Agape Farm from June 29 to July 2.

=== Creation Northwest (1998–2017) ===
In 1998, the festival expanded to the west with the addition of "Creation Northwest" (a.k.a. Creation West) at the Gorge Amphitheatre in George, Washington. In 2010, Creation Festival Northwest moved to the Enumclaw Expo Center in Enumclaw, Washington. Following the 2013 festival, Creation pulled out of Enumclaw after negotiating a contract for a new venue at the Benton-Franklin Fairgrounds in Kennewick, Washington, starting in 2014.

In January 2018, Creation Festivals announced postponement of the Northwest festival until 2019, with multiple options for those who had already purchased 2018 tickets. Creation Northwest announced in December 2018 their decision to cancel for 2019. Creation Northwest announced in September 2019 via their "creationwest" Facebook page that they would not relaunch in 2020.

=== Other concerts (2014–2016) ===
Creation operated the Sonshine Festival from 2014 to 2016. Citing financial reasons, Sonshine 2017 was paused, with "hope and desire to see [it] return in 2018", according to the festival's webpage.

Creation Festival acquired the rights to the Ichthus Festival in May 2013. As the 2013 concert was cancelled in December 2012, the group planned to host a Creation Ichthus Festival 2014 event. These plans were cancelled on April 12, 2014. Instead, the Creation Ichthus Festival 2015 was held from July 8 to 11, 2015, at the Kentucky Horse Park in Fayette County, Kentucky. Artists included Red, Fireflight, Newsboys, Relient K and more. The Creation Ichthus Festival was discontinued in 2016, and Asbury University acquired rights to the Ichthus name that year, later reviving the Ichthus Festival in 2021.
