= Beside This Brief Hexagonal =

Studio album by Roadside Monument
- Released: April 24, 1996
- Genre: Math rock, Christian rock
- Length: 39:55
- Label: Tooth & Nail Records
- Producer: Kip Beelman

Roadside Monument chronology
My Life is Green (1996)	Beside This Brief Hexagonal (1996)	Roadside Monument/Puller Split (1997)

Beside This Brief Hexagonal is an album by rock band Roadside Monument released April 24, 1996. Its influences include Northwest alternative sound and contemporary emo. One reviewer described it as standing out from other Roadside Monument songs, praising the soft-to-loud crescendos, and the mix of vocals created by the two singers featured.

== Track listing ==
1. "Oh So Fabled" – 3:45
2. "Seed" – 2:48
3. "A Girl Named Actually" – 3:17
4. "Still" – 3:25
5. "Prozac Princess" – 5:45
6. "Lobbyest" – 4:56
7. "Immersion" – 3:02
8. "Greek Tragedy" – 3:56
9. "Boasting In Weakness" – 2:38
10. "Mothered Others" – 6:23
