= The Kings Kids =

American Christian punk band

- Origin: Salinas, California
- Genres: Christian punk, punk rock
- Years active: 2005–present
- Labels: Thumper Punk
- Members: Jason Martinez; Josh Galvan; Lupe Gutierrez; Milo Zavala
- Website: facebook.com/TheKingsKids

The Kings Kids is an American Christian punk band that primarily plays punk rock. Hailing from Salinas, California, the band started making music in 2005, and released Set Sail and Seek…, a studio album, in 2011.

== Music history ==
The band commenced as a musical entity in 2005, with their first release, Set Sail and Seek…, that was released on November 5, 2011, with Thumper Punk Records.

== Members ==
Current members

- Jason Martinez - lead vocals
- Josh Galvan - lead guitar
- Lupe Gutierrez - bass
- Milo Zavala - drums

== Discography ==
Studio albums

- Urgency(June 8, 2008, Self Released)
- Set, Sail and Seek… (November 5, 2011, Thumper Punk)
