= Same as Sunday =

American Christian punk band

- Origin: Indianapolis, Indiana
- Genres: Christian punk, pop punk, punk rock
- Years active: 2005–present
- Members: Chris Bauchle; Kyle Martin; Nick Berry; Andy "the" Heck
- Website: facebook.com/SameAsSunday

Same as Sunday is an American Christian punk band that primarily plays a style of pop punk and punk rock music. They originated in Indianapolis, Indiana, where the band started making music in 2005 with frontman Chris Bauchle. They released two extended plays, called The Dollar for Dollar, in 2009 and Earn Your Stripes, in 2010, which were both independently released.

== Background ==
Same as Sunday is a Christian punk band from Indianapolis, Indiana, where they formed in 2005. Their members are lead vocalist and guitarist, Chris Bauchle, guitarist and background vocalist, Kyle Martin, bassist and background vocalist, Nick Berry, and drummer and background vocalist, Andy "the" Heck.

== Music history ==
The band commenced as a musical entity in 2005, with their first release, The Dollar for Dollar, an extended play, that was released on July 7, 2009, Their subsequent extended play, Earn Your Stripes, was released on October 26, 2010, independently.

== Members ==
Current members

- Chris Bauchle - lead vocals, guitar
- Kyle Martin - guitar, backing vocals
- Nick Berry - bass, backing vocals
- Andy "the" Heck - drums, backing vocals

== Discography ==
EPs

- The Dollar for Dollar (July 7, 2009)
- Earn Your Stripes (October 26, 2010)
- Heroes & Villains (June 2, 2016)
