= Ninety Pound Wuss =

American punk rock band

- Origin: Port Angeles, Washington, U.S.
- Genres: Punk rock, hardcore punk, post-punk, post-hardcore, avant-garde, gothic rock, experimental rock
- Years active: 1994–2000, 2023-present
- Label: Tooth & Nail Records
- Members: Jeff Suffering; Colin Day; Jason Himstedt; Samantha Christine; Mike Green
- Past members: John Spalding (RIP); Marty Martinez; Mike Gizzi; Matt Johnson; Dale Yob; Jiles O'Neal; Matt Nelson; John Himmelberger; Matt Bailey; Sage Parent

Ninety Pound Wuss (sometimes styled as 90 Lb. Wuss) is an American punk rock band formed in Port Angeles, Washington, in 1994. They signed to Tooth & Nail Records in 1995 and released three studio albums over the next five years which would be supported by several national tours. After more than two decades of hiatus, they reunited in 2023 to play a few reunion shows. The band is currently practicing, playing shows, and working on new material.

In the mid-1990s Ninety Pound Wuss established itself as part of the Christian punk scene with their self-titled debut (1996). The release of their second album, Where Meager Die Of Self Interest (1997) saw the band's sound take a dramatic shift, becoming much darker and more dynamically complex. Ninety Pound Wuss continued this development further on their post-punk swan song, Short Hand Operation (1999), by not only displaying an increased use of guitar effects and synthesizers, but also by showcasing some of the strongest songwriting of their career. However, the juxtaposition of being a punk band associated with the Christian music industry proved too exhausting and would ultimately lead to their disbandment in 2000.

== History ==
=== Formation and early years (1994–1996) ===
Ninety Pound Wuss was formed by drummer Marty Martinez, guitarist John Himmelberger and bassist Matt "Gunner" Nelson in Port Angeles, Washington in 1994. Lead vocalist Jeff Suffering joined the band shortly thereafter, and was the only original member left in the band when they disbanded in 1999. After signing with Tooth & Nail Records, Matt "Gunner" Nelson departed and was replaced with bassist Jiles O'Neal, who was also a member of the MxPx side project The cooties. Ninety Pound Wuss released their self-titled debut album in 1996, recorded at Robert Lang Studios in Seattle, Washington with producer Bob Moon. The sessions featured drum tech Yuri Ruley, better known as the drummer of MxPx, who the band toured with and opened shows for. Upon release, Ninety Pound Wuss established the group as part of the Christian punk community with a relatively straightforward punk rock sound that included elements of both hardcore punk and pop punk. This combination of styles can be heard on "Something Must Break", the album's best known song due to compilation appearances and a music video. Lyrically, the album expressed their Christian faith in a somewhat one-dimensional way as compared to later releases, frequently mentioning Christ or Jesus. In 1996, Ninety Pound Wuss issued the Kick You Hard EP which included the newly recorded track "Heresy", as well as borrowing "Misplaced Society" from their debut.

=== Where Meager Die of Self Interest (1997–1998) ===
Ninety Pound Wuss returned to Robert Lang Studios to record their follow-up, Where Meager Die Of Self Interest, with producer Tim Mac who had previously worked with Babes in Toyland, Today Is the Day and Unsane. The album's writing and recording process would take place during a transitional period, with the band undergoing several line-up changes. Dale Yob (The Cootees, Slick Shoes) replaced bassist Matt Nelson prior to recording, while John Spalding took over for guitarist John Himmelberger midway through the sessions. Due to these changes, Suffering began to take a more active role in the band's songwriting. Where Meager Die of Self Interest saw release on October 28, 1997, and differed drastically from their debut, with the music taking on a much darker post-punk dynamic that also introduced the incorporation of Suffering's keyboard work. In addition to these changes, the vocals would become more frantic and inaudible, yet the lyrics still maintained their beliefs with a newfound sense of maturity, as made evident on tracks like "Queen Maggot" and "Sick and You're Wrong". Along with continued touring in 1998, Ninety Pound Wuss contributed the non-album track "In Silence" to Home Alive Benefit Series: Vol. 3, a split EP with The Captives that included an informative zine outlining the Home Alive anti-violence organization.

=== Short Hand Operation and breakup (1999–2000) ===
Prior to their next album, Ninety Pound Wuss would undergo another member change with Matt Johnson (Blenderhead, Roadside Monument) replacing bassist Dale Yob. Shortly after, the band entered Seattle based Avast! Recording Company with producer Steve Kravac, known for his work with Blink-182, Less Than Jake, MxPx and Youth Brigade. The outcome would be their third effort, Short Hand Operation, released on April 22, 1999. The album marked another drastic shift in the band's music by building on the post-hardcore experimentalism and vivid lyrical imagery of their previous offering, with a noticeable increase in both the keyboard playing of Suffering and the guitar effects of Spalding. These factors helped to further evolve the band's post-punk sound, creating the most dynamic album of their career with songs ranging from the chaotic onslaught of "Torment in Tension" and "What I Am" to widely atmospheric tracks like the synth-laden "It Seems So Far Away" and epic album closer "At the End of It All". Satisfied with the final outcome, Suffering referred to Short Hand Operation as "quite possibly ...the best [album] I'll ever record." To support the release, Ninety Pound Wuss embarked on another United States tour.

Throughout their existence, the group had been active in both the Christian and general-market music scenes; however, their growing displeasure of being associated with the Christian music industry began to take its toll on the band. Suffering was uncomfortable with being part of a marketplace that exploited God and religious beliefs for the sake of personal and financial gain. Ninety Pound Wuss tried to reject its association with the industry, which proved unsuccessful in part because Tooth & Nail Records, a predominantly Christian punk label, were contractually owed another album by the band. These circumstances lead to the band's breakup in 2000, with Suffering putting simply, "We had a rough tour and nobody wanted to continue playing in the Christian music industry."

== Other projects and post activity ==
Ninety Pound Wuss issued the posthumous live album Hierarchy of Snakes in 2000. The album, which was likely released to fulfill their contractual obligations with Tooth & Nail Records, included many songs from Short Hand Operation and Where Meager Die of Self Interest. It also featured the Bauhaus cover "Double Dare", as well as the unreleased track "Dead End". Unlike their studio albums which would see release on multiple formats, Hierarchy of Snakes was only available as a limited edition CD.

Members of Ninety Pound Wuss began branching out into other projects towards the final stages of the band and after its breakup. Jeff Suffering, Matt Johnson, and John Spalding formed Raft of Dead Monkeys, who released their debut EP "DBM" in 1999. Johnson left the band in 2000, and was replaced by Davey B. The band followed up "DBM" with Thoroughlev on Burnout Records in 2001. That same year, Suffering organized the group Suffering and the Hideous Thieves, going on to issue several full-length albums, in addition to split releases with Rocky Votolato, The Hush Hush and Discover America. Matt Johnson recorded with The Out Circuit, a project fronted by Nathan Burke (formerly of Frodus) who, like Suffering and the Hideous Thieves, released multiple albums through Lujo Records.

Although Spalding was diagnosed with cancer sometime in 2004, he continued on with a home recording project that came to be known as Loveland, performing the majority of the music himself. Members of Minus the Bear, The Blood Brothers, These Arms Are Snakes and Pretty Girls Make Graves would also contribute to these recordings. After a grueling four-year battle against cancer, Spalding died on November 23, 2008. The Loveland album, The Beautiful Truth, would be released posthumously on Tigre Blanco Records in 2009. Inspired by his music and friendship, Suffering created a blog shortly after Spalding's passing in an attempt to document his own life, which included his ministry at Mars Hill Church in Seattle, where he and Johnson attended and served as pastors.

== Current Activity ==
Ninety Pound Wuss reformed in 2023 to play in Bremerton, WA and at Furnace Fest in Birmingham, AL. DCxPC Live released a vinyl LP from the Bremerton show. YouTube videos were released and songs are on streaming services. The band is currently practicing, playing shows (Seattle, Denver, Oakland, Bremerton), and working on new material.

== Band members ==
=== Current line-up ===
- Jeff Suffering – lead vocals, keyboards (1994–2000, 2023–present)
- Colin Day – guitar (2023–present)
- Jason Himstedt – bass, background vocals (2024–present)
- Samantha Christine - guitar (2026-present)
- Mike Green - drums (2026-present)

=== Final line-up (before 2023 reunion) ===
- Jeff Suffering – lead vocals, keyboards (1994–2000)
- Marty Martinez – drums (1994–2000)
- John Spalding – guitar, backing vocals (1997–2000)
- Matt Johnson – bass guitar (1999–2000) (Ex-Blenderhead)

=== Former members ===
- Jiles O'Neal – bass guitar (1995–1996)
- Matt Nelson – bass guitar (1994–1995)
- John Himmelberger – guitar (1994–1997, 2023)
- Dale Yob – bass guitar (1997–1999)
- Matt Bailey – bass guitar (several years)
- Marty Martinez - drums (1994-2000, 2023-2025)
- Mike Gizzi - guitar (2025)

== Discography ==
Studio albums

- Ninety Pound Wuss (1996)
- Where Meager Die Of Self Interest (1997)
- Short Hand Operation (1999)

Live albums

- Hierarchy of Snakes (2000)
- DCxPC Live Vol. 25, Live at the Tracyton Theater 7/29/23 (2025)

Extended plays

- Kick You Hard (1996)
- Home Alive Benefit Series: Vol. 3 (1998)
