= I Am the Day of Current Taste =

Studio album by Roadside Monument
- Released: September 8, 1998
- Genre: Alternative rock, Christian rock
- Length: 48:37
- Label: Tooth & Nail Records
- Producer: J. Robbins

Roadside Monument chronology
Roadside Monument / Frodus Split EP (1997)	I Am the Day of Current Taste (1998)

Professional ratings
Review scores
Source	Rating
HM Magazine	link

I Am the Day of Current Taste is the final album from math rock band Roadside Monument.

== Track listing ==
1. "I Am The Day Of Current Taste" – 7:01
2. "OJ Simpson House Auction" – 6:29
3. "Taxiriding As An Artform" – 3:50
4. "Cops Are My Best Customers" – 6:25
5. "The Lifevest" – 6:43
6. "Egos The Size Of Cathedrals" – 4:11
7. "This City Is Ruthless And So Are You" – 5:41
8. "Car Vs Semi, Semi Wins Every Time" – 8:17

== Credits ==
- Aaron – Engineer
- Chip – Engineer
- Eric – Engineer
- Jeff Bettger – Keyboards
- Alan Douches – Mastering
- Johnathon Ford – Bass, Vocals
- Matt Johnson – Percussion, Drums
- Douglas Lorig – Guitar, Vocals
- J. Robbins – Producer, Mixing, Organ
