= Lust Control =

Christian thrash punk band

- Lust Control "wearing the mask"

Background information
- Origin: Austin, TX
- Genres: Christian punk, thrash punk, Christian hardcore, Christian metal
- Years active: 1988–1995, 2011–present
- Members: Doug Van Pelt; Mitch Roberts; John Wilson; Phil Borrero
- Past members: Dan Poole; Maury Millican; Paul Q-Peck; Phillip Owens
- Website: lustcontrol.com

Lust Control is a Christian thrash punk band, originally formed in 1988. They are known for their explicit lyrical content, which is devoted to matters of sexual purity and sin, including abstinence, masturbation, pornography, sex ed, and related topics. For their unwavering views on sexual purity, CCM magazine has called Lust Control "the Josh McDowell of the Christian rock world." Musically they have been likened to The Ramones or The Dead Milkmen. The band formed as a joke and was not meant for long term exposure, which has led some to refer to it as a Christian version of Spinal Tap. Lust Control received the title of "The Worst Christian Band of the Decade" for the 1990s from HM.

The band's creators see themselves as performing a legitimate ministry with a message which is often marginalized or poorly approached in churches and completely taboo in contemporary Christian music. For its creators, the goal was to emphasize grace and forgiveness rather than sin; to that end the band offers devotional studies of the topics presented. The band has come under attack from groups on the Christian right, who take issue with their explicit lyrics and musical style. Lust Control has released three albums of original material and an equal number of compilation albums.

== Background ==
The band was originally formed by Doug Van Pelt (editor of HM), Maury Millican (a youth pastor), Philip Owens, and Paul Q-Pek (both of One Bad Pig). Due to the controversial nature of the subject matter, the group maintained an anonymous identity by using pseudonyms and wearing ski masks during performances, a tradition that the band maintained for several years. Although their debut was hastily made, This Is A Condom Nation, received generally positive reviews from mainstream Christian music media sources. CCM magazine found some of their lyrics to be humorous, while Campus Life noted the similarity to One Bad Pig. Both publications, however, were cognizant of the dual message of guilt and grace that the band presented. Even so, the release was dropped by Spring Arbor Christian Bookstores. Lust Control played only one live show with this personnel lineup, at the 1989 Cornerstone Festival.

The impetus for the band in the time following the initial release was primarily Doug Van Pelt. This was due to the fact that One Bad Pig had recently signed to Myrrh Records and its members were contractually blocked from playing in other bands, and Millican had little interest in pursuing a band full-time. The reformed band set about professionally recording an album, which was released as Dancing Naked (1989). During this period the band played some shows and partnered with record labels to bring their material to national availability. Their final album of new material, entitled Feminazi, was released in 1994.

The band has released several compilation albums of sorts, usually involving rereleased or remastered material. Fun, Fun Feeling (Blonde Vinyl, 1991) contained a remastering of selected material from their first two albums, and was their first release to compact disc. Material that was not placed on Fun was rerecorded and released on We Are Not Ashamed in 1992. A limited edition release, The Worst Of... (2000), contains the original selections of the band's complete catalog (including Feminazi), plus a cover of Steve Taylor's "I Blew Up The Clinic Real Good." An enhanced version of We Are Not Ashamed was released in 2006, which included extras such as an audio commentary by Doug Van Pelt and another complete remaster of This Is A Condom Nation.

In 2013, Tiny Little Dots was released on Rottweiler Records, which was engineered by Evan Warren of Refugee, and mixed/mastered by Rocky Gray of Living Sacrifice fame.

== Members ==
Current

- Doug Van Pelt (a.k.a. "Gene") - vocals (1988–1994, 2011–present)
- Mitch Roberts (a.k.a. "Bradford") - guitar (1990–1994, 2011–present)
- John Wilson (a.k.a. "Butch") - bass (1990–1994, 2011–present)
- Phil Borrero (a.k.a. "Bob")- drums (1991–1994, 2011–present)

Former Members

- Maury Millican (a.k.a. "Duane") - bass (1988–1990)
- Philip Owens (a.k.a. "George") - drums (1988–1990)
- Paul Q-Pek (a.k.a. "Stanley") - guitar (1988–1990)
- Dan Poole (a.k.a. "Matt") - drums (1990–1991)

== Discography ==
- 1988: This Is A Condom Nation (Independent, cassette only, Reviews: CCM, Campus Life)
- 1989: Dancing Naked (Independent, cassette only)
- 1991: Fun, Fun Feeling (Blonde Vinyl)
- 1992: We Are Not Ashamed (Enclave, Review: Cross Rhythms)
- 1994: Feminazi
- 2000: The Worst Of...(M8 Records, Reviews: HM, The Phantom Tollbooth)
- 2006: We Are Not Ashamed: Getting It Right the Second Time (Review: The Phantom Tollbooth,)
- 2013: Tiny Little Dots (Rottweiler Records)

== See also ==
- XXXchurch.com
