= Crashdog =

Christian punk band

Crashdog was one of the first Christian punk bands and was active primarily in the early 1990s. Most of their albums were released by Grrr Records, which has also been home to Headnoise, Resurrection Band, and Glenn Kaiser, among others.

Crashdog were known for their very direct lyrics, which they used to make social commentaries and discuss political issues of their day. Their albums included both strongly Christian songs and overtly political songs, often with a left-wing bent. They were one of the first Christian bands to do this; later Christian old-school punk and hardcore bands later followed suit.

After their 1998 release, 8 Years to Nowhere a selection of songs from previous recordings (originally called 8 Years from Nowhere to Nowhere), they decided to go on a one-year hiatus because their drummer, Greg Jacques along with Matt Switaj of The Blamed, was starting a new record label, 2 Jake Records.

Crashdog did reform to do shows for Cornerstone in 2012

== Members ==
- Andrew Mandell - lead vocals (originally played guitar)
- Greg Jacques - drums
- Brian Grover - bass
- Jason Burt - guitar
- Mike Perlmutter - guitar

=== Former members ===
- Spike Nard (born Tim Davis) - lead vocals
- Mike Simicek - bass

== Discography ==
- Hard Knocks for Hard Heads (Grrr records/Rrrough, 1990)
- Humane Society (Grrr recordS/Word Entertainment, 1990)
- The Pursuit of Happiness (Grrr recordS/Word Entertainment, 1993)
- Mud Angels (Grrr recordS/R.E.X. Music, 1994)
- Cashists Fascists and Other Fungus (Grrr recordS/R.E.X. Music, 1995)
- Outer Crust (2 Jake Records/Grrr records, 1997)
- 8 Years to Nowhere (Grrr recordS, 1998)
- Live at Cornerstone 2002 (authorized indie CDR)
