= Sonshine Festival =

- Genre: Contemporary Christian music, Christian Heavy Metal
- Location: Somerset, Wisconsin (previously Willmar, Minnesota 1982–2014)
- Years active: 1982 to 2016
- Website: sonshinefestival.com

Sonshine Festival was a Christian music festival held annually, starting in 1982 in Willmar, Minnesota and continuing in that location through 2014. That same year, festival organizers announced its relocation to Somerset, Wisconsin for 2015 onward because of an inability to attract sufficient people to the original location.

A member of the Christian Festival Association, Sonshine has featured Christian musical artists from around the world. In 2012, the Newsboys recorded their live album Newsboys Live in Concert: God's Not Dead at the festival. Since 2014, Sonshine is produced by Creation Festivals. Citing financial reasons, Sonshine 2017 was postponed, with "hope and desire to see [it] return in 2018", according to the festival's webpage. The festival is indefinitely on hiatus, awaiting the advent of new financial backers.
