= The Blamed =

American Christian hardcore punk band

- Origin: California and Illinois, U.S.
- Genres: Christian hardcore; Christian punk; emo; hardcore punk; punk rock; indie punk
- Years active: 1994–2003, 2012, 2016–present
- Labels: Tooth & Nail, Grrr
- Members: Bryan Gray; Jim Chaffin; Jeff Locke; Sid Duffour
- Past members: Christopher Wiitala; John Hansen; Matt Switaj; Trevor Wiitala; Jeremy Moffett; Glenn Wiley Willis; Jake Landrau; Mark Aceves; Adam Bannister
- Website: facebook.com/TheBlamed

The Blamed is an American Christian hardcore punk band currently based out of Chicago. During their tenure they have played primarily hardcore punk, pop punk, punk rock, and emo music with some influences from metal as well. They originally are from California having relocated to Illinois after guitarist Bryan Gray moved to Chicago. The band originally formed in 1994 and disbanded in 2003. Members during this era of the band included Bryan Gray, Christopher Wiitala, Trevor Wiitala, Jeff Locke, Jim Chaffin, John Hansen, and Matt Switaj. They have released three albums, with Tooth & Nail Records, 21 in 1994, Frail in 1996, and Give Us Barabbas in 2002. The band released four albums, with Grrr Records, ...Again in 1998, Forever in 1999, Germany in 2000, and Isolated Incident in 2001. The band reformed in the summer of 2016 to play a one-off set at Audio Feed music festival. This has since lead to the band reforming and recording a split EP with the Chicago hardcore band The Satire, a band sharing multiple members with the Blamed. The split EP was released in November 2018 through Indivision Music.

== Background ==
The Blamed was a Christian hardcore and Christian punk band from both states of California and Illinois. Their members were during their tenure Brian Gray, Christopher Wiitala, Jeff Locke, Jim Chaffin, John Hansen, Matt Switaj, Chris and Trevor Wiitala.

== Music history ==
The band commenced as a musical entity in 1994, with their first release, 21, a studio album, coming out on May 29, 1996, from Tooth & Nail Records. Their second album, Frail, was released on June 7, 1996, again by Tooth & Nail Records. The group released, ...Again, in 1998, with Grrr Records. The subsequent album, Forever, was released by Grrr Records, on January 1, 1999. Their third album, with Grrr Records, Germany, was released, in 2000. The last album, with Grrr Records, Isolated Incident, was released on January 1, 2001. They signed back with Tooth & Nail, where they released their final album, Give Us Barabbas, on June 7, 2002. The band is reuniting in 2016 at Audio Feed Festival.

== Members ==
Current

- Bryan Gray – guitar (1994–2003, 2012, 2016–present) (formerly with Blenderhead, Left Out, Rocks in Pink Cement, the Satire)
- Jeff Locke – vocals, guitar (formerly with Left Out)
- Sid Duffour – bass (2012, 2016–present) (formerly with Headnoise, Brick Assassin, the Satire, October Bird of Death)
- Jim Chaffin – drums (1994–1999, 2012, 2016–present) (Deliverance, the Crucified, formerly with Left Out, formerly with The Satire)

Former

- Christopher Wiitala – bass (the Wiitala Brothers)
- John Hansen – bass
- Jacob Landrau – guitar, vocals
- Mark Aceves – bass (1994)
- Justin Winokur – guitar
- Matt Switaj – vocals, guitar
- Trevor Wiitala – drums (the Wiitala Brothers)
- Jeremy Moffett – vocals (formerly with Stavesacre)
- Eric Churchill – bass (1994-1996)
- Gary Ottosi – bass
- Aaron Bradford – guitar (1994-1996)

Live musicians

- Jason Seiler – bass (formerly with Headnoise)
- Jason Truby - vocals, guitar (1996) (formerly with Living Sacrifice, P.O.D.)
- Lance Garvin – drums (1996, 1999) (Living Sacrifice, Soul Embraced)
- Glenn Wiley Willis – vocals (2016) (2Minute Minor, October Bird of Death, What's Your Damage)
- Johnny Vasquez – drums (1995) (formerly with Vengeance Rising, formerly with Time Spent Burning)
- James Barnett – drums
- Darren "Klank" Diolosa – guitars (Klank, formerly with Circle of Dust, formerly with Six Feet Deep)

== Discography ==
Studio albums

- 21 (1994, Tooth & Nail)
- Frail (1996, Tooth & Nail)
- ...Again (1998, Grrr)
- Forever (1999, Grrr)
- Germany (2000, Grrr, Burnt Toast Vinyl)
- Isolated Incident (2001, Grrr)
- Give Us Barabbas (2002, Tooth & Nail)
- Split (EP w/The Satire) (2018, Indie Vision Music)
- The Church Is Hurting People (2019, Indie Vision Music)
