= Pocket Change (band) =

American Christian punk band

- Origin: Suffolk, Virginia, United States
- Genres: Christian punk Pop punk
- Years active: 1995–2001
- Labels: Liquid Disc Records; Visual Records
- Members: Tim Asimos; Charles Arnold; Jesse Kaluka; Luke Cotterone
- Past members: Brian "Grover" Saunders
- Website: Official website

Pocket Change was an American Christian punk band from Suffolk, Virginia, United States, that recorded and performed from 1995 until 2001.

== History ==
=== Early days ===
The Suffolk, Virginia-based Christian punk band Pocket Change assembled in January 1995. The band comprised singer/guitarist Tim Asimos, bassist Charles Arnold and drummer Brian "Grover" Saunders. The band began with no real purpose or direction under the name Social Bias, playing covers of bands such as Rancid, NOFX, Green Day, the Offspring and Nirvana. The band began practicing in Asimos' garage, which would remain the band’s rehearsal spot for six years. After attending a Strongarm show in the summer of 1995, the band decided to dedicate themselves to spreading the Christian message through music. With many name changes in the first few months, the band picked the name Pocket Change, while trying to find a name in time to press their five-song demo recorded in December 1995.

=== Getting signed ===
A few months after recording their demo, the band signed with Liquid Disc Records of Nashville, Tennessee. Steadfast, the band's debut release was recorded in August and December 1996. The album was produced by renowned CCM producer Steve Griffith (Audio Adrenaline, Altar Boys) After numerous delays the album was released in May 1997, but did not hit store shelves until the fall. The band did some touring in the Midwest in the summer of 1997, but did not complete a full-fledged tour until the summer of 1998.

=== National tour ===
After graduating from high school in June 1998, the band went back into the studio with Griffith to record their second release for Visual Records. While the band’s message remained intact, the style switched from the pop-punk sound of Steadfast, to a more aggressive, surf-punk sound with heavier riffs and faster drums. After finishing up recording, the band embarked on a 50-date national tour, headlining with Portland, Oregon-based Pep Squad and playing several dates with Spoken. The band played in clubs, churches and coffeehouses throughout the east coast and midwest, and also had performances at such festivals as Cornerstone Festival, Sonshine Festival and Unity Fest. In August, the band returned home to begin college full-time and would resume touring on a part-time basis.

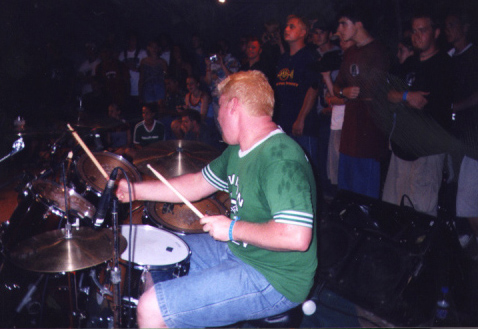
Pocket Change's Brian Saunders performing on tour in July 1998.

=== Second release and radio success ===
Wake Up, the band's second release was completed in December 1998 and would hit shelves in June 1999. The album featured several singles that would receive much attention on CCM rock radio. Take Charge, the band’s first single, climbed as high as number 11 on CCM rock radio, behind such acts as Jars of Clay, DC Talk and the Supertones. The second single, Sometimes, received very similar success, also reaching the number 11 spot on CCM rock radio. After completing a third nation tour in the summer of 1999, the band decided to take an indefinite hiatus and focus their attention on college studies.

=== Lineup changes ===
After almost a year on hiatus, and thoughts of calling it quits, Pocket Change decided to move forward. The band made some lineup changes: Luke Cotturone joined the band to replace Groverrr on drums. A second guitarist, Jesse Kaluka, was added to the band to help form a more progressive and mature sound. The four meshed well and completed a summer of touring including performances at Cornerstone Festival and Sonshine Festival.

=== Final days ===
Pocket Change entered a studio in Virginia Beach, Virginia in August 2000 to record a 2 song demo featuring some of the new songs the four-piece had been working on. Some regard these new songs as the best material the band had ever written. After returning to school in the fall, the band completed spot dates throughout the fall of 2000 and spring of 2001. While the band had hopes of signing to a new label and recording a full-length album, Pocket Change decided to call it quits in the summer of 2001. After six years of performing and recording, and decisions to pursue their college degrees and other careers, the band played their last show in their hometown of Suffolk, Virginia in June 2001.

=== "Out of the Box and Onto the Screen" DVD ===
In the spring of 2005, the band got back together to assemble a 1 hour DVD documentary and relive some of their best memories. The DVD, titled "Out of the Box and Onto the Screen" was self-produced and features behind-the-scenes footage of the band, live concert footage and interviews with all members from 1995-2001.

== Members ==
=== Final lineup ===
- Tim Asimos - vocals, guitar (1995–2001)
- Charles Arnold - bass, backing vocals (1995–2001)
- Jesse Kaluka - guitar, backing vocals (2000–2001)
- Luke Cotterone - drums (2000–2001)

=== Original lineup ===
- Tim Asimos - vocals, guitar (1995–2001)
- Charles Arnold - bass, backing vocals (1995–2001)
- Brian "Grover" Saunders - drums (1995–2000)

== Discography ==
=== Studio albums ===
Year	Title	Label	Format	Other information
1997	Steadfast	Liquid Disc Records	CD	Debut album.
1999	Wake Up	Visual Records	CD	Features the bands newer, less pop-punk sound.

=== EPs ===
Year	Title	Label	Format	Other information
1995	One Side to Every Story	Self-released	Tape	Features early recordings of 3 songs from Steadfast.

=== DVDs ===
Year	Title	Label	Format	Other information
2005	Out of the Box and Onto the Screen	Self-released	DVD	Combination of live concert footage and a documentary of the band.; Features two previously unreleased tracks highlighting the band's new lineup and direction.

=== Singles ===
Year	Title	Album
1997	"I Have Decided"	Steadfast
1997	"Good Feeling"	Steadfast
1997	"My God"	Steadfast
1999	"Take Charge"	Wake Up
1999	"Sometimes"	Wake Up
1999	"Unite to Fight"	Wake Up
