= Nobody Special =

American Christian punk band

- Also known as: NS
- Origin: Orange County, California
- Genres: Christian punk, hardcore punk
- Years active: 1986–1990, 1996–1997, 2011–present
- Labels: Alarma/Frontline, Broken Records
- Members: Pat Nobody; Frank Wesolek (aka "Frank Black"); Rod Reasner; Dave Schad
- Past members: Joey Taylor; Joey Mitchell; Gene Eugene; Chris Brigandi
- Website: www.nobodyspecial.net

Nobody Special was a Christian punk band formed in 1986, in Orange County, California. It consisted of recordings by Pat Nobody and studio musicians Gene Eugene, Joey Mitchell, Chris Brigandi and Joey Taylor. It was a collection of songs from an earlier band Pat Nobody had started in 1980 called Immortal Youth. Immortal Youth band members were Elissa Johnson (keyboard bass) Orlando Gonzalez (drums) and Pat Nobody (guitar and vocals).

After the Frontline Records release of these songs, Pat regrouped and started again as Nobody Special which included Frank Wesolek (aka Frank Black) on lead guitar, Tony Cena on drums, and Chris Kovacs (the Vax) on bass. Nobody Special put out their 2nd recording under the label Broken Records in 1989, which was re-released under the label Wretched Records in 1992.

The band disbanded in 1990, reunited in 1996 and disbanded again in 1997. They reunited again in 2011, with the lineup of Pat Nobody, Frank Black, Rod Reasner and Dave Schad.

== Members ==
Current

- Pat "Nobody" Taylor – rhythm guitar, vocals
- Frank "Black" Wesolek – lead guitar, backing vocals
- Rod Reasner
- Dave Schad

Former

- Chris "The Vax" Kovacs – bass
- Tony Cena – drums, backing vocals

Studio musicians on first recording

- Gene Eugene
- Joey Mitchell – drums
- Chris Brigandi
- Joey Taylor

== Discography ==
Studio albums

- Nobody Special (1987) Alarma/Frontline
- Call It Whatever You Want (1989) Broken Records
