= The Psalters =

US musical group

The Psalters are a Christian band which began in Philadelphia, in 1997. Their music is sometimes described as folk punk. Notable not only for their music, but also for their radical lifestyle, the group is semi-nomadic (at one point living on the road for five years), and functions as an intentional Christian community. The group have labeled themselves as anarchists several times.

Their lineup, which usually features about eight to ten musicians, is constantly changing, though a smaller group of core players have remained consistent long-term members. Over 100 different people have been part of the group at some point.

Most members go by unusual pseudonyms, such as Captain Napkins or Friar Flute Flakes.

== Style ==
Their musical style is based around the consistent use of acoustic instruments. Their compositions are heavily influenced by punk rock, traditional near-eastern music, as well as by other folk traditions such as bluegrass, and klezmer. While they make frequent use of instruments uncommon in American music, such as the bouzouki and kemenche, other, more common instruments, such as the banjo or accordion, are used as well.

Their lyrical themes are generally centered on either the worship of God, or the implications of living out the gospel today. These themes reflect singer Scott Krueger's view that "our Christian walk is supposed to affect every aspect of our lives. So as artists, we want to have that shape our art." Songs about living out the gospel are often political, anti-patriotic, anti-violence, and pro-justice. Their lyrics frequently reference verses from the Bible.

== Discography ==
- Prayers to Be (1998)
- Sya a Ku (2000)
- Inside an Evil Axis (2002)
- us vs us (2004)
- Patrin IV: Live at Joe's (2005)
- Divine Liturgy of the Wretched Exiles (2006)
- Carry the Bones (2011)
