= Headnoise =

American hardcore punk rock band

- Origin: Orange County, California, U.S.
- Genres: Punk rock, hardcore punk
- Years active: 1994-2005, 2011-2012, 2017-present
- Labels: Sofa; Grrr Records
- Members: Edie Goodwin (Vocals); Robert Goodwin (Bass/Vocals); Gilbert Estrada (Drums), Tom Wright ( lead guitar and vocals)
- Past members: Sid Duffour; Casey Logan; Andy LB; Jason Seiler; Levi Nerad; Trevor Holloway; Tom Wright; Todd Snow; Brian Sowers; Max Davis; Mindy Smith-Fischuck; Mike Perlmutter; Honz Cartee; David Sanchez; Orlando Greenhill

Headnoise is a female-fronted hardcore punk rock band. Founded in 1994 in Los Angeles, they have shared the stage with bands such as DI, Agent Orange, Chron Gen, JFA, T.S.O.L., Circle One, 7 seconds, Decry, Shattered Faith, Spider and others. They were on the forefront of the Southern California-based "JCHC" underground movement, along with Officer Negative, following in the footsteps of bands like The Crucified, Nobody Special, and Scaterd Few.

== Musical style and beliefs ==
The band is characterized by faith-based lyrics and guitar-driven, hardcore punk sound. Their music deals with a range of themes including modern pragmaticism, social injustice, personal struggles, and practical spiritual insights.

== Relocation to Chicago ==
Originally based in Los Angeles, California, Headnoise relocated to Chicago in the year 2000 to join "JPUSA" aka Jesus people USA.

== Retirement, reunion and reunification ==
After a decade of touring and releasing five albums, Headnoise announced their retirement in the winter of 2005, citing a desire to focus on their families and other ministry callings. However, the band did re-form shortly thereafter with only the Goodwins as original members. This incarnation lasted from 2011 to 2012, resulting in sparse shows and one short tour. The band never did write and record the long-awaited follow-up release to their last record, For Now We Know In Part:1. Headnoise reformed in 2017 and are playing shows again with a new lineup.

== Original Lineup ==
- Robert Goodwin - bass
- Edie Goodwin - vocals
- Sid Duffour - guitar
- Casey Logan - drums

=== Current lineup ===
- Edie Goodwin - vocals
- Robert Goodwin - bass, backing vocals
- Gilbert Estrada - drums, backing vocals
- Tom Wright - guitar
