= Officer Negative =

American Christian punk band

- Origin: Ventura, California, US
- Genres: Punk, Christian punk, metalcore
- Years active: 1995–2004, 2024–present
- Labels: Screaming Giant, Something Sacred, Solid State
- Members: Chad Wiggins; Daniel Osborn; Ryan Horner; Shawn Cothran
- Past members: Chad Wiggins; Michael Dragon; Chris Sahagun; Josh Handley (Zippy Josh); Taylor Allender; Casey Wisenbaker; Daniel Osborn; Todd Wisenbaker; Joey Buli; Roger Bell; Mark Popovich; Andi Lockwood; Amber Reeves

Officer Negative is a Christian punk band from Ventura, California. Formed in 1995 and initially disbanded in 2000, the band released two albums and an EP on Screaming Giant Records, a record label that was active from 1997-2001. They played "old-school" hardcore punk.

Following a period of reformation, the band reunited and reappeared as "The Death Campaign", touring until 2004, when the group split once again.

In 2024, the band announced that they were reforming with a new lineup and were in the process of writing a new record.

== Background ==
=== 1990s - First two albums / Screaming Giant Records ===
Their first album, Dead to the World (1997), drew influence from 80s/90s street punk and hardcore. It has been described as "angry punk" and likened to acts like Rancid, Black Flag, and Minor Threat.

Their second release, Zombie Nation (1999), was mired in difficulties with their label. The sound of the album deviated from the band's ideal, to the point where its members referred to it as being "not a true representation of the band." Several tracks were cut from the release; two were released the next year as a split EP with Lugnut. The third track, called "Failure to Submit", was described by band member Chad Wiggins as "by far, one of the best songs we have ever written." It was this release which garnered the most attention for the band. The release included the album Live at the Roxy. With the future of the band uncertain at best, HM Magazine referred to this release as the band's "swan song."

In late 1999, the departure of bassist Casey Wisenbaker, along with the band's issues regarding the musical direction of Zombie Nation, led to the dissolution of the band.

=== 2000s - The Death Campaign ===
With the return of Wisenbaker in 2000, the band reformed with new members taking guitar and drums. Vocalist Chad Wiggins saw the reformation of the band as an opportunity to refocus the band on ministry. This lineup toured together until about 2002, releasing an EP and an album. Their 2002 EP Control is an Illusion marked a notable shift towards a new symphonic death metal-based sound, leaving behind much of their original punk influence.

The band rebranded themselves as The Death Campaign, eventually signing to Solid State Records and recording the full-length album which was later released as The Death Campaign Project in 2004.

In the summer of 2003, before the release of the album, the band asked lead vocalist Chad Wiggins to leave, intending for Casey Wisenbaker to take vocals, and hiring bass player Mark Popovich from an Officer Negative side project, the death metal band Akeldama. Within three months of Wiggins' departure, the band once again broke up.

== Associated acts ==
Prior to the release of Zombie Nation, guitarist Josh Handley formed Zippy Josh and the Rag Tag Band, which released one album, Stupidville, in 1999. The album was in the genre of praise and worship music, being described as "the Sex Pistols meet Bob Dylan." Allender and Wisenbaker joined a hardcore band called Hit the Deck, while Wisenbaker, Osborn, and Buli continued to work with Akeldama. Michael Dragon briefly pursued a career in professional skateboarding.

== Present day/Third reunion ==
In July 2024, the band announced that they were reforming, with a new lineup, and were in the process of writing a new record. They performed their first show at JCHC Fest 2024, later joining the lineup for JCHC Fest 2025 and 2026 in subsequent years.

== Members ==
Current lineup

- Chad Wiggins – vocals (1995–2003, 2024–present)
- Daniel Osborn – guitar (2024–present), drums (2000–2003)
- Ryan Horner – drums (2024–present)
- Shawn Cothran – bass (2024–present)

Former members

- Josh Handley – bass guitar (1995–1998), guitar (1998–1999), backing vocals (1995–1999)
- Michael Dragon – drums (1997–2000)
- Chris Sahagan – guitar (1997–1998)
- Casey Wisenbaker – bass guitar (1998–2003), vocals (2003–2004)
- Taylor Allender – guitar (2000–2004)
- Todd Wisenbaker – guitar (2000–2004)
- Joey Buli – guitar (2000–2004)
- Roger Bell – keyboard (2000–2004)
- Mark Popovich – bass guitar (2003–2004)
- Chris Zimmerman – drums (2003–2004)

Timeline

== Discography ==
Studio albums

- 1997: Dead to the World (Screaming Giant)
- 1999: Zombie Nation
- 2004: The Death Campaign Project (Solid State)

Splits and EPs

- 2000: Split EP (with the Combat Junkies)
- 2000: Split EP (with Lugnut)
- 2002: Control is an Illusion (Something Sacred)

Live albums

- 1999: Live at the Roxy
- 2001: Live
