= One Bad Pig =

American Christian punk/metal band

- Origin: Austin, Texas, United States
- Genres: Christian punk; crossover thrash
- Years active: 1985–1994, 2000, 2002, 2005, 2016–present
- Labels: Myrrh, Star Song
- Members: Carey Womack; Paul Q-Pek; Phillip Owens; Daniel Tucek; Lee Haley
- Past members: Brian "Streak" Wheeler; Kevin Phelan; Jon Taylor; Phil Helms

One Bad Pig is an American Christian punk and metal crossover band, formed in Austin, Texas, in 1985. The Encyclopedia of Contemporary Christian Music describes them as "quite possibly the most popular hard-punk act ever to arise within the Christian music scene." They were known for mischief and irreverence on stage, as seen in their reunion at Cornerstone in 2000.

== Background ==
The group evolved out of a street ministry led by Carey Womack, who was studying to become a Baptist minister at the time. Several other members had a background in ministry. Brian Wheeler was an Assembly of God evangelist, and Paul Q-Pek had sung with The Continental Singers. The band formed for a one-time performance at a local Christian music festival on Labor Day 1985. Although they have not released any new albums since 1991, they have written new songs and have not yet declared the band broken up.

Because of the image of the band, the Pig can have a life of its own ... We're totally accountable to our pastors.

According to CCM Magazine, a One Bad Pig show was "kind of like a carnival/revival run amok." At Cornerstone 1990, they were reported to have leapt into water-filled plastic swimming pools and cut down a Christmas tree with a chainsaw. Often during the song "Smash The Guitar", the band would smash their guitars onto the stage. Each performance included an altar call where Womack's preaching was said to have a "hometown passion." The band emphasised personal accountability.

Johnny Cash guested vocals on One Bad Pig's cover of "Man in Black", included on their 1991 album, I Scream Sunday. Bob Hartman performed as a guest guitarist on One Bad Pig's cover of "Judas Kiss" from his band Petra's More Power to Ya album.

God has seen fit to use a very foolish thing to proclaim His message.

The band was criticized by the anti-Christian Rock movement for its concert antics, lyrics, and name. According to some, their name evoked punk stereotypes and rebellion in a way that countered the principles of Christianity. Dial-the-Truth Ministries, affiliated with the King-James-Only Movement, distributed the tract "Christian Rock: Blessing or Blasphemy?" which was critical of the above and their involvement with Cash, who was attacked separately.

In 2016, One Bad Pig reunited to record a new album and play concerts.

=== Origin of name ===
The origin of the band's name was a picture of a pig in a local radio station's advertisement, which Carey commented was one "bad pig". The full story as related in an interview on the "Breakaway Show" (broadcast from radio station KCFV) was that while driving from Austin to the Cornerstone Festival in 1985, Carey and Paul stopped at a Pizza Hut in St. Louis. Local radio station KSHE was running a promotion with Pizza Hut, selling sunglasses with the Pizza Hut logo on one lens and the new KSHE logo on the other. As they were leaving the restaurant, Carey looked at Paul and said "That's one bad pig". Paul replied, "That would be a great name for a punk band! We should form one." So, they did. The next year, One Bad Pig's first album was introduced at Cornerstone.

=== Related activities ===
One Bad Pig was fun, but I couldn't see myself playing punk roots while growing older and putting roots down.

— Paul Q-Pek on leaving One Bad Pig

Paul Q-Pek left the band in 1992 and moved to Nashville. In 1996 he released a solo project entitled Touch the Ground. It contained pop stylings similar to that of Peter Gabriel which were, in the words of the Encyclopedia of Contemporary Christian Music, a "shocking departure from his previous porker rock." The album contained several covers, one of Howard Jones's "Things Can Only Get Better", and Pat Terry's "Open the Door". Original lyrics included political satire in "If I were President" and "Capitol Hill", which CCM commented was "less than successful." The album did however contain some songs which charted on Christian radio: "Touch the Ground" and "Things Can Only Get Better" each reached the No. 10 slot in 1995 and 1996 respectively. "I (Surrender)" reached No. 6 in 1996. He returned to the band for their reunion show at the 2000 Cornerstone festival.

Philip Owens and Paul Q-Pek were also in Lust Control, although their identities were anonymous for the band. This arrangement ended when One Bad Pig signed to Myrrh, as its members became contractually blocked from being in other bands.

== Discography ==
- 1986: A Christian Banned (Review: powermetal.de(German))
- 1989: Smash (Pure Metal)
- 1990: Swine Flew (Myrrh Records, Review: CCM Magazine)
- 1991: I Scream Sunday (Myrrh, Review: powermetal.de (German))
- 1992: Live: Blow Down the House (Myrrh)
- 1994: Quintessential One Bad Pig, Vol. 1 (Diadem)
- 2000: Live at Cornerstone 2000 (One Bad Pig album)|Live at Cornerstone 2000 (M8)
- 2016: Love U to Death

== Members ==
- Carey "Kosher" Womack – lead vocals (often credited as "lead screamer")
- Paul Q-Pek – guitar, vocals
- Paul Roraback – drums, vocals
- Daniel Tucek – bass, vocals
- Lee Haley – guitar, vocals

Former

- Brian "Streak" Wheeler – bass
- Kevin Phelan – bass
- Jon Taylor – drums
- Phil Helms – drums
- Johnny Cash – guest vocals (honorary member)
- Phillip Owens – drums
