= Ballydowse =

American Celtic punk rock band

- Origin: Chicago, Illinois, United States
- Genres: Christian; Christian punk Celtic rock
- Years active: 2003

Ballydowse was an American Celtic punk rock band from Chicago, Illinois, United States, with a rare mix of anarchist and religious ideas infused into their music. Many of the group's members were from the Jesus People USA commune. In addition to the group's Mekons/Pogues-style Celtic punk influences, the group also draws from world musics such as klezmer and Tibetan throat singing.

Ballydowse released two albums both engineered by Steve Albini. The debut was entitled The Land, the Bread, and the People and was a home place for many who found common cause with certain elements of Christianity while rejecting the American right wing bias so prominent in the church at the time. Their second album Out of the Fertile Crescent continued this trajectory with a growing Eastern European flavor. The group's political activism over the economic sanctions on Iraq in the 2000s, prison reform, death penalty and the short-comings of capitalism was unique among Christian bands of the time.

The group disbanded in 2003.

== Discography ==
- The Land, the Bread, and the People (Grrr Records, 1998)
- Out of the Fertile Crescent (Diamante Music Group, 2000)

== Members ==
- Andrew Mandell - vocals
- Robin Mandell - vocals
- Nate Gustafson Peters - vocals, guitar, mandolin
- Craig Holland - guitar
- Brian Grover - bass, didgeridoo, whirligig, bodhran, bullroarer
- Dan Kool - vocals, moohran, bodhran, concertina
- Chris White - drums
- Dave Baumgartner - violin
- Darren Davick - guitar, octave mandolin
- Levi Nerad - drums
- Don Anderson - drums on Out of the Fertile Crescent
