= Jeff Suffering =

American singer

- Birth name: Jeff Bettger
- Origin: Port Angeles, Washington, US
- Genres: Punk, post-punk
- Occupation(s): Musician, pastor
- Instrument(s): Vocals, bass, percussion, piano, guitar
- Years active: 1994–present

Jeff Suffering (born Jeff Bettger), is the former lead singer of Ninety Pound Wuss, Raft of Dead Monkeys, and Suffering and the Hideous Thieves. He also played bass in Team Strike Force, a worship band that was part of Mars Hill Church in Seattle, Washington, US, where he served as a pastor for Biblical Living Arts Ministry until 2013. He later worked on a project called "DRYBNZ" with Joe Mendonca.

== Discography ==
Ninety Pound Wuss

see Ninety Pound Wuss discography

Raft of Dead Monkeys

see Raft of Dead Monkeys discography

Suffering and the Hideous Thieves

- Rocky Votolato split 7-inch (2002)
- Real Panic Formed (2003)
- Double split EP with The Hush Hush (2003)
- Chris Staples split 7-inch (2004)
- Rats in Heaven (2004)
- All my Friends are on Prozac (2005)
- Ashamed (2005)
