= Blenderhead =

American punk rock band

- Genres: Punk
- Years active: August 16, 1992 - 2001, 2016-present
- Labels: Tooth & Nail Records
- Past members: Bill Power; Ed Carrigan; Matt Johnson; Paul Henry; Eben Haase; Tyler Vander Ploeg; Bryan Gray; Flav Giorgini; Bil Repenning
- Website: blenderheadpunk.com

Blenderhead was an American punk rock band signed to Tooth & Nail Records. They released three albums from 1992 to 2001. The band reunited for guitarist Tyler Vander Ploeg's 40th birthday in March 2016.

== Band members ==
Current

- Billy Power - vocals (1992–2001, 2016), Bass
- Ed Carrigan - guitar (1992–2001)
- Tyler Vander Ploeg - guitar
- Paul Henry - bass
- Matt Johnson - drums (1992–2001, 2016)

Former

- Eben Haase - vocals, guitar
- Bryan Gray - guitar (1992; played in The Blamed)
- Flav Giorgini - guitar (Briefly; Currently in Squirtgun)
- Bil Repenning - guitar (1992)

== Albums ==
- Prime Candidate for Burnout (1994)
- Muchacho Vivo (1995)
- EP (1997)
- Figureheads On The Forefront Of Pop Culture (2001)
