= Christian punk =

Genre of punk rock

- Stylistic origins: Christian rock; punk rock; Jesus music
- Cultural origins: Early 1980s, United Kingdom and United States
- Derivative forms: Christian alternative rock

Subgenres
- Christian hardcore

Other topics
- List of Christian punk bands; Christian metal; Christian socialism; Christian communism; Christian anarchism; Religious communism; anarchism and religion; punk ideology; straight edge; liberation theology; Christian feminism

Christian punk is a form of Christian music and a subgenre of punk rock which contain Christian lyrical content. Much disagreement persists about the boundaries of the subgenre, and the extent that their lyrics are explicitly Christian varies among bands. For example, the Crucified explicitly rejected the classification of "Christian punk" while staying within the Christian music industry.

Given the nature of punk and some of its subgenres, such as hardcore punk, many bands have been rejected by the Christian and CCM industry. Christian punk has been deemed novel in that it "seeks authenticity in two differently organized and orientated cultures: secular punk on the one hand and Evangelical youth culture and CCM on the other". Some bands generally avoid specific mention of God or Jesus; likewise some bands may specifically reject the CCM label or express disdain for that niche of the music industry. For example, Ninety Pound Wuss vocalist Jeff Suffering said about the breakup of the band in 2000, "...[N]obody wanted to continue playing in [the] "Christian" music industry."

It has been noted that "measured purely by record sales, Christian punk dwarfs all other religious contributions to the genre". Certain individual Christian punk bands outsold the entire market for the next-largest religious punk genre, Krishnacore.

== History ==
Christian punk originated in the 1980s punk rock scene. The genre has obscure origins. The rise of the Jesus Movement and its cultural institutions, such as Jesus People USA (JPUSA), served as an incubator for various Christian subcultures including punk, in part through JPUSA's label Grrr Records and their annual music festival Cornerstone also referred to as a type of "Christian Woodstock." Crashdog is one characteristically punk band that was rooted in JPUSA. In the 1980s, many bands performed at Chuck Smith's Calvary Chapel in Orange County California. One popular band within that scene was Undercover, who proclaimed that "God Rules", with a combination of rockabilly and hardcore punk elements. Other notable early Christian punk bands included Nobody Special, the Crucified, Scaterd Few, Lust Control and One Bad Pig.

During the 1990s, the underground Christian punk scene grew as bands such as Ghoti Hook, Squad Five-O, the Huntingtons, Slick Shoes, Dogwood, Pocket Change, Officer Negative, Blaster the Rocket Man and Headnoise influenced many of their peers and paved the way for many bands to follow.

In the 21st century, developments in Christian punk have paralleled the broader punk scene. Band such as Relient K, Hawk Nelson, FM Static, Flatfoot 56, Stellar Kart, and This Providence gained popularity with more mainstream audiences.

== Fashion ==
Christian anarchy symbol

Fashion is similar to normal punk fashion, but features Christian symbols such as the Christian Ichthys, the cross, crown of thorns, the JCHC symbol, and similar symbols. Chi Rho is a popular symbol amongst more anarcho-Christian bands, such as The Psalters. In Europe the most used symbol is a modified anarchy symbol made up of the Greek characters A and Ω. These two Greek letters, "Alpha" and "Omega" (the beginning and end of the Greek alphabet), are taken from Revelation 1:8 and when used together in Christian art symbolize that God is eternal, omnipresent, and the giver and taker of life. The symbol is a visual play on the anarchy symbol but with a different meaning and intent.

== Connections to religion ==
Elements of anti-authoritarianism within the punk subculture and in Christianity include challenging the uncritical acceptance of social norms in the church and the world. One illustration of this is seen in the concept of "anticonformity", which can be seen in Christian punk music, including the song "Anticonformity" by Krystal Meyers. Within this perspective, the Christian's view of anticonformity is different from the punk view. The Christian's reason for anticonformity is found in the Biblical Epistle to the Romans: "Do not conform to the patterns of this world, but be transformed." Popular culture is also commented on, or satirized by, Christian punk bands. One of Relient K's most popular songs from their self-titled debut album, "My Girlfriend", contained the line, "Marilyn Manson ate my girlfriend." Calibretto 13 wrote songs critical of MTV, such as "Why Can't I Be on MTV?" and conformity, as in "Sheep of the USA". The Deadlines, likewise, parodied horror film themes on their album The Death and Life Of.... One analysis notes that the "Evangelical authenticity of Christian punk is also predicated on the same anticommercialism of secular punk", which is "not a total rejection of commerce, but an insistence that the music and its spiritual sentiments supersede the profit".

Detractors, however, view punk as anti-religious. Adherence to the practice of Christianity (or any religion, established or not) is, by definition, conformity to rules set forth by someone other than the individual for themself. Because punk is ideologically nihilistic, many view "Christian Punk" as an oxymoron and view it simply as a subgenre of Christian rock and completely separate from punk rock; although Christian punk appropriated punk sound and fashion, no other similarities exist and the two genres have completely isolated origins. Followers of Christian Punk tend to cite punk's individualistic values and argue that punk ideology does not preclude critical and non-dogmatic religious belief.

Some Christian Punks also do not agree with, or are very critical of, organized religion. They say that real Christianity is not just a religion because it's not supposed to be about rituals and rules; attacking these notions of legalism is a common theme in Christian punk lyrics, especially with older Christian punk bands, such as Nobody Special, Ninety Pound Wuss, Scaterd Few, and One Bad Pig. They believe true Christianity is a relationship with Jesus Christ, not necessarily a religion. Many Christian Punks are against religion like other Punks, yet they are strongly in support of a personal relationship with Jesus Christ, separate from rules and tradition. This idea gave rise to Christian punk's term "JCHC", meaning "Jesus Christ Hard Core", which draws its name from an Officer Negative song of the same name.

== Politics ==
Punk rock has strong ties to anarchism and, arguably, with Marxism. Christian punks are not a subculture of Marxism or a form of anarchy or communism, but a subculture with both Christian and punk affiliations. This belief was often held by extreme conservatives during the 1970s and 1980s, however, this was primarily used because of the clash between the King-James-Only Movement and the Jesus Movement. Evangelists such as Jimmy Swaggart associated the Jesus Movement and Christian rock in general as anti-Christian.

The majority of Christian punk bands do not espouse anarchy or communism; Officer Negative's logo is a parody of the Circle-A commonly associated with anarchism. Many Christian punk bands, especially pop-punk bands such as Relient K, FM Static, and MxPx, have very few songs about political topics; others, most notably older bands, contain strongly political lyrics in many of their songs. Political Christian punk bands come from a variety of areas on the political spectrum. The Psalters, who openly advocate the ideas of anarcho-primitivism, liberation theology and Christian anarchism, are Christians who believe God is the only true authority. Showbread (band) have spoken in favor of anarcho-pacifism, Christian anarchism and anti-patriotism as well. Some politicized Christian punk bands are also socialists. Crashdog operated a section of their website devoted to political issues and candidates that they supported, such as former United States Green Party presidential candidate Ralph Nader and various human rights causes. Crashdog disbanded in the late 1990s to start Ballydowse, a more political band which also took strong stances on human rights issues.

Other Christian punk bands take more conservative stances. Calibretto 13's song "America", from their album Adventures in Tokyo, expressed the band's displeasure with America's moral decline. Christian punk bands are also often vocal against abortion in their songs. Rock for Life categorizes bands based on their advocacy for or against abortion; they include many Christian punk bands, such as Dogwood, Flatfoot 56, Relient K, and One-21, on their list.

== Record labels ==
- Alarma Records
- BEC Recordings
- Burnt Toast Vinyl
- Facedown Records
- Five Minute Walk
- Flicker Records
- Flying Tart Records
- Gotee Records
- Mono Vs Stereo
- Rescue Records
- R.E.X. Records
- Tooth & Nail Records

== See also ==
- List of Christian punk bands
- Punk ideology
- Liberation theology
