= Blue Stahli discography =

Bret Autrey's project discography

- Studio albums: 9
- EPs: 1
- Compilation albums: 5
- Singles: 25
- Music videos: 7

Blue Stahli is a Los Angeles-based American electronic rock project that was created by multi-instrumentalist Bret Autrey. He has released nine studio albums, five of which are instrumental based, and the other four are vocal based. He has also released 5 compilation albums, 25 singles and has released 7 music videos. Most singles have been released already onto albums, and there is currently one re-release.

== Albums ==
=== Studio albums ===
Key
Instrumental album
Vocal album

Title	Album details
Antisleep Vol. 01	Instrumental album; Released: December 20, 2008; Label: FiXT, Position; Format: CD, digital download
Blue Stahli	Vocal album; Released: March 2, 2011; Label: FiXT; Format: CD, LP, digital download
Antisleep Vol. 02	Instrumental album; Released: December 9, 2011; Label: FiXT, Position; Format: CD, digit download
Antisleep Vol. 03	Instrumental album; Released: December 18, 2012; Label: FiXT, Position; Format: CD, digital download
The Devil	Vocal album; Released: October 2, 2015; Label: FiXT; Format: CD, digital download
Antisleep Vol. 04	Instrumental album; Released: August 25, 2017; Label: FiXT, Position; Format: CD, digital download
Quartz	Vocal album; Released: October 2, 2020; Label: None; Format: CD, digital download; Part 1 of 3 of the deadchannel_Trilogy
Copper	Instrumental album; Released: November 13, 2020; Label: None; Format: CD, digital download; Part 2 of 3 of the deadchannel_Trilogy
Obsidian	Vocal album; Released: January 15, 2021; Label: None; Format: CD, digital download; Part 3 of 3 of the deadchannel_Trilogy

=== Compilations ===
Title	Album details
ULTRAnumb Remix Compilation	Released: September 21, 2010; Label: FiXT; Format: CD, music download
Anti You Remixes	Released: May 14, 2012; Label: FiXT; Format: CD, music download
So So Bad Remixes	Released: April 23, 2013; Label: FiXT; Format: Music download
Corner / Metamorphosis / Give Me Everything You've Got Remixes	Released: April 30, 2013; Label: FiXT; Format: Music download
B-Sides and Other Things I Forgot	Released: May 7, 2013; Label: FiXT; Format: Music download
Tenacity	Released: December 15, 2017; Label: FiXT; Format: Music download

== Extended plays ==
List of Extended Plays
Title	Album details
Premonitions	Released: August 26, 2016; Labels: FiXT, Position; Formats: digital download

== Singles ==
Title	Year	Album
"Kill Me Every Time"	2008	Blue Stahli
"Scrape"	2008	Blue Stahli
"ULTRAnumb"	2009	Blue Stahli
"Throw Away"	2009	Blue Stahli
"Anti You"	2009	Blue Stahli
"Corner"	2010	Blue Stahli
"Smackdown"	2011	Antisleep Vol.2
"Blue Stahli"	2012	non-album single
"Never Dance Again"	2013	Starlight^{(2017; as Sunset Neon)}
"Ready Aim Fire"	2014	The Devil
"Not Over 'Til We Say So" (featuring Emma Anzai of Sick Puppies)	2015	The Devil
"Metrocenter 84"	2016	Starlight^{(2017; as Sunset Neon)}
"Superhero Showdown"	2016	Premonitions
"Run The Track" ^{(with Nyzzy Nyce)}	2017	Non-album singles
"Shotgun Senorita" (Zardonic Remix)	2017	Non-album singles
"Suit Up" (feat. Southpaw Swagger)	2017	Non-album singles
"Metamorphosis" (lvl Remix)	2017 ^{(re-released, originally "Soknot Lebel Remix")}	Corner/Metamorphosis/Give Me; Everything You've Got Remixes
"Rebel Yell"	2017	Non-album singles
"Lakes of Flame"	2018	Non-album singles
"Death Will Have to Run"	2020	Copper
"Fighter"	2020	Copper
"Prognosis"	2020	Obsidian
"The Mountain"	2020	Obsidian
"Gravity"	2021	Obsidian
"One Last Breath"	2021	Obsidian

Although originally released under the name Blue Stahli, "Never Dance Again" and "Sunset Neon" (of Antisleep Vol.4) are now labeled as both Blue Stahli and Sunset Neon songs. The track "Metrocenter 84" originally released as a single in 2016 under Blue Stahli, however has since been relocated to his project, Sunset Neon. Both "Never Dance Again" and "Metrocenter 84" were released on the Sunset Neon debut album Starlight.

== Remixes and guest appearances ==
Title	Year	Original Artist
"Own Little World" (Remorse Code & Blue Stahli Remix)	2006	Celldweller
"Birthright" (Birthwrong Remix by Blue Stahli)	2008	Celldweller
"Rain Clouds" (Blue Stahli Remix)	2009	Breathing Underwater
"Frozen" (Celldweller vs. Blue Stahli)	2011	Celldweller
"Feed the Monster" (Blue Stahli Remix)	2011	BT & Charlotte Martin
"Shapeshifter" (Blue Stahli Remix)	2011	Celldweller
"Sabotage" (Blue Stahli Remix)	2012	Beastie Boys
"Atom Smasher vs. The Wolf" (Blue Stahli Remix)	2013	Fever Ray
"Carve" (Blue Stahli Reprise)	2013	Josh Money
"Nothing Sacred" (Blue Stahli Remix)	2016	Circle of Dust
"Deviate" (Blue Stahli Remix)	2016	Circle of Dust
"Bed of Nails" (Blue Stahli Remix)	2016	Circle of Dust
"Fanny Pack" (feat. Blue Stahli & Mark Salomon)	2016	Argyle Park
"Yurasuka" (Blue Stahli Remix)	2016	Circle of Dust
"Shout" (Blue Stahli & Sunsent Neon Remix)	2017	Scandroid
"Freaks Me Out" (Blue Stahli Remix)	2018	Collide
"The Show" (feat. Blue Stahli)	2021	X-RL7

== Music videos ==
Title	Year	Album	Director	Link
"ULTRAnumb"	2013	Blue Stahli	Grant Mohrman	
"Crimewave"	2020	Quartz	Bret Autrey	
"Command Line Kill"	2020	Quartz	Bret Autrey	
"Anchor"	2020	Quartz	Bret Autrey	
"Death Will Have to Run"	2020	Copper	Dishondra Hoskins	
"The Mountain"	2020	Obsidian	Bret Autrey	
"Obsidian"	2021	Obsidian	Justin McGrath & Sydney Mills	
