= Wish Upon a Blackstar =

2012 studio album by Celldweller

Studio album by Celldweller
- Released: June 12, 2012; August 25, 2009 (Chapter 01); December 8, 2009 (Chapter 02); July 26, 2010 (Chapter 03); June 27, 2011 (Chapter 04); June 12, 2012(Chapter 05)
- Recorded: 2004–April 2, 2012
- Genre: Industrial rock; drum and bass; electronic rock; alternative rock; trance; electro house; dubstep
- Length: 74:22 (Standard Edition); 148:29 (Deluxe Edition)
- Label: FiXT Music
- Producer: Klayton, Grant Mohrman

Celldweller chronology
Live Upon a Blackstar (2012)	Wish Upon a Blackstar (2012)	Soundtrack for the Voices in My Head Vol. 02 (2010–2012)

Singles from Wish Upon a Blackstar
- 1. "Unshakeable" Released: May 15, 2012; 2. "Louder Than Words" Released: June 26, 2012

Alternative covers
- Deluxe Edition cover

Wish Upon a Blackstar is the second vocal studio album (third overall) from the American electronic rock project Celldweller. While it had been a work in progress since 2004, finalized songs were not issued until mid-2009. The full album was released on June 12, 2012. Grant Mohrman, producer of the debut Celldweller album, returned to co-produce the album with Klayton.

== Production ==
Klayton began to work on the album in 2004, and it was originally slated for release in 2006, though it was ultimately delayed numerous times. In a late 2008 interview, he stated that:

"I would love to just tell everyone 'The album will be done by this date', but I've learned my lesson on that one. It's hard to predict when it will actually wrap up. I can tell you that I am thinking about alternative methods of releasing this album altogether, but I won't say anything until I'm ready to commit... that always gets me in trouble".

On March 9, 2009, Klayton announced that the album would be titled Wish Upon a Blackstar, and he revealed the track listing on April 20, 2009.

In contrast with the debut Celldweller album, where Klayton always tracked the vocals last, Wish Upon a Blackstar was produced vice versa:

"[...] the process for this album is totally different than any other I've done. So, that being said, I've recorded all the final vocals first. That has usually been the last step for me, but I wanted to put more of an emphasis on vocals on this album, so [co-producer] Grant Mohrman and I agreed that I would cut vocals first and build everything else around them".

Klayton later announced that he chose to break up the album into five chapters instead of releasing a standard CD album after all production had wrapped:

"I fully embrace the idea of releasing one song at a time. Waiting years for a full album is cool and all, but times have changed. I can wrap a track in my studio and have it blaring out of your speakers literally the next day if so desired. I had some specific reasons I was planning on releasing [Wish Upon a Blackstar] as a full body of work, but I abandoned that a long time ago when I embraced just how much work I've created for myself with this album. I just don't totally feel right about releasing one song at a time for this album, but I have no intentions of waiting 'til I'm done with the whole thing either. So, I'm releasing the album in Chapters. [...] The fifth and final Chapter will be reserved for the CD, so both the artwork and the [...] remaining songs will be released for the first time on the physical CD".

The first four chapters were released as digital downloads only, and they were available in two editions:

- Standard Edition (includes the songs and a PDF booklet with lyrics, art, and user-submitted art)
- Deluxe Edition (includes songs and their instrumental versions, PDF booklet, and Beta Cessions demo clips of each song through various stages of production)

Originally, there were to be ten songs on the album, but Klayton added seven more to the final CD, namely "Birthright", "The Seven Sisters", "Memories of a Girl I Haven't Met", "It Makes No Difference Who We Are", "The Arrival", and "The Departure" (Deluxe Edition only).

=== Artwork ===
Graphic artist Sam Hayles, who had previously designed the artwork of Soundtrack for the Voices in My Head Vol. 01, was hired again to create "original pieces of art that will be released with each Chapter. Then the art from Chapter 5 will tie together the other 4 images to create a grander single image." The cover art of the Standard Edition was designed by Devin Taylor. Also, Klayton asked Celldweller fans to suggest ASCII-based emoticons to represent each song on the CD artwork.

The concept is very similar to the artwork on the 1977 10cc album, Deceptive Bends.

=== Themes ===
According to Klayton, Wish Upon a Blackstar is a concept album:

"It wasn't originally intended to be but over time it became one. There are very specific running themes throughout. The basic moral is 'be careful what you wish for.'"

=== Music videos ===
Klayton stated that he has decided to produce a music video for "The Lucky One" and that he also considered letting fans film his next live show for the video. Music videos for "I Can't Wait" and "Unshakeable" were also completed, with the "Unshakable" one being released on December 6, 2013.

=== Remixed Upon a Blackstar ===
In an interview, Klayton stated that he would be recruiting remixers to work on tracks from Wish Upon a Blackstar in order to make a separate album, titled Remixed Upon a Blackstar. He later confirmed that BT would be remixing the songs "Louder Than Words" and, Toksin would work on "So Long Sentiment", and J. Scott G. and Joman on "The Best It's Gonna Get", with Imprintz & Kloe. As of mid-2012, only Toksin's remix of "So Long Sentiment" had been released, first on the deluxe edition of Chapter 02 of Wish Upon a Blackstar, then on The Complete Cellout Vol. 01.

=== Blackstar novel ===
American author Josh Viola wrote a science-fiction novel based on the album, titled Blackstar.

== Release ==
=== Chapter 1 ===
Wish Upon a Blackstar: Chapter 01

Studio album by Celldweller
- Released: August 25, 2009
- Length: 21:34
- Label: FiXT Music
- Producer: Klayton, Grant Mohrman

On April 20, 2009, Klayton revealed the track listing for Wish Upon a Blackstar on his official website. On June 4, he released the official lyrics to Chapter 01 ("Louder Than Words", "So Long Sentiment"), along with a fifty-second preview of "So Long Sentiment". On July 13, he posted a video from his iPhone, showing the synth bridge from an unreleased demo of "Louder Than Words", though the segment did not make it to the final cut of the song. On August 4, Klayton announced that Chapter 01 of Wish Upon a Blackstar would become available on August 25, 2009. He also stated that he would show a preview of "Louder Than Words" and the official cover for Wish Upon a Blackstar on August 10. Pre-orders of Chapter 01 began on August 20, 2009, and the two tracks came out on August 25.

Wish Upon a Blackstar: Chapter 01 of 05
No.	Title	Length
1.	"Louder Than Words"	4:38
2.	"So Long Sentiment"	6:07
3.	"Louder Than Words" (Instrumental. Only in Deluxe Edition)	4:40
4.	"So Long Sentiment" (Instrumental. Only in Deluxe Edition)	6:09
5.	"Louder Than Words / So Long Sentiment (Klayton's Commentary)" (Only in Deluxe Edition)	35:56
Total length:		21:34

=== Chapter 2 ===
Wish Upon a Blackstar: Chapter 02

Studio album by Celldweller
- Released: December 8, 2009
- Length: 23:35
- Label: FiXT Music
- Producer: Klayton, Grant Mohrman

On November 10, Klayton announced that Chapter 02 would be released on December 8. On November 25, he posted the cover art on his blog, with the deadline for fan art being December 4. Pre-orders began on December 1, and Chapter 02, which featured the tracks "Eon" and "The Best It's Gonna Get" was released on December 8, 2009.

Wish Upon a Blackstar: Chapter 02 of 05
No.	Title	Length
1.	"Eon"	6:37
2.	"The Best It's Gonna Get"	4:49
3.	"Eon" (Instrumental. Only in Deluxe Edition)	6:40
4.	"The Best It's Gonna Get" (Instrumental. Only in Deluxe Edition)	5:29
5.	"Eon / The Best It's Gonna Get (Klayton's Commentary)" (Only in Deluxe Edition)	32:44
Total length:		23:35

=== Chapter 3 ===
Wish Upon a Blackstar: Chapter 03

Studio album by Celldweller
- Released: July 26, 2010
- Length: 22:58
- Label: FiXT Music
- Producer: Klayton, Grant Mohrman

On May 24, 2010, Klayton released a sample take of "The Lucky One" on his website, allowing fans to submit their vocals as part of a contest to be featured on the album. The deadline for Chapter 03 fan artwork was on June 27. On July 16, Klayton posted the cover art on his blog, and pre-orders began on the same day. Chapter 3, featuring "The Lucky One" and "Tainted", came out on July 26.

Wish Upon a Blackstar: Chapter 03 of 05
No.	Title	Length
1.	"The Lucky One"	6:48
2.	"Tainted"	4:39
3.	"The Lucky One" (Instrumental. Only in Deluxe Edition)	6:50
4.	"Tainted" (Instrumental. Only in Deluxe Edition)	4:41
5.	"The Lucky One / Tainted (Klayton's Commentary)" (Only in Deluxe Edition)	57:21
Total length:		22:58

=== Chapter 4 ===
Wish Upon a Blackstar: Chapter 04

Studio album by Celldweller
- Released: June 27, 2011
- Length: 22:42
- Label: FiXT Music
- Producer: Klayton, Grant Mohrman

On May 11, 2011, Klayton announced that Chapter 04 would be released on June 28, with the art submission deadline being June 15. On May 31, a preview of the song "I Can't Wait" was posted on Celldweller's Facebook page, followed by a preview of "Gift for You" on June 7. Pre-orders of Chapter 04 began on June 14. On June 27, Klayton revealed the full-length versions of the songs on his Ustream profile.

Wish Upon a Blackstar: Chapter 04 of 05
No.	Title	Length
1.	"I Can't Wait"	5:25
2.	"Gift for You"	5:56
3.	"I Can't Wait" (Instrumental. Only in Deluxe Edition)	5:24
4.	"Gift for You" (Instrumental. Only in Deluxe Edition)	5:57
5.	"I Can't Wait / Gift for You (Klayton's Commentary)" (Only in Deluxe Edition)	1:00:19
Total length:		22:42

=== Chapter 5 ===
In early 2011, Klayton tweeted that "2011 is the year of the Blackstar", hinting that the rest of the album would be released by the end of the year. On July 17, he posted the lyrics of "Memories of a Girl I Haven't Met" on his Facebook page. On September 8, he released the lyrics of the intro song and asked his fans to title it. The title was later announced as "It Makes No Difference Who We Are".

On November 24, Klayton announced that the full album would be released on March 27, 2012. However, this was delayed to May 22, due to a new deal with a distribution company.

Pre-orders of Wish Upon a Blackstar were scheduled to go live on March 27, 2012, the same date as the Live Upon a Blackstar Blu-ray DVD was set to be released. However, this was delayed, first to April 17, then to May 22.

The release date of Wish Upon a Blackstar was moved again, to "a final release date in early June, 2012".

On April 2, 2012, Klayton posted a 20-second preview of "Blackstar", celebrating the completion of the album.

On April 18, the final release date of the album was announced for June 12, with pre-orders beginning on May 4. This would also include a 2-CD limited edition of Wish Upon a Blackstar, with instrumental versions of all the tracks. The radio edit of "Unshakeable" came out as a free download on May 15.

On April 30, Klayton announced a Deluxe Limited Edition, with a continuous mix and a "different sequence from main album release, with custom transitions & all".

On May 3, pre-orders were delayed once again. On May 4, Klayton posted the cover art of the album, with two versions—one for the Standard Edition and one for the Deluxe Edition.

On May 8, Klayton stated that pre-orders of Wish Upon a Blackstar would go live on May 15. On May 22, the track "Eon" was posted as a free download on Revolvermag, and on May 31, the radio edit version of "I Can't Wait" was made available for free on Noisecreep.

On June 12, Wish Upon a Blackstar came out. It debuted at No. 7 on the iTunes US Electronic Album Chart, and it reached No. 2 on June 19.

== Reception ==
Professional ratings
Review scores
Source	Rating
Allmusic	2.5/5 stars
Fearnet	(positive)
Melodic.net	4.5/5 stars
Terrorizer	5/5 stars

The album was met with mostly positive reviews from music critics. Miranda Yardley from Terrorizer stated that: "You cannot begin to accuse Celldweller of being a one-trick pony and on the other hand, each track is distinctly their work. Klayton is a true musical mastermind of the 21st Century." Gregory Burkart from Fearnet praised the album, stating that "Wish Upon a Blackstar is an impressive example of Celldweller's evolutionary skills – adopting, adapting and rising above the genres that play a part in it." Pär Winberg from Melodic.net praised the record as well: "new album is amazing and real damn good. It is more synth and electronica than the previous work, yet also more progressive. And raw. And melodic. And, incredibly well produced and well performed". In a less positive review, Fred Thomas from Allmusic said that, "While the heavy production sounds by turns crisp or brutalizing, even the most exciting moments can't save the album from its cheesy lyrics and played-out musical choices, which are as abundant as its moments of legitimate excitement."

== Track listing ==
Standard Edition
No.	Title	Length
1.	"The Arrival"	0:35
2.	"Unshakeable"	5:14
3.	"Blackstar"	4:10
4.	"Eon"	6:36
5.	"Louder Than Words"	4:38
6.	"Memories of a Girl I Haven't Met"	1:05
7.	"I Can't Wait"	5:24
8.	"Gift for You"	5:56
9.	"The Lucky One"	6:48
10.	"The Seven Sisters"	3:45
11.	"Birthright"	5:15
12.	"It Makes No Difference Who We Are"	3:29
13.	"The Best It's Gonna Get"	4:49
14.	"So Long Sentiment"	6:07
15.	"Tainted"	4:39
16.	"Against the Tide"	5:53
Total length:		74:22

Deluxe Edition Disc One
No.	Title	Length
1.	"The Arrival"	0:35
2.	"It Makes No Difference Who We Are"	3:03
3.	"Blackstar"	4:07
4.	"Louder Than Words"	4:41
5.	"The Lucky One"	6:47
6.	"Unshakeable"	5:09
7.	"I Can't Wait"	5:24
8.	"Eon"	6:23
9.	"So Long Sentiment"	6:09
10.	"Gift for You"	5:47
11.	"The Seven Sisters"	3:40
12.	"The Best It's Gonna Get"	5:21
13.	"Memories of a Girl I Haven't Met"	1:01
14.	"Birthright"	5:21
15.	"Tainted"	4:33
16.	"Against the Tide"	5:50
17.	"The Departure"	1:00
Total length:		74:51

Deluxe Edition Disc Two
No.	Title	Length
1.	"Unshakeable (Instrumental)"	5:16
2.	"Blackstar (Instrumental)"	4:12
3.	"Eon (Instrumental)"	6:40
4.	"Louder Than Words (Instrumental)"	4:38
5.	"Memories of a Girl I Haven't Met (Instrumental)"	1:07
6.	"I Can't Wait (Instrumental)"	5:24
7.	"Gift for You (Instrumental)"	5:55
8.	"The Lucky One (Instrumental)"	6:50
9.	"The Seven Sisters (Instrumental)"	3:46
10.	"Birthright (Instrumental)"	5:15
11.	"It Makes No Difference Who We Are (Instrumental)"	3:31
12.	"The Best It's Gonna Get (Instrumental)"	5:29
13.	"So Long Sentiment (Instrumental)"	6:09
14.	"Tainted (Instrumental)"	4:41
15.	"Against the Tide (Instrumental)"	5:54
Total length:		74:37

Note: In addition to the track listing being different between both editions, the deluxe edition (disc one) is a continuous mix with no pause between tracks.

== Outtakes from the Wish Upon a Blackstar sessions ==
Between forty and fifty songs were demoed in the writing sessions for Wish Upon a Blackstar. Klayton explains:

"I approached the new Celldweller disc differently than any other album I've written. I just focused on writing songs I liked, and not so much on the ear candy and production as much – that would come later. So I ended up with almost twice as many songs that didn't make the new CD than ones that actually did make it."

Klayton has stated that many of these songs that did not end up on the album proper will make up the bulk of a second official Beta Cessions collection:

"In fact The Beta Cessions II (when I ever get around to working on those tracks) will be primarily new material and not a bunch of remixes and alternative versions of songs from the sophomore Celldweller album".

Based on the song titles mentioned in interviews and news postings, the following tracks are known to be outtakes from Wish Upon a Blackstar:

No.	Title	Length
1.	"Uncrowned"	4:26
2.	"Shapeshifter" (feat. Styles of Beyond)	3:37
3.	"Tragedy" (Bee Gees Cover)	3:48
4.	"The Way She Wants to Die" (2005 Demo)	4:48
5.	"Blood from the Stone" (2005 Demo)	3:01
6.	"Waiting" (2005 Demo)	4:23
7.	"IRIA" (2005 Demo)	4:22
8.	"Molasis"	TBA
9.	"Atmospheric Light" (2004 Demo)	3:14
10.	"06-06-06" (2006 Demo)	2:59
11.	"Waiting for So Long" (2006 Demo)	1:32
12.	"Spacestation" (2006 Demo)	2:41
13.	"Buzzsaw" (2006 Demo)	4:04

"Uncrowned" was written in 2000 and is actually an outtake from the debut Celldweller record that Klayton has claimed would appear on or with the second album. It was finally released with the re-issue of the debut Celldweller album, on June 10, 2013. Two singles issued in anticipation of Wish Upon a Blackstar, "Shapeshifter" and "Tragedy", did not appear on the album and also ended up on the Celldweller re-issue.

=== Groupees promotions ===
On May 4, 2011, "Atmospheric Light" was released on the Groupees Unreleased EP in a 72-hour exclusive sale on Groupees after reaching the goal of $6,000, and on October 26, Klayton released it as a free download for reaching 100,000 likes on his Facebook profile.

On October 26, 2011, it was announced that a demo of "IRIA" would be issued if the Groupees Halloween Trick or Treat charity event earned over $5,000. If it earned over $10,000, then an acoustic version of "It Makes No Difference Who We Are" would also be released. In the end, it reached the $5,000 goal, and "IRIA" came out on November 1.

On October 26, 2012, another Groupees campaign was launched. On November 14, at the end of the campaign, donors unlocked a new three-song EP, Groupees Charity Fundraiser, with demo tracks that were intended for Wish Upon a Blackstar. These were "Waiting (2005 Demo)", "Blood from the Stone (2005 Demo)", and "06-06-06 (2006 Demo)".

=== Beta Cessions (Demos Vol 01.) ===
On December 23, 2011, the Beta Cessions (Demos Vol 01.) EP was released, featuring "IRIA (2005 Demo)" and both the vocal and instrumental versions of "Atmospheric Light (2004 Demo)".

The demo songs released during the Groupees promotions were to be re-released on the second disc of the 2-CD deluxe edition of the Celldweller debut album 10th-anniversary reissue.

=== Demo Vault ===
In February 2014, Klayton started a YouTube series, Demo Vault, through which he could release Celldweller-related demos. This included "The Way She Wants to Die" as well as two previously unknown outtakes: "Spacestation" and "Buzzsaw".

All three were formally released on May 30, 2014, as part of Demo Vault Vol. 01.

== Personnel ==
Celldweller

- Klayton – vocals, synthesizers, guitar, bass, percussion, songwriting, production, mixing, editing, mastering, programming

Additional personnel

- Bret Autrey (Blue Stahli) – eastern melodies on "So Long Sentiment", additional vocals on "It Makes No Difference Who We Are" and "The Lucky One"
- John London Whitney – drums on "I Can't Wait", "Blackstar", "Birthright", "The Seven Sisters", and "Against the Tide"
- Tom Salta – orchestration and choir recording on "Birthright"
- John Pregler – additional chorus guitar on "So Long Sentiment"
- Jason Waggoner – additional acoustic guitar on "The Best It's Gonna Get"
- Cellmate Worldwide Mass Choir – additional vocals on "The Lucky One"
- The Celldweller Detroit Mass Choir – additional vocals on "It Makes No Difference Who We Are"
- Christina Wheeler (XINA) – female vocals on "So Long Sentiment"
- Jenny Jackknife – female vocals on "Gift for You"
- Ryan Boelster – additional vocals on "It Makes No Difference Who We Are" and "The Lucky One"
- Josh Danforth – additional vocals on "It Makes No Difference Who We Are"
- Terry Desperance – provided drum kit
- Ken Capton – provided drum kit
- Will Callender – bass guitar

Additional production

- Grant Mohrman – production, mixing, photography
- Tom Baker – mastering
- Brian Gardner – mastering
- Bret Autrey (Blue Stahli) – additional editing on "Louder Than Words", "Eon", and "The Lucky One"
- Steve Dresser – additional editing on "So Long Sentiment"
- Josh Danforth – additional editing on "I Can't Wait"
- Ryan Boelster – additional editing on "I Can't Wait" and "Blackstar"
- Derek Steele – additional editing on "The Best It's Gonna Get", "The Lucky One", and "Tainted"

Artwork and packaging

- Sam Hayles (Dose Productions) – artwork (Chapters 1–4, Deluxe Edition) and merchandise design
- Devin Taylor – artwork design (Standard Edition)
- Chuck Wheeler – original photo for Standard Edition artwork
- Paul Udarov – modelled the 3D planet for Standard Edition artwork
- Miranda – "Elara" model
- Karen I Trims & Togs – "Elara" wardrobe
- Natalie Jenkins – Eyewear
- Christina Travis and Jillian Johns – Hair/makeup

== Licensing ==
- "Eon" was used in the 2010 video game Dead Rising 2.
- "The Best It's Gonna Get" was used as the intro music of the 2012 Bojangles' Southern 500 NASCAR race. The "J Scott G & Joman Remix" of the song (from The Complete Cellout) was used in the 2012 How I Met Your Mother episode "Twelve Horny Women".
- "I Can't Wait" was used in the 2012 video game KickBeat.
- "It Makes No Difference Who We Are" was used in the promo of the 2012 Vampire Diaries episode "We'll Always Have Bourbon Street".
