= B-Sides and Other Things I Forgot =

Compilation album by Blue Stahli
- Released: May 7, 2013
- Genre: Electronic rock, alternative metal, drum and bass, trance, trip hop
- Length: 32:39
- Label: FiXT

Blue Stahli chronology
Antisleep Vol. 03 (2012)	B-Sides and Other Things I Forgot (2013)	The Devil (2015)

B-Sides and Other Things I Forgot is a compilation album by American multi-genre project Blue Stahli, released on May 7, 2013. The album is composed of cover songs, outtakes from Blue Stahli's Antisleep album series, and alternate versions of previously recorded songs.

== Track listing ==
All tracks are written by Bret Autrey.

No.	Title	Length
1.	"Takedown (XINA Version)"	3:00
2.	"Kill Me Every Time (South American Slam edit)"	1:02
3.	"The Pure and the Tainted"	2:04
4.	"Burning Bridges" (Early make of 'Anti You' with different lyrics.)	3:29
5.	"Celebrity Mashup"	2:12
6.	"Rebellion Anthem"	2:12
7.	"Fashionista"	2:13
8.	"Scrape (Acoustic)"	2:55
9.	"Kill Me Every Time (Hypnotic Mix)"	5:12
10.	"Ghost of Love (David Lynch cover)"	2:55
11.	"This Will Make You Love Again (IAMX cover)"	4:39
12.	"ULTRAnumb (Mariachi Version)"	0:46
Total length:		32:29
