= Cyber World =

Cyber World: Tales of Humanity's Tomorrow
- Author: Edited by Jason Heller and Josh Viola
- Cover artist: Aaron Lovett
- Language: English
- Genre: Science fiction, cyberpunk
- Publisher: Hex Publishers
- Publication date: November 8, 2016
- Publication place: United States
- Media type: Print (paperback eBook)
- Pages: 250 pp
- ISBN: 978-0-9964039-1-7

Cyber World: Tales of Humanity's Tomorrow is a science fiction/cyberpunk anthology edited by Hugo Award-winner Jason Heller and Joshua Viola published on November 8, 2016 (Election Day). It is the second anthology from Hex Publishers, preceded by Nightmares Unhinged, and aims to re-brand the cyberpunk genre.

== About ==
Cyber World: Tales of Humanity's Tomorrow is a science fiction anthology edited by Jason Heller and Josh Viola with twenty short stories by award-winning and bestselling authors, including Saladin Ahmed, Nisi Shawl, E. Lily Yu, Cat Rambo, Matthew Kressel, Paolo Bacigalupi, Minister Faust, Stephen Graham Jones, Alyssa Wong, Keith Ferrell, and many others. Richard Kadrey wrote the book's foreword and Chuck Wendig and Warren Ellis provided blurbs, praising the collection. The book received a starred review from Publishers Weekly, who said the book expands the "already-fluid definition of cyberpunk". The book also features a companion soundtrack primarily composed of music by Klayton, who records as Celldweller, Circle of Dust, and Scandroid. There are also two tracks by Mega Drive.

== Release details ==
- 2016, United States, Hex Publishers ISBN 978-0-9964039-1-7, Pub date November 8, 2016, Trade paperback

== Reception ==
Booklist reviewer Alan Keep wrote that "this very strong anthology succeeds in bringing new energy and perspectives to the genre, and will be of interest to readers who enjoy cyberpunk or science fiction in general".

Alex Good of the Toronto Star praised the book's "lively and imaginative stories" for bringing readers into the cyberworld. In a starred review, Publishers Weekly called the anthology an "outstanding collection" with "a myriad of characters and styles".
