= The Complete Cellout =

The Complete Cellout Vol. 1

Remix album by Celldweller
- Released: December 15, 2011
- Recorded: 2008–2011
- Genre: Electronica, dubstep, drum and bass, breakbeat, trance, electronic rock
- Length: 52:01
- Label: FiXT Music
- Producer: Klayton; Bret Autrey

Celldweller chronology
Groupees Unreleased EP (2011)	The Complete Cellout Vol. 1 (2011)	Live Upon a Blackstar (2012)

Singles from The Complete Cellout
- 1. "Goodbye (Klayton's 2012 Mix)" Released: October 18, 2011

Alternative covers
- The Complete Cellout Vol. 01 Instrumentals cover

Professional ratings
Review scores
Source	Rating
COMA Music Magazine	(Favorable)

The Complete Cellout Vol. 1 is a remix album by the American electronic rock project Celldweller, which is essentially a compilation of old and new remixes by Klayton himself, Blue Stahli, Drivepilot, Josh Money and many others. It was released alongside Blue Stahli's Antisleep Vol. 02 on December 16, 2011. The instrumental version of the album, titled The Complete Cellout Vol. 01 Instrumentals was released on June 25, 2013.

== Track listing ==
All songs written by Klayton.

No.	Title	Length
1.	"The Complete Cellout"	0:41
2.	"Goodbye (Klayton's 2012 Mix)"	4:58
3.	"Eon (Drivepilot Remix)"	4:11
4.	"Own Little World (Klayton's We Will Never Die Mix)"	4:39
5.	"Louder Than Words (Bare Remix)"	3:20
6.	"Frozen (Celldweller vs. Blue Stahli)"	5:02
7.	"I Can't Wait (Josh Money Remix)"	4:14
8.	"Birthright (Birthwrong Remix by Blue Stahli)"	2:30
9.	"The Best It's Gonna Get vs. Tainted"	6:05
10.	"Shapeshifter (Blue Stahli Remix)"	4:00
11.	"The Best It's Gonna Get (J Scott G & Joman Remix)"	6:13
12.	"So Long Sentiment (Toksin's Anhedonia Mix)"	6:08

== Licensing ==
- "The Best It's Gonna Get (J Scott G & Joman Remix)" was used in the How I Met Your Mother episode, Twelve Horny Women.
