= The Devil (album) =

- Chapter 1 cover; Chapter 2 contains a blue version of the cover. The full album contains the pitchfork itself.

Studio album by Blue Stahli
- Released: October 2, 2015 (full album); December 17, 2013 (Chapter 01); July 29, 2014 (Chapter 02)
- Recorded: 2013–2015
- Genre: Electronic rock, alternative metal, industrial metal
- Length: 44:39 (Full Album); 9:43 (Chapter 01); 10:16 (Chapter 02)
- Label: FiXT
- Producer: Klayton, Bret Autrey, Joey Sturgis

Blue Stahli chronology
B-Sides and Other Things I Forgot (2013)	The Devil (2015)	Antisleep Vol. 04 (2017)

Singles from The Devil
- 1. "Ready Aim Fire" Released: July 15, 2014; 2. "Not Over 'Til We Say So" Released: February 16, 2015

The Devil is the fifth studio album by American multi-genre project Blue Stahli, and the second vocal album following Blue Stahli. It was released in chapters, the first of which was released on December 17, 2013. The full album was released on October 2, 2015. The album features guest appearances from Australian musician Emma Anzai of Sick Puppies and American singer Mark Salomon.

== Production and release ==
Work on the album began as early as April, but the album was announced on November 14, when the cover art was released via Facebook, it was revealed that the album would be released in chapters, with two songs per chapter, much like Celldweller's Wish Upon a Blackstar. In an interview, Autrey stated that he wanted to finish and release the album in 2014, but ended up releasing it at a later date.

=== Chapter 01 ===
On May 31, "Down In Flames" and "The Fall" were confirmed as songs for a new vocal album, and were completed on November 7. Details for the first chapter were later released on November 14, and both songs were confirmed to make up the first chapter, they were made available for pre-order on November 19 and were finally released on December 17.

All tracks are written by Bret Autrey.

No.	Title	Length
1.	"Down in Flames"	4:08
2.	"The Fall"	3:48
3.	"The Fall (Premonition)"	1:47

Deluxe edition bonus tracks
No.	Title	Length
4.	"Down in Flames (Instrumental)"	4:08
5.	"The Fall (Instrumental)"	3:48

=== Chapter 02 ===
Bret confirmed as of April 4, 2014, that the two tracks from Chapter 2 were finished, with both tracks being confirmed as "Enemy" and "Ready, Aim, Fire". In an episode of "Ask Blue Stahli" titled "Ambience", he announced that a new track, later revealed to be "The Beginning", for the second chapter was completed and awaiting release. On June 25, it was announced that Chapter 2 would be released on July 29, 2014, the track listing for Chapter 2 was released two days later. Chapter 02 was released on July 29, 2014, as planned.

No.	Title	Length
1.	"The Beginning"	1:53
2.	"Ready Aim Fire"	3:05
3.	"Enemy"	3:50
4.	"Enemy (Premonition)"	1:27
5.	"Enemy (Wildpuppet Remix)"	5:04
6.	"Enemy (OCTiV Remix)"	4:36
7.	"Ready Aim Fire (Chiptune Mix by Animattronic)"	3:05
8.	"Ready Aim Fire (Instrumental)"	3:05
9.	"Enemy (Instrumental)"	3:50
10.	"Enemy (Wildpuppet Remix Instrumental)"	5:04
11.	"Enemy (OCTiV Remix Instrumental)"	4:36

=== Full album ===
In late August, Bret mentioned working on a new track, "Not Over 'Til We Say So", that would appear on the album. On October 10, in a "Stahlivision" video, Bret revealed that "Not Over 'Til We Say So" was almost done, and that Emma Anzai of Sick Puppies had contributed bass and vocals to the track. It was later released as a single on February 16, 2015.

In an episode of Ask Blue Stahli titled "Sing Like a Lady", he conceded that Chapter 02 was "the last chapter for this album", and that he was now working on releasing the remainder of The Devil as soon as possible.

Vocal work for the album was complete on July 20, 2015, and the tracklist was being arranged.

== Track listing ==
All tracks are written by Bret Autrey.

No.	Title	Length
1.	"The Beginning"	1:46
2.	"Not Over Til We Say So (feat. Emma Anzai of Sick Puppies)"	3:41
3.	"Armageddon"	3:30
4.	"Down In Flames"	4:07
5.	"Enemy"	3:48
6.	"Ready Aim Fire"	3:04
7.	"Rockstar"	3:45
8.	"The Fall"	3:47
9.	"Shoot Em Up"	4:12
10.	"You’ll Get What’s Coming (feat. Mark Salomon)"	3:43
11.	"The Devil"	3:59
12.	"Demon"	4:55
