= Nightmares Unhinged =

- Author: Edited by Josh Viola
- Cover artist: Aaron Lovett
- Language: English
- Genre: Horror
- Publisher: Hex Publishers
- Publication date: September 8, 2015
- Publication place: United States
- Media type: Print (paperback)
- Pages: 280 pp
- ISBN: 978-0-9855590-9-0

Nightmares Unhinged is a horror fiction anthology edited by Joshua Viola, published on September 8, 2015. It is the first anthology from Hex Publishers.

== About ==
Nightmares Unhinged is a horror anthology with 20 short stories by award-winning and bestselling authors, including writers like Stephen Graham Jones, Jason Heller, Keith Ferrell, Steve Rasnic Tem, Edward Bryant, Jeanne C. Stein, Steve Alten and many others. The book is edited by Josh Viola (author of Blackstar (novel) and The Bane of Yoto). "Nightmares Unhinged" is dedicated to Bram Stoker Award-winning author Melanie Tem. The book was named one of the Best Indie Books of 2016 by Kirkus Reviews, where it also received a starred review.

"Spectrum 22", associated with the Spectrum Awards, is featuring the cover art, which was painted by Aaron Lovett.

Viola is the sole author of three stories and the coauthor of two.

== Fear the Walking Dead ==
On December 14, 2016, AMC's The Walking Dead spinoff series, Fear the Walking Dead, announced via social media that Nightmares Unhinged's cover art inspired the show.

== Release details ==
- 2015, United States, Hex Publishers ISBN 978-0-9855590-9-0, Pub date August 11, 2015, Trade paperback

== Reception ==
Clay Evans of the Daily Camera praised the anthology, writing that Steve Rasnic Tem's story is "a boy-meets-girl tale with a creepy twist", Edward Bryant's "Marginal Ha'nts" is "a darkly funny tale that delves into 'lukewarm hauntings'", and Mario Acevedo offers "a funny-scary story that taps into ancient archetypes". He thought that the stories from the anthology's not as well recognized authors are "just as compelling". In a starred review, Kirkus Reviews said the book has "a slew of gloriously disturbing, well-told tales to unnerve readers".

Jim McWilliams, a professor at Dickinson State University, wrote in American Book Review that the anthology "varies widely in the quality of its narratives: from somewhat trite and predictable to genuinely witty and original, from stylistically pedestrian to very well written". He concluded that "it's likely to appeal to most fans of the genre" and that despite thinking "a few of the traditional sort of horror stories to be a bit of slog, [he] enjoyed reading this collection".
