= List of electronic rock artists =

This is a list of electronic rock artists. Bands are listed alphabetically by the first letter in their name, and individuals are listed by first name.

== Notes ==
- ≈ indicates an inducted member of the Rock and Roll Hall of Fame

== 0–9 ==
- 3Teeth
- +44

== A ==
- A Flock of Seagulls
- Anamanaguchi
- The Anix
- Apollo 440
- Awolnation

== B ==
- Battle Tapes
- The Big Pink
- The Birthday Massacre
- The Black Queen
- Blue Stahli
- Bonaparte
- Breathe Carolina
- Brick + Mortar
- Bring Me the Horizon

== C ==
- Camouflage Nights
- ≈ The Cars
- Carpark North
- The Cassandra Complex
- Celldweller
- The Chemical Brothers
- The Chinese Stars
- Chromatics
- Circle of Dust
- Clan of Xymox
- Coldrain
- Cradle of Thorns
- Crosses
- CSS
- Cui Jian

== D ==
- Daft Punk
- Datarock
- Dead by Sunrise
- Deadsy
- Dear Rouge
- Death in Vegas
- Delphic
- ≈ Depeche Mode
- Devo
- Doll Factory

== E ==
- Empire of the Sun
- Enter Shikari
- Esprit D'Air

== F ==
- Factory Floor
- Fatboy Slim
- Filter
- From Ashes to New

== G ==
- Garbage
- Gary Numan
- The Gathering
- Glass Candy

== H ==
- Half Alive
- Health

== I ==
- I Dont Know How but They Found Me
- I Fight Dragons
- I Will Never Be The Same
- Imagine Dragons
- Infected Mushroom
- Innerpartysystem
- In This Moment

== J ==
- Julien-K
- Justice

== K ==
- ≈ Kraftwerk
- The Killers

== L ==
- Ladytron
- LCD Soundsystem
- Le Tigre
- Lights
- Linkin Park

== M ==
- M83
- MGMT
- Moby
- Muse
- Modestep

== N ==
- The Naked and Famous
- ≈ New Order
- Neu!
- ≈ Nine Inch Nails
- NYPC
- Ninja Sex Party

== O ==
- Orgy

== P ==
- Panic! at the Disco
- Pendulum
- The Prodigy
- Powerman 5000
- PVRIS

== R ==
- ≈ Radiohead
- Ratatat
- Republica

== S ==
- Seefeel
- Sextile
- Shiny Toy Guns
- Silver Apples
- Simple Creatures
- Starset
- Stereolab
- Suicide

== T ==
- Tangerine Dream
- Tokio Hotel
- Twenty One Pilots
- TWRP (band)

== U ==
- United State of Electronica

== W ==
- Walk the Moon
- Waterparks

== X ==
- The xx

== See also ==
- List of electronic music genres
- List of synth-pop artists
