= Demo Vault Vol. 01 =

Compilation album by Celldweller
- Released: May 30, 2014
- Recorded: 2004–2011
- Genre: Instrumental rock, electronic rock, industrial metal, trance, electronica, nu metal
- Length: 38:39
- Label: FiXT Music
- Producer: Klayton

Celldweller chronology
| Blackstar (2013) | Demo Vault Vol. 01 (2014) | Demo Vault Vol. 02 (2014) |

Demo Vault Vol. 1 is a compilation album by Celldweller, which consists of demos released through Klayton's weekly YouTube series, "Demo Vault", which has been active since February 2014. It was released on May 30, 2014, and contains all demos released up to that point, including three Wish Upon a Blackstar outtakes.

== Track listing ==
All songs written by Klayton.

| No. | Title | Length |
|---|---|---|
| 1. | "Klay Out West (2005)" | 1:51 |
| 2. | "Ballzout (2005)" | 2:27 |
| 3. | "First Riff with My POD XT (2007)" | 1:05 |
| 4. | "The Way She Wants to Die (2005)" (Wish Upon a Blackstar outtake) | 4:48 |
| 5. | "Take a Guess (2011)" ("Unshakeable" demo) | 0:59 |
| 6. | "Rise Up (2008)" | 1:19 |
| 7. | "Logic Break (2007)" | 2:17 |
| 8. | "Spacestation (2006)" (Wish Upon a Blackstar outtake) | 2:41 |
| 9. | "Acoustic Guitar and a Beat (2007)" | 0:57 |
| 10. | "This Was Written for Someone Else (2005)" | 5:31 |
| 11. | "Lucky (2004)" ("The Lucky One" demo) | 7:26 |
| 12. | "Eve (2005/2009)" | 1:57 |
| 13. | "Breakrift (2007)" | 1:17 |
| 14. | "Buzzsaw (So Much for My Apology) (2006)" (Wish Upon a Blackstar outtake) | 4:04 |
| Total length: | | 38:39 |
