= Antisleep Vol. 03 =

Studio album by Blue Stahli
- Released: December 18, 2012
- Genre: Electronic rock, instrumental rock, drum and bass, dubstep
- Length: 26:21
- Label: FiXT; Position
- Producer: Klayton; Bret Autrey

Blue Stahli chronology
Antisleep Vol. 02 (2011)	Antisleep Vol. 03 (2012)	B-Sides and Other Things I Forgot (2013)

Professional ratings
Review scores
Source	Rating
Sputnikmusic	2.5/5 stars

Antisleep Vol. 03 is the fourth studio album by American multi-genre project Blue Stahli, and the third instrumental-based album, after Antisleep Vol. 01 and Antisleep Vol. 02, pre-orders became available on November 22, 2012, all pre-orders came with "Atom Smasher", the first officially released song on the album, and the full album was released on December 18, 2012.

== Track listing ==
All tracks are written by Bret Autrey.

No.	Title	Length
1.	"Suit Up"	2:25
2.	"Awaken"	1:55
3.	"Retribution"	2:27
4.	"Transmission from Hell"	1:05
5.	"Atom Smasher"	2:17
6.	"The Destroyer of All Things"	3:03
7.	"Something In the Woods"	1:10
8.	"Ready for Battle"	2:45
9.	"Hell Arrives"	2:41
10.	"Reverse Tension"	1:00
11.	"Chaser"	2:11
12.	"Death Hammer"	2:15
13.	"The Ritual"	1:07
Total length:		26:21
