= KickBeat =

2013 music video game

- Developer: Zen Studios
- Publishers: Zen Studios; SCEA
- Platforms: PlayStation 3, PlayStation Vita, PlayStation 4, Xbox One Windows, Wii U
- Release: PlayStation 3, PlayStation Vita; September 3, 2013; Microsoft Windows; January 20, 2014; PlayStation 4, Wii U September 16, 2014; Xbox One; September 26, 2014
- Genres: Music, Rhythm
- Modes: Single-player, multiplayer

KickBeat is a martial arts-themed rhythm action game developed by Zen Studios. The mechanics are similar to those of Gitaroo Man and Dance Dance Revolution, where the player must press a button corresponding to one of four directions at the correct time.

== Gameplay ==
During the game, enemies will come at you from all directions. You must press the direction or corresponding button to where the enemy is attacking. This all takes place to the rhythm of the current song.

== Plot ==
The story of KickBeat starts off with all of the world's music being stolen. It is up to the player to use the remaining 18 songs (the game's soundtrack) to free the rest of the music.

== Song list ==
The game features its own soundtrack, but there is an option in the Steam Edition to import music for further game play. The Special Edition includes a total of 11 artists and 24 songs, with some artists contributing multiple songs.

1. Blue Stahli – "Scrape"
2. Blue Stahli – "Takedown"
3. Blue Stahli – "ULTRAnumb"
4. Celldweller – "I Can't Wait"
5. Celldweller – "Switchback"
6. enV – "Bloom"
7. enV – "Destination"
8. enV – "OCP"
9. enV – "RPM"
10. enV – "Shakestopper"
11. enV – "Vee"
12. Marilyn Manson – "The Beautiful People"
13. Papa Roach – "Last Resort"
14. Pendulum – "Propane Nightmares (Celldweller Remix)"
15. Pendulum – "Self vs. Self"
16. P.O.D. – "Boom"
17. Pre-Fight Hype – "It's Goin Down"
18. Pre-Fight Hype & Southpaw Swagger – "Tug-O-War"
19. Rob Zombie – "Scum of the Earth"
20. Shen Yi – "War Dance"
21. Southpaw Swagger – "It's Showtime"
22. Styles of Beyond – "Nine Thou"
23. Voicians – "The Construct"
24. Voicians – "Fighters"

== KickBeat: Special Edition and KickBeat: Steam Edition ==
KickBeat: Special Edition and KickBeat: Steam Edition are the releases for PlayStation 4, Xbox One, Wii U, and Steam distribution for Microsoft Windows.

== Reception ==
While reviewing the Steam Edition of the game, IGN noted the game had good visuals but were disappointed with the lack of content. Metacritic gave a generally positive aggregated score of 66 based on 7 critics.
