= Live Upon a Blackstar =

Live album by Celldweller
- Released: March 26, 2012 (Audio version); June 12, 2012 (DVD/Blu-Ray)
- Recorded: 2010–2011
- Genre: Electronic rock
- Length: 63:21
- Label: FiXT Music
- Producer: Klayton

Celldweller chronology
The Complete Cellout (2011)	Live Upon a Blackstar (2012)	Wish Upon a Blackstar (2009–2012)

Professional ratings
Review scores
Source	Rating
COMA Music Magazine	(Favorable)

Live Upon a Blackstar is the first live album from the American electronic rock project Celldweller. It includes a Live DVD/Blu-ray with footages taken in the US, Russian, Japanese and Canadian live shows. The full backing videos from the shows are also included on the DVD in High Definition along with "tour diaries, 2 Celldweller music videos and more". Live Upon a Blackstar is also accompanied by an audio-only CD and digital release.

== Release ==
Pre-orders started on February 14, 2012. The audio version was released on March 26, 2012, one day early before the original release date. The DVD/Blu-ray version was delayed first to April 17, 2012, then "due to complex authoring and manufacturing difficulties" it was delayed again, to May 22, 2012. However, on May 22, 2012, the DVD/Blu-ray was delayed to June 12, 2012, and was finally released alongside Wish Upon a Blackstar.

== Track listing ==
No.	Title	Length
1.	"Through the Gates (Live)"	2:36
2.	"The Best It's Gonna Get vs. Tainted (Live)"	5:43
3.	"Frozen (Live)"	4:42
4.	"Own Little World (Live)"	4:30
5.	"Symbiont (Live)"	2:59
6.	"Louder Than Words (Live)"	6:17
7.	"Ursa Minor (Live)"	3:08
8.	"Fadeaway (Live)"	5:52
9.	"So Long Sentiment vs. Eon (Live)"	6:04
10.	"The Lucky One (Live)"	8:48
11.	"Switchback (Live)"	8:15
12.	"I Believe You (Live) (CD Exclusive)"	4:27
Total length:		1:03:21
