= Hex Publishers =

American publishing company

- Founded: 2014; 12 years ago
- Country of origin: United States
- Headquarters location: Erie, Colorado
- Key people: Joshua Viola
- Publication types: Books, E-books
- Imprints: JAM Publishers
- Owner: Joshua Viola
- Official website: hexpublishers.com

Hex Publishers is an independent publishing company based in Erie, Colorado, USA, that specializes in genre fiction including science fiction, horror and dark fantasy, and publishes the online magazine Words, which features free short fiction, movie reviews and author interviews. Hex was founded by Joshua Viola (owner) and Dean Wyant on October 31, 2014, before the company's first release, Nightmares Unhinged. By 2019, Viola had spent over $100,000 on Hex.

== Authors ==
Authors published by Hex Publishers include Carrie Vaughn, Edward Bryant, Steve Alten, Jeanne C. Stein, Kat Richardson, Paolo Bacigalupi, Minister Faust, Stephen Graham Jones, Steve Rasnic Tem, Richard Kadrey, Matthew Kressel, Cat Rambo, Sarah Pinsker, Alyssa Wong, Mike Resnick, Alistair Rennie and E. Lily Yu.
