= Antisleep Vol. 02 =

Studio album by Blue Stahli
- Released: December 9, 2011 (Digital); December 16, 2011 (CD)
- Genre: Electronic rock, industrial metal, instrumental rock, electro-industrial
- Length: 42:10
- Label: FiXT; Position
- Producer: Klayton, Bret Autrey

Blue Stahli chronology
Blue Stahli (2011)	Antisleep Vol. 02 (2011)	Antisleep Vol. 03 (2012)

Singles from Antisleep Vol. 02
- 1. "Smackdown" Released: November 1, 2011

Antisleep Vol. 02 is the third studio album by American multi-genre project Blue Stahli, and the second instrumental-based album, after Antisleep Vol. 01, the digital album was released on December 9, 2011 and the CD was released on December 16, 2011. Like its predecessor, the majority of the tracks are instrumental-based, with the exception of "Let's Go" and "So So Bad".

== Track listing ==
All tracks are written by Bret Autrey.

No.	Title	Length
1.	"Let's Go"	2:35
2.	"Blast Action"	2:15
3.	"Trash Glamour Rock Chick"	2:24
4.	"So So Bad"	2:41
5.	"Smackdown"	2:07
6.	"Rapid Fire"	2:29
7.	"Jet Set"	2:20
8.	"Jackhammer Manifesto"	2:56
9.	"Kiss Kiss Bang Bang"	2:37
10.	"Glitterati"	2:31
11.	"Railgun"	2:22
12.	"Vegas, Baby"	2:29
13.	"Fierce Pop Starlet"	2:30
14.	"Dragstrip Burnout"	2:00
15.	"Slick"	2:50

=== Bonus instrumental tracks ===
No.	Title	Length
16.	"Let's Go"	2:34
17.	"So So Bad"	2:40
