= Jeanne C. Stein =

American urban fantasy author

Jeanne Stein
- Occupation: Novelist
- Writing career
- Pen name: Jeanne C. Stein
- Period: 2006 to present
- Genres: Romance, Fantasy, Paranormal, Erotic Romance, Historical, Speculative fiction, Contemporary, Urban fantasy
- Website: jeannestein.com

Jeanne C. Stein is an American urban fantasy author. She now lives in Colorado, but was raised and educated in San Diego, which is the setting for her contemporary vampire fantasy.

Stein's novels about vampire bounty hunter Anna Strong are published by Ace Books, and as S. J. Harper, the Fallen Siren Series is published by ROC.

== Bibliography ==
Jeanne C. Stein is the national bestselling author of the Urban Fantasy series, The Anna Strong Vampire Chronicles and most recently, The Fallen Siren Series written as S. J. Harper. She is active in the writing community, belonging to Rocky Mountain Fiction Writers, Sisters in Crime and Horror Writers of America. There are nine books in the Anna Strong series and two books and two novellas in a new series written with Samantha Sommersby under the S. J. Harper pseudonym. She also has more than a dozen short story credits, including the novella, Blood Debt, from the New York Times bestselling anthology, Hexed (2011) and The NYT bestselling anthology, Dead But Not Forgotten edited by Charlaine Harris (2014.) Her short stories have been published in collections here in the US and the UK. Her latest, an Anna Strong novella entitled Anna & the Vampire Prince, was recently published by Hex Publishers.

Her books are published in Germany by Droemer/Knaur and Norway (2009).

=== Anna Strong Series ===
==== US titles ====
#	Title	Publication Date	Also In	Comments
1	The Becoming	2006		
2	Blood Drive	2007		
3	The Watcher	2007		
4	Legacy	2008		
5	Retribution	Aug 2009		
5.1	The Witch and the Wicked	Sep 2007	Many Bloody Returns	
5.2	Elizabeth & Anna's Big Adventure	Feb 2010	A Girl's Guide to Guns and Monsters	
6	Chosen	Aug 2010		
6.1	Superman	Jun 2011	Chicks Kick Butt	can be skipped (modified version integrated in the Crossroads book)
6.2	Blood Debt	Jun 2011	Hexed	fills a gap between the books
7	Crossroads	Aug 2011		
8	Haunted	Sep 2012		
8.1	Cloud City	Mar 2013		
9	Blood Bond	Aug 2013		

=== The Fallen Siren Series ===
1. Cursed (2013)
2. Captured (2014)
3. Reckoning (2014
4. Forsaken (2015)

=== Novels ===
- Cloud City, an Anna Strong Novella (2013)
- Wonderland Novella (2014)
- Anna and the Vampire Prince (2017)

=== German titles ===
- Verführung der Nacht (2008)
- Lockruf des Blutes (2008)
- Dunkle Küsse (2009)
- Der Kuss der Vampirin (Aug 2010)
- Blutrotes Verlangen (Feb 2011)

=== Anthologies and collections ===
Anthology or Collection	Contents	Publication Date	Editor	ISBN
Many Bloody Returns	The Witch and the Wicked	2007	Charlaine Harris Jim Butcher Kelley Armstrong	978-0-441-01675-4
At the Scene of the Crime	Better Lucky Than Good	2008	Dana Stabenow	978-0-7867-2055-2
RMFW PRess	Broken Links, Mended Lives	2009	Jeanne C. Stein Susan Smith	
Mammoth Book of Vampire Romance, Vol. II	The Ghost of Leadville	2009	Trisha Telep	978-1-84901-043-6
A Girl's Guide to Guns and Monsters	Elizabeth and Anna's Big Adventure	2010	Martin H. Greenberg Kerrie Hughes	978-0-7564-0614-1
Whedonistas: A Celebration of the Worlds of Joss Whedon by the Women Who Love Him	essay	2011	Lynne Thomas Deborah Stanish	978-1-935234-10-4
Hexed	Blood Debt	2011	Ilona Andrews Yasmine Galenorn Allyson James Jeanne C. Stein	978-0-425-24176-9
Chicks Kick Butt	Superman	2011	Rachel Caine Kerrie Hughes	978-0-7653-2577-8
Vampires: The Recent Undead	The Ghost of Leadville	Mar 2011	Paula Guran	978-1-60701-254-2
Hex in the City	One Good Deed	2013	Kerrie Hughes	978-0-615-78356-7
Dead But Not Forgotten	Love Story	2014	Charlaine Harris Toni L. P. Kelner	978-0-425-27174-2
GalaxyFest 2012 Omnibus	The Wolf's Paw	2012	David C. Z. Wacks	978-1-4700-8895-8
Nightmares Unhinged	The Wolf's Paw	2015	Josh Viola	978-0-9855590-9-0
Georgetown Haunts and Mysteries	Introduction	2017	Jeanne C. Stein Josh Viola	978-0-9986667-6-1
Blood Business	Lunchtime	2017	Josh Viola Mario Acevedo	978-0-9986667-9-2
Blood and Gasoline	Desert Run	2017	Mario Acevedo	978-0-9997736-3-5
