= Unshakeable (Celldweller song) =

Single by Celldweller

from the album Wish Upon a Blackstar
- Released: May 15, 2012; October 22, 2013 (remix)
- Recorded: 2011–2012
- Genre: Electronic rock, drum and bass, dubstep
- Length: 3:03 (Single Edit), 5:14 (Album Version), 5:09 (Deluxe Edition)
- Label: FiXT Music
- Songwriter: Klayton
- Producer: Klayton

Celldweller singles chronology
"Elara" (2012)	"Unshakeable" (2012)	"Louder Than Words" (2012)

"Unshakeable" is an electronic rock single by Celldweller from Wish Upon a Blackstar, it is the second single from the album, and the second Celldweller song to receive airplay (the other being "I Believe You"), the radio edit was released free through Alternative Press and SoundCloud on May 15, 2012.

"Unshakeable" was later remixed by BT and Seamless, and was released as its own single on October 22, 2013.

== Music video ==
An animated video, directed by Josh Viola, was announced on October 20, 2012, in an interview concerning the production of The Bane of Yoto. The video was released on December 6, 2013.

== Track listing ==
No.	Title	Length
1.	"Unshakeable (Radio Edit)"	3:03
2.	"Unshakeable"	5:14

=== BT & Seamless Remix ===
No.	Title	Length
1.	"Unshakeable (BT & Seamless Remix)"	4:00
2.	"Unshakeable (BT & Seamless Remix Instrumental)"	4:00
