= I Will Never Be The Same =

Los-Angeles based music project

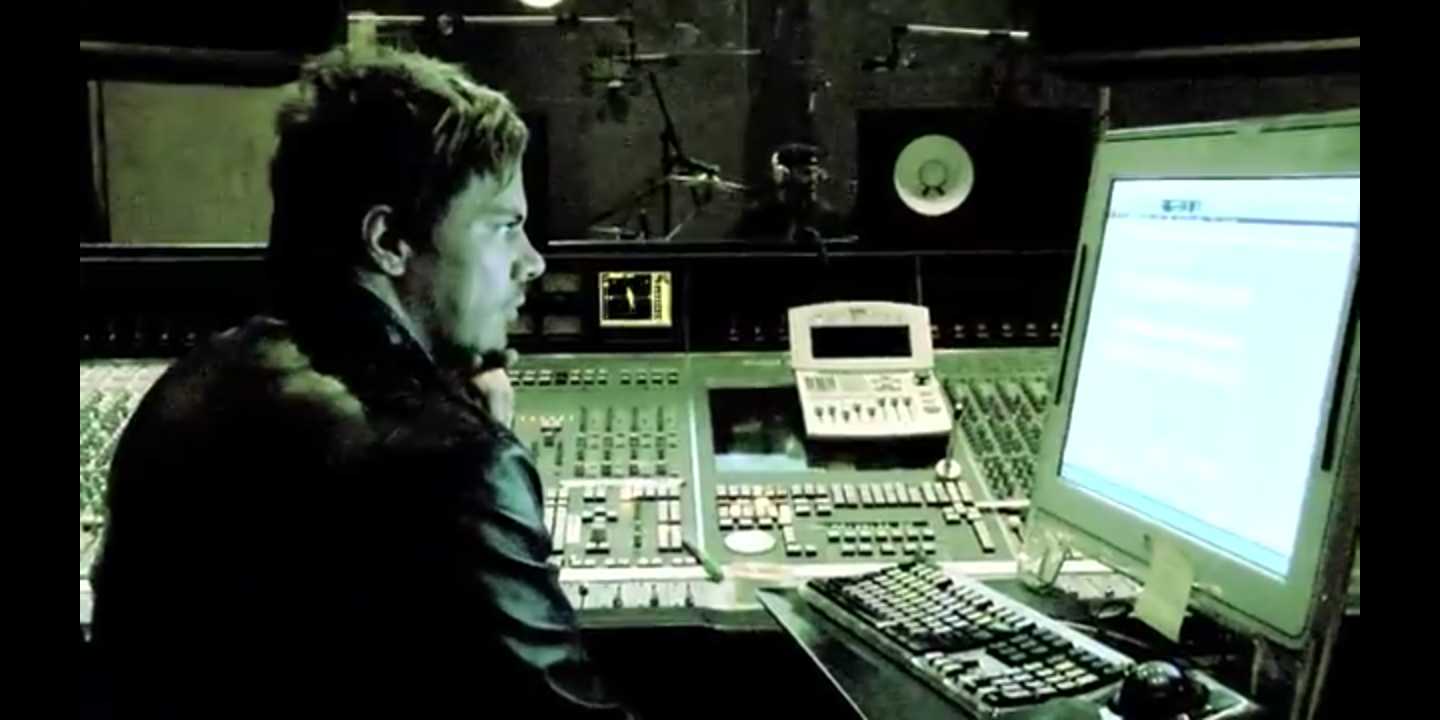
- Atchley in 2009

Background information
- Origin: Los Angeles, California, U.S.
- Genres: Synth-rock; Alternative Rock; Electronic; Spacesynth; Industrial Rock
- Years active: 2008–present
- Labels: Independent releases, FiXT
- Members: Josh Atchley
- Past members: Francis Ten (Bass); Taylor Haycraft (Guitars); Brittany Bao (Keyboard/Synth); Adam Waldon (Drums)

I Will Never Be The Same (sometimes shortened as IWNBTS) is an electronic/synth-rock music project based in Los Angeles, California. It was created by electronic music composer Josh Atchley, who made his debut in 2009 with the album Standby.

== History ==
=== Creation and release of Standby (2009-2011) ===
Although I Will Never Be The Same was created back in 2009, Atchley began working on a solo project from 2008. He said about the creation of his project, "I decided took take time off producing other artists and remixes to do my own album ... (one) that I could potentially turn into a touring band that would showcase my love of rock-based music. I decided to try and start singing and writing lyrics, which was something I had never done before. After a year and a half of writing and experimenting, the end result was IWNBTS."

In 2009, Atchley was working at a record lab as a graphic designer. When he was alone, he would load up his music software and start to work. After 3 months he created the debut album, titled Standby. It was released on April 9, 2009. The album was first released independently and was only digitally distributed.

Standby contained 12 tracks including a cover of "Cry Little Sister", a song by Gerard McMahon. The re-released version has 21 tracks.

A remix competition was held on the song "Worldless". The remixes were released on October 12, 2010, in a compilation album under record label FiXT.

After releasing the debut album, Atchley hired band members- Francis Ten on bass, Taylor Haycraft on guitar (both from West Indian Girl), Brittany Bao on keyboard/synth and Adam Waldon on Drums. They played many local shows in Los Angeles including one on Perishing Square with Dramarama and in The Viper Room . Its songs were also played on Dave Navarro's radio show "Dark Matter". But due to some reasons the other members left.

=== Tornadoes and announcement of The Visitors EPs (2012-2014) ===
During 2012, Atchley had shut down a few offers of some major record deals, only entertaining record label offers because he wanted to tour. He wanted to create a new album.

Taking a break from his usual work, he went to a secluded mid-west U.S. tornado alley area with a portable studio and started making the demos. Within a month, the job was done and he went back to Los Angeles to mix and master the tracks.

The album, ironically named Tornadoes, was first released on 20 February 2012. It originally contained 12 tracks (the re-released version has 22) . The song "Fire Inside" was used in an advertisement of the TV show Penny Dreadful.

In 2014, it was stated that IWNBTS will release two new EPs. The EPs titled Visitors I and Visitors II, according to Atchley, would pave the way for the third studio album.

=== Signing with FiXT (2015-present) ===
In 2015, IWNBTS signed with electronic rock label FiXT. After signing, "Skyhunter", a single from the new EP was released April 7, 2015. The EP was said to be released that summer. The first two albums were re-released under FiXT on December 11, 2015, with new artwork and tracks as both CD and digital download. The EP was said to be released in the summer but didn't come to fruition. On June 17, 2016, a new single from the third album "Forces" was released.

In 2019, Atchley replied to a comment on his YouTube channel that he was working on movies and was not able to work much on the project. But he added that he would take a break to revisit the passion of IWNBTS.

== Discography ==
I Will Never Be The Same has released two studio albums, one remix album, one music video (Worldless) and one lyric video (As My Heart Explodes).

=== Studio albums ===
1. Standby (2009)(re-released in 2015)
2. Tornadoes (2012)(re-released in 2015)
3. The Visitors (TBA)

=== Remix albums ===
1. Worldless (The FiXT Remixes) (2010)

=== Singles ===
1. Fantasy
2. Skyhunter (2015)
3. Forces (2016)
4. Fantasy (Maks_SF Remix) (2019)
