= Legacy of Kain: Soul Reaver – The Dead Shall Rise =

2025 graphic novel

- Date: Fall 2025
- Publisher: Bit Bot Media

Creative team
- Writer: Joshua Viola; Angie Hodapp
- Artist: Juan Samu
- Letterers: Jeremiah Lambert
- Colorists: Zac Atkinson

Legacy of Kain: Soul Reaver – The Dead Shall Rise is a 2025 dark fantasy action-adventure graphic novel written by Joshua Viola and Angie Hodapp with pencil/inks by Juan Samu, colors by Zac Atkinson, letters by Jeremiah Lambert, cover art by Dave Rapoza, Matthew Therrien, and Aaron Lovett, and concept art by Daniel Cabuco, Aaron Lovett, and Juan Samu. The graphic novel is published by Bit Bot Media. A part of the Legacy of Kain franchise, it is a prequel to Legacy of Kain: Soul Reaver featuring Raziel and Kain.

A Kickstarter for the graphic novel launched on August 20, 2024.

== Premise ==
Legacy of Kain: Soul Reaver – The Dead Shall Rise is set prior to the events of Legacy of Kain: Soul Reaver and tells the origins of Raziel, a character voiced by Michael Bell in the Legacy of Kain video game series. The graphic novel also features other characters returning to the franchise such as Kain and Moebius, and introduces new ones such as Elaleth.

== Publication history ==
Legacy of Kain: Soul Reaver – The Dead Shall Rise was announced in July 2024. Music by Klayton (Celldweller) and Matthew Kiichi Heafy of Trivium is part of a soundtrack that accompanies the graphic novel.

== Reception ==
Legacy of Kain: Soul Reaver – The Dead Shall Rise was received poorly by fans, with criticisms directed at the quality of writing and artwork, mis-characterizations and frequent inconsistencies with existing lore - as well as new character, Elaleth, being the focus of the story rather than Raziel and Kain.

The book also received backlash due to the handling of the Kickstarter used to fund the project, raising $1,496,557, with backers criticizing lack of transparency, feeling misled about the direction of the book, being lied to about the status after long stretches of silence and the creators of the project not only using assets developed for it in another work, developed and sold after the kickstarter, but before delivering upon The Dead Shall Rise.

The creators also faced accusations of asto-turfing reviews of the book and related media, using spoofed social media accounts to leave positive reviews.
