= Antisleep Vol. 04 =

Studio album by Blue Stahli
- Released: August 25, 2017 (Full Album); June 5, 2015 (Chapter 01)
- Genre: Electronic rock, instrumental rock, contemporary R&B, funk rock
- Length: 29:28 (Full album); 12:14 (Chapter 01)
- Label: FiXT; Position
- Producer: Klayton; Bret Autrey

Blue Stahli chronology
The Devil (2015)	Antisleep Vol. 04 (2017)	Quartz (2020)

Antisleep Vol. 04 is the sixth studio album by American multi-genre project Blue Stahli, and the fourth in the instrumental Antisleep series. It is the first in the series to be released in "chapters", the first of which was completed and released, as a surprise, on June 5, 2015. The full album, which includes 6 additional tracks, was released on August 25, 2017. This is the last Blue Stahli album to be released by FiXT Music, as he left without any prior announcement.

== Track listing ==
All tracks are written by Bret Autrey.

No.	Title	Length
1.	"Sunset Neon"	2:06
2.	"Headshot"	2:16
3.	"Secret Agent Business"	2:27
4.	"Red Carpet Rush"	3:09
5.	"Dirty Down"	2:15
6.	"Reload"	2:34
7.	"Three Piece Suit"	2:53
8.	"Car Chase Club Action"	2:35
9.	"Rumbleshaker"	1:58
10.	"Stangblack"	1:06
11.	"Futureproof"	3:47
12.	"Lightspeed Combat"	2:22
Total length:		29:28
