= Blue Stahli (album) =

Studio album by Blue Stahli
- Released: March 2, 2011
- Recorded: 2008–2011
- Genre: Electronic rock, industrial metal, alternative metal
- Length: 43:04
- Label: FiXT
- Producer: Klayton, Grant Mohrman

Blue Stahli chronology
| Antisleep Vol. 01 (2008) | Blue Stahli (2011) | Antisleep Vol. 02 (2011) |

Professional ratings
Review scores
| Source | Rating |
|---|---|
| COMA Music Magazine | (Favorable) |
| Reflections of Darkness | 9.5/10 |
| ReGen Magazine | 3.5/5 stars |
| Rock n Reel Reviews | 4/5 stars |

Blue Stahli is the self-titled second studio album and the first vocal album by American multi-genre project Blue Stahli. It was released on March 2, 2011, however, most of the tracks had previously been released as singles. The cover artwork was created by Grant Morhman, the producer of the debut Celldweller album.

An entirely instrumental version of the album was released on January 17, 2012. On November 27, 2018, a deluxe edition of the album was released for vinyl and download. It featured new tracks such as the "ULTRAnumb" acoustic, the Entropy Zero remix of "Doubt" (however it is absent in the vinyl), and the Celldweller remix of "ULTRAnumb". In addition to these new tracks were songs of the album B-Sides and Other Things I Forgot, such as "Burning Bridges" (the alternative version of "Anti-You"), the alternate version of "Takedown" featuring Xina on vocals, the acoustic version of "Scrape", and the mariachi version of "ULTRAnumb".

== Track listing ==
All tracks are written by Bret Autrey

| No. | Title | Length |
|---|---|---|
| 1. | "ULTRAnumb" | 4:25 |
| 2. | "Scrape" | 4:46 |
| 3. | "Anti You" | 3:29 |
| 4. | "Doubt" | 3:58 |
| 5. | "Corner" | 4:52 |
| 6. | "Takedown" | 2:55 |
| 7. | "Kill Me Every Time" | 5:11 |
| 8. | "Throw Away" | 5:57 |
| 9. | "Metamorphosis" | 4:37 |
| 10. | "Give Me Everything You've Got" | 2:49 |
| Total length: | | 38:59 |

Bonus tracks

| No. | Title | Length |
|---|---|---|
| 11. | "Scrape (Acoustic)" | 3:02 |
| 12. | "Smackdown" | 2:06 |
