= Scrape (Blue Stahli song) =

Single by Blue Stahli

from the album Blue Stahli
- Released: 16 December 2008
- Recorded: 2008
- Genre: Industrial metal; electronica
- Length: 9:32
- Label: FiXT
- Songwriter: Bret Autrey as Blue Stahli
- Producer: Bret Autrey

Blue Stahli singles chronology
"Kill Me Every Time" (2008)	"Scrape" (2008)	"ULTRAnumb" (2009)

"Scrape" is the second single by Blue Stahli.

== Track listing ==
1. Scrape – 4:47
2. Scrape (Instrumental) – 4:45

== Licensed appearance ==
"Scrape" is used in a TV spot for the film Armored.

"Scrape" is also used in the hit video game Dead Rising 2 in the Psychopath boss fight against Sgt. Boykin.

"Scrape" was also used in the trailer for the movie Sucker Punch in 2011. It was used in the trailer for one of the characters in the movie, Sweet Pea.

"Scrape" was used in a tv spot for the film Colombiana.

"Scrape" was used in a promo for The CW series Arrow.

"Scrape was used in a trailer for the movie Premium Rush.

"Scrape" is a playable song in the video game KickBeat.
