= ULTRAnumb =

Single by Blue Stahli

from the album Blue Stahli
- Released: May 5, 2009
- Genre: Industrial metal; alternative metal; electronica
- Length: 4:26
- Label: FiXT
- Songwriter: Bret Autrey
- Producer: Klayton

Blue Stahli singles chronology
"Scrape" (2008)	"ULTRAnumb" (2009)	"Throw Away" (2009)

"ULTRAnumb" is the third single by the American multi-genre project Blue Stahli. It remains as Blue Stahli's most popular song to date. A music video for the song was released on 7 February 2013.

== Overview ==
ULTRAnumb is characterised by heavy use of guitars and modified vocals in tandem to layers of smooth harmonies. The song was produced by Klayton of Celldweller and mixed by Klayton and Bret. The female vocals in song are credited to Beth.

== Music video ==
The song's accompanying music video features Blue Stahli in a pool full of blood, two women gossiping and having a beating human heart at a picnic, smashing it into a chunky mess and covering themselves in its blood, a choreographed dance with leathered suits and sand, and a short Celldweller guest appearance. The video was directed by Grant Mohrman.

== Track listing ==
1. ULTRAnumb - 4:26
2. ULTRAnumb (Instrumental) - 4:14
3. Crunkline (ULTRAnumb Demo) - 0:43 [Deluxe Edition Only]

=== ULTRAnumb Remix Compilation [Deluxe Edition] Track Listing ===
1. ULTRAnumb - 4:25
2. ULTRAnumb (Deep Field Drammar mix by Noise to Noizer) - 4:46
3. ULTRAnumb (Neonvision Remix) - 5:41
4. ULTRAnumb (Klonopins And Needles mix by Suynthetic Killing Unit) - 4:04
5. ULTRAnumb (Drum Style Mix By Greenox) - 5:47
6. ULTRAnumb (Exterminated Remix By Exterminated) - 5:05
7. ULTRAnumb (Metal Revision By Paul Udarov) - 3:36
8. ULTRAnumb (Unknown Remix By Gokay) - 4:19
9. ULTRAnumb (Feed Me More Mix By Animattronic) - 3:11
10. ULTRAnumb (Dragon From The West Mix By Billdisc) - 5:14
11. ULTRAnumb (Synoise Remix By Synoise) - 3:42
12. ULTRAnumb (MacHinnes Percocet Mix By MacHinnes) - 4:09
13. ULTRAnumb (Violated By Neon Sky) - 3:44
14. ULTRAnumb (Jato Unit-Hard Trance Radio Remix) - 5:02
15. ULTRAnumb (Lie Breath Mix By Echodeep) - 3:50
16. ULTRAnumb (Violated Remix By Armored Defiance) - 5:03
17. ULTRAnumb (Tweakerray Remix By Tweakerray) - 4:01
18. ULTRAnumb (Enslavement Mix By Pulsedaemon) - 4:06

== Song's Usage ==
"ULTRAnumb" appears in the trailer for From Paris With Love and in the 2010 movie, Jonah Hex.

"ULTRAnumb" was used in a promo for The CW series Arrow, along with the video game KickBeat.

Beginning with the 2016–2017 season, the Philadelphia Flyers played "ULTRAnumb" before the start of home games.
