= The Dead Channel Trilogy =

- Quartz album cover

Studio album by Blue Stahli
- Released: October 2, 2020 (Quartz); November 13, 2020 (Copper); January 15, 2021 (Obsidian)
- Recorded: 2018–2020
- Length: 32:00 (Quartz); 27:23 (Copper); 38:06 (Obsidian)
- Producer: Bret Autrey

Blue Stahli chronology
Antisleep Vol. 04 (2017)	The Dead Channel Trilogy (2020)

Singles from Obsidian
- 1. "Catastrophe" Released: January 13, 2021; 2. "Obsidian" Released: February 3, 2021

The Dead Channel Trilogy (stylized as deadchannel_Trilogy) is a trilogy of studio albums by American multi-genre project Blue Stahli, consisting of the project's seventh, eighth, and ninth albums (if including the instrumental Antisleep series). The albums, titled Quartz, Copper, and Obsidian, were released on October 2, November 13, 2020, and January 15, 2021, respectively; the first independent releases in Blue Stahli's history.

== Background and promotion ==
Obsidian was written before Quartz and Copper, and it was originally planned to be a standalone album. On September 13, 2018, the single "Lakes of Flame" was initially released for the album. Obsidian was originally slated for a 2019 release with "Lakes of Flame" as the lead single, but due to Autrey's departure from FiXT Music, it was later moved to 2021, with "Lakes of Flame" becoming a non-album single.

Eventually, Quartz and Copper were written and planned to be released in a trilogy alongside Obsidian. Blue Stahli founder Bret Autrey's inspiration for the albums came from caring for his terminally ill mother who died in 2018 from brain cancer. In her memory, Autrey used her piano to record many of the songs. Autrey has considered Quartz to be "just awash of '90s craziness". For the other two albums, "Copper achieves the melancholy, experimental soundscape, while Obsidian defines who he is after his mom's death."

Two singles from Obsidian were released to promote the album; "Catastrophe", released on January 13, 2021, two days before the album's release, and the title track, with a music video released on February 3, 2021.

== Track listing ==
All tracks are written by Bret Autrey.

Quartz track listing
No.	Title	Length
1.	"Intro.S3m"	1:06
2.	"Crimewave"	2:42
3.	"Eat the Light"	4:48
4.	"Anchor"	4:15
5.	"Command Line Kill"	2:26
6.	"Dead Channel"	3:31
7.	"Summoning the End"	3:27
8.	"Devoured by Design"	3:00
9.	"Power Outage"	2:36
10.	"Assassin"	4:09
Total length:		32:00

Copper track listing
No.	Title	Length
1.	"The Road Forward"	3:15
2.	"Cello"	2:42
3.	"Resonance"	4:23
4.	"Dryheat"	2:37
5.	"With Night"	1:26
6.	"Fighter"	2:31
7.	"No Escape"	2:34
8.	"Death Will Have to Run"	2:43
9.	"All in Memory"	3:12
10.	"Copper Sands"	2:00
Total length:		27:23

Obsidian track listing
No.	Title	Length
1.	"Obsidian"	3:24
2.	"Prognosis"	3:55
3.	"Gravity"	4:41
4.	"The Mountain"	4:51
5.	"Nothing Ever Stays"	4:02
6.	"Legion"	3:05
7.	"One Last Breath"	3:28
8.	"Catastrophe"	5:04
9.	"Endure"	2:36
10.	"Daylight"	3:00
Total length:		38:06
