= Antisleep Vol. 01 =

Studio album by Blue Stahli
- Released: December 20, 2008
- Genre: Electro-industrial, electronic rock, alternative metal, big beat
- Length: 42:10
- Label: FiXT; Position
- Producer: Klayton

Blue Stahli chronology
| Antisleep Vol. 01 (2008) | Blue Stahli (2011) |

Professional ratings
Review scores
| Source | Rating |
|---|---|
| Sputnikmusic | 4/5 stars |
| Melodic | 2.5/5 stars |

Antisleep Vol. 01 is the debut studio album by American multi-genre project Blue Stahli, released in 2008. The majority of the tracks are instrumental. The album was produced by Klayton of Celldweller and it was mixed by Klayton and Bret. The cover artwork was made by Shawn Landis of Virocity.

== Track listing ==
All tracks are written by Bret Autrey

| No. | Title | Length |
|---|---|---|
| 1. | "Overklock" | 2:14 |
| 2. | "88 Rounds Per Minute" | 2:41 |
| 3. | "Shotgun Senorita" | 2:43 |
| 4. | "Regret" | 2:14 |
| 5. | "Accelerant" | 2:10 |
| 6. | "High Heeled Low Life" | 2:48 |
| 7. | "Doublequick" | 2:02 |
| 8. | "High Roller Mojo" | 2:16 |
| 9. | "Mystique" | 2:06 |
| 10. | "Premeditated" | 2:25 |
| 11. | "The Ultimate" | 2:33 |
| 12. | "Hit Me" | 2:19 |
| 13. | "Shiny" | 2:00 |
| 14. | "East" | 2:18 |
| 15. | "Disco Punks on Jolt" | 2:35 |
| 16. | "Leadfoot Getaway" | 2:20 |
| 17. | "Bulletproof" | 2:12 |
| 18. | "The Perfect Heist" | 2:14 |
