= Keith Ferrell =

American novelist

Henry Keith Ferrell
- Born: July 7, 1953
- Died: April 11, 2020 (aged 66)
- Occupation: Author
- Writing career
- Pen name: Keith Ferrell
- Genres: Science fiction, fantasy, biographical, science and video game guides
- Website: www.keithferrell.com

Henry Keith Ferrell (July 7, 1953 – April 11, 2020) was an American author with over a dozen published works including science fiction/fantasy, biographical and video game guides. Ferrell also edited the popular Omni magazine in the 1990s.

== Omni ==
Omni was a highly celebrated science/science fiction magazine. Ferrell was its editor from 1990 to 1996.

== Bibliography ==
=== Books ===
- H.G. Wells: First Citizen of the Future (1983)
- Ernest Hemingway: The Search for Courage (1984)
- George Orwell (1985)
- John Steinbeck: The Voice of the Land (1986)
- The Official Guide to Sid Meier's Civilization (1992)
- Passing Judgment (1996)
- Black Mist: And Other Japanese Futures with Orson Scott Card (1997)
- Tougher Times: A Practical Guide For Getting Through Them (2009)
- The Bane of Yoto - Bloodmoon: Birth of the Beast with Josh Viola (2012)
