= Josh Viola =

American author (born 1983)

Joshua Viola
- Born: July 23, 1983 (age 43)
- Occupations: Writer, Artist, Producer
- Writing career
- Pen name: J.V. Kyle, Jay Vee and Trevor Jones
- Genres: Science fiction, horror and fantasy
- Notable work: Legacy of Kain: Soul Reaver – The Dead Shall Rise
- Website: www.joshuaviola.com

Joshua "Josh" Viola (born July 23, 1983) is a science fiction/fantasy/horror writer and producer best known for Legacy of Kain: Soul Reaver – The Dead Shall Rise and his companies Hex Publishers and Bit Bot Media.

== Background ==
Viola is co-founder and co-owner of Frontière Natural Meats, a meat processing business co-founded and co-owned by his father and brother.

Viola co-wrote novels The Bane of Yoto with Nicholas Karpuk and Blackstar with Keith Ferrell, both published by Klayton of Celldweller's media imprint, FiXT. He directed the animated music video for Klayton's "Unshakeable".

Viola co-founded the Hex Publishers imprint with Dean Wyant in 2014. He published anthologies Nightmares Unhinged and Cyber World (co-edited with Jason Heller), and the slasher comic book series True Believers, co-written with Stephen Graham Jones. He and co-editors Carina Bisset and Hillary Dodge shared a 2022 Colorado Book Award for the Shadow Atlas: Dark Landscapes of the Americas anthology. In 2021, Hex partnered with StokerCon to produce the souvenir anthology for the Horror Writers Association's first online convention, with Viola acting as editor. In 2022, Hex partnered with startup Random Games to launch the blockchain-based Unioverse videogame franchise, with Viola in the role of Creative Director of Novelization and Comics. Random Games closed in 2026, citing funding struggles before Bit Bot acquired the rights to the IP. Viola was also credited as an executive producer on a 2025 reboot of sword and sorcery film Deathstalker, and horror film Shelby Oaks.

In 2024, Viola and Klayton co-founded multimedia company Bit Bot Media, and released an official video game adaptation of The Rocky Horror Show. The same year, they partnered with video game developer Crystal Dynamics to produce Legacy of Kain: Soul Reaver – The Dead Shall Rise, a graphic novel based on the Legacy of Kain series, which received $1.5 million via a Kickstarter campaign. Viola co-wrote The Dead Shall Rise with Angie Hodapp, and acted as creative director, producer and lead game designer on its video game adaptation, Legacy of Kain: Ascendance, which received mixed critic reviews. In 2026, IGN announced Thief: Pulse of Promise, a new graphic novel spinoff in the popular stealth video game series.

== Published works ==
=== As writer ===
==== Novels ====
- The Bane of Yoto with Nicholas Karpuk (FiXT, 2012)
- Blackstar with Keith Ferrell (FiXT, 2015)
- Denver Moon: The Minds of Mars (novella) with Warren Hammond (Hex Publishers, 2018)
- Denver Moon: The Saint of Mars (novella) with Warren Hammond (Hex Publishers, 2019)
- Denver Moon: The Thirteen of Mars (novella) with Warren Hammond (Hex Publishers, 2022)
- Stolen Pallor (novella) with Sean Eads (Blood Bound Books, 2024)

==== Comic books ====
- Tooth and Claw with Angie Hodapp and Aaron Lovett (Hex Publishers, 2017)
- Denver Moon with Warren Hammond and Aaron Lovett (Hex Publishers, 2018)
- Unioverse with Angie Hodapp and Ben Matsuya (Hex Publishers/Random Games, 2023)
- True Believers with Stephen Graham Jones and Ben Matsuya (Hex Publishers/Metal X Entertainment, 2023)
- Shrapnel Volume One ("Game Over") with James Aquilone and Juan Samu (Metal X Entertainment, 2024)
- Terror in the Corn: The Wells Twins with Sean Eads and Juan Samu (Metal X Entertainment/Anderson Farms, 2024)
- Terror in the Corn: Dumitra with Sean Eads (Metal X Entertainment/Anderson Farms, 2025)
- Legacy of Kain: Soul Reaver – The Dead Shall Rise with Angie Hodapp and Juan Samu (Bit Bot Media/Crystal Dynamics, 2024)
- Legacy of Kain: Soul Reaver – Fallen Brothers with Preston Asevedo (Limited Run Games/Bit Bot Media/Crystal Dynamics, 2024)
- Thief: Pulse of Promise with Sean Eads and Emanuele Ercolani (Bit Bot Media/Eidos-Montréal, 2026)

==== Children's books ====
- Boomer and Friends! with Lindsey Bell and Aaron Lovett (JAM Publishers, 2017)

==== Collections ====
- Midnight Vintage with Sean Eads (Crystal Lake Entertainment, 2025)

==== Video games ====
- Legacy of Kain: Ascendance (Creative Director, Producer, Lead Game Design, Assistant Voice Director, Art Director, Story, Writing & Dialogue, Special Creative Contributor)

=== As editor ===
- Nightmares Unhinged (Hex Publishers, 2015)
- Cyber World with Jason Heller (Hex Publishers, 2016)
- Georgetown Haunts and Mysteries with Jeanne Stein (Hex Publishers & Ghost Town Writers Retreat, 2017)
- Blood Business: Crime Stories from this World and Beyond with Mario Acevedo (Hex Publishers, 2017)
- Psi-Wars: Classified Cases of Psychic Phenomena (Hex Publishers, 2020)
- It Came From The Multiplex: 80s Midnight Chillers (Hex Publishers & Colorado Festival of Horror, 2020)
- StokerCon™ 2021 Souvenir Anthology: The Phantom Denver Edition (Hex Publishers/Horror Writers Association, 2021)
- Shadow Atlas: Dark Landscapes of the Americas with Carina Bissett and Hillary Dodge (Hex Publishers, 2021)
- Unioverse: Stories of the Reconvergence with Angie Hodapp (Hex Publishers/Random Games, 2023)

=== As producer ===
==== Films ====
- Deathstalker (film) 2024 (Executive Producer)
- Deathgasm II: Goremageddon (Executive Producer)
- Shrine of Abominations (Executive Producer)
- Aliens Expanded (Associate Producer)
- The Thing Expanded (Associate Producer)
- Shelby Oaks (Associate Producer)
- TerrorBytes (Associate Producer)

==== Video games ====
- The Rocky Horror Show Video Game 2024 (Executive Producer)
- Terror in the Corn (Executive Producer)
