= Mario Acevedo (author) =

American novelist and artist

- Born: July 6, 1955 (age 71); El Paso, Texas, U.S.
- Occupations: Novelist; artist
- Writing career
- Genre: Urban fantasy
- Website: www.marioacevedo.com

Mario Acevedo (born July 6, 1955) is an American novelist and artist, known for his series of urban fantasy novels featuring the vampire private investigator Felix Gomez. He lives and works in Denver, Colorado. Acevedo was born in El Paso, Texas. Before becoming a published writer, Acevedo held jobs as a military helicopter pilot, paratrooper, infantry officer, engineer, art teacher, software programmer, and assorted others. He was also deployed as a soldier and artist for the U.S. Army during Operation Desert Storm.

== Bibliography ==
=== Felix Gomez series ===
- The Nymphos of Rocky Flats (2006)
- X-Rated Bloodsuckers (2007)
- The Undead Kama Sutra (2008)
- Jailbait Zombie (2009)
- Werewolf Smackdown (2010)
- Rescue From Planet Pleasure (2015)
- Steampunk Banditos: Sex Slaves of Shark Island (2018)

=== Other works ===
- Killing the Cobra (2010) (co-written with Alberto Dose)
- Good Money Gone (2013) (co-written with R.W. Kilborn)
- University of Doom (2016)
- Forgotten Letters (2016) (co-written with Kirk Raeber)
- "Flawless" (short story), published in A Fistful of Dinosaurs (2018)
