= Blue Stahli =

American electronic music project

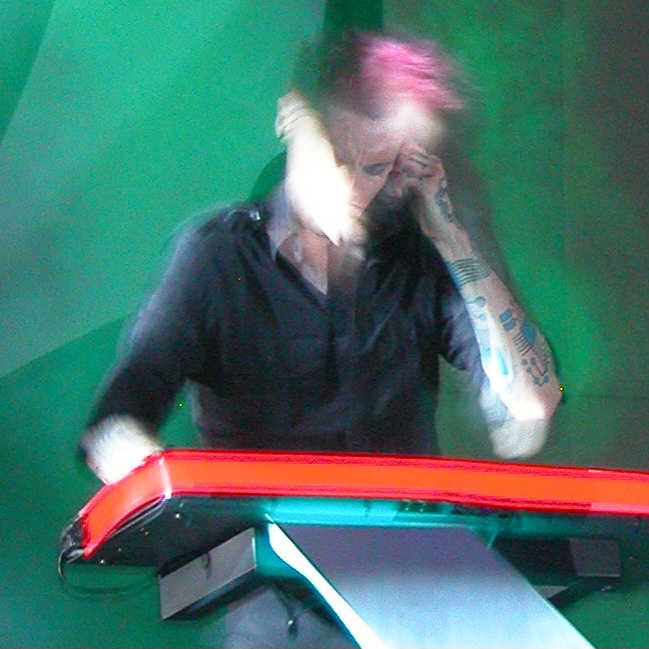
- Autrey performing at a Celldweller show in 2010

Background information
- Also known as: The Insignificant Others Lucid Hardware (1997) VOXiS:MACHINA (1997–2000); VOXiS (2000–2006); The Gimp Smackin' Love Truckers (2000–2004); Remorse Code (2006–2007); Sunset Neon (2017–present)
- Origin: Phoenix, Arizona, U.S.
- Genres: Industrial rock; industrial metal; alternative metal; electro-industrial; electronic rock
- Years active: 2007–present
- Labels: Ballistic Test; Flaming Fish; Position; FiXT
- Members: Bret Autrey
- Website: bluestahlimusic.com

Blue Stahli is an American electronic rock music project by Bret Autrey. Blue Stahli has released nine studio albums (four of which are instrumental) and his music has appeared in a number of movie trailers, shows and games. Additionally, he composes music for video games.

== History ==
=== Precursors and VOXiS (1997–2006) ===
Autrey started music at a young age, learning through the use of an old beat up piano he had rescued from a dump. He worked through 3 years of piano lessons, by mimicking his neighbor and playing the melodies by ear. During this same time, he had become interested in sampling and programming music using Impulse Tracker for MS-DOS. Later he received lessons from a friend for guitar, and would play along to music such as Queen's soundtrack to Flash Gordon. He has played in a band as the guitarist, fronted by drag queens; as well as joining a burlesque troupe as a DJ to their shows.

Self-taught in music, Autrey and Collin Landis entered a demo-tape titled Mainframe into Flaming Fish Music. Once on the label, the duo, aided by brother of Collin, Shawn Lanis (Virocity) produced (under VOXiS:MACHINA, and later VOXiS) Lullabies in 1998. Later in 2006, released as VOXiS, was the debut album Darkeworld: Project One. The release was aimed for summer 2001, but complications pushed the album back 5 years. Darkeworld features various collections of songs, demos, and experiments through the years 2000 to 2006, being re-released through FiXT in 2007.

=== Signing with FiXT Music and album releases (2007–2013) ===
Blue Stahli logo between 2011 and 2016

Klayton (of Celldweller; co-founder of the FiXT Music label) discovered Autrey in 2007 through a remix contest for "Own Little World", titled as the "Remorse Code remix". After he was signed, he formed a new project with the name Blue Stahli and relocated to Detroit, the residence of the FiXT Music label and its studios. The name originates as a mix between the painting "untitled blue" and its painter Susanne Stahli. The following year Blue Stahli debuted with his first single, "Kill Me Every Time" then later releasing his first instrumental based album Antisleep Vol. 01. Blue Stahli released additional singles which led up to the release of his first vocal album (with FiXT) Blue Stahli in 2011. He also released two more instrumental albums as sequels to Antisleep Vol. 01 in 2012 and 2013.

On May 20, 2013, Blue Stahli released a stand-alone single titled "Never Dance Again", which featured elements of 80s Dance music, followed by a remix by labelmate Josh Money. In July the same year, Stahli started a YouTube series titled Ask Blue Stahli, a vlogging series where fans can ask him questions on his social sites using the hashtag #askbluestahli for him to answer.

The first song ever officially recorded for Blue Stahli was This Will Make You Love Again, a cover of IAMX. Of the song, Autrey tells that it was recorded "in a closet in a family home." It was recorded the night before he left Phoenix, Arizona, to Detroit, Michigan, to begin the Blue Stahli project. Autrey also states that it was singing along to early IAMX records that taught him how to sing.

=== The Devil and Antisleep Vol. 4 (2013–2015) ===
In 2013, Blue Stahli premiered two new songs, titled "The Fall" and "Down In Flames", both of which were released on December 17, 2013, on the first "chapter" for the second upcoming vocal album, The Devil. This album had received wide coverage from popular online magazines such as Loudwire, Revolver and Bloody Disgusting. In an interview, Autrey stated that he aimed to finish and release the album in late 2014, however, this was later pushed back to 2015.

In May 2015, Autrey announced the completion of Antisleep Vol. 04 (Chapter 01), it was later released, without warning, on June 5, 2015.

The Devil was released on October 2, 2015.

=== Sunset Neon and Obsidian (2017–2020) ===
Since April 2017, Blue Stahli has been working under the alias Sunset Neon, a predominantly synthwave solo project. He released his debut album Starlight on December 1, 2017. On September 13, 2018, the single "Lakes of Flame" was released for the would-be seventh album, Obsidian. Obsidian was originally slated for a 2019 release with "Lakes of Flame" as the lead single, but Autrey's departure from FiXT Music delayed these plans to 2021, with "Lakes of Flame" becoming a non-album single.

=== The deadchannel_Trilogy (2020–present) ===
By the end of September, Blue Stahli posted three teasers for a trilogy of albums called the Dead Channel Trilogy (stylized as deadchannel_Trilogy). The first two were revealed to be titled Quartz and Copper while also confirming Obsidian to be the final album of the trilogy. The albums were released on October 2, November 13, 2020, and January 15, 2021, respectively; the first independent releases in Blue Stahli's history. In 2026 Blue Stahli revealed he's working on a new vocal album.

== Discography ==
Studio albums

- Antisleep Vol. 01 (2008)
- Blue Stahli (2011)
- Antisleep Vol. 02 (2011)
- Antisleep Vol. 03 (2012)
- The Devil (2015)
- Antisleep Vol. 04 (2017)
- The Dead Channel Trilogy
  - Quartz (2020)
  - Copper (2020)
  - Obsidian (2021)
