= Electronic rock =

Music genre

- Other names: Synth rock; electro rock
- Stylistic origins: Rock; electronic; musique concrète; tape music; avant-garde; pop; art rock
- Cultural origins: Late 1960s
- Typical instruments: Synthesizer; electric guitar; bass guitar; mellotron; electronic percussion; drums

Subgenres
- Indietronica; alternative dance; dance-punk; electroclash; grebo; industrial rock; krautrock; madchester; new rave; Nintendocore; electropunk

Other topics
- Electronics in rock music; synth-pop; new wave; post-punk; progressive rock; experimental rock

Electronic rock (also known as synth rock and electro rock) is a music genre that involves a combination of rock music and electronic music, featuring instruments typically found within both genres. It originates from the late 1960s when rock bands began incorporating electronic instrumentation into their music. Electronic rock acts usually fuse elements from other music styles, including punk rock, industrial rock, hip hop, techno and synth-pop, which has helped spur subgenres such as indietronica, dance-punk and electroclash.

== Overview ==
Being a fusion of rock and electronic, electronic rock features instruments found in both genres, such as synthesizers, mellotrons, tape music techniques, electric guitars and drums. Some electronic rock artists, however, often eschew guitar in favor of using technology to emulate a rock sound. Vocals are typically mellow or upbeat, but instrumentals are also common in the genre.

According to critic Simon Reynolds, examples included the United States of America, White Noise and Gong. A trend of rock bands that incorporated electronic sounds began during 1960s. Trevor Pinch and Frank Trocco, authors of the 2004 book Analog Days, credit the Beach Boys' 1966 hit "Good Vibrations" with having "popularly connected far-out, electronic sounds with rock 'n' roll." Other early acts to blend synthesizers and musique concrète's tape music techniques with rock instrumentation included Silver Apples, Fifty Foot Hose, Syrinx, Lothar and the Hand People, Beaver & Krause and Tonto's Expanding Head Band. Many such 1960s acts blended psychedelic rock with avant-garde academic or underground influences.

In the 1970s, German krautrock bands such as Neu!, Kraftwerk, Harmonia and Ash Ra Tempel challenged rock boundaries by incorporating electronic instrumentation. In 2004, Uncut described Kraftwerk's "incalculable" impact on electronic rock as being felt on major records like David Bowie's Low (1977) and Radiohead's Kid A (2000). Since the late 2000s, electronic rock has become increasingly popular.

== Subgenres and other terms ==
The term "progressive rock" (or "prog rock") was originally coined in the 1960s for music that would otherwise be described as "electronic rock," but the definition of "prog" later narrowed into a specific set of musical conventions as opposed to a sensibility involving forward-thinking or experimental approaches.

Electronic rock is also associated with industrial rock, synth-pop, dance-punk, indietronica, and new wave, with electroclash, new rave, post-punk revival, post-rock, considered as subgenres. Sometimes, certain other electronic subgenres are fused with rock, such as trance and techno, leading to the use of the terms trance rock and techno rock, respectively.

=== Synth-punk ===
Synth-punk
- Other names: Techno-punk; electropunk
- Stylistic origins: Punk rock; electronic
- Cultural origins: Late 1970s
- Typical instruments: Synthesizer; electric guitar; bass guitar; mellotron; electronic percussion; drums

Subgenres
- Digital hardcore; electronic body music

Other topics
- Industrial rock; post-punk; dance-punk; digital hardcore; electroclash; egg punk

Synth-punk (originally techno-punk or electropunk) is a style of electronic music that mixes the aggression of punk rock with the use of synthesizers. Originally pioneered by New York band Suicide, formed in 1970. Their sound over their five studio albums mixed punk rock with various electronic-based genres such as electronic rock, synth-pop, and disco. Other artists such as Californian band the Screamers were labeled "techno-punk" by the Los Angeles Times in 1978. Rather than the usual electric guitars, the band's instrumentation included a heavily distorted Fender Rhodes electric piano and an ARP Odyssey synthesizer.

The term synth-punk was coined in 1999 by Damien Ramsey on his "Synthysteria!" website, which covered the bands Screamers, Tone Set, Units, Voice Farm, Nervous Gender, and Our Daughter's Wedding.

In the early 1980s, synth-punk fused with various electronic genres to create electronic body music, which would influence a number of subsequent industrial dance, industrial rock and industrial metal acts. It also influenced the hardcore punk inspired digital hardcore, which combines hardcore punk with electronic music, noise and heavy metal. It typically features fast tempos and aggressive sound samples.

Later revival instances include electronic body music, dance punk, and electroclash. In the 2010s, synth-punk influenced the development of an Internet microgenre known as egg punk which drew influence from the band Devo.

=== Hyper-rock ===
Hyper-rock
- Stylistic origins: Shoegaze; hyperpop; electronic
- Cultural origins: Late 2010s and early 2020s

Other topics
- Digicore

Hyper-rock is a fusion genre that fuses rock music and hyperpop. It is characterized by a guitar-centric foundation combined with processed vocals, glitchy textures, and experimental sound design, resulting in a sound that differs from folktronica, indietronica, or digital hardcore. The term hyper-rock was coined by Stereogum journalist James Rettig. He introduced the term in a "tongue-in-cheek parenthetical" while reviewing Feeble Little Horse's album, Girl with Fish.

Hyper-rock, as a distinct musical style, is considered to have emerged in the late 2010s and early 2020s, although its foundational elements and experimental precursors date back further. Early sonic experiments in the 2000s laid the groundwork for the genre. Known forerunners include Sweet Trip's Velocity : Design : Comfort (2003) is considered a significant record for the genre, blending IDM, glitch, and shoegaze. Tracks such as "Fruitcake and Cookies" and "To All the Dancers of the World, a Round Form of Fantasy" illustrate the progression from fragmented electronic textures to euphoric, guitar-driven soundscapes, elements later associated with hyper-rock.

Hyper-rock is primarily built around rock guitars, which may range from dense, reverb-soaked layers reminiscent of shoegaze to harsher, evolving riffs influenced by black metal. Vocals are often heavily processed, employing techniques such as pitch shifting and the use of Auto-Tune. The style also incorporates glitched-out production and electronic elements, including programmed drums, synth textures, and fragmented soundscapes. The genre reflects a fusion of influences from a wide array of musical styles. Shoegaze contributes atmospheric textures and layered guitar sounds, while hyperpop informs its high-energy, glitch-oriented approach and vocal processing. IDM, glitch, and digicore provide jittery electronic elements and fragmented sound design. Some artists integrate aspects of heavy metal, trance, EDM, vaporwave, and pop.

=== Synth-metal ===
Synth-metal
- Stylistic origins: Heavy metal; electronic
- Cultural origins: Early 1980s
- Typical instruments: Synthesizer; electric guitar; bass guitar; mellotron; electronic percussion; drums

Other topics
- Industrial metal; cyber metal; electronicore; coldwave; electrogrind; dungeon synth; Nintendocore

Synth-metal is the fusion of heavy metal and electronic music. It was pioneered in the 1980s with Iron Maiden's album Somewhere in Time and Judas Priest's album Turbo, both of which notably incorporate guitar synthesizers. They were both released in 1986.

Besides synth-metal, electronicore, electrogrind, coldwave and dungeon synth, heavy metal is also sometimes mixed with other electronic genres and their subgenres, inspiring terms such as electronic metal, electronic dance metal, trance metal, techno metal, and cyber metal.

== See also ==
- Alternative dance
- Dance-rock
- Electronics in rock music
- Electropop
- List of electronic rock artists
