= Culture (disambiguation) =

Culture is both the conventional conduct and ideologies of a given community.

Culture may also refer to:

== Science ==
- Cell culture
- Tissue culture
- Microbiological culture
- Microbial food cultures
- Animal culture, socially-transmitted and learned traditions in animals

=== Social sciences ===
- Organizational culture, also known as corporate culture, in management
- Material culture, the artificial objects that characterize a human society
- Archaeological culture, a recurring combination of artifacts and construction that indicate a past society

== Entertainment and fiction ==
=== Literature ===
- Culture Magazine, an American cannabis culture magazine
- Culture series, a science fiction series written by Scottish author Iain M. Banks
  - The Culture, an advanced civilization in the Banks novels
- Cultured (magazine), an art, design and architecture magazine

=== Music ===
- Culture (band), a Jamaican reggae group
- Culture (American band), an American metalcore band
- Culture (musician), a Canadian rapper
- Culture Press, a UK record label
- Culture (album), a 2017 album by Migos

=== Other ===
- "Culture" (Bottom), an episode of the British sitcom Bottom
- Kultur (film), a 1918 American silent film directed by Edward J. Le Sainte
- The Culture, a podcast by Schwartz Media

== Media ==
- Cultural Channel (Armenia)
- Deutschlandfunk Kultur, a German radio station
- France Culture, a French radio station
- The Foundation of Broadcast Culture, a South Korean organization
- Radio Culture, a Ukrainian radio station
- TVR Cultural, a Romanian television channel
- ZDFkultur, a defunct German television channel

== Other ==
- IETF language tags, used in computer internationalization and localization to identify a "culture" - the combination of language and peculiarities of geographical location in computing (like en-UK, en-US, de-AT, de-DE, fr-BE)
- Cultures, Lozère, a commune in France

== See also ==
- Cross Culture (disambiguation)
- Counter Culture (disambiguation)
- Couture (disambiguation)
- Cult (disambiguation)
- Cultivation
