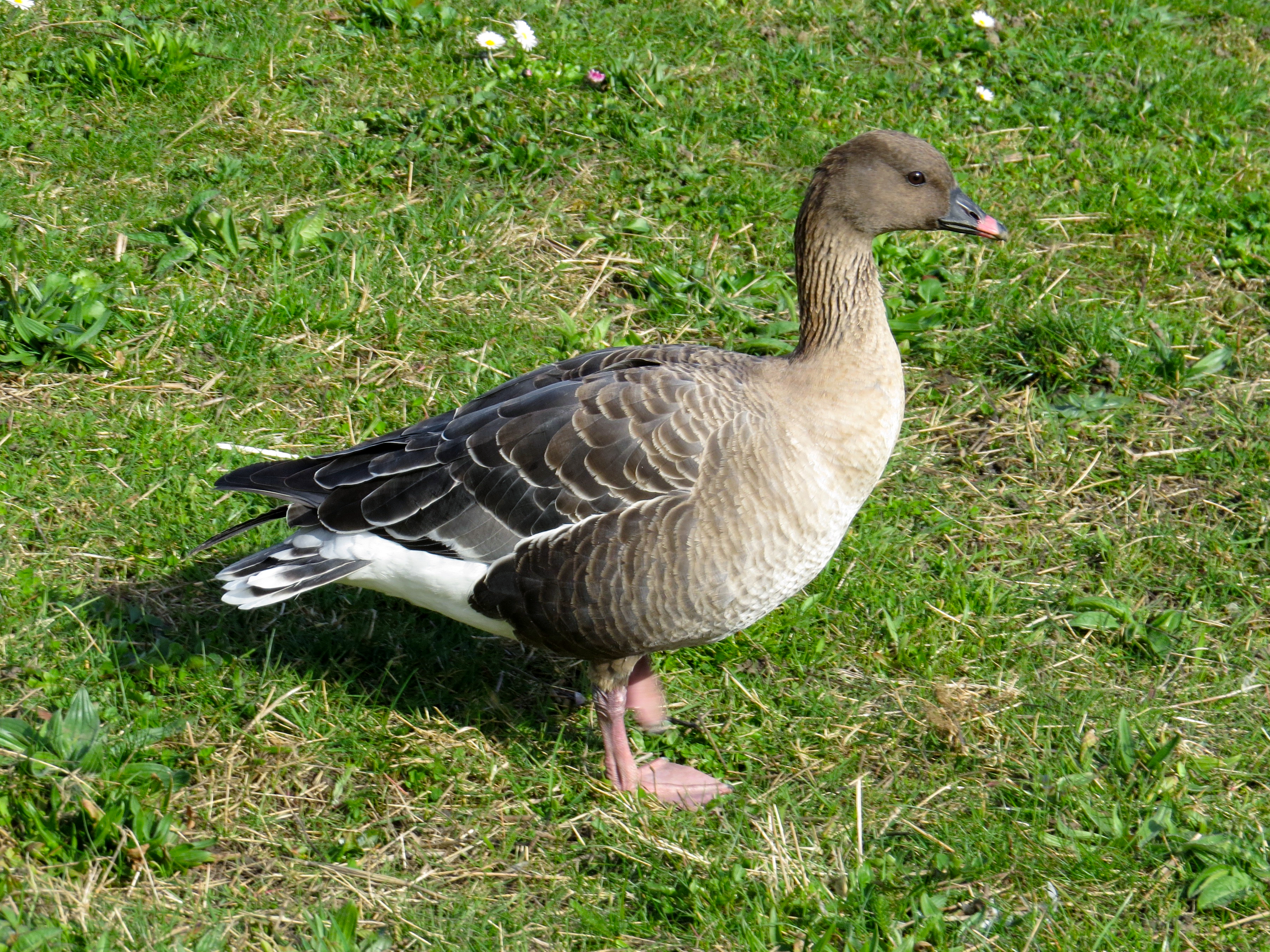

Conservation status
- Least Concern (IUCN 3.1)

Scientific classification
- Kingdom: Animalia
- Phylum: Chordata
- Class: Aves
- Order: Anseriformes
- Family: Anatidae
- Genus: Anser
- Species: A. brachyrhynchus

Binomial name
- Anser brachyrhynchus Baillon, 1834
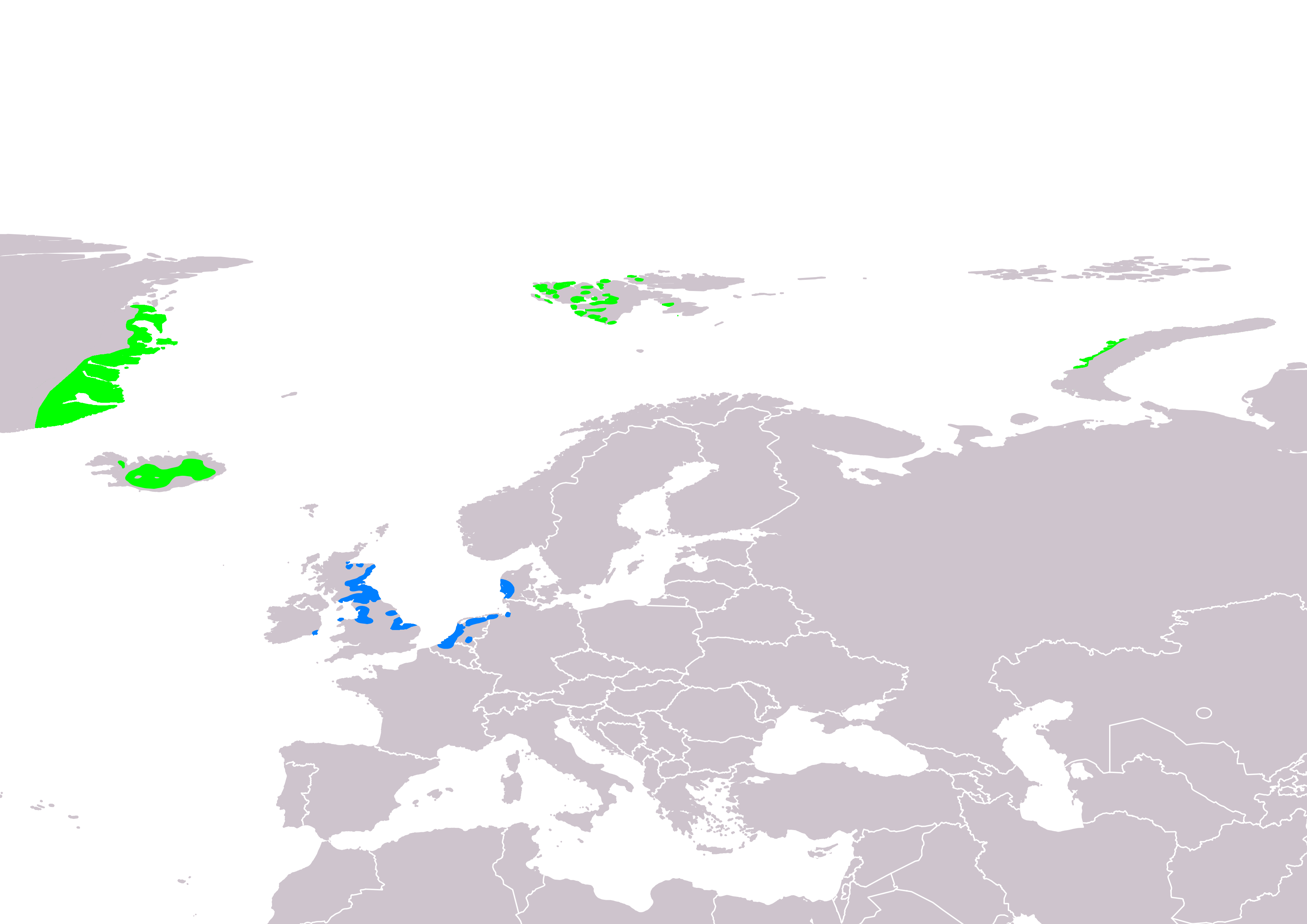
- Range of A. brachyrhynchus Summer Winter

Audio
- Calls of a flock recorded in Scotland

= Pink-footed goose =

Species of bird

The pink-footed goose (Anser brachyrhynchus) is a goose which breeds in eastern Greenland, Iceland, Svalbard, and recently Novaya Zemlya. It is migratory, wintering in northwest Europe, especially Ireland, Great Britain, the Netherlands, and western Denmark. The name is often abbreviated in colloquial usage to "pinkfoot" (plural "pinkfeet"). Anser is the Latin for "goose", and brachyrhynchus comes from the ancient Greek brachus, meaning "short", and rhunchos, meaning "bill".

== Description ==
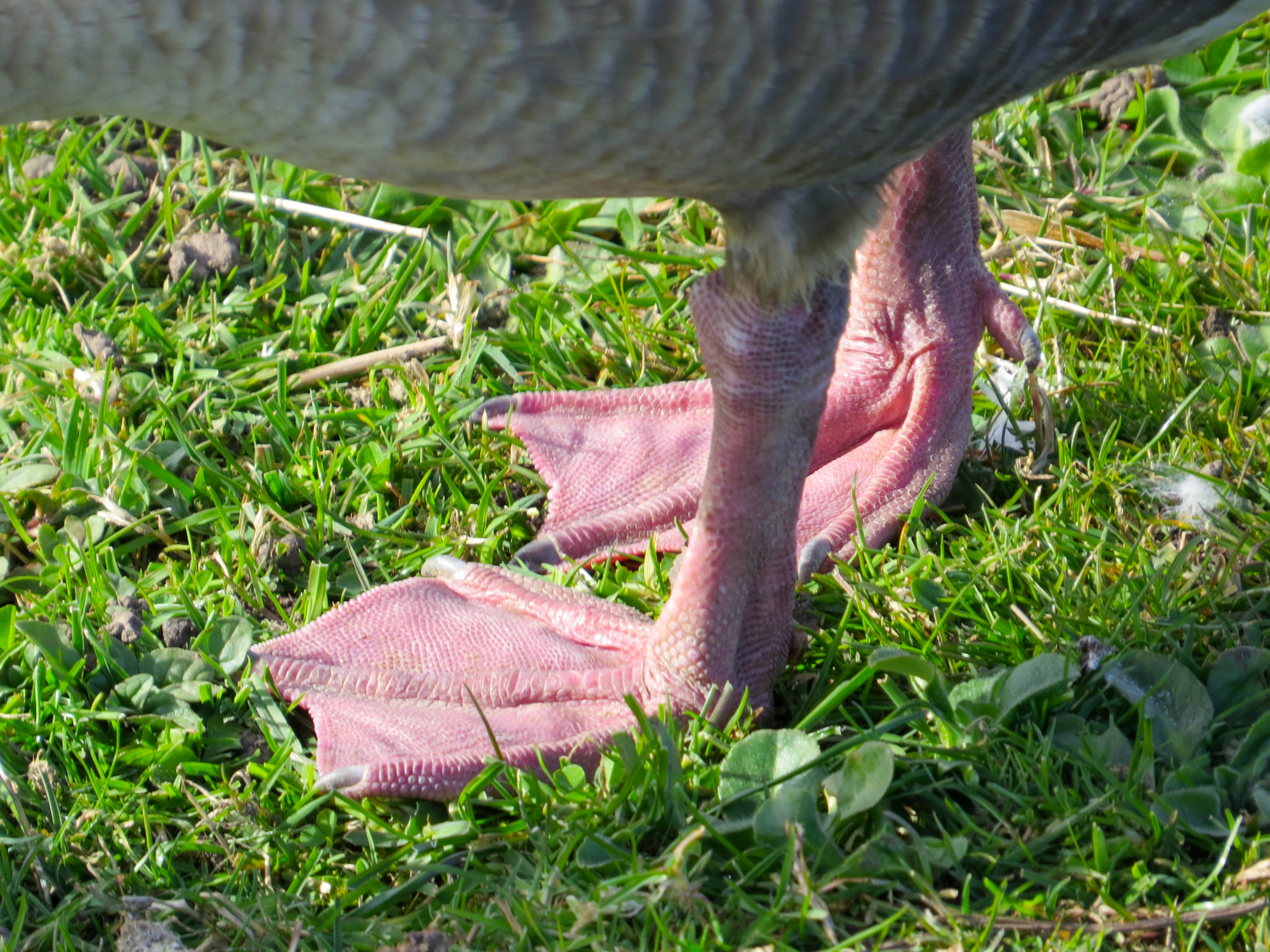
The pink feet which give it its name

It is a medium-sized goose, 60–75 cm (24–30 in) long, the wingspan 135–170 cm (53–67 in), and weighing 1.8–3.4 kg (4.0–7.5 lb). It has a short bill, bright pink in the middle with a black base and tip, similar in pattern to tundra bean goose but pink where that species is orange, and pink feet. The body is mid-grey-brown, the head and neck a richer, darker brown, the rump and vent white, and the tail grey with a broad white tip. The upper wing-coverts are of a somewhat similar pale bluish-grey as in the greylag goose, and the flight feathers blackish-grey.

== Taxonomy ==
The species is most closely related to the larger taiga bean goose Anser fabalis, rather than the similarly-sized subspecies of the tundra bean goose A. serrirostris rossicus, with which it had earlier been linked. It produces a medley of high-pitched honking calls, being particularly vocal in flight, with large skeins being almost deafening.

== Population ==
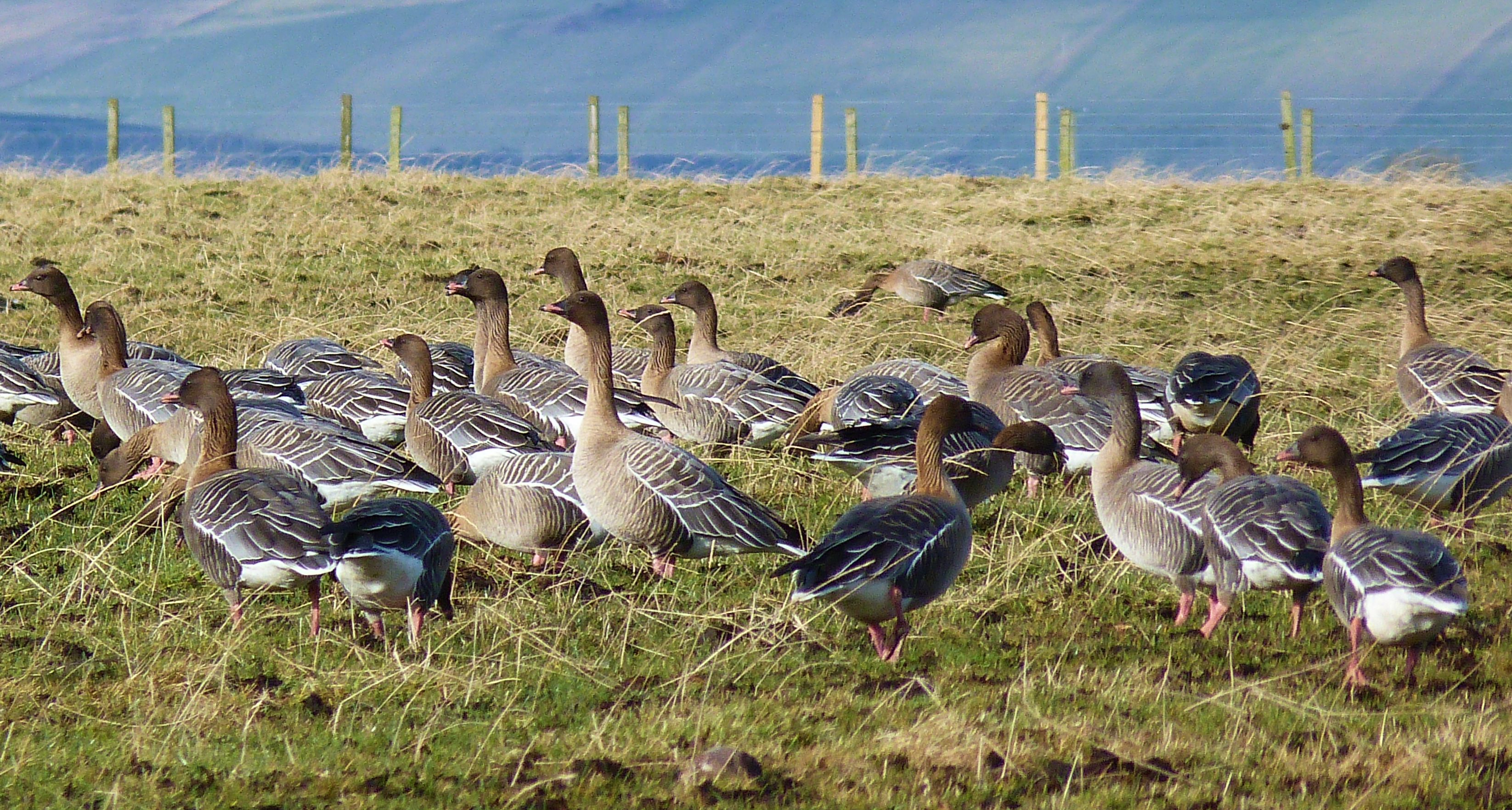
Part of a feeding flock in winter

There are two largely discrete populations of pink-footed goose. The Greenland and Iceland population winters in Great Britain, while the Svalbard and Novaya Zemlya population winters in the Netherlands and Denmark, with small numbers also in Norway (where it is common on migration), northern Germany, and Belgium.

Populations have risen spectacularly over the last 50 years, due largely to increased protection from shooting on the wintering grounds. Numbers wintering in Ireland and Great Britain have risen almost tenfold from 30,000 in 1950 to 292,000 in October 2004. The numbers wintering in Denmark and the Netherlands have also risen, with about 34,000 in 1993. The most important single breeding site, at Þjórsárver in Iceland (holding 10,700 pairs in 1970), was only discovered in 1951, by Sir Peter Scott and his team who made an expedition to seek the breeding grounds. Within Great Britain, the most important wintering areas are in Norfolk (147,000 in 2004), Lancashire (44,000 in 2004), and Aberdeenshire (primarily on autumn and spring passage). In Ireland it winters mainly in County Louth. Large to huge wintering flocks graze on farmland; individual flocks can be spectacular, such as the 66,000 at Loch of Strathbeg, Aberdeenshire in early September 2003.

A 2023 paper documented the rapid formation of a new breeding population of pink-footed geese on the Novaya Zemlya archipelago in Russia. This population was formed within 10 years by individuals from the Svalbard breeding population; the colonisation of this new habitat was thought to be facilitated by climate change (with warming causing Novaya Zemlya to gain a climate more akin to Svalbard's climate from decades prior) and the capacity for cultural transmission and social learning among the geese. This range expansion is thought to be one of the most dramatic climate change-induced distribution changes in a migratory bird. This population numbered about 3,000 to 4,000 birds as of 2023.

== Ecology ==
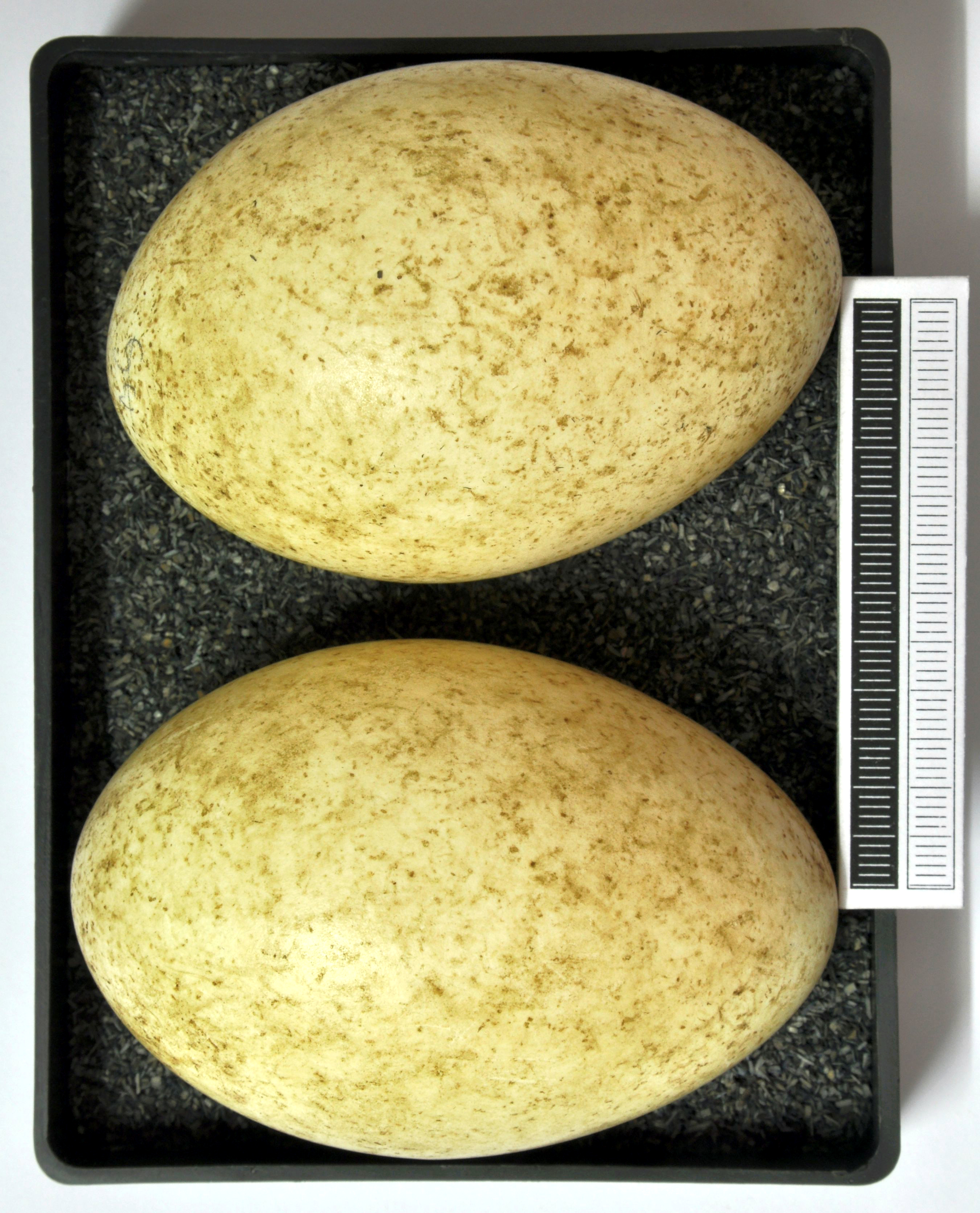
Eggs, Collection Museum Wiesbaden

Nesting is often on cliffs close to glaciers to provide protection from mammalian predators (mainly Arctic fox), also on islets in lakes.

Three to five eggs are laid, with incubation lasting 25–28 days. Eggs measure 7–9 cm (2.8–3.5 in) in length and 4.8–5.8 cm (1.9–2.3 in) in width.

On hatching, the goslings accompany the parents on foot to the nearest lake, where they fledge after about 56 days. Southbound migration is from mid-September to early October, and northbound from mid-April to early May.

The diet is almost entirely herbivorous. In summer, they feed on a wide range of tundra plants, both on land and in water. In winter, they graze primarily on oilseed rape, sugar beet, potato, and various grasses; damage to crops can be extensive, though their grazing can also benefit particularly sugar beet and potato farmers by gleaning leaves and roots left behind after the crop is harvested, reducing the transmission of crop diseases from one year to the next.

== Vagrancy ==
Despite the proximity to the large winter numbers in Great Britain, only very small numbers occur in Ireland and France. It is a rare vagrant to several other European countries and as far south as Morocco and the Canary Islands, and also to eastern Canada and the United States (from Newfoundland south to Pennsylvania). From November to December 2022, one was seen repeatedly in Kentucky, the first known instance of the bird being seen in the state.

The pink-footed goose is one of the species to which the Agreement on the Conservation of African-Eurasian Migratory Waterbirds (AEWA) applies.
