= Grass-in-ear behavior =

Behavior that chimpanzees do

The grass-in-ear behavior, object-in-ear behavior or grass-in-the-ear technique is a fashion statement-like behavior that some chimpanzees do. The unusual behavior has been named by scientists, and it appears to be one of the first times that chimpanzees have created a tradition that has no discernible purpose.

== History ==
It was first documented in 2010 in the Zambian Chimfunshi Wildlife Orphanage sanctuary's grassy territory when a chimpanzee named Julie stuck a piece of grass into her ear, and left it there. But after Julie did it, other chimpanzees in her group began to follow suit, beginning with her son. The behavior continued to spread even after Julie died, which shows that the behaviour was established as a form of social learning in animals, an important component of animal culture.
