= Fool's Paradise =

Fool's Paradise may refer to:

== Films ==
- Fool's Paradise (1921 film), a film by Cecil B DeMille
- Fool's Paradise, a 1997 film with Karen Duffy
- Fool's Paradise (2023 film), a film by Charlie Day

== Music ==
- Fool's Paradise (opera), a 1994 opera by Ofer Ben-Amots, based on a story by Isaac Bashevis Singer

=== Albums ===
- Fool's Paradise (Monday Morning album), 2005
- Fool's Paradise (The Head Cat album), 2006
- Fool's Paradise (Cold Specks album), a 2017 album by the band Cold Specks
- A Fool's Paradise, a 1973 album by the American band Lazarus

=== Songs ===
- "Fool's Paradise", a 1955 song first recorded by Johnny Fuller and covered by:
  - Charles Brown (musician), 1955
  - Sam Cooke, on the 1963 album Night Beat
  - Mose Allison, on the 1965 album Mose Alive!
- "Fool's Paradise", a 1956 song by Eddie Cochran and Hank Cochran with Jerry Capehart
- "Fool's Paradise", a 1958 song recorded by Buddy Holly and The Crickets
  - Covered in 1973 by Don McLean
- "Fool's Paradise", a 1972 song by The Sylvers
- "Fool's Paradise", a 1975 song by Rufus Featuring Chaka Khan
- "Fool's Paradise", a 1985 song by Oingo Boingo on the album Dead Man's Party
- "Fool's Paradise", a 1986 song by Meli'sa Morgan
- "Fool's Paradise", a 1996 song by Welsh singer Donna Lewis
- "A Fool's Paradise", a song by Symphony X from the 2000 album V: The New Mythology Suite

== Other uses ==
- "Fool's Paradise", a short story by Isaac Bashevis Singer included in his collection Zlateh the Goat and Other Stories
- "Fool's Paradise (Evil Con Carne)", an episode of Evil Con Carne
- "Fool's Paradise", an episode of The Loud House
- "Viddikalude Swargam" (transl. "Fool's Paradise"), a Malayalam-language short story by Indian writer Vaikom Muhammad Bahseer

== See also ==
- Paradise of Fools
