= Couture =

Couture may refer to:

== Film ==
- Couture (film), a 2025 French and American drama film

== People ==
- Couture (surname)

== Places ==
=== Belgium ===
- Couture-Saint-Germain, a village in the municipality of Lasne, Belgium

=== Canada ===
- Couture crater and Lac Couture, an impact crater and the lake that covers it in Quebec, Canada

=== France ===
- Couture, Charente, in the Charente département, France
- Couture-d'Argenson, in the Deux-Sèvres département, France
- Couture-sur-Loir, in the Loir-et-Cher département, France
- La Couture (disambiguation), locations in France

=== United States ===
- The Couture, high-rise in Milwaukee, Wisconsin

== Fashion ==
- Haute couture, sometimes just called couture

== See also ==
- Couturier
- Culture (disambiguation)
