= The King in a Rookery =

Studio album by Pivitplex
- Released: November 14, 2006
- Genre: Christian rock, alternative rock
- Length: 53:17
- Label: Hawley, Selectric
- Producer: Jason Burkum

Pivitplex chronology
| The This is Then EP (2005) | The King in a Rookery (2006) |

Professional ratings
Review scores
| Source | Rating |
|---|---|
| Jesus Freak Hideout | 4/5 stars |

The King in a Rookery is the second album from Christian rock band Pivitplex.

== Track listing ==
1. End Of The Line
2. Hello Monday
3. One Goodbye
4. Its Our Time
5. The Deal
6. I'm Alive
7. Long Way Down
8. Everythings OK
9. Final Straw
10. Here and Now
11. Gravity
12. I Concede
