= Pivitplex =

- Origin: Nashville, Tennessee, United States
- Genres: Alternative rock Christian rock
- Years active: 1999–present
- Labels: BEC Recordings; Hawley Recording Company; Selectric Records; Sonicfish Records
- Members: Scott Brownson; Joby Rudolph; Phillip Hicks; Alex Hicks; Levi Stugelmeyer
- Past members: Josh Ogle; James Calk; Eddie Frank; Scott Wilber
- Website: Pivitplex on Myspace

Pivitplex is a five-piece alternative Christian rock band from Nashville, Tennessee. The band started in Montana, under the name Porchlight in 1998. Scott Brownson, lead singer and songwriter, combines guitar with mixed electronic sounds for a unique harmony.

== Discography ==
=== Albums ===
Year	Title	Label(s)
2001/2003	Under Museum Quality Glass	BEC Recordings, Sonicfish Records
2005	The This is Then EP	November Twelve
2006	The King in a Rookery	Selectric Records/Hawley Recording Company

=== Singles ===
Year	Title	Label(s)
2007	"The Dead Whisper On (Hope Killed the Shadows)" (Online/iTunes)	Hawley Recording Company
2007	"The Deal"	Hawley Recording Company
2006	"I'm Alive"	Hawley Recording Company
2005	"Rosetta Stone"	SonicFish Productions
2004	"Cash It In"	SonicFish Productions
2004	"Overshaken"	SonicFish Productions
2003	"You Know"	SonicFish Productions

== Videography ==
Year	Title	Label(s)
2005	This is Then DVD	BEC Recordings

== Filmography ==
- The Pivitplex Show (TV) - 2006 - Themselves

== Band members ==
=== Current ===
- Scott Brownson - lead vocals, rhythm guitar
- Joby Rudolph - lead guitar, vocals
- Alex Hicks - guitar, vocals
- Phillip Hicks - bass
- Levi Stugelmeyer - drums
- Ryan Penn - Vocals, Harmonica, spoons

=== Former members ===
- Josh Ogle - bass
- James Calk - Drums
- Eddie Frank - Lead Guitar
- Scott Wilber - Drums
