= La Couture =

La Couture may refer to the following communes in France:

- La Couture, Pas-de-Calais
- La Couture, Vendée
- La Couture-Boussey, in the Eure département

== See also ==
- Couture (disambiguation)
