= Cross Culture =

Cross Culture may refer to:

- Over Ashes, formerly Cross Culture, an American Christian rock band
- Cross Culture (album), an album by Joe Lovano
