= Under Museum Quality Glass =

Studio album by Pivitplex
- Released: November 4, 2003
- Recorded: ???
- Genre: Christian rock, alternative rock
- Length: 43:54
- Label: BEC, Hawley, Sonicfish

Pivitplex chronology
Under Museum Quality Glass (2003)	The This is Then EP (2005)

Professional ratings
Review scores
Source	Rating
Jesus Freak Hideout	3.5/5 stars

Under Museum Quality Glass is the first studio album from the band Pivitplex. Originally released by Hawley Recording Company and Sonicfish Records, it was picked up by BEC Recordings for re-release.

== Track listing ==
1. Some Will Fall Listen
2. Grounded
3. You Know
4. Cash it in
5. Over Shaken
6. Rosetta Stone
7. Feeling Fear
8. Nothing Without You
9. You and Me
10. Clarity
11. Lullaby
