= Fool's Paradise (Monday Morning album) =

Studio album by Monday Morning
- Released: August 30, 2005
- Genre: Alternative rock, pop rock
- Length: 56:26
- Label: Selectric
- Producer: Quinlan

Monday Morning chronology
Blind (2002)	Fool's Paradise (2005)

Singles from Fool's Paradise
- 1. "Wonder of It All (Next Year)" Released: 2006

Fool's Paradise is the first major studio album released by Christian alternative rock band Monday Morning. It was released on August 30, 2005 through Selectric Records. The album features their single "Wonder of It All (Next Year)", which was the 9th most played song on Christian contemporary hit radio in 2006.

== Music and lyrics ==
The band has labeled their major musical influences Silverchair, U2, Pearl Jam, Led Zeppelin, and Our Lady Peace. The song "Blind" is about addiction, while "Can't Go On" discusses the topic of racism.

== Release ==
Fool's Paradise was the band's major record label debut; it was released on August 30, 2005 through Selectric Records, which was the band's first album through the label. The album's lead single, "Wonder of It All (Next Year)" was played on Christian radio in 2006, and became the year's 9th most-played song on Christian contemporary hit radio.

=== Reception ===
Professional ratings
Review scores
Source	Rating
Christian Music Today	3/5 stars
Jesus Freak Hideout	4/5 stars
About.com	3/5 stars
Cross Rhythms	6/10 stars

Fool's Paradise received mixed reviews from music critics, although its reception was relatively positive. Brian Jones of About.com said that the album was overall "well done and heartfelt", adding, "At times they recycle the same hooks and it becomes a little redundant. I think these guys have way too much talent to have to recycle licks and become repetitive." The album's musical style has been compared to U2, specifically on the track "Wonder of It All (Next Year)". Christian Music Today editor Russ Breimeier concluded his review with, "there are some impressive flashes of rock intensity and melodic hooks on Fool's Paradise that are compromised by other more formulaic and predictable tracks." Cross Rhythms magazine was more negative towards it: "Unfortunately Monday Morning follow in the footsteps of bands like Radialangel and Stereo Motion in creating an album which fizzes loudly but never really explodes into anything memorable. Everything is in place as you'd expect ... none of the songs sound like anything you haven't heard already a hundred times." Jesus Freak Hideout's Lauren Summerford said that the band offered a "pleasant rock sound".

== Cover ==
In a 2006 interview with Jesus Freak Hideout, lead vocalist Derek Stipe said of the album artwork:

True art has its own meaning for each person who views it. It's very symbolic, and to me has a meaning very similar to the album title. Paradise lost, but we still can't get enough.

== Track listing ==
1. "Sunshine"
2. "Dear You"
3. "Can't Go On"
4. "These Eyes"
5. "Vanity"
6. "Wonder of It All (Next Year)"
7. "Until the End"
8. "Tonight"
9. "Blind"
10. "Desperate"
11. "Breakaway"
12. "Stand"
13. "Tear Me From You"
