= Couture (surname) =

Couture is a surname. Notable people with the surname include:

- Christa Couture, Canadian broadcaster, musician, and writer
- Dani Couture (born 1978), Canadian writer
- Doug Couture, American musician and member of Beatles tributes The Fab Four and 1964 the Tribute
- Gerry Couture (1925–1994), Canadian hockey player
- Guillaume Couture (1617/18–1701), lay missionary, diplomat and militia captain in New France
- Léonie Couture (born 1951), Canadian feminist and charity founder
- Logan Couture (born 1989), Canadian hockey player
- Maurice Couture (1926–2018), former Roman Catholic Archbishop of Québec
- Randy Couture (born 1963), retired American mixed martial arts fighter
- Rosario Couture (1905–1986), Canadian hockey player
- Ryan Couture (born 1982), American mixed martial arts fighter and son of Randy Couture
- Thomas Couture (1815–1879), French history painter
- Jean-Guy Couture (1929–2022), Canadian catholic priest

== See also ==
- Martin Couture-Rouleau (died 2014) aka Ahmad LeConverti, radicalized Canadian Islamist convert
