= Over Ashes =

- Also known as: Cross Culture
- Origin: Columbus, Ohio, United States
- Genres: Christian rock, pop rock
- Years active: 2007-2008
- Labels: TAG Artist Group, Selectric
- Past members: Justin David; Dan Harrasss; Denver Shindle; JD Anderson; Caleb Carpenter; Gardy Garcia
- Website: www.myspace.com/overashesmusic

Over Ashes was an American Christian rock band from Columbus, Ohio that later relocated to Nashville, Tennessee. The original group included founding members of Cross Culture, and appeared at the 2007 Gospel Music Week.

The name Over Ashes is a reference to Isaiah 61:3.

== History ==
Their début album Begin Again was said to be "full of straight rock tracks, with a few worship ballads thrown in for good measure". A review in The Christian Pulse said that "for all the wonderful things one could say about the music they produce, it is their attitude that truly shines".

Being the afterthought of Cross Culture (Selectric/Sony Red-2005), singer Justin David, and guitarist Dan Harrasss, along with newly added drummer Denver Shindle, began the studio works of "Begin Again", January 2007, with Production Duo Justin York (Tait, Steven Curtis Chapman) and Justin Glasco (Jeremy Camp, Kate Voegle, Carey Brothers, Mat Kearney). Dan Harrasss exited due to management difficulties, and the band was renamed as it was a new direction musically, and in lineup.

Upon completion of the record, the band hit the road in early 2007, across the eastern seaboard and midwest, with touring bass player Lee Klopfenstein. In April 2007 right before GMA week in Nashville, TN, the band acquired Gardy Garcia from Houston, TX. The band released its record nationwide July 2007, debuting No. 3 on the CHR sales charts immediately behind Barlow Girl. It has since gone on to sell more than 28,000 records according to Neilson soundscan.

Upon relocating from Columbus, OH to Nashville, TN in 2007, singer Justin David resigned from the group in October, although returning for an end of the year performance in Maryland. Through multiple personnel testing on guitar and vocals, JD Anderson joined as an additional guitarist briefly while Caleb Carpenter was brought in to replace Justin David.

The band continued to tour periodically through 2008, and opted to go their separate ways after differences with management. Current projects from the band members include Coincidence Maybe (Denver Shindle), Tigerparty (Gardy Garcia), and Brightwork (formerly Facing the Lion) (Caleb Carpenter). Justin David was formerly the modern (Emerge) worship director at Jersey Church in Columbus, Ohio. Justin finished a collaborative recording project with multiple writers released in 2011 through Jersey Baptist Church crossing various styles including Gospel Choir, Pop Rock, and traditional choir. Justin currently is a worship pastor at the Miami Springs Campus of Christ Fellowship Church in Miami, Florida, and director of worship internships and development of student worship leaders. He and his wife Kelli, and daughter Lola live in Southern Miami.

Justin along with Denver Shindle and various other creative artists are working on a new indy/art/theater project under the group name Waking Vegas. Pre-production has begun, with discussions of working with previous producer Justin York and up and coming producers Kevin Lankford on a separate two part release TBA.

== Discography ==
- Proof Positive (2006) Selectric Records/ Sony Red/ 3,1 productions, as Cross Culture
- Begin Again (2007) indie/Tag Distribution
