= Counter Culture =

Counter Culture may refer to:

- Counterculture, a subculture whose values and norms of behavior differ substantially from those of mainstream society
  - Counterculture of the 1960s, a specific instance of the above
- Counter Culture (album), a 2005 album by Roy Harper
- Counter Culture (EP), an EP by British India
- Counter Culture (TV pilot), an American comedy television pilot
