= Selectric Records =

Independent record label

- Defunct: 2006
- Status: Inactive
- Country of origin: United States
- Location: Franklin, Tennessee

Selectric Records was an independent record label based in Franklin, Tennessee. Their roster was made up of a number of rock bands, including Monday Morning, Cross Culture (now known as Over Ashes), Dalton, Pivitplex, Homeless J., and High Flight Society. Selectric Records was started by industry veterans John Elefante and Dino Elefante.

== Closing ==
In December 2006 Selectric Records officially closed their doors. Prior to Selectric Records closing, Cross Culture and Monday Morning had bought out of their recording contracts. While High Flight Society was signed by Rocketown Records and released their debut album in May 2007.

== See also ==
- List of record labels
