= Social learning in animals =

Observation or interaction with another animal

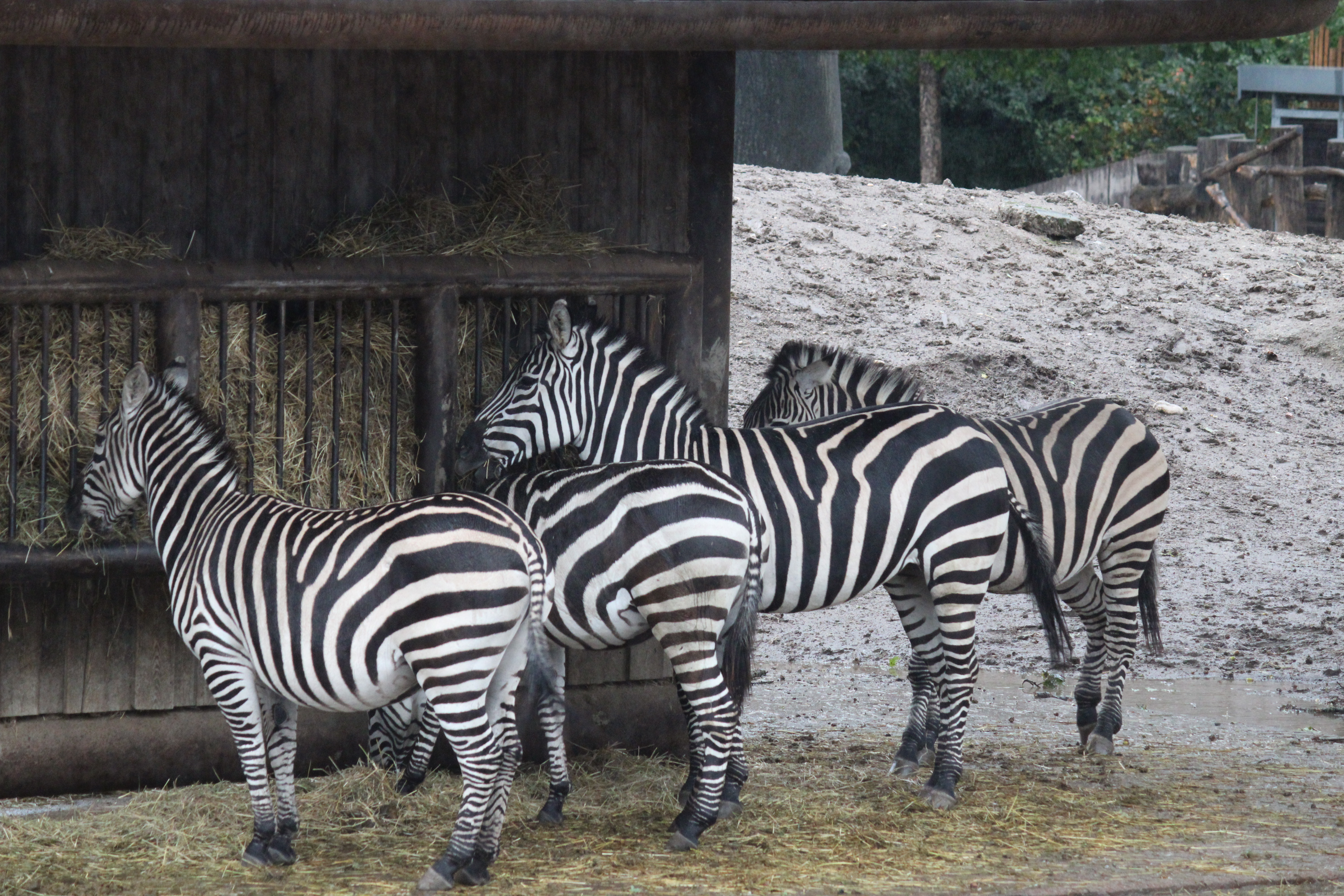
Zebras eating together at Copenhagen Zoo, Denmark

Social learning refers to learning that is facilitated by observation of, or interaction with, another animal or its products. Social learning has been observed in a variety of animal taxa, such as insects, fish, birds, reptiles, amphibians and mammals (including primates).

Social learning is fundamentally different from individual learning, or asocial learning, which involves learning the appropriate responses to an environment through experience and trial and error. Though asocial learning may result in the acquisition of reliable information, it is often costly for the individual to obtain. Therefore, individuals that are able to capitalize on other individuals' self-acquired information may experience a fitness benefit. However, because social learning relies on the actions of others rather than direct contact, it can be unreliable. This is especially true in variable environments, where appropriate behaviors may change frequently. Consequently, social learning is most beneficial in stable environments, in which predators, food, and other stimuli are not likely to change rapidly.

When social learning is actively facilitated by an experienced individual, it is classified as teaching. Mechanisms of inadvertent social learning relate primarily to psychological processes in the observer, whereas teaching processes relate specifically to activities of the demonstrator. Studying the mechanisms of information transmission allows researchers to better understand how animals make decisions by observing others' behaviors and obtaining information.

An alternative way to classify social learning is by the type of information acquired rather than by the underlying learning mechanism. This approach distinguishes, for example, learning about what to interact with (“know-what”), where to act (“know-where”), when to act (“know-when”), who to attend to (“know-who”), and how an action is performed (“know-how”). Such a classification has been proposed as a more systematic way to compare different forms of social learning.

== Social learning mechanisms ==
Social learning occurs when one individual influences the learning of another through various processes. In local enhancement and opportunity providing, the attention of an individual is drawn to a specific location or situation. In stimulus enhancement, emulation, observational conditioning, the observer learns the relationship between a stimulus and a result but does not directly copy the behavior of the experienced individual. In imitation, the observer directly copies the behavior of the animal in order to complete a novel task. In emulation, the observer learns a goal from the observed animal's behavior and seeks to achieve the same results while not following all of the same steps. All of these mechanisms are possible through inadvertent social learning, without active facilitation from the experienced individual. When an individual more actively influences another's behavior through any one of these mechanisms, the individual becomes a teacher.

=== Local enhancement ===
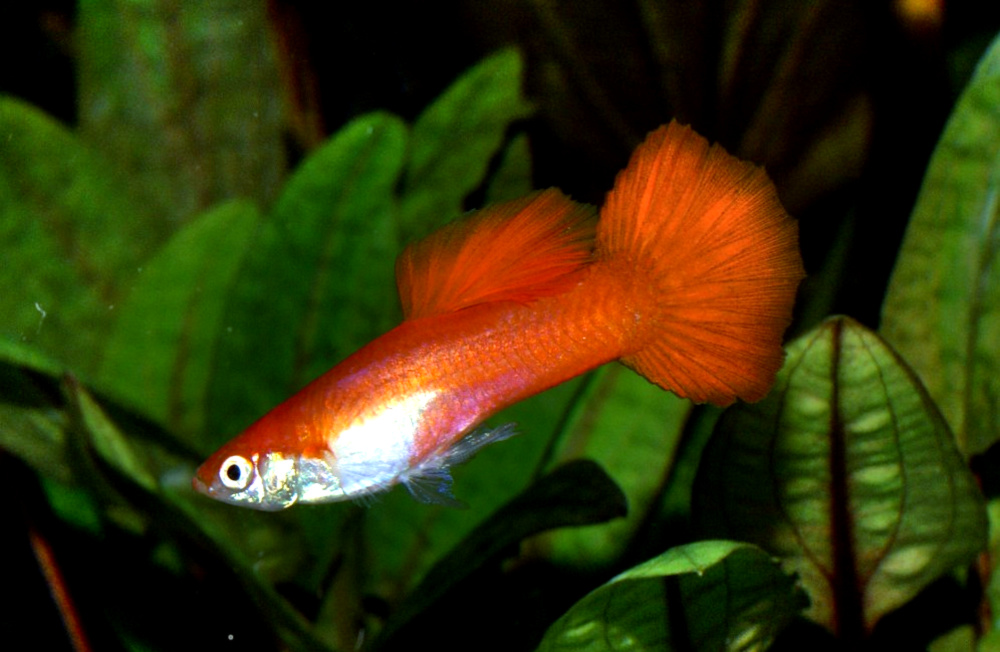
Male guppy

In local enhancement, a demonstrator attracts an observer's attention to a particular location. One seminal study with guppies (Poecilia reticulata) demonstrated how local enhancement influenced foraging behavior. Untrained adult female guppies (observers) were given five days of experience swimming with demonstrator fish trained to take one of two equivalent routes to food. When these observers were later isolated, they preferentially used the route their demonstrators had used. These results indicate that guppies learn about their local environments through the social learning mechanism of local enhancement.

Local enhancement has also been observed to transmit foraging information in among birds, rats, and pigs.

=== Opportunity providing ===
Opportunity providing is a social learning mechanism in which the experienced individual puts the observer in a situation that facilitates the acquisition of knowledge or a new skill. A well known example of unintentional opportunity providing is the transmission of feeding behavior in black rats (Rattus rattus). One pilot study determined that black rats living in the forests of Palestine preferentially fed on pine cones instead of other fresh fruits and vegetation nearby. These rats also methodically stripped pine cones rather than gnawing at them randomly. To determine how these food preferences developed, researchers provided naive adult black rats with fresh pine cones in captivity and observed their behavior. After three months of experimentation, they found that none of the rats had successfully opened the pine cones and had instead haphazardly and inefficiently attempted to feed on the cones. In further experiments, the rats were allowed to observe experienced individuals opening the pine cones but were still unable to pick up the skill of pinecone stripping. Eventually, the researchers determined that naive adult rats could learn to strip pine cones efficiently if presented with an already partially stripped cone. This is consistent with opportunity providing because experienced individuals inadvertently provide naive rats with partially stripped cones that facilitate their learning without altering the experienced rats' behavior.

Opportunity providing has also been found to be important in the acquisition of tool use by chimpanzees, in which a mother chimpanzee may contribute to the development of her offspring's nut cracking technique by leaving "hammer", either hard wood or rocks, and nuts in the nest. The infant is thus given the chance to use the hammer in the "proper" context. The mother chimpanzee may provide this opportunity unknowing or actively depending on the situation.

=== Stimulus enhancement and observational conditioning ===
In stimulus enhancement, a demonstrator exposes an observer to a particular stimulus, leading to the observer learning the relationship between a stimulus and its result. A study investigating stimulus enhancement in greylag geese (Anser anser) found that individuals that had previously observed a human opening a box preferentially spent more time investigating the box and attempting to open it via trial and error. These geese were also more successful at eventually opening the box in comparison to control geese that had not previously observed a human opening the box.

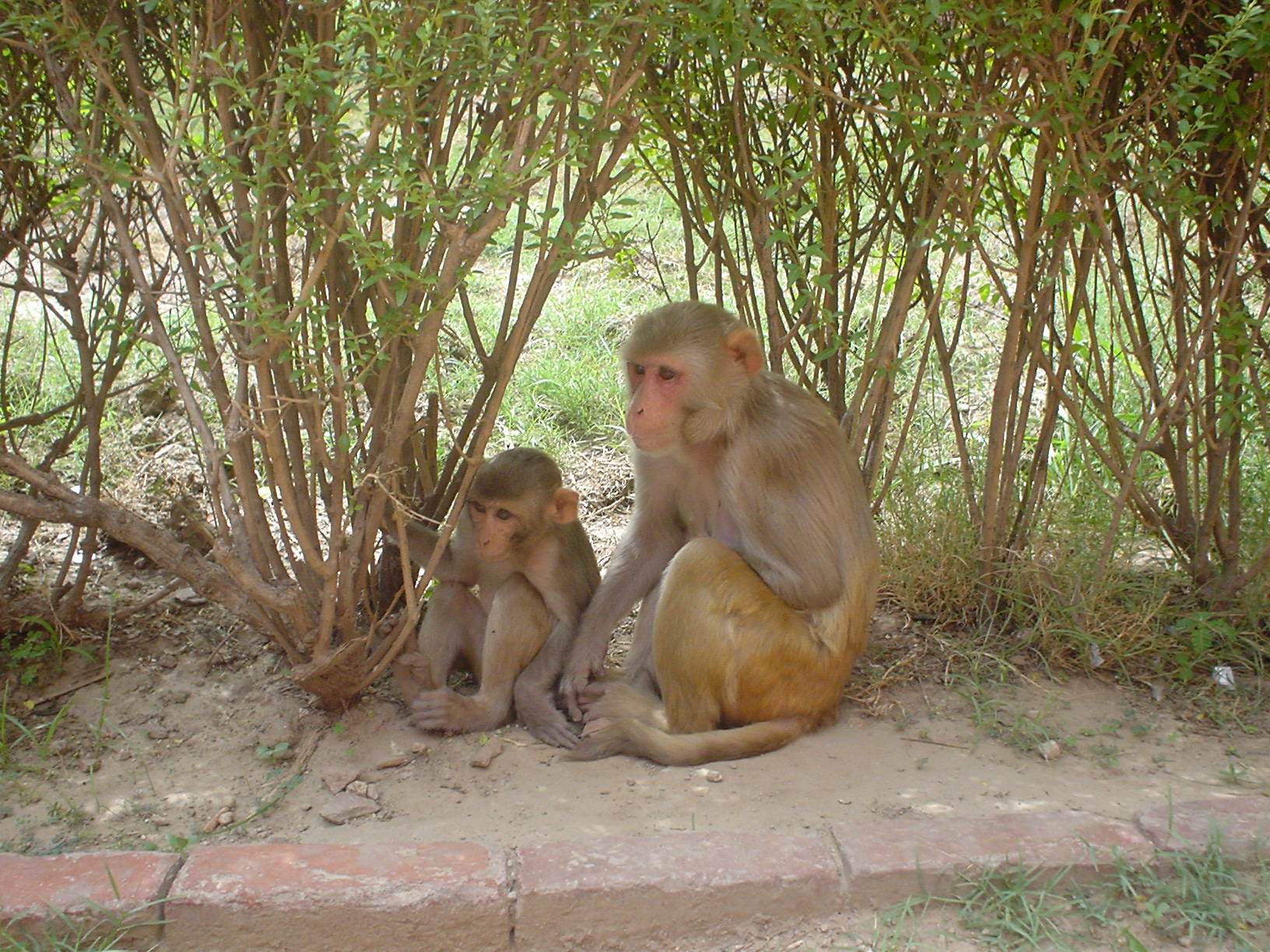
One adult female and one young rhesus macaque

Observational conditioning is a phenomenon similar to stimulus enhancement. In observational conditioning, the behavior of the demonstrator exposes the learner to a new relationship between stimuli that it had not previously known, and causes the learner to form an association between them. In an experiment with rhesus macaques (Macaca mulatta), young monkeys that observed their parents fearfully responding to model snakes also developed a fear of snakes without direct contact. After three months, the observer rhesus macaques still showed strong fearful reactions toward snakes, suggesting that they had formed a strong connection from just observing their parents' behavior. Another example of this is how blackbirds learn to identify predators; they observe other birds mobbing unfamiliar objects they haven't seen before.

=== Imitation and emulation ===
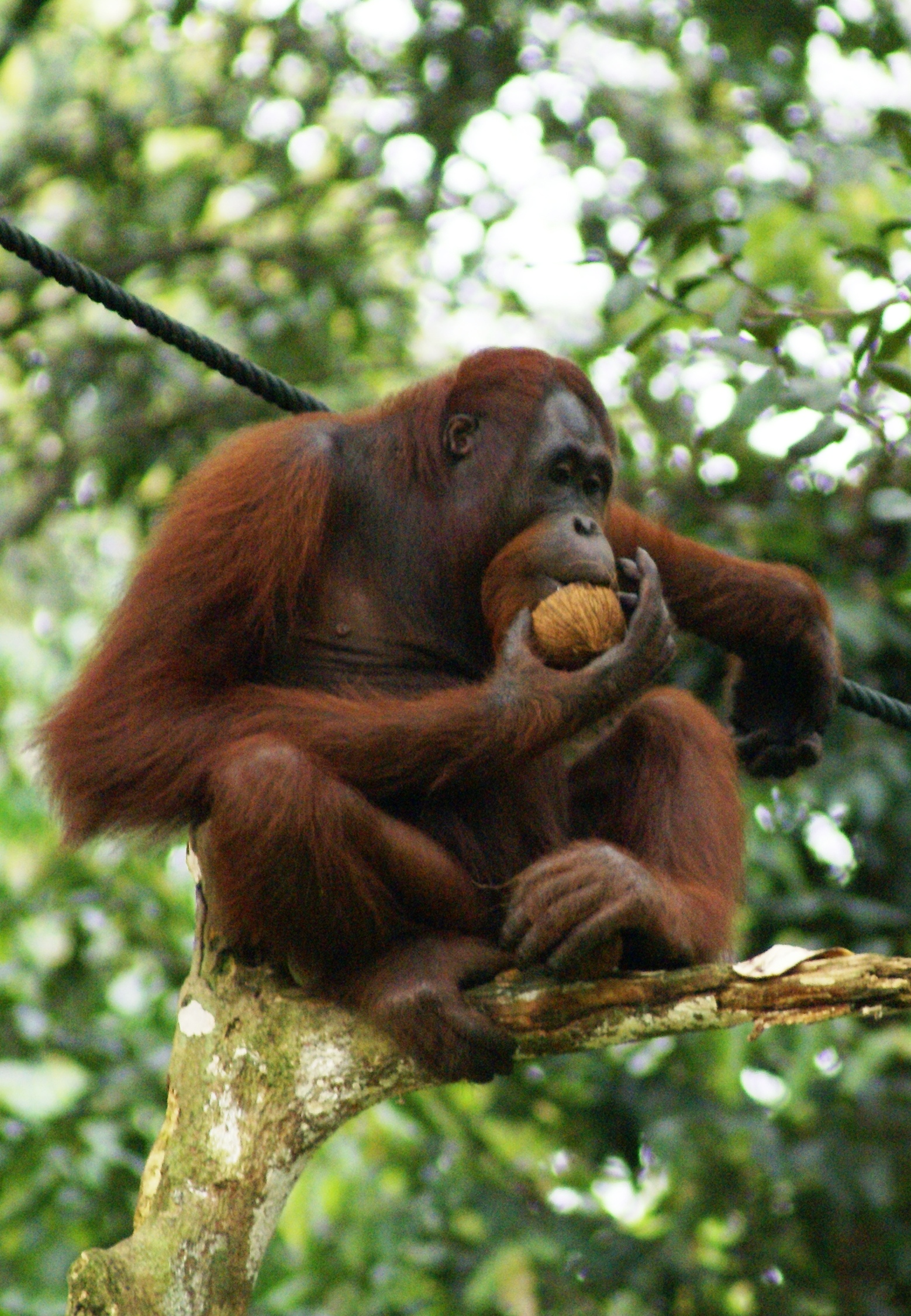
Orangutan eating a coconut

Though the exact definition of imitation is a topic of debate within scientific literature, broadly, in imitation a learner observes a unique action performed by the demonstrator and learns to reproduce the behavior with detectable behavior matching. (This differs from "copying" in which the learner reproduces that same action but this is performed with a different part of the body e.g. the left paw is used instead of the right paw.)

Emulation is similar to imitation in that after observing a demonstrator interacting with objects in its environment, an observer is more likely to act to bring about a similar effect on those objects, but not necessarily through the same method. For example, emulation may include using a tool to achieve a goal such as reaching otherwise inaccessible food after observing another to do such a task but using the tool in a different way than the model. The term 'emulation' encompasses a scope of distinct social learning processes, including object movement re-enactment, end-state emulation, and affordance learning. Object movement re-enactment is the extraction and copying of certain steps of a process of a model moving an object. End-state emulation is the copying of the results of a model's actions using the observer's own unique means. Affordance learning deals with the idea that an observer can gain information about physical properties of the environment and objects within it and how those may interact and then use such information to complete a task.

One key distinction between imitation and emulation is copying fidelity. High-fidelity is associated with imitation. In studies comparing behaviors of chimpanzees and human children, the human children were typically shown to perform high-fidelity imitation, what may even be considered 'over-imitation.' Meanwhile chimpanzee responses depended more on context such as causal relevance of actions. Fidelity of behavior copying and transfer reportedly plays a role in cultural transmission, so understanding copying fidelity in non-human animals may be important for understanding their capacity for cultural transmission and cumulative culture.

Much of the research that has been conducted on imitation and emulation in animals has centered around primates due to their advanced cognitive capacities and evolutionary proximity to humans. Examples of studies that have explored these capacities and tendencies in primates are listed in a table within the 'Research on Imitation and Emulation in Primates' section below.

Beyond the studies listed, in a naturalistic environment, imitative learning is seen in many animal species. Many species of songbirds learn their songs through imitation, and it has been hypothesized that chimpanzees' understanding of intentionality of action in other members of a social group influences their imitative behaviors.

==== Imitation of birdsong ====
As a sexually selected trait, variation in learning of songbird calls is often studied. Lahti et al. performed a study on swamp sparrows (Melospiza georgiana) where young sparrows were exposed to song models with controlled trill rates. Higher trill rates are more difficult to perform and thus are likely more desired in birdsong performance. When exposed to low-performance models, it was found that the learner sparrows sacrificed imitative accuracy for higher performance, while when exposed to high-performance models, imitation was very accurate. The researchers suggest that this study may provide insight into how behaviors learned through imitation can still be selected for due to level of performance.

Sewall explored the variation in learned bird songs in relation to social and genetic intermixing of families of red crossbills (Loxia curvirostra). When given to foster parents, it was shown that fledgling crossbills will imitate the particular variations in their foster parents' calls. It was thus hypothesized that such idiosyncrasies in call could aid in creating familial cohesion and that when such call variants are passed down generations, those variants are direct signals of the crossbill's genetic and familial history.

MacDougall-Shackleton summarized research that suggests developmental stressors affect bird song learning, and that such discrepancies in call can be identified and selected against in some species of birds. He suggests that while many studies have shown that several species of songbirds prefer the song dialect of their local area, current data is lacking in explaining why this is so. It has been argued that genetic factors may play into this preference as well as social learning. In this study, three separate groups of laboratory-raised house finches (Carpodacus mexicanus) were raised hearing the local song dialect, a foreign song dialect, or no song. When adults, all finches showed sexual preference for the local dialect, suggesting an inherited component to song preference.

==== Visual behavioral imitation ====
Pigeons are able to learn behaviors that lead to the delivery of a reward by watching a demonstrator pigeon. A demonstrator pigeon was trained to peck a panel in response to one stimulus (e.g. a red light) and hop on the panel in response to a second stimulus (e.g. a green light). After proficiency in this task was established in the demonstrator pigeon, other learner pigeons were placed in a video-monitored observation chamber. After every second observed trial, these learner pigeons were then individually placed in the demonstrator pigeon's box and presented the same test. The learner pigeons displayed competent performance on the task, and thus it was concluded that the learner pigeons had formed a response-outcome association while observing. However, the researchers noted that an alternative interpretation of these results could be that the learner pigeons had instead acquired outcome-response associations that guided their behavior and that further testing was needed to establish if this was a valid alternative.

The performance of opening an artificial fruit after watching a demonstrator was tested in groups of adult pig-tailed macaques (Macaca nemestrina) and compared to adult humans. The macaques showed weak evidence of imitative learning compared to the adult humans. It was hypothesized that because the macaques were adults, they were less likely to imitate than juvenile monkeys, as accurate imitation may be an adaptation that is more useful to juveniles.

==== Mechanisms for imitative learning ====
Mechanisms that support imitative learning have been studied on the neurological level. Roberts et al. performed research on zebra finches (Taeniopygia guttata) that explored the importance of neural motor circuitry on birdsong learning. If the premotor nucleus was disrupted while a juvenile finch was learning a song from an older finch, the song was not copied. Images of a finch undergoing various neural manipulations showed that premotor circuits aid in encoding information about songs.

Mirror neurons have been implicated as the link in primate brains between visual observation and motor representation. These special neurons, originally discovered in area F5 of the ventral premotor cortex of monkeys, are activated when an individual performs a certain action and when that individual observes another (human or monkey) performing a similar action. Ferrari, Bonini, and Fogassi worked to explain how the mirror neuron framework could account for imitation of a multiple phenomena with ranging complexities and cognitive demands; they proposed a 'direct mirror pathway' for earlier, more automatic imitation and an 'indirect mirror pathway' that seems important for more complex and efficient imitative behaviors.

Behavioral mechanisms have also been studied. Cecilia Heyes at the University of Oxford argues that the mechanisms underlying social learning in both humans and nonhumans are analogous to those of non-social learning. Observational learning, then, only becomes social when perceptual, attentional, and motivational factors are focused on other organisms by genetic or developmental forces.

==== Research on Imitation and Emulation in Primates ====
In considering imitation and emulation in non-human animals, much of the research has centered around the presence or absence of these abilities in primates. The table below provides an overview of the field of research related to possible imitation and emulation in primates.

Likely learning mechanism	Positive or negative support	Genus	Behavior(s)	Citation
Imitation	Positive	Pongo (Orangutan)	Kiss imitation	Abel (1818)
Imitation	Positive	Pongo (Orangutan)	Digging with spade	Furness (1916)
Imitation	Positive	Pongo (Orangutan)	Lifting lid of sewage tank	Yerkes and Yerkes (1927)
Imitation	Positive	Pongo (Orangutan)	Building nests, feeding habits	Harrison (1960)
Imitation	Positive	Pongo (Orangutan)	Flaking stone tools	Wright (1972)
Imitation	Positive	Pongo (Orangutan)	Tool use	Galdikas (1982)
Imitation	Positive	Macaca (Macaque)	Opening oysters with stones	Carpenter (1887)
Imitation	Positive	Macaca (Macaque)	Plug pulling, lever pressing, box opening	Kinnaman (1902)
Imitation	Positive	Macaca (Macaque)	Botanical collection (assisting experimenter)	Carner (1955)
Imitation	Positive	Macaca (Macaque)	Potato washing, rice throwing, consumption of caramel	Imanishi (1957)
Imitation	Positive	Macaca (Macaque)	Jumping over barrier to avoid electric shock	Presley and Riopelle (1959)
Imitation	Positive	Macaca (Macaque)	Fear response	Miller et al. (1959)
Imitation	Positive	Macaca (Macaque)	Throwing tool at unreachable food	Beck (1976)
Imitation	Positive	Macaca (Macaque)	Reaching food with metal rods	Anderson (1985)
Imitation	Positive	Macaca (Macaque)	Fear of snakes	Cook et al. (1985)
Imitation	Positive	Pan (Specifically Chimpanzees)	Door opening, using keys in locks, regulating water supply with lever, scrubbing floor, sweeping with broom	Rothman and Teuber (1915)
Imitation	Positive	Pan (Specifically Chimpanzees)	Opening watch	Shepherd (1915)
Imitation	Positive	Pan (Specifically Chimpanzees)	Digging with spade, screwing screw, scrubbing, sweeping	Furness (1916)
Imitation	Positive	Pan (Specifically Chimpanzees)	Wiping nose with handkerchief, hammering nails, sewing	Sheak (1923)
Imitation	Positive	Pan (Specifically Chimpanzees)	Using paintbrush, stacking boxes to reach banana	Kohler (1925)
Imitation	Positive	Pan (Specifically Chimpanzees)	Washing clothes	Kearton (1925)
Imitation	Positive	Pan (Specifically Chimpanzees)	Brushing hair, opening cupboards	Kellogg and Kellogg (1933)
Imitation	Positive	Pan (Specifically Chimpanzees)	Spitting, imitating facial expressions	Yerkes (1943)
Imitation	Positive	Pan (Specifically Chimpanzees)	Brushing hair, applying lipstick, brushing teeth, sharpening pencils	Hayes (1951)
Imitation	Positive	Pan (Specifically Chimpanzees)	Imitation on command	Hayes and Hayes (1951)
Imitation	Positive	Pan (Specifically Chimpanzees)	Solving stick and tunnel problems, solving stick and string problems, throwing ball	Hayes and Hayes (1952)
Imitation	Positive	Pan (Specifically Chimpanzees)	Patting head, clapping hands, sticking out tongue	Hayes and Hayes (1953)
Imitation	Positive	Pan (Specifically Chimpanzees)	Termite Fishing	van Lawick-Goodall (1973)
Imitation	Positive	Pan (Specifically Chimpanzees)	Cracking nuts with stones, techniques for reaching lower tree branches	Sugiyama and Koman (1979)
Imitation	Positive	Pan (Specifically Chimpanzees)	Limping gait	De Waal (1982)
Imitation	Positive	Pan (Specifically Chimpanzees)	Ant species selection	Nishida and Hiraiwa (1982)
Imitation	Positive	Pan (Specifically Chimpanzees)	Cracking walnuts with stones	Sumita et al. (1985)
Imitation	Positive	Pan (Specifically Chimpanzees)	Sign language	Fouts et al (1989)
Imitation	Positive	Pan (Specifically Chimpanzees)	Play initiation by throwing chips	Tomasello et al. (1989)
Imitation	Positive	Pan (Specifically Chimpanzees)	Trigger light or sound by using head, foot, or sitting (greater imitation when observed was hands free and making unconstrained action)	Buttelmann et al. (2007)
Imitation	Positive	Pan (Specifically Chimpanzees)	Action imitation	Carrasco et al. (2009)
Imitation	Positive	Gorilla	Matching moods and play behaviors	Carpenter (1937)
Imitation	Positive	Papio (Baboon)	Digging in certain locations	Hall (1963)
Imitation	Positive	Papio (Baboon)	Fruit cracking with stones	Marais (1969)
Imitation	Positive	Papio (Baboon)	Fishing	Hamilton and Tilson (1985)
Imitation	Positive	Ateles (Spider Monkey)	Putting things in mouth, bell ringing, object examination, bucket interactions	Chevalier-Skolnikoff (1989)
Imitation	Positive	Cebus (Capuchin)	Banging objects together, putting tub in moat, putting cloth on branch	Chevalier-Skolnikoff (1989)
Imitation	Negative	Cebus	Box opening	Thorndike (1901)
Imitation	Negative	Cebus	Cracking nuts	Antinucci and Visalberghi (1986)
Imitation	Negative	Cebus	Cracking nuts	Visalberghi (1987)
Imitation	Negative	Cebus	Probing for syrup	Westergaard and Fragaszy (1987)
Imitation	Negative	Cebus	Puzzle solving	Adams-Curtis (1987)
Imitation	Negative	Cebus	Moving reward in tube	Visalberghi and Trinca (1987)
Imitation	Negative	Cebus	Nut cracking, moving reward in tube with stick	Fragaszy and Visalberghi (1989)
Imitation	Negative	Papio	Reaching food with tool	Beck (1972)
Imitation	Negative	Macaca	Reaching pan using stick	Beck (1974)
Emulation	Positive	Pan (Specifically Chimpanzees)	Reaching food with tool	Tomasello et al. (1987)
Emulation	Positive	Pan (Specifically Chimpanzees)	Reaching food with tool	Nagell et al. (1993)
Emulation	Positive	Pan (Specifically Chimpanzees)	Tube opening	Call et al. (2005)
Emulation	Positive	Pan (Specifically Chimpanzees)	Accessing food reward from puzzle box (in clear condition when causal vs irrelevant steps could be observed)	Horner and Whiten (2005)
Emulation	Positive	Pongo	Reaching food with tool	Call and Tomasello (1994)

== At different life stages ==
Rats use social learning in a wide range of situations, but perhaps especially so in acquiring food preferences. Learning about suitable foods can be divided into four life stages.

- Before birth: In utero, fetal rats detect odor-bearing particles that come from their mother's diet and cross the placental barrier. Shortly after birth, newborn rats respond positively to these foods.
- During nursing: Nursing rats receive information about their mother's diet through her milk. They prefer the foods she ate during lactation.
- Weaning: When young rats are weaning and eating solid foods for the first time, they use adult rats as guides. They forage where the adults are foraging or where adults have previously scent-marked.
- Adolescence and adulthood: When rats forage on their own, their food choices are influenced by social interactions that may take place far away from foraging sites. They smell foods on the fur, whiskers and especially the breath of other rats and strongly prefer the foods those rats had previously eaten.

== Teaching ==
Many of the mechanisms involved in inadvertent social learning are also employed during teaching; the distinction is drawn based upon the role of the demonstrator. From the perspective of the pupil, teaching would be identical to its inadvertent social learning equivalent, but in teaching, a tutor actively demonstrates a behavior pattern or draws attention to a location with the specific function of transmitting information to the pupil. An individual must meet three criteria to qualify as a "teacher": it modifies its behavior only in the presence of a naive observer, it incurs some cost (or at least, no benefit) to itself in doing so, and the naive observer acquires knowledge or skill more rapidly or efficiently than it might otherwise. All of these criteria are rarely met in animals, and only recently have convincing examples been adequately described. Most identified examples have still not been conclusively proven to meet all criteria and primarily serve to suggest that teaching may occur while acknowledging that further research is needed.

Adult killer whales (Orcinus orca) teach the predatory technique of "stranding" to their young. Stranding in these circumstances is a behavior in which a whale temporarily beaches itself to reach prey on land near to the shoreline. Adult whales have been observed helping juveniles with many aspects of this behavior by pushing them up and down the beach, guiding them towards prey, and intervening when the juveniles find themselves in danger. Adults only engage in this behavior with apparently naive juveniles. They are more successful when hunting alone than when teaching juveniles, but case studies suggest that juveniles taught the stranding technique by adults are able to master it more than a year earlier than their non-taught peers.

Coaching appears to occur in other species as well. In domestic chickens, adult hens encourage safe food choices by responding with increased pecking and scratching at palatable food when chicks consume apparently unpalatable food.

=== Providing opportunities ===
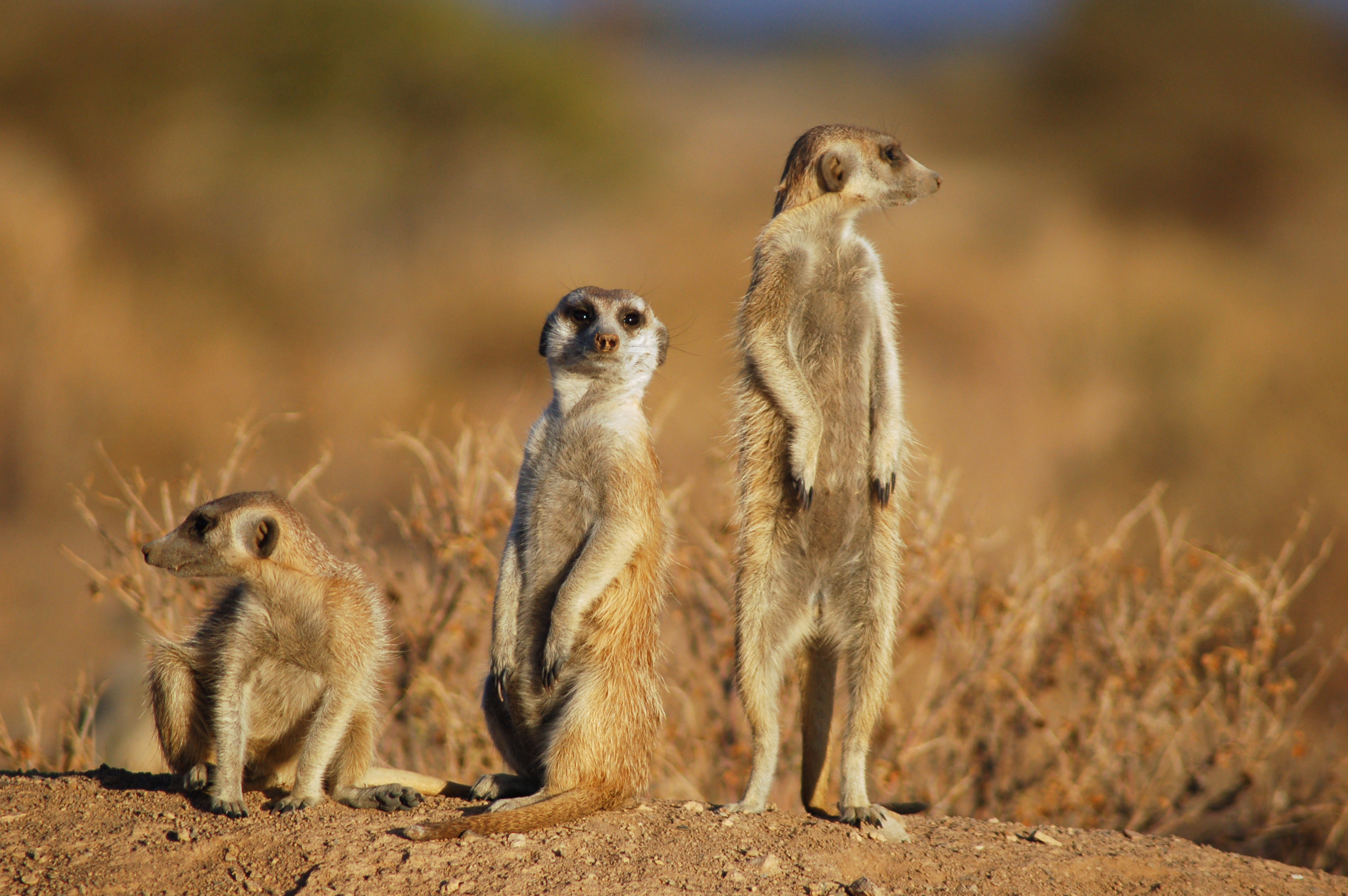
Adult meerkats search for prey.

Adult meerkats (Suricata suricatta) have been shown to teach pups essential prey-handling skills. Meerkats often consume dangerous prey (such as venomous scorpions) that inexperienced pups appear unable to safely subdue and consume without assistance from older individuals. Adults only display teaching behavior in response to pup begging calls, and adults modify their specific teaching behaviors based upon the age of the pup begging (providing more assistance to younger, presumably less experienced pups). In some instances, providing prey to pups appears costly to adults. Pups are initially unable to find and consume any of their own prey and more rapidly gain predatory abilities through learning experiences from a "teacher", suggesting that adult teaching facilitates both the speed and efficiency of skill acquisition.

Other species appear to similarly teach their young through the provisioning of weakened or otherwise subdued prey. In both cheetahs and domestic cats, adults catch live prey animals and transport them back to cubs, allowing the cubs to learn and practice hunting skills.

=== Using local enhancement ===
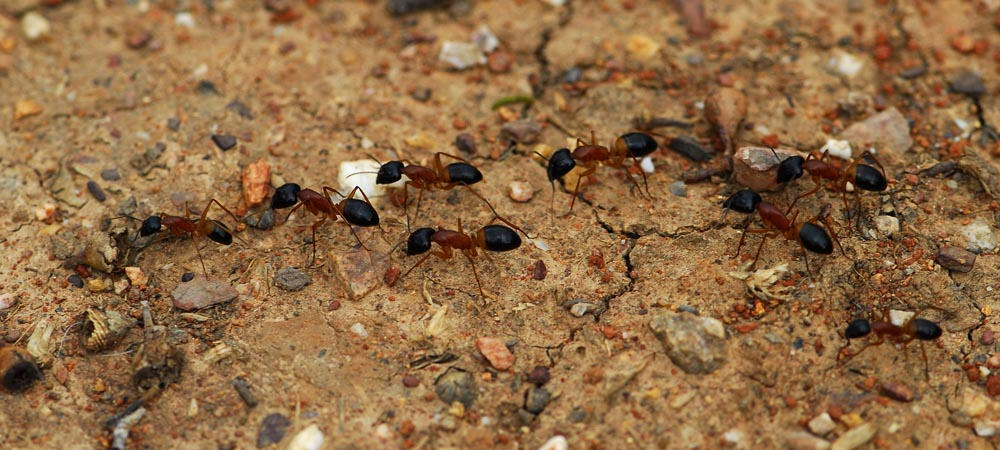
The lead worker (on the left) has returned to the nest and is leading the remaining workers back to the food source via tandem running.

Tandem running in ants provides evidence that teaching can occur even without a large brain with complex cognitive abilities. This behavior is shown by an ant who has located a food source in order to guide a naive ant to the desired location. The leading ant only continues the tandem run if the following ant frequently taps on the leader's body, showing that the leader (teacher) modifies its behavior in the presence of the naive follower. Tandem running appears to impose a significant cost on the leader, slowing its speed to ¼ of what it would be if running alone. But the benefit is clear: evidence suggests that followers find food much more quickly through tandem running than from searching alone.

Other evidence of teaching through local enhancement can be seen in a variety of species. In bees, knowledgeable workers perform a waggle dance to guide naive workers to an identified food source. This dance provides information about the direction, distance and quality of the food source. In callitrichid monkeys, adults emit "food-offering" vocalizations only in the presence of infants that appear to indicate the presence of food or discovery of a hidden prey item.

== Relevance of social learning ==
Social learning is a beneficial means to gather information if asocial learning is particularly costly and would increase risk of predation, parasitism, or of expending unnecessary energy. In these types of scenarios, social learners may observe the behaviors of an experienced individual. This allows the observer to gain information about the environment without individually being put at risk.

=== Learning about predators ===
An animal generally learns its natural predators through direct experience. Thus, predator learning is very costly and increases the predation risk for each individual. In group learning scenarios, a few members can experience the danger of predation and transmit this acquired predator recognition throughout the group. Consequently, in future encounters, the entire group can recognize the threat of predation and respond accordingly. This social learning method has been shown in group mobbing behavior in the common blackbird (Turdus merula). Blackbird groups were more likely to mob an object if a member of the group had previously been conditioned to recognize it as a predator. This behavior has also been recorded in guppies, where naive guppies from environments with less natural predators significantly improved their anti-predator behavior when placed in a group with guppies from a high predation environment.

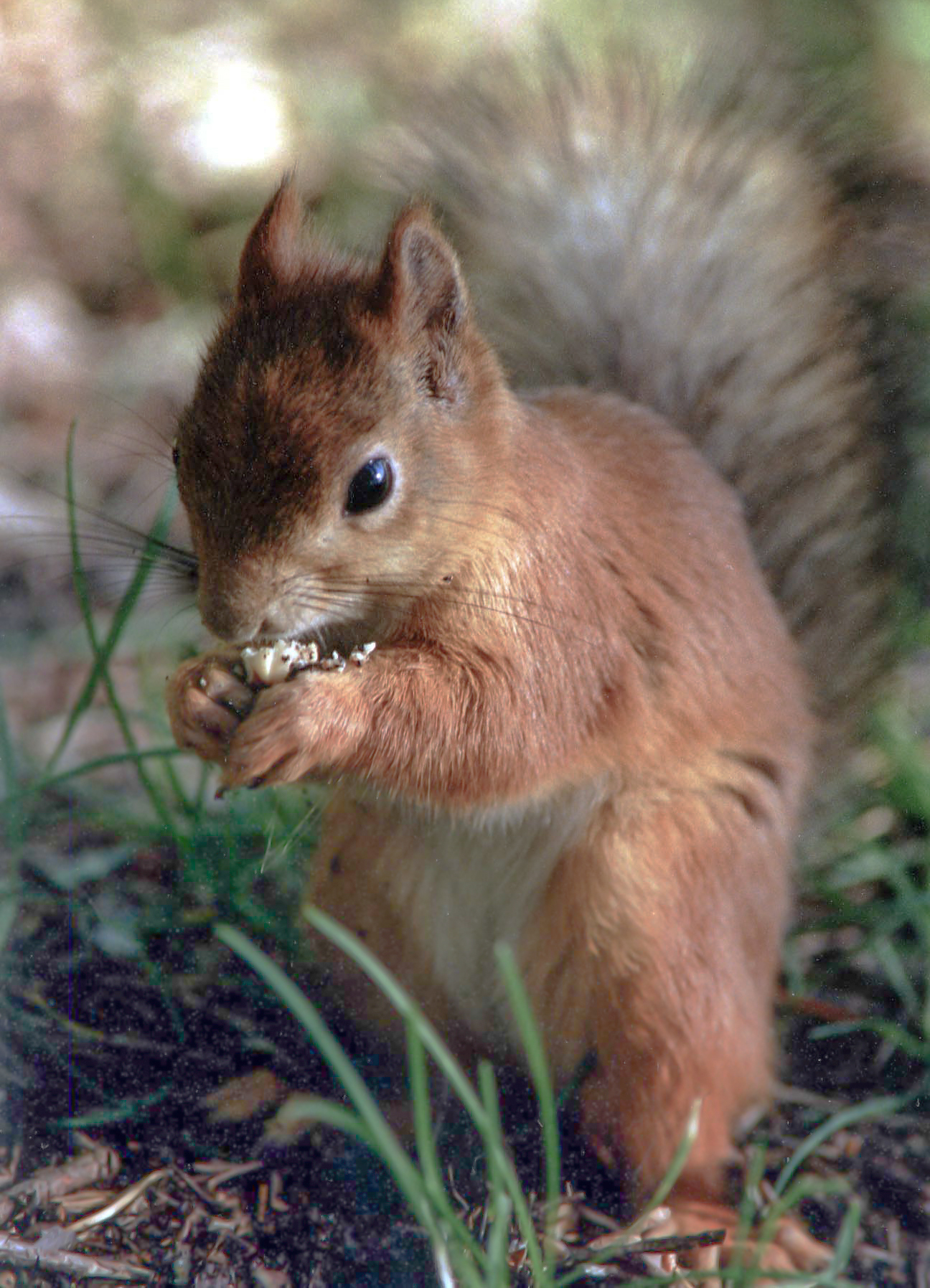
Red squirrels are more successful at opening nuts after watching an experienced individual.

=== Learning about brood parasites ===
Learning about brood parasites through direct experience can also be costly and error-prone. Birds can actively defend themselves against brood parasitism from cuckoos and cowbirds via a variety of behaviors, including mobbing, and these too can be socially learned. For example, a study on Eurasian reed warblers (Acrocephalus scirpaceus) showed that individuals that observed their neighbors mob of common cuckoo (Cuculus canorus) were subsequently more likely to mob cuckoos but not harmless controls. These results indicate that social learning provides a mechanism by which hosts can rapidly increase their nest defense against brood parasites, enabling the hosts to track fine-scale spatiotemporal variation in the local risk of brood parasitism.

=== Learning about foraging opportunities ===
Social learning also provides individuals with information about food sources in an environment. This can include information on where to find food, what to eat, and how to eat it. There are several examples in the animal kingdom in which animals utilize social learning to find food. For example, birds are more likely to forage in areas where they already see birds feeding. The Norway rat (Rattus norvegicus) also utilizes social learning behaviors to find food sources. Mature rats leave sensory trails to and from food sources that are preferentially followed by naive pups. Animals can also learn what to eat from social learning with conspecifics. Experimentally discerning harmful foods from edible foods can be dangerous for a naive individual; however, inexperienced individuals can avoid this cost through observing older individuals that already have acquired this knowledge. For example, several species of bird will avoid food if they see another individual eat it and become ill. Observation can also educate the observer about how to eat particular foods. Red squirrels (Sciurus vulgaris) have been shown to more successfully open hickory nuts after watching more experienced squirrels open the nuts.

== Maladaptive examples of social learning ==
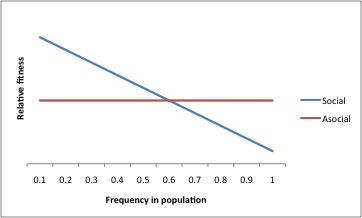
While asocial learners' fitness remains relatively unchanged regardless of frequency, social learners' fitness is higher when they are relatively rare in the population. Social learners' fitness decreases as their frequency increases.

Social learning does not necessarily mean that the transmitted behavior is the most efficient response to a stimulus. If a socially learned behavior expends unnecessary energy, and there is a more efficient strategy that is not being utilized, employing social learning is maladaptive. This has been experimentally demonstrated in guppies. After a group of guppies was trained to swim a more energetically costly route to food, naive guppies were added to the group. These new members were more likely to follow the larger group even if a shorter, more effective route was provided; however, if the naive guppies were not introduced to the trained individuals, they preferentially used the more efficient route to the food source. Norway rats have been shown to abandon previously individually learned habits due to the actions of conspecifics. Rats modified established aversions to certain foods if they observed conspecifics eating those same foods. If this previous aversion was formed for adaptive reasons (i.e. the food was nutrient-poor), reversion to consumption of this food source could reduce the fitness of the individual. More theoretically, social learning can become maladaptive after a certain point in animal populations. If there are more social learners than asocial learners in a particular group, the information transferred between individuals is less likely to be reliable. This could result in maladaptive information transfer to social learners, decreasing the fitness for social learners in comparison to that of asocial learners. Therefore, social learning is only an adaptive strategy if the number of individual learners is equal to or greater than the number of social learners.

== Local traditions ==
When many individuals residing within the same area employ social learning, local traditions can be formed and cultural transmission can occur. These learned behavior complexes shared by individuals appear in the population generation after generation and persist in the behavioral repertoire of individual organisms even following removal from the immediate learning situation. One of the most commonly recognized examples of tradition in animals is found in songbirds, in which the same song pattern is transmitted from generation to generation by vocal imitation. Even "alien" syllable types not produced by their biological parents can be learned by finches raised by foster canaries in the lab.

If copying errors are common, or if each observer adds individually learned modifications to a new behavior pattern, stable traditions are unlikely to develop and persist over time. However, even when no longer adaptive, traditions can be passed down if individuals learn primarily through observing experienced individuals rather than through asocial learning techniques. This was observed in guppies in the laboratory, in the group foraging example explained above. Even when the originally trained "founder" guppies were removed from the group and only initially naive individuals (trained by the founders) were present, the tradition persisted and new guppies learned the costly path. Socially learning the more costly route also resulted in slower learning of the more efficient route when it was subsequently presented, suggesting that even maladaptive strategies can be socially learned and incorporated into local traditions.

== See also ==
- Animal culture
