= Animal culture =

Theory of cultural learning in non-human animals

Animal culture can be defined as the ability of non-human animals to learn and transmit behaviors through processes of social or cultural learning. Culture is increasingly seen as a process, involving the social transmittance of behavior among peers and between generations. It can involve the transmission of novel behaviors or regional variations that are independent of genetic or ecological factors.

The existence of culture in non-humans has been a contentious subject, sometimes forcing researchers to rethink "what it is to be human". The notion of culture in other animals dates back to Aristotle in classical antiquity, and more recently to Charles Darwin, but the association of other animals' actions with the actual word 'culture' originated with Japanese primatologists' discoveries of socially-transmitted food behaviours in the 1940s. Evidence for animal culture is often based on studies of feeding behaviors, vocalizations, predator avoidance, mate selection, and migratory routes.

An important area of study for animal culture is vocal learning, the ability to make new sounds through imitation. Most species cannot learn to imitate sounds. Some can learn how to use innate vocalizations in new ways. Only a few species can learn new calls. The transmission of vocal repertoires, including some types of bird vocalization, can be viewed as social processes involving cultural transmission. Some evidence suggests that the ability to engage in vocal learning depends on the development of specialized brain circuitry, detected in humans, dolphins, bats and some birds. The lack of common ancestors suggests that the basis for vocal learning has evolved independently through evolutionary convergence.

Animal culture can be an important consideration in conservation management. As of 2020, culture and sociality were included in the aspects of the management framework of the Convention on the Conservation of Migratory Species of Wild Animals (CMS).

== Background ==
Culture can be defined as "all group-typical behavior patterns, shared by members of animal communities, that are to some degree reliant on socially learned and transmitted information".

=== Organizational culture ===
One definition of culture, particularly in relation to the organizational aspect is the utilization of "involvement, consistency, adaptation, and mission." Cultural traits that are indicators of a successful form of organization are more likely to be assimilated into our everyday lives. Organizations that utilize the four aforementioned aspects of culture are the ones that are the most successful. Therefore, cultures that are better able to involve their citizens towards a common goal have a much higher rate of effectiveness than those who do not have a shared goal. A further definition of culture is, "[s]ocially transmitted behavior patterns that serve to relate human communities to their ecological settings." This definition connects cultural behavior to the environment. Since culture is a form of adaptation to one's environment, it is mirrored in many aspects of our current and past societies.

=== Cultural sociology ===
Other researchers are currently exploring the idea that there is a connection between cultural sociology and psychology. Certain individuals are especially concerned with the analysis of studies connecting "identity, collective memory, social classification, logics of action, and framing." Views of what exactly culture is have been changing due to the convergence of sociological and psychological thought on the subject by the 1990s. Culture is specific to region and not just one umbrella definition or concept can truly give us the essence of what culture is. Also referenced is the importance of symbols and rituals as cognitive building blocks for a psychological concept of shared culture.

=== Memes and cultural transmission ===
Richard Dawkins argues for the existence of a "unit of cultural transmission" called a meme. This concept of memes has become much more accepted as more extensive research has been done into cultural behaviors. Much as one can inherit genes from each parent, it is suggested that individuals acquire memes through imitating what they observe around them. The more relevant actions (actions that increase ones probability of survival), such as architecture and craftwork are more likely to become prevalent, enabling a culture to form. The idea of memes as following a form of Natural Selection was first presented by Daniel Dennett. It has also been argued by Dennett that memes are responsible for the entirety of human consciousness. He claims that everything that constitutes humanity, such as language and music is a result of memes.

=== Evolutionary culture ===
A closely related concept to memes is the idea of evolutionary culture. The concept of evolutionary culture gained greater acceptance due to the re-evaluation of the term by anthropologists. The broadening scope of evolution from simple genes to more abstract concepts, such as designs and behaviors makes the idea of evolutionary culture more plausible. Evolutionary culture theory is defined as "a theory of cultural phylogeny." The idea that all human culture evolved from one main culture, citing the interconnectedness of languages, has also been presented. There is, however, also the possibility for disparate ancestral cultures, in that the cultures observed today may potentially have stemmed from more than one original culture.

=== Culture in animals ===
According to the Webster's dictionary definition of culture, learning and transmission are the two main components of culture, specifically referencing tool making and the ability to acquire behaviors that will enhance one's quality of life. Using this definition it is possible to conclude that other animals are just as likely to adapt to cultural behaviors as humans. One of the first signs of culture in early humans was the utilization of tools. Chimpanzees have been observed using tools such as rocks and sticks to obtain better access to food. There are other learned activities that have been exhibited by other animals as well. Some examples of these activities that have been shown by varied animals are opening oysters, swimming, washing of food, and unsealing tin lids. This acquisition and sharing of behaviors correlates directly to the existence of memes. It especially reinforces the natural selection component, seeing as these actions employed by other animals are all mechanisms for making their lives easier, and therefore longer.

== History of animal culture theory ==
Though the idea of 'culture' in other animals has only been around for just over half of a century, scientists have been noting social behaviors of other animals for centuries. Aristotle was the first to provide evidence of social learning in the songs of birds. Charles Darwin first attempted to find the existence of imitation in other animals when attempting to prove his theory that the human mind had evolved from that of lower beings. Darwin was also the first to suggest what became known as social learning in attempting to explain the transmission of an adaptive pattern of behavior through a population of honey bees.

=== Whiten's Culture in Chimpanzees ===
Andrew Whiten, professor of Evolutionary and Developmental Psychology at the University of St. Andrews, contributed to the greater understanding of cultural transmission with his work on chimpanzees. In Cultural Traditions in Chimpanzees, Whiten created a compilation of results from seven long-term studies totaling 151 years of observation analyzing behavioral patterns in different communities of chimpanzees in Africa (read more about it below). The study expanded the notion that cultural behavior lies beyond linguistic mediation, and can be interpreted to include distinctive socially learned behavior such as stone-handling and sweet potato washing in Japanese macaques. The implications of their findings indicate that chimpanzee behavioral patterns mimic the distinct behavioral variants seen in different human populations in which cultural transmission has generally always been an accepted concept.

=== Cavalli-Sforza and Feldman models ===
Population geneticists Cavalli-Sforza & Feldman have also been frontrunners in the field of cultural transmission, describing behavioral "traits" as characteristics pertaining to a culture that are recognizable within that culture. Using a quantifiable approach, Cavalli-Sforza & Feldman were able to produce mathematical models for three forms of cultural transmission, each of which have distinct effects on socialization: vertical, horizontal, and oblique.

- Vertical transmission occurs from parents to offspring and is a function which shows that the probability that parents of specific types give rise to an offspring of their own or of another type. Vertical transmission, in this sense, is similar to genetic transmission in biological evolution as mathematical models for gene transmission account for variation. Vertical transmission also contributes strongly to the buildup of between-population variation.
- Horizontal transmission, or non-vertical transmission is cultural transmission that occurs among individuals from the same generation.
- Oblique transmission occurs to offspring from the generation to which their parents belong that is, from adults other than the offspring's parents, such as teachers.

== Mechanisms of cultural transmission in animals ==
Cultural transmission, also known as cultural learning, is the process and method of passing on socially learned information. Within a species, cultural transmission is greatly influenced by how adults socialize with each other and with their young. Differences in cultural transmission across species have been thought to be largely affected by external factors, such as the physical environment, that may lead an individual to interpret a traditional concept in a novel way. The environmental stimuli that contribute to this variance can include climate, migration patterns, conflict, suitability for survival, and endemic pathogens. Cultural transmission can also vary according to different social learning strategies employed at the species and or individual level. Cultural transmission is hypothesized to be a critical process for maintaining behavioral characteristics in both humans and nonhuman animals over time, and its existence relies on innovation, imitation, and communication to create and propagate various aspects of animal behavior seen today.

Not all socially influenced behaviours necessarily depend on copying their behavioural form. The “zone of latent solutions” hypothesis proposes that many behaviours can be individually reinvented, while social learning influences their frequency or distribution without transmitting the behavioural form itself.

Culture, when defined as the transmission of behaviors from one generation to the next, can be transmitted among animals through various methods. The most common of these methods include imitation, teaching, and language. Imitation has been found to be one of the most prevalent modes of cultural transmission in non-human animals, while teaching and language are much less widespread, with the possible exceptions of primates and cetaceans. Some research has suggested that teaching, as opposed to imitation, may be a characteristic of certain animals who have more advanced cultural capacities.

The likelihood of larger groups within a species developing and sharing these intra-species traditions with peers and offspring is much higher than that of one individual spreading some aspect of animal behavior to one or more members. Cultural transmission, as opposed to individual learning, is therefore a more efficient manner of spreading traditions and allowing members of a species to collectively inherit more adaptive behavior. This process by which offspring within a species acquires his or her own culture through mimicry or being introduced to traditions is referred to as enculturation. The role of cultural transmission in cultural evolution, then, is to provide the outlet for which organisms create and spread traditions that shape patterns of animal behavior visibly over generations.

=== Genetic vs. cultural transmission ===
Culture, which was once thought of as a uniquely human trait, is now firmly established as a common trait among animals and is not merely a set of related behaviors passed on by genetic transmission as some have argued. Genetic transmission, like cultural transmission, is a means of passing behavioral traits from one individual to another. The main difference is that genetic transmission is the transfer of behavioral traits from one individual to another through genes which are transferred to an organism from its parents during the fertilization of the egg. As can be seen, genetic transmission can only occur once during the lifetime of an organism. Thus, genetic transmission is quite slow compared to the relative speed of cultural transmission. In cultural transmission, behavioral information is passed through means of verbal, visual, or written methods of teaching. Therefore, in cultural transmission, new behaviors can be learned by many organisms in a matter of days and hours rather than the many years of reproduction it would take for a behavior to spread among organisms in genetic transmission.

=== Social learning ===
Culture can be transmitted among animals through various methods, the most common of which include imitation, teaching, and language. Imitation is one of the most prevalent modes of cultural transmission in non-human animals, while teaching and language are much less widespread. In a study on food acquisition techniques in meerkats (Suricata suricatta), researchers found evidence that meerkats learned foraging tricks through imitation of conspecifics. The experimental setup consisted of an apparatus containing food with two possible methods that could be used to obtain the food. Naïve meerkats learned and used the method exhibited by the "demonstrator" meerkat trained in one of the two techniques. Although in this case, imitation is not the clear mechanism of learning given that the naïve meerkat could simply have been drawn to certain features of the apparatus from observing the "demonstrator" meerkat and from there discovered the technique on their own.

=== Teaching ===
Teaching is often considered one mechanism of social learning, and occurs when knowledgeable individuals of some species have been known to teach others. For this to occur, a teacher must change its behavior when interacting with a naïve individual and incur an initial cost from teaching, while an observer must acquire skills rapidly as a direct consequence.

Until the 1980s, teaching, or social learning, was a skill that was thought to be uniquely human. However, research continued through the 1990s and beyond documented the existence of social learning among animal groups, which is not limited to mammals. Many insects, for example have been observed demonstrating various forms of teaching in order to obtain food. Ants, for example, will guide each other to food sources through a process called "tandem running", in which an ant will guide a companion ant to a source of food. It has been suggested that the "pupil" ant is able to learn this route in order to obtain food in the future or teach the route to other ants. By the early 2000s, various studies that show that cetaceans are able to transmit culture through teaching as well. Orcas are known to "intentionally beach" themselves in order to catch and eat pinnipeds who are breeding on the shore. Mother orcas teach their young to catch pinnipeds by pushing them onto the shore and encouraging them to attack and eat the prey. Because the mother orca is altering her behavior in order to help her offspring learn to catch prey, this is evidence of teaching and cultural learning. The intentional beaching of the orcas, along with other cetacean behaviors such as the variations of songs among humpback whales and the sponging technique used by the bottlenose dolphin to obtain food, provide substantial support for the idea of cetacean cultural transmission.

Teaching is arguably the social learning mechanism that affords the highest fidelity of information transfer between individuals and generations, and allows a direct pathway through which local traditions can be passed down and transmitted.

=== Imitation ===
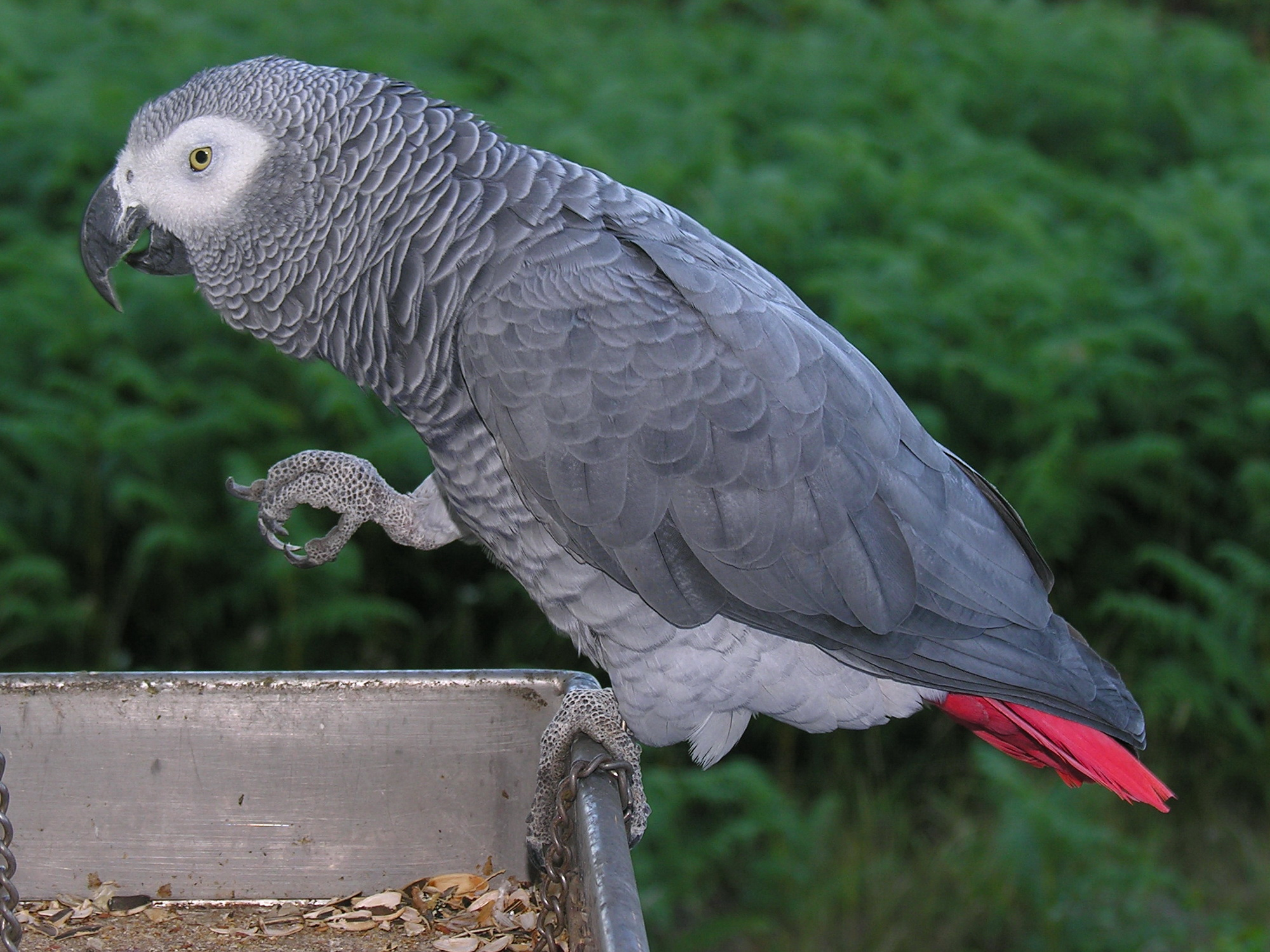
Imitation can be found in a few members of the avian world, in particular the parrot. Imitation forms the basis of culture, but does not on its own imply culture.

Imitation is often misinterpreted as merely the observation and copying of another's actions. This would be known as mimicry, because the repetition of the observed action is done for no other purpose than to copy the original doer or speaker. In the scientific community, imitation is rather the process in which an organism purposefully observes and copies the methods of another in order to achieve a tangible goal. Therefore, the identification and classification of animal behavior as being imitation has been very difficult. By the 2000s, research into imitation in animals had resulted in the tentative labeling of certain species of birds, monkeys, apes, and cetaceans as having the capacity for imitation.

Alex was a grey parrot that underwent a series of tests and experiments at the University of Arizona in which scientist Irene Pepperberg judged his ability to imitate the human language in order to create vocalizations and object labels. Trained by Pepperberg, Alex acquired a large vocabulary of English words and phrases. He was also able to combine these to create novel words that, while meaningless, follow the phonetic rules of the language. Alex's capabilities of using and understanding more than 80 words, along with his ability to put together short phrases, demonstrates how birds, who many people do not credit with having deep intellect, can actually imitate and use rudimentary language skills in an effective manner. The results of this experiment culminated with the conclusion that the use of the English language to refer to objects is not unique to humans and is arguably true imitation, a basic form of cultural learning found in young children.

=== Language ===
Language is another key indicator of animals who have greater potential to possess culture. Though animals do not naturally use words like humans when they are communicating, the well-known parrot Alex demonstrated that even animals with small brains, but are adept at imitation, can have a deeper understanding of language after lengthy training. A bonobo named Kanzi has taken the use of the English language even further. Kanzi was taught to recognize words and their associations by using a lexigram board. Through observation of its mother's language training, Kanzi was able to learn how to use the lexigrams to obtain food and other items that he desired. Also, Kanzi is able to use his understanding of lexigrams to decipher and comprehend simple sentences. For example, when he was told to "give the doggie a shot," Kanzi grabbed a toy dog and a syringe and gave it a realistic injection. This type of advanced behavior and comprehension is what scientists have used as evidence for language-based culture in animals.

== Primate culture ==
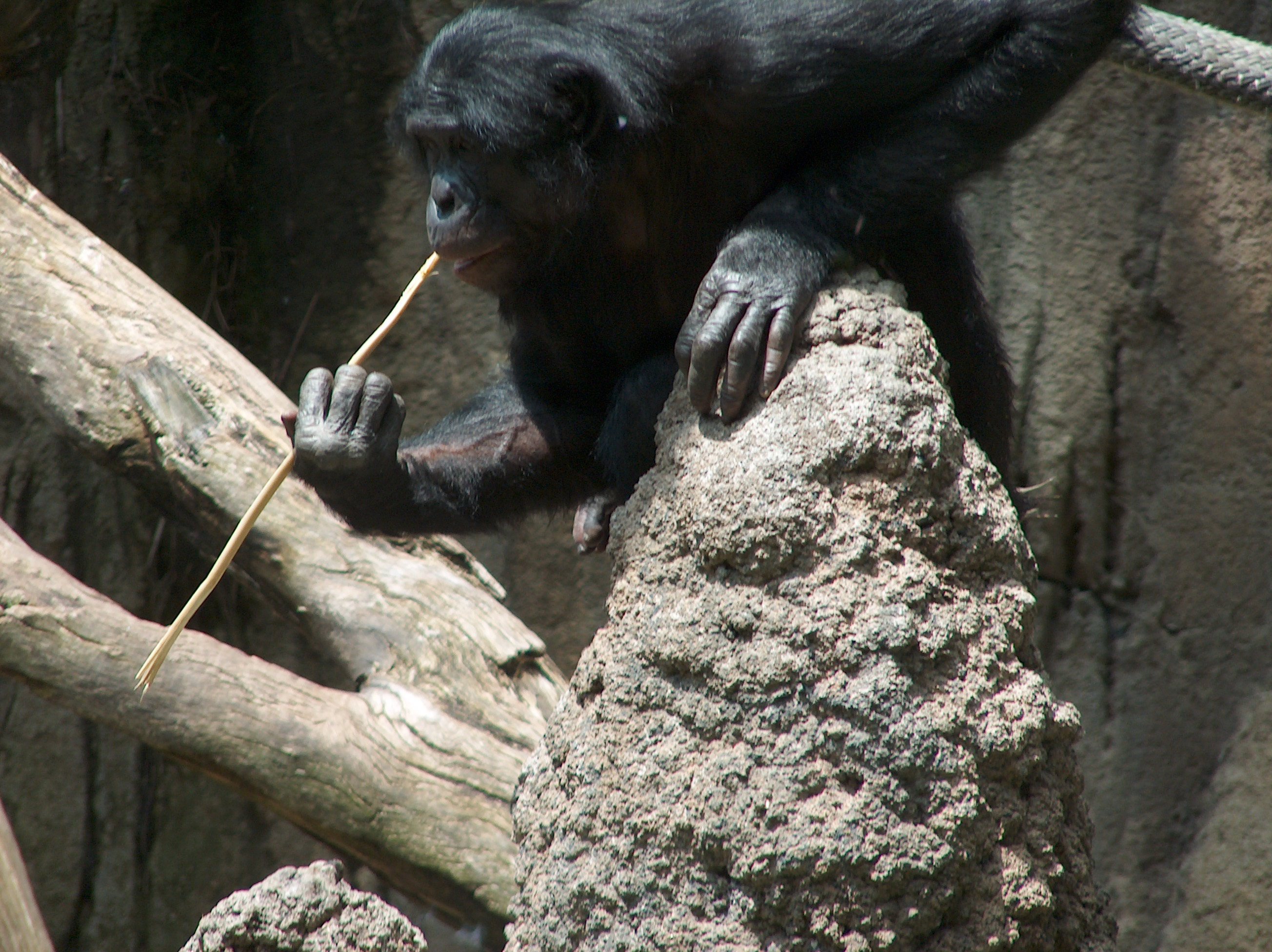
A bonobo fishing for termites using a sharpened stick. Tool usage in acquiring food is believed to be a cultural behavior.

The beginning of the modern era of animal culture research in the middle of the 20th century came with the gradual acceptance of the term "culture" in referring to animals. In 1952, Japan's leading primatologist of the time, Kinji Imanishi, first introduced the idea of "kaluchua" or "pre-culture" in referring to the now famous potato-washing behavior of Japanese macaques.

In 1948, Imanishi and his colleagues began studying macaques across Japan, and began to notice differences among the different groups of primates, both in social patterns and feeding behavior. In one area, paternal care was the social norm, while this behavior was absent elsewhere. One of the groups commonly dug up and ate the tubers and bulbs of several plants, while monkeys from other groups would not even put these in their mouths. Imanishi reasoned that, "if one defines culture as learned by offspring from parents, then differences in the way of life of members of the same species belonging to different social groups could be attributed to culture." Following this logic, the differences Imanishi and his colleagues observed among the different groups of macaques may suggest that they had arisen as a part of the groups' unique cultures.

The most famous of these eating behaviors was observed on the island of Koshima, where one young female was observed carrying soiled sweet potatoes to a small stream, where she proceeded to wash off all of the sand and dirt before eating. This behavior was then observed in one of the monkey's playmates, then her mother and a few other playmates. The potato-washing eventually spread throughout the whole macaque colony. Imanishi introduced the Japanese term kaluchua which was later translated by Masao Kawai and others to refer to the behavior as "pre-culture" and as being acquired through "pre-cultural propagation". The researchers caution that "we must not overestimate the situation and say that 'monkeys have culture' and then confuse it with human culture." At this point, most of the observed behaviors in animals, like those observed by Imanishi, were related to survival in some way.

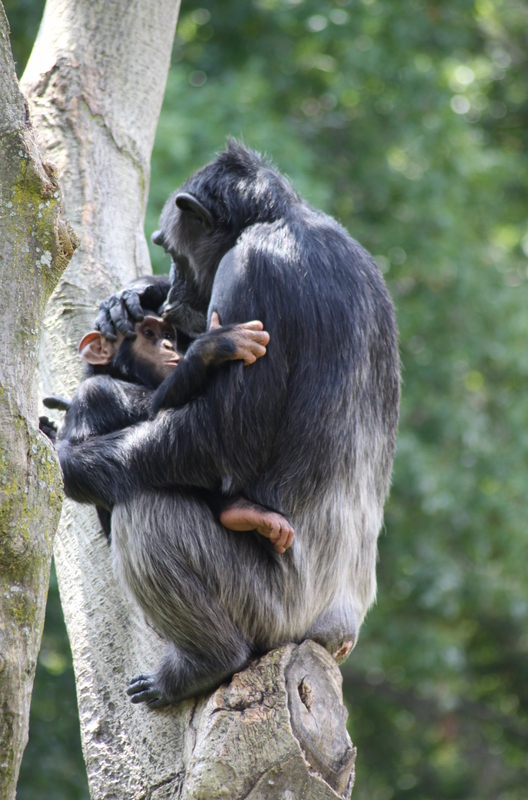
A chimpanzee mother and baby

The first evidence of apparently arbitrary traditions came in the late-1970s, also in the behavior of primates. At this time, researchers McGrew and Tutin found a social grooming handclasp behavior to be prevalent in a certain troop of chimpanzees in Tanzania, but not found in other groups nearby. This grooming behavior involved one chimpanzee taking hold of the hand of another and lifting it into the air, allowing the two to groom each other's armpits. Though this would seem to make grooming of the armpits easier, the behavior actually has no apparent advantage. As the primatologist Frans de Waal explains from his later observations of the hand-clasp grooming behavior in a different group of chimpanzees, "A unique property of the handclasp grooming posture is that it is not required for grooming the armpit of another individual... Thus it appears to yield no obvious benefits or rewards to the groomers."

Prior to these findings, opponents to the idea of animal culture had argued that the behaviors being called cultural were simply behaviors that had evolutionarily evolved due to their importance to survival. After the identification of this initial non-evolutionarily advantageous evidence of culture, scientists began to find differences in group behaviors or traditions in various groups of primates, specifically in Africa. More than 40 different populations of wild chimpanzees have been studied across Africa, between which many species-specific, as well as population-specific, behaviors have been observed. The researching scientists found 65 different categories of behaviors among these various groups of chimpanzees, including the use of leaves, sticks, branches, and stones for communication, play, food gathering or eating, and comfort. Each of the groups used the tools slightly differently, and this usage was passed from chimpanzee to chimpanzee within the group through a complex mix of imitation and social learning.

=== Chimpanzees ===
In 1999, Whiten et al. examined data from 151 years of chimpanzee observation in an attempt to discover how much cultural variation existed between populations of the species. The synthesis of their studies consisted of two phases, in which they (1) created a comprehensive list of cultural variant behavior specific to certain populations of chimpanzees and (2) rated the behavior as either customary – occurring in all individuals within that population; habitual – not present in all individuals, but repeated in several individuals; present – neither customary or habitual but clearly identified; absent – instance of behavior not recorded and has no ecological explanation; ecological – absence of behavior can be attributed to ecological features or lack thereof in the environment, or of unknown origin. Their results were extensive: of the 65 categories of behavior studied, 39 (including grooming, tool usage and courtship behaviors) were found to be habitual in some communities but nonexistent in others.

Whiten et al. further made sure that these local traditions were not due to differences in ecology, and defined cultural behaviors as behaviors that are "transmitted repeatedly through social or observational learning to become a population-level characteristic". Eight years later, after "conducting large-scale controlled social-diffusion experiments with captive groups", Whiten et al. stated further that "alternative foraging techniques seeded in different groups of chimpanzees spread differentially...across two further groups with substantial fidelity".

This finding confirms not only that nonhuman species can maintain unique cultural traditions; it also shows that they can pass these traditions on from one population to another. The Whiten articles are a tribute to the inventiveness of wild chimpanzees, and help prove that humans' impressive capacity for culture and cultural transmission dates back to the now-extinct common ancestor we share with chimpanzees.

Similar to humans, social structure plays an important role in cultural transmission in chimpanzees. Victoria Horner conducted an experiment where an older, higher ranking individual and a younger, lower ranking individual were both taught the same task with only slight aesthetic modification. She found that chimpanzees tended to imitate the behaviors of the older, higher ranking chimpanzee as opposed to the younger, lower ranking individual when given a choice. It is believed that the older higher ranking individual had gained a level of 'prestige' within the group. This research demonstrates that culturally transmitted behaviors are often learned from individuals that are respected by the group.

The older, higher ranking individual's success in similar situations in the past led the other individuals to believe that their fitness would be greater by imitating the actions of the successful individual. This shows that not only are chimpanzees imitating behaviors of other individuals, they are choosing which individuals they should imitate in order to increase their own fitness. This type of behavior is very common in human culture as well. People will seek to imitate the behaviors of an individual that has earned respect through their actions. From this information, it is evident that the cultural transmission system of chimpanzees is more complex than previous research would indicate.

Chimpanzees have been known to use tools for as long as they have been studied. Andrew Whiten found that chimpanzees not only use tools, but also conform to using the same method as the majority of individuals in the group. This conformity bias is prevalent in human culture as well and is commonly referred to as peer pressure.

The results from the research of Victoria Horner and Andrew Whiten show that chimpanzee social structures and human social structures have more similarities than previously thought.

== Cetacean culture ==
Second only to non-human primates, culture in species within the order Cetacea, which includes whales, dolphins, and porpoises, has been studied for numerous years. In these animals, much of the evidence for culture comes from vocalizations and feeding behaviors.

Cetacean vocalizations have been studied for many years, specifically those of the bottlenose dolphin, humpback whale, orca, and sperm whale. Since the early 1970s, scientists have studied these four species in depth, finding potential cultural attributes within group dialects, foraging, and migratory traditions. Hal Whitehead, a leading cetologist, and his colleagues conducted a study in 1992 of sperm whale groups in the South Pacific, finding that groups tended to be clustered based on their vocal dialects. The differences in the whales' songs among and between the various groups could not be explained genetically or ecologically, and thus was attributed to social learning. In mammals such as these sperm whales or bottlenose dolphins, the decision on whether an animal has the capacity for culture comes from more than simple behavioral observations. As described by ecologist Brooke Sergeant, "on the basis of life-history characteristics, social patterns, and ecological environments, bottlenose dolphins have been considered likely candidates for socially learned and cultural behaviors," due to being large-brained and capable of vocal and motor imitation.

In dolphins, scientists have focused mostly on foraging and vocal behaviors, though many worry about the fact that social functions for the behaviors have not yet been found. As with primates, many humans are reluctantly willing, yet ever so slightly willing, to accept the notion of cetacean culture, when well evidenced, due to their similarity to humans in having "long lifetimes, advanced cognitive abilities, and prolonged parental care."

=== Matrilineal whales ===
In the cases of three species of matrilineal cetaceans, pilot whales, sperm whales, and orcas (also known as killer whales), mitochondrial DNA nucleotide diversities are about ten times lower than other species of whale. Whitehead found that this low mtDNA nucleotide diversity yet high diversity in matrilineal whale culture may be attributed to cultural transmission, since learned cultural traits have the ability to have the same effect as normal maternally inherited mtDNA. The divergence of the sympatric resident and transient ecotypes of orcas off Vancouver Island is attributed to differences in diet. The resident ecotype feeds on fish and a little squid, and the transient ecotype feeds on marine mammals.

Vocalizations have also been proven to be culturally acquired in orca and sperm whale populations, as evidenced by the distinct vocalization patterns maintained by members of these different populations even in cases where more than one population may occupy one home range. Even within the same community clan, the three southern resident orca pods maintain unique, stable dialects separate from each other's, though they are associated and share some pulsed calls and whistles. The majority of their vocalizations are repetitions of the same calls, referred to as discrete or stereotyped calls, recorded since the 1960s and passed on by the orcas from generation to generation. A Southern Resident calf only learns the discrete calls used in the pod of their mother, though exposed to other calls in the clan.

Further study is being done in the matrilineal whales to uncover the cultural transmission mechanisms associated with other advanced techniques, such as migration strategies, new foraging techniques, and babysitting.

=== Dolphins ===
By using a "process of elimination" approach, researchers Krutzen et al. reported evidence of culturally transmitted tool use in bottlenose dolphins (Tursiops sp.). It has been previously noted that tool use in foraging, called "sponging" exists in this species. "Sponging" describes a behavior where a dolphin will break off a marine sponge, wear it over its rostrum, and use it to probe for fish. Using various genetic techniques, Krutzen et al. showed that the behavior of "sponging" is vertically transmitted from the mother, with most spongers being female. Additionally, they found high levels of genetic relatedness from spongers, suggesting recent ancestry and the existence of a phenomenon researchers call a "sponging eve".

In order to make a case for cultural transmission as the mode of behavioral inheritance in this case, Krutzen et al. needed to rule out possible genetic and ecological explanations. The Krutzen et al. refer to data that indicate both spongers and nonspongers use the same habitat for foraging. Using mitochondrial DNA data, Krutzen et al. found a significant non-random association between the types of mitochondrial DNA pattern and sponging. Because mitochondrial DNA is inherited maternally, this result suggests sponging is passed from the mother.

In a later study one more possible explanation for the transmission of sponging was ruled out in favor of cultural transmission. Scientists from the same lab looked at the possibility that 1.) the tendency for "sponging" was due to a genetic difference in diving ability and 2.) that these genes were under selection. From a test of 29 spongers and 54 nonspongers, the results showed that the coding mitochondrial genes were not a significant predictor of sponging behavior. Additionally, there was no evidence of selection in the investigated genes.

== Rat culture ==
Notable research has been done with black rats and Norwegian rats. Among studies of rat culture, the most widely discussed research is that performed by Joseph Terkel in 1991 on a species of black rats that he had originally observed in the wild in Palestine. Terkel conducted an in-depth study aimed to determine whether the observed behavior, the systematic stripping of pine cone scales from pine cones prior to eating, was a socially acquired behavior, as this action had not been observed elsewhere. The experimentation with and observation of these black rats was one of the first to integrate field observations with laboratory experiments to analyze the social learning involved. From the combination of these two types of research, Terkel was able to analyze the mechanisms involved in this social learning to determine that this eating behavior resulted from a combination of ecology and cultural transmission, as the rats could not figure out how to eat the pinecones without being "shown" by mature rats.

Though this research is fairly recent, it is often used as a prime example of evidence for culture in non-primate, non-cetacean beings. Animal migration may be in part cultural; released ungulates have to learn over generations the seasonal changes in local vegetation.

In the black rat (Rattus rattus), social transmission appears to be the mechanism of how optimal foraging techniques are transmitted. In this habitat, the rats' only source of food is pine seeds that they obtain from pine cones. Terkel et al. studied the way in which the rats obtained the seeds and the method that this strategy was transmitted to subsequent generations. Terkel et al. found that there was an optimal strategy for obtaining the seeds that minimized energy inputs and maximized outputs. Naïve rats that did not use this strategy could not learn it from trial and error or from watching experienced rats. Only young offspring could learn the technique. Additionally, from cross-fostering experiments where pups of naïve mothers were placed with experienced mothers and vice versa, those pups placed with experienced mothers learned the technique while those with naïve mothers did not. This result suggests that this optimal foraging technique is socially rather than genetically transmitted.

== Avian culture ==
External videos
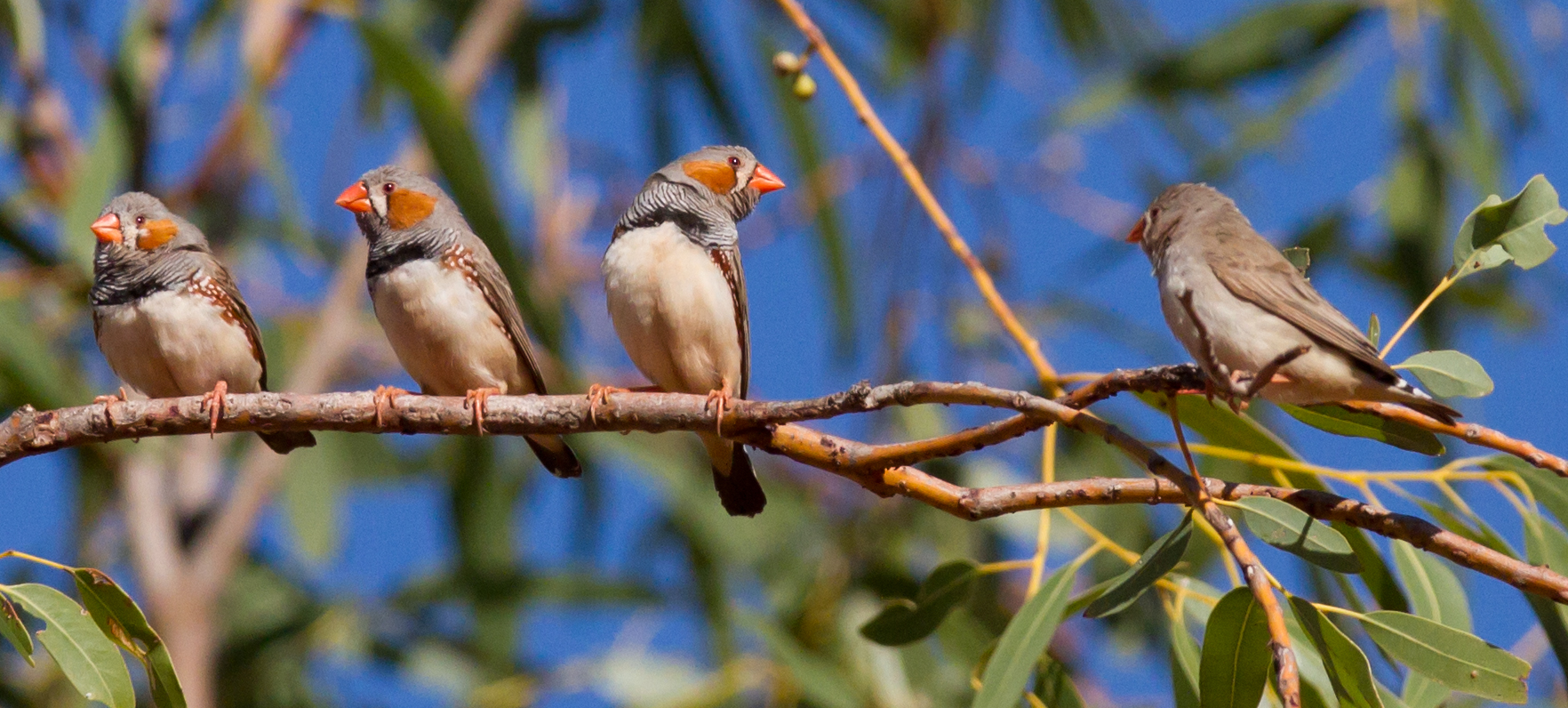
- "The cultural lives of birds", Knowable Magazine, February 26, 2022

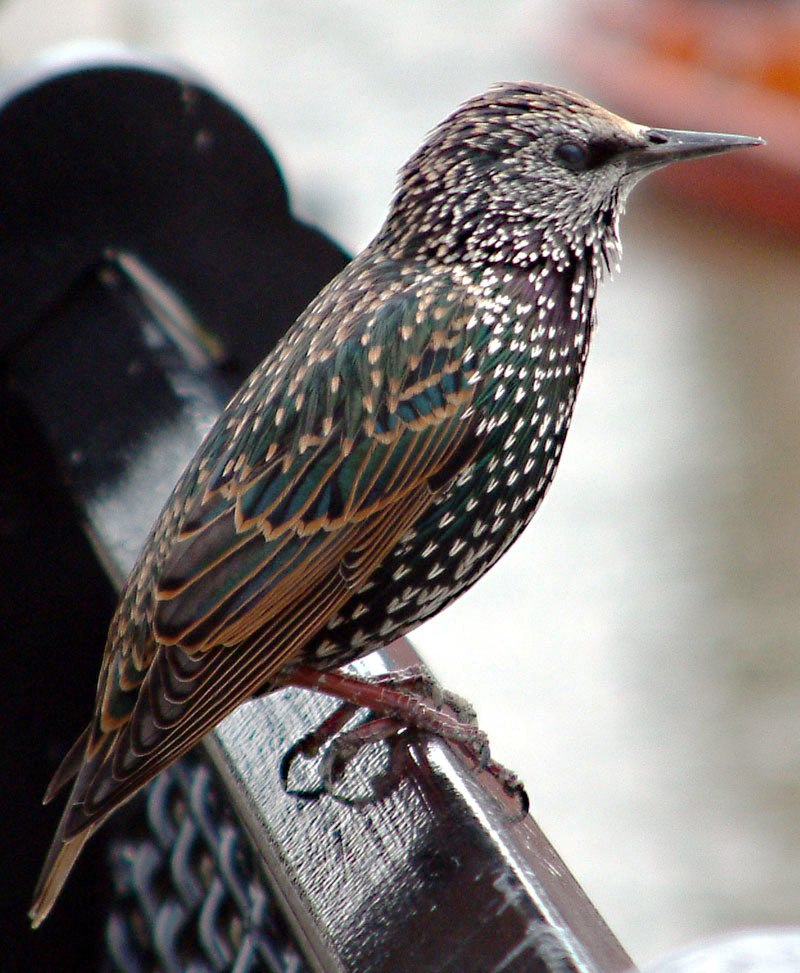
The songs of starlings have been discovered to show regional "dialects," a trait that has potential to have a cultural basis.

Common starling song

Birds have been a strong study subject on the topic of culture due to their observed vocal "dialects" similar to those studied in the cetaceans. These dialects were first discovered by zoologist Peter Marler, who noted the geographic variation in the songs of various songbirds. Many scientists have found that, in attempting to study these animals, they approach a stumbling block in that it is difficult to understand these animals' societies due to their being so different from our own.

Despite this hindrance, evidence for differing dialects among songbird populations has been discovered, especially in sparrows, starlings, and cowbirds. In these birds, scientists have found strong evidence for imitation-based learning, one of the main types of social learning. Though the songbirds obviously learn their songs through imitating other birds, many scientists remain skeptical about the correlation between this and culture: "...the ability to imitate sound may be as reflexive and cognitively uncomplicated as the ability to breathe. It is how imitation affects and is affected by context, by ongoing social behavior, that must be studied before assuming its explanatory power." The scientists have found that simple imitation does not itself lay the ground for culture, whether in humans or birds, but rather it is how this imitation affects the social life of an individual that matters.

=== Examples of culturally transmitted behaviors in birds ===
The complexity of several avian behaviors can be explained by the accumulation of cultural traits over many generations.

==== Bird song ====
In an experiment regarding at vocal behavior in birds, researchers Marler and Tamura found evidence of song dialects in white-crowned sparrows, which exhibit learned vocal behavior. Marler and Tamura found that while song variation existed between individual birds, each population of birds had a distinct song pattern that varied in accordance to geographical location. For this reason, Marler and Tamura called the patterns of each region a "dialect"; however, this term has since been disputed, as different types of in bird song are much less distinct than dialects in human language.

By raising white-crowned sparrows different acoustic settings and observing effects on their verbal behavior, Marler and Tamura found that the sparrows learned songs during the first 100 days of their lives. In this experimental setting, male birds in acoustic chambers were exposed to recorded sounds played through a loudspeaker. They also showed that white-crowned sparrows only learn songs recorded from other members of their species. Marler and Tamura noted that this case of cultural transmission was interesting because it required no social bond between the learner and the emitter of sound (since all sounds originated from a loudspeaker in their experiments).

However, the presence of social bonds strongly facilitates song imitation in certain songbirds. Zebra finches rarely imitate songs played from a loudspeaker, but they regularly imitate songs of an adult bird after only a few hours of interaction. Interestingly, imitation in zebra finches is inhibited when the number of siblings (pupils) increases.

==== Innovative foraging ====
In 20th century Britain, bottled milk was delivered to households in the early morning by milkmen and left on doorsteps to be collected. Birds such as tits (Paridae) began to attack the bottles, opening the foil or cardboard lids and drinking the cream of the top. It was later shown that this innovative behavior arose independently in several different sites and spread horizontally (i.e. between living members) in the existing population. Later experimental evidence showed that conformity may lead to the horizontal spread of innovative behaviors in wild birds, and that this may in turn result in a lasting cultural tradition.

A spread of new foraging behaviors also occurred in an Argentinian population of kelp gulls (Larus dominicanus). During the 20th century, individuals in this population began to non-fatally wound the backs of swimming whales with their beaks, feeding on the blubber and creating deeper lesions in areas that were already wounded. Aerial photographs showed that gull-induced lesions on local whales increased in frequency from 2% to 99% from 1974 to 2011, and that this behavior was not observed in any other kelp gull populations other than two isolated incidents.

External videos
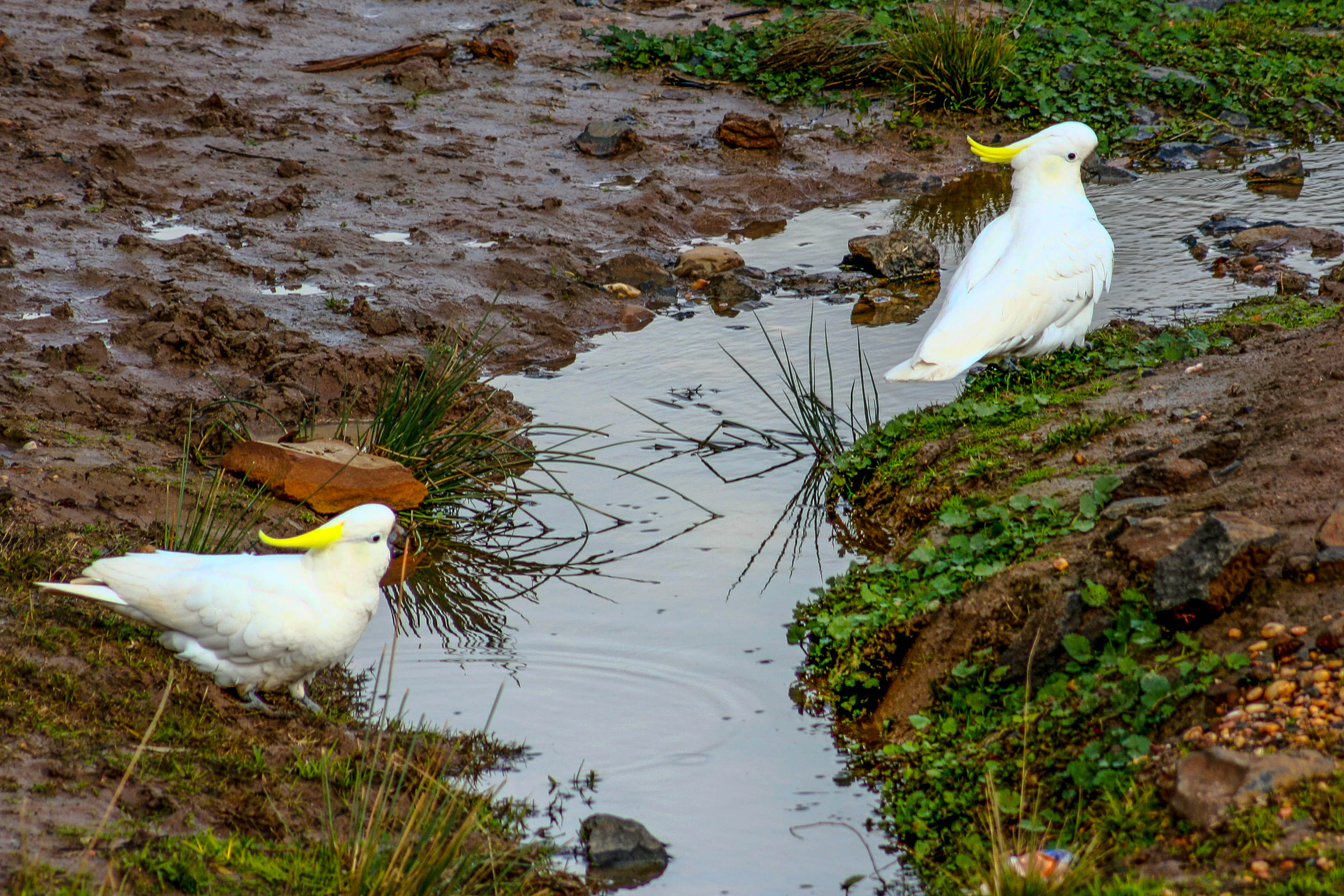
- "Cockatoos learn how to flip open garbage bins by copying each other", ABC News, July 22, 2021

In New South Wales, researchers and citizen scientists were able to track the spread of lid-flipping skills as cockatoos learned from each other to open garbage bins. Bin-opening spread more quickly to neighbouring suburbs than suburbs further away. In addition, birds in different areas developed their own variants for accomplishing the complex task.

==== Migration ====
Juvenile birds that migrate in flocks may learn to navigate accurately through cultural transmission of route choice skills from older birds. Cultural inheritance of migration patterns has been shown in bustards (Otis tarda), and the pattern of inheritance was shown to depend on social structures in the flock.

==== Nest construction ====
White-browed sparrow-weaver show cultural traditions in the construction of their communal nests. These nests vary in shape and size among different groups, even when living in close proximity. This variation is not influenced by genetic factors or environmental conditions, but rather reflects group-specific preferences that are passed down through generations.

==== Tool-making ====
New Caledonian crows have sophisticated tool-making skills, which are learned and transmitted within their local populations. These tools include sticks and leaves that are crafted into designs which vary by region and are passed down through generations. Regional variation and lack of ecological causes suggests these tool-making practices are the product of cultural transmission rather than being genetically inherited.

=== Avian social networks ===
Social networks are a specific mechanism of cultural transmission in birds. Information learned in social contexts can allow them to make decisions that lead to increased fitness. A great deal of research has focused on the communication of new foraging locations or behaviors through social networks. These networks are currently being analyzed through computational methods such as network-based diffusion analysis (NBDA).

In wild songbirds, social networks are a mechanism for information transmission both within and between species. Interspecific networks (i.e. networks including birds of different species) were shown to exist in multispecies flocks containing three different types of tits whose niches overlapped. In this study, knowledge about new feeding areas spread through social interactions: more birds visited the new area than the number of birds that discovered the area independently. The researchers noted that information likely travelled faster among members of the same species (conspecifics), but that individuals did not depend solely on conspecifics for transmission. Another study on army-ant-following birds has also evidenced interspecific transmission of foraging information.

A 2016 study used RFID identification transponders to experimentally manipulate avian social networks: this scanner technology allowed them to restrict access to feeders for some birds and not others. Their data showed that individuals are more likely to learn from those who were able to enter the same feeding area as them. Additionally, the existing "paths" of information transmission were altered following segregation during feeding: this was attributed to changes in the population's social network.

Others have been able to predict the pattern information transmission among individuals based on a preexisting social network. In this study, social interactions of ravens (Corvus corax) were first analyzed to create a comprehensive network. Then, the order in which individuals learned task-solving behavior from a trained tutor was compared with the network. They not only found that the pattern of learning reflected the network that they had built, but that different types of social connections (such as "affiliative interactions" and "aggressive interactions") characterized different rates of information transmission and observation.

=== Conformity in avian culture ===
Bartlett and Slater observed call convergence (i.e. conformity) in budgerigars introduced into groups with different flock-specific calls than their own. They also found that the original calls of flock members did not change significantly during this process.

Conformity is one mechanism through which innovative behaviors can become embedded in culture. In an experimental setting, tits preferentially adopted the locally popular method of opening a two-action puzzle box even after discovering the other possible way of accessing the food. This formed diverging local traditions when different populations were seeded with birds specifically trained in one method.

Other research showed that although conformity has a strong influence on behaviors adopted by birds, the local tradition can be abandoned in favor of an analogous behavior which gives higher reward. This showed that while conformity is a beneficial mechanism for quickly establishing traditions, unhelpful traditions will not necessarily be adhered to in the presence of a better alternative.

In some cases, conformity-based aggression may benefit individuals who conform to traditions. Researchers used the framework of sexual selection and conformism in of song types of songbirds to model territorial aggression against individuals with non-conforming song types. Their model showed that aggressors won more frequently when targeting non-conformers (than in un-targeted or random aggression). They also found that alleles for conformity-enforcement propagated more effectively than alleles for tolerance of non-conformity.

Finally, other species of birds have been observed to conform to the personality of other individuals in their presence. Gouldian finches (Erythrura gouldiae) exist in red- and black-headed subtypes, and these subtypes have been shown to have different levels of boldness (measured by the time taken to explore new areas, and other similar tests). Experiments placing black-headed birds (known to be less bold) in the company of red-headed birds (known to be more bold) resulted in the black-headed bird performing "bolder" behaviors, and red-headed birds became "shyer" in the presence of black-headed ones. The experimenters hypothesized that this individual-level conformity could lead to stronger social cohesion.

== Fish culture ==
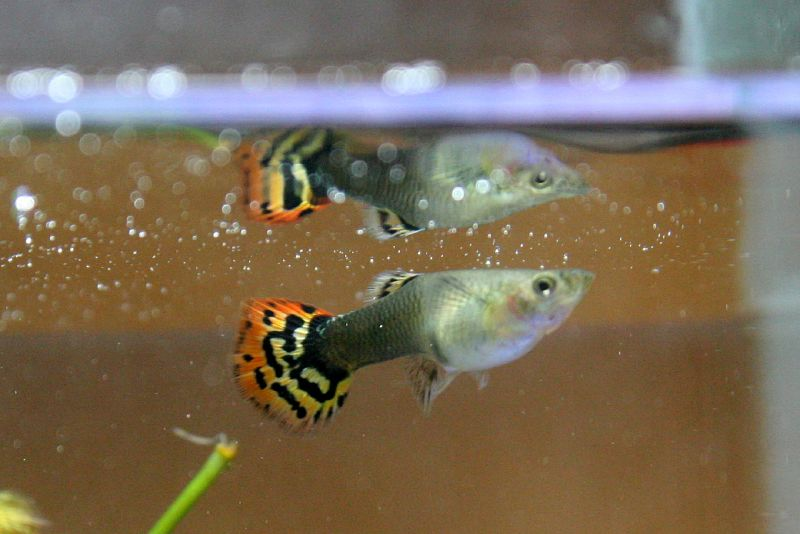
Guppy mating behavior is believed to be culturally influenced.

Evidence for cultural transmission has also been shown in wild fish populations. Scientists Helfman and Schultz conducted translocation experiments with French grunts (Haemulon flavolineatum) where they took fish native to a specific schooling site and transported them to other sites. In this species of fish, the organism uses distinct, traditional migration routes to travel to schooling sites on coral reefs. These routes persisted past one generation and so by relocating the fish to different sites, Helfman and Schultz wanted to see if the new fish could relearn that sites' migration route from the resident fish. Indeed this is what they found: that the newcomers quickly learned the traditional routes and schooling sites. But when residents were removed under similar situations, the new fish did not use the traditional route and instead use new routes, suggesting that the behavior could not be transmitted once the opportunity for learning was no longer there.

In a similar experiment looking at mating sites in blueheaded wrasse (Thalassoma bifasciatum), researcher Warner found that individuals chose mating sites based on social traditions and not based on the resource quality of the site. Warner found that although mating sites were maintained for four generations, when entire local populations were translocated elsewhere, new sites were used and maintained.

== Controversies and criticisms ==
A popular method of approaching the study of animal culture (and its transmission) is the "ethnographic method," which argues that culture causes the geographical differences in the behavioral repertoires of large-brained mammals. Some researchers argue this downplays the roles that ecology and genetics play in influencing behavioral variation from population to population within a species.

Culture is just one source of adaptive behavior an organism exhibits to better exploit its environment. When behavioral variation reflects differential phenotypic plasticity, it is due more to ecological pressures than cultural ones. In other words, when an animal changes its behavior over its lifespan, this is most often a result of changes in its environment. Furthermore, animal behavior is also influenced by evolved predispositions, or genetics. It is very possible that "correlation between distance between sites and 'cultural difference' might reflect the well-established correlation between genetic and geographical distances". The farther two populations of a species are separated from each other, the less genetic traits they will share in common, and this may be one source of variance in culture.

Another argument against the "ethnographic method" is that it is impossible to prove that there are absolutely no ecological or genetic factors in any behavior. However, this criticism can also be applied to studies of human culture. Though culture has long been thought to arise and remain independent of genetics, the constraints on the propagation and innovation of cultural techniques inevitably caused by the genome of each respective animal species has led to the theory of gene-culture coevolution, which asserts that "cognitive, affective, and moral capacities" are the product of an evolutionary dynamic involving interactions between genes and culture over extended periods of time. The concept behind gene-culture coevolution is that, though culture plays a huge role in the progression of animal behavior over time, the genes of a particular species have the ability to affect the details of the corresponding culture and its ability to evolve within that species.

Culture can also contribute to differences in behavior, but like genes and environments, it carries different weight in different behaviors. As Laland and Janik explain, "to identify cultural variation, not only is it not sufficient to rule out the possibility that the variation in behavior constitutes unlearned responses to different selection pressures [from the environment], but it is also necessary to consider the possibility of genetic variation precipitating different patterns of learning." Gene-culture coevolution, much like the interaction between cultural transmission and environment, both serve as modifiers to the original theories on cultural transmission and evolution that focused more on differences in the interactions between individuals.

== Unanswered questions and future areas of exploration ==
In the study of social transmissions, one of the important unanswered questions is an explanation of how and why maladaptive social traditions are maintained. For example, in one study on social transmission in guppies (Poecilia reticulata), naïve fish preferred taking a long, energetically costly route to a feeder that they had learned from resident fish rather than take a shorter route. These fish were also slower to learn the new, quicker route compared to naïve fish that had not been trained in the long route. In this case, not only is the social tradition maladaptive, but it also inhibits the acquisition of adaptive behavior.

== See also ==
- Animal cognition
- Animal communication
- Animal language
- Animal consciousness
- Animal-made art
- Animal training
- Anthropology
- Culture
- Culture theory
- Cultural transmission
- Social learning in animals
- Sociobiology
