= Disciple discography =

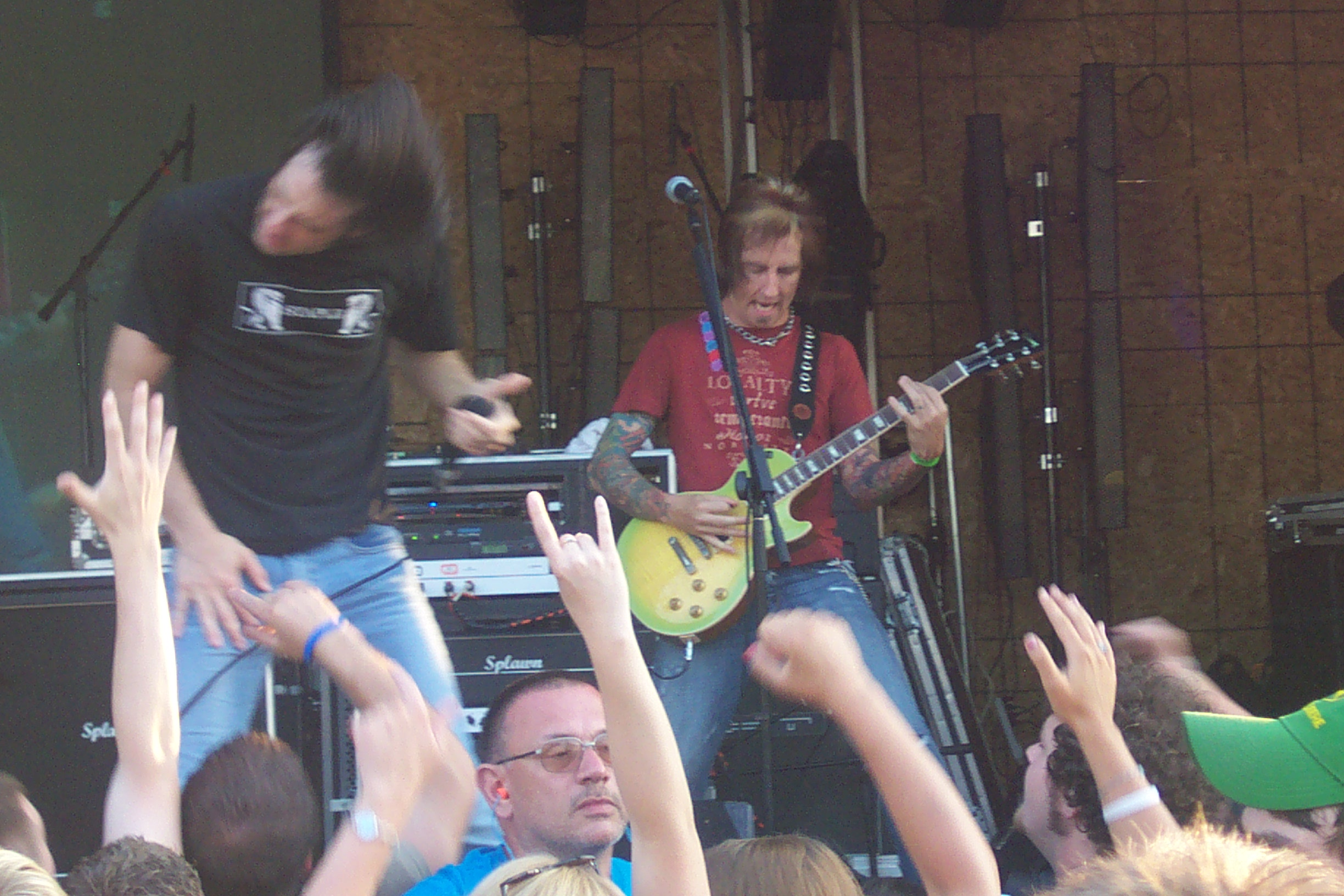
- Disciple performing in 2006
- Studio albums: 14
- Extended plays: 4
- Music videos: 9

The discography of Disciple, an American Christian rock/metal band, consists of 14 studio albums, three extended plays, one live extended play, one compilation album, and nine music videos.

== Studio albums ==
| Year | Album details | Peak chart positions | | | | Certifications and sales |
| Year | Album details | US | US Rock | US Christ. | US Heat. | Certifications and sales |
|---|---|---|---|---|---|---|
| 1993 | "Trail of Tears": Released: 1993; Label: Independent | — | — | — | — | |
| 1994 | "Lake of Fire": Released: 1994; Label: Independent | — | — | — | — | |
| 1995 | What Was I Thinking: Released: 1995; Label: Independent | — | — | — | — | |
| 1999 | This Might Sting a Little: Released: 1999; Label: Rugged | — | — | — | — | |
| 2001 | By God: Released: February 6, 2001; Label: Rugged | — | — | — | — | |
| 2003 | Back Again: Released: 2003; Label: Independent | — | — | — | — | |
| 2005 | Disciple: Released: June 7, 2005; Label: SRE | — | — | 9 | 8 | |
| 2006 | Scars Remain: Released: November 7, 2006; Label: SRE | 118 | — | 9 | 1 | |
| 2008 | Southern Hospitality: Released: October 21, 2008; Label: INO | 98 | — (Note: Southern Hospitality did not enter the Billboard Top Rock Albums chart, but peaked at No. 22 on the Billboard Hard Rock Albums chart.) | 5 | — | |
| 2010 | Horseshoes & Handgrenades: Released: September 14, 2010; Label: INO/Columbia | 50 | 19 | 1 | — | |
| 2012 | O God Save Us All: Released: November 13, 2012; Label: Fair Trade | 98 | 32 | 5 | — | |
| 2014 | Attack: Released: September 23, 2014; Label: Independent | 44 | 13 | 2 | — | |
| 2016 | Long Live the Rebels: Released: October 14, 2016; Label: BEC/Tooth & Nail | 125 | 16 | 6 | — | |
| 2019 | Love Letter Kill Shot: Released: September 13, 2019; Label: Tooth & Nail | — (Note: Love Letter Kill Shot did not enter the Billboard 200, but peaked at No. 40 on the Billboard Top Album Sales chart.) | — (Note: Love Letter Kill Shot did not enter the Billboard Top Rock Albums chart, but peaked at No. 17 on the Billboard Rock Album Sales chart.) | 5 | — | |
| 2023 | Skeleton Psalms: Released: April 28, 2023; Label: BEC | — | — | — | — | |

== EPs ==
| Year | Album details | Peak chart positions | Certifications and sales |
| Year | Album details | US Christ. | Certifications and sales |
|---|---|---|---|
| 1997 | My Daddy Can Whip Your Daddy: Released: 1997; Label: Warner Resound | — | |
| 2006 | Things Left Unsaid: Released: 2006; Four tracks that were later released on the 2006 Limited Edition of Disciple | — | |
| 2015 | Vultures: Released: September 25, 2015; Label: Independent | 49 | |
| 2016 | Live In Denmark: Released: July 21, 2016; Label: Independent | — | |

== Singles ==
- "3-2-1", 2008 (from Southern Hospitality)
- "Whatever Reason", 2008 (from Southern Hospitality)
- "Romance Me", 2009 (from Southern Hospitality)
- "Right There", 2009 (from Southern Hospitality)
- "Lay My Burdens", 2009 (from Southern Hospitality)
- "Dear X (You Don't Own Me)", 2010 (from Horseshoes & Handgrenades)
- "Draw the Line", 2012 (from O God Save Us All)
- "Radical", 2014 (from Attack)
- "Erase", 2016 (from Long Live the Rebels)
- "God Is With Us", 2016 (from Long Live the Rebels)
- "Cuff the Criminal", 2019 (from Love Letter Kill Shot)
- "Panic Room (featuring Andrew Schwab)", 2019 (from Love Letter Kill Shot)
- "Play to Win", 2019 (from Love Letter Kill Shot)
- "Reanimate", 2019 (from Love Letter Kill Shot)
- "Darkness Dies," 2020 (from Love Letter Kill Shot (Deluxe))
- "The Executioner", 2023 (from Skeleton Psalms)
- "Promise to Live", 2023 (from Skeleton Psalms)
- "Bad Words", 2023 (from Skeleton Psalms)
- "Firm Foundation (He Won't)", 2024 (single; also credited to Honor & Glory)
- "If You Say So", 2024 (TBD)
- "Sound The Alarm", 2025 (TBD)

== Special edition ==
- Scars Remain: Special Edition
- Best of Disciple, 2005–2013
- Love Letter Kill Shot (Deluxe)

== Music videos ==
| Year | Title | Album | Source |
|---|---|---|---|
| 1999 | I Just Know | This Might Sting a Little | YouTube Go |
| 2001 | Not Rock Stars | By God | YouTube Go |
| 2003 | Back Again | Back Again | YouTube Go |
| 2003 | One More Time | Back Again | YouTube Go |
| 2005 | The Wait Is Over | Disciple | YouTube Go |
| 2007 | Scars Remain | Scars Remain | YouTube Go |
| 2007 | After the World | Scars Remain | YouTube Go |
| 2009 | Lay My Burdens | Southern Hospitality | YouTube Go |
| 2012 | O God Save Us All | O God Save Us All | YouTube Go |
| 2014 | Radical | Attack | YouTube Go |
| 2016 | Long Live the Rebels | Long Live the Rebels | YouTube Go |
| 2023 | The Executioner | Skeleton Psalms | YouTube Go |

=== Videography ===
- Live, at Home, and on the Road, 2004
- 72 Hours with Disciple, 2001
- Dual Disc: "Day in the Life"
- LIVE 2012: 4 Nights In California 2012 (Download)

== Compilation appearances ==
- WWE The Music, Vol. 8, 2008 "In The Middle Of It Now"
- X 2006, 2006 "The Wait is Over" (from Disciple)
- ConGRADulations! Class of 2006, 2006..."The Wait Is Over" (from Disciple)
- Isaiah 53:5: A Tribute to Stryper, 1999 "More than a Man" (from To Hell with the Devil by Stryper) 1340 Records
- J. P. Losman "The Wait Is Over" first start with the Buffalo Bills – NFL Videos
