= Jason Wilkes =

American singer-songwriter (born 1984)

WILKES
- Born: Jason Scott Wilkes; September 12, 1984 (age 42); Cedartown, Georgia, U.S.
- Genre: Singer-songwriter
- Occupations: Musician; singer; songwriter
- Instruments: Vocals; guitars; drums; keyboards; bass guitars
- Years active: 2001–present
- Labels: Word Records; Warner Music Group; RKT; Selectric Records
- Formerly of: High Flight Society, Disciple
- Website: wilkesmusic.com

Jason Scott Wilkes (born September 12, 1984), known professionally as WILKES, is a musician, singer and songwriter. He is the former frontman for High Flight Society and is now a solo artist.

== Early life and education ==
Wilkes was born in Cedartown, Georgia, United States, and lived there until he married. He attended Cedar Hill Middle School. He gave an audition during the school's talent show on April 1, 1999. He attended the University of West Georgia, and studied Auto Body & Paint at Coosa Valley Technical College.

== Bands ==
=== High Flight Society (2001–2012) ===
After around two years of recording demos and performing local gigs, High Flight Society began searching for a frontman. John Packer, the bassist and backing vocalist of High Flight Society, happened to be Wilkes' friend. The trio chose Wilkes to be their frontman in 2001. The band was then renamed to High Flight Society.

The band was originally on Selectric Records for the release of their EP From Far Above Somewhere. They were then signed onto RKT Music, a subsidiary of Rocketown Records, in March 2007. On June 5, 2007, the band released its self-titled debut album under RKT Music.

In late 2008, the label folded, leaving High Flight Society without a label. On December 12, 2008, it was announced that they had added Jerad Griffin to take over Jason's rhythm guitar parts and to sing background vocals. In 2009, High Flight Society independently recorded and funded the release of Par Avion, which was released on June 16. This EP was made available online, and hard copies were sold only at shows.

On March 12, 2010, it was announced that they had officially signed to Warner Brothers/Word Records. Unfortunately, due to restructuring within the label, they were abruptly dropped, leaving them wondering how they would proceed as a band.

On December 21, 2010, it was announced that they had decided to part ways with Jerad. Using Kickstarter, the band raised over $5000 between December 21, 2010, and January 28, 2011, to fund their new six-song EP. On December 20, 2011, the band released its final work, Lights Come Down.

On Sunday, May 20, 2012, Lockridge, aged 31, had a seizure while preparing for church and died of apparent trauma. After that, the remaining members decided to disband.

=== Sam Hunt (2010–2012) ===
Wilkes and the rest of High Flight Society backed Sam Hunt as his band for a couple of years. They unofficially called themselves "Sam Hunt and The Second Chance Band." Wilkes played acoustic guitar, rhythm electric guitar, and sang background vocals for Sam.

=== Disciple (2012–2015) ===
During late 2012, Disciple underwent a lineup change, causing all members to be replaced, with the exception of Kevin Young, the band's lead vocalist and one of the founding members. Wilkes joined the band as bassist, backing vocalist and co-lead vocalist. Disciple did a co-headlining tour with Fireflight in January and February 2013, called the Save Us Now Tour.

In early 2014, Disciple launched a Kickstarter campaign to fund their new album, which was to be recorded and released independently. The campaign was a huge success, setting a goal of $45,000 and ending with a total pledged amount of $115,852. For this project, the band returned to producer Travis Wyrick, who produced the first seven Disciple albums. The album, titled Attack, was released on September 23 worldwide. This was the band's first release to feature the members of the new lineup, including Wilkes. Apart from playing the bass and singing background and co-lead vocals, Wilkes helped in co-writing three tracks on the album. The band went on to tour alongside Decyfer Down, Nine Lashes and Seventh Day Slumber on the City Rockfest tour of 2015.

On March 31, 2015, it was announced that Wilkes had made the decision to step down from the band in order to support his family. He left the band after the last show of the City Rockfest tour, on April 11, 2015.

On September 25, 2015, the band released Vultures, an EP which consisted of songs that were written while recording Attack, but not released along with the rest of the songs on the album. While Wilkes did not record anything on the EP, he did co-write three of its songs.

=== Wilkes (2015–present) ===
After parting ways with Disciple, Wilkes started a solo venture, with the help of a few other musicians including Georgia musician Shane Cole. On August 6, 2016, Wilkes started a fundraiser for the creation of two new acoustic EPs. Wilkes stated on the campaign page that the EPs will be free.

On March 14, 2017, Wilkes released the first EP on his official website, and called it "No Filter - Part I". The EP consists of 3 tracks.

On July 22, 2017, Wilkes released a full production single instead of a second acoustic EP. The single is called "Stealing from Heaven".

== The Voice ==
On March 6, 2018, Jason Wilkes appeared on NBC's The Voice, as a blind audition contestant. The episode in which he appeared was the fourth episode of season 14. He performed "One Headlight" by The Wallflowers, and caused two out of four coaches to turn around; Adam Levine and Blake Shelton. Upon being given the choice, he joined Team Blake. In the Battles Round, on the episode broadcast on March 26, 2018, he was paired with Blake Team teammate Jordan Kirkdorffer both singing "Nobody to Blame", a Chris Stapleton song. He was picked by Blake to move on to the knockouts round. Wilkes then sang "The Climb" by Miley Cyrus, winning his knockout against Dylan Hartigan, moved on to the live playoffs and was eliminated.

== Discography ==
=== Albums ===
| Band | Album | Year |
|---|---|---|
| High Flight Society | High Flight Society | 2007 |
| Disciple | Attack | 2014 |
| WILKES | Call It Whatever | 2023 |

=== EPs ===
| Band/group | EP (extended play) | Year |
|---|---|---|
| High Flight Society | From Far Above Somewhere | 2006 |
| High Flight Society | Par Avion | 2009 |
| High Flight Society | Lights Come Down | 2011 |
| Disciple | Vultures (co-writing) | 2015 |
| WILKES | Shells | 2015 |
| WILKES | No Filter - Part 1 | 2017 |

=== Singles ===
| Band/group | Single | Album/EP | Year |
|---|---|---|---|
| High Flight Society | "Up Above" | High Flight Society | 2007 |
| High Flight Society | "Time Is Running Out" | High Flight Society | 2007 |
| High Flight Society | "Declaration" | High Flight Society | 2007 |
| High Flight Society | "Sweet Redeemer" | High Flight Society | 2007 |
| High Flight Society | "Run from Yesterday" | Par Avion | 2009 |
| High Flight Society | "Inhaling a Bullet" | Par Avion | 2010 |
| Disciple | "Radical" | Attack | 2014 |
| WILKES | "O Come Emmanuel" | — | 2012 |
| WILKES | Stealing from Heaven | — | 2017 |

=== Compilation appearances ===
| Compilation | Contribution | Label | Year |
|---|---|---|---|
| Born After Vinyl, Vol. 1 | "Sweet Redeemer" | Rocketown | 2007 |
| Songs We've Been Trying To Tell You About (And Others We Haven't), Volume One | "Direction" | What Will People Think? | 2012 |
