= Live in Denmark (Disciple EP) =

EP by Disciple
- Released: July 21, 2016
- Genre: Christian rock
- Length: 15:53
- Label: Independent

Disciple chronology
Vultures (2015)	Live in Denmark (2016)	Long Live the Rebels (2016)

Professional ratings
Review scores
Source	Rating
Jesus Freak Hideout	3/5 stars

Live in Denmark is a live EP released by Christian Rock band, Disciple. It showcases several highlights from Disciple's performance on May 13, 2016, at Denmark's annual RiverFest event.

== Videos ==
Disciple released 12 videos of the very same performance on their YouTube channel on May 16–17. The songs they performed in those videos are listed below:

- 321 (Southern Hospitality)
- Angels & Demons (Attack)
- Dead Militia (Attack)
- Dear X, You Don't Own Me (Horseshoes & Handgrenades)
- Invisible (Horseshoes & Handgrenades)
- Lay My Burdens (Southern Hospitality)
- Radical (Attack)
- Regime Change (Scars Remain)
- Game On (Scars Remain)
- Sayonara (Vultures)
- Scars Remain (Scars Remain)
- Yesterday Is Over (Attack)

== Track listing ==
No.	Title	Length
1.	"321" (Southern Hospitality)	2:59
2.	"Regime Change" (Scars Remain)	4:17
3.	"Radical" (Attack)	4:03
4.	"Game On" (Scars Remain)	4:33
Total length:		15:53

== Personnel ==
- Kevin Young – lead vocals
- Josiah Prince – rhythm guitar, backing vocals
- Andrew Stanton – lead guitar, backing vocals
- Joey West – drums
