= Love Letter Kill Shot =

Studio album by Disciple
- Released: September 13, 2019
- Genre: Christian rock, hard rock, alternative metal
- Label: Tooth & Nail
- Producer: Travis Wyrick

Disciple chronology
Long Live the Rebels (2016)	Love Letter Kill Shot (2019)	Skeleton Psalms (2023)

Singles from Love Letter Kill Shot
- 1. "Cuff the Criminal" Released: July 19, 2019; 2. "Panic Room" Released: August 9, 2019; 3. "Reanimate" Released: August 30, 2019; 4. "Play to Win" Released: August 30, 2019

Love Letter Kill Shot is the twelfth studio album by Christian rock group Disciple. It is the seventh album by the band to be produced by Travis Wyrick, and was mixed and mastered by Zeuss (Demon Hunter, War of Ages, Iced Earth, Queensrÿche). The album was released on September 13, 2019. "Love Letter Kill Shot is nothing like our past albums," vocalist Kevin Young told New Release Today in an interview about the album, "It's nothing like Attack or Long Live the Rebels or Vultures or O God Save Us All or Horseshoes & Handgrenades. It's so different. The music is different. The lyrics are different. The way that we're saying things are different. But, the vision is the same. I guess we were able to tap into creativity and freshness that we've never been able to tap into before. It's very, very exciting for us."

== Critical reception ==
Professional ratings
Review scores
Source	Rating
Jesus Freak Hideout	4/5 stars
Today's Christian Entertainment	4/5 stars
Cross Rhythms	8/10 stars

The album received strong to positive ratings. Jesus Freak Hideout gave a 4 out of 5, saying, "Disciple has always had musical cohesion within a single album. Love Letter Kill Shot has that musical cohesion, and might be their most thematically cohesive album to date." Cross Rhythms gave an 8 out of 10, saying, "When a band has been around for as long as they have, it can be very easy to get stuck in a rut churning out carbon copy albums or resting on the success of the past but that is not the case with Disciple. They have evolved their sound to keep it sounding as fresh as ever." Today's Christian Entertainment said in their 4-star review, "Love Letter Kill Shot delivers beloved metal and hard rock melodies that Disciple is known for, along with open, honest, thought-provoking lyrics that challenge listeners to take a look at their life and their faith. With the popularity of the few singles released already, I believe Disciple fans will not be disappointed with the album in its entirety."

== Track listing ==
All tracks are written by Disciple.

No.	Title	Length
1.	"Cuff the Criminal"	3:32
2.	"Reanimate"	3:40
3.	"Wake Up"	3:32
4.	"Panic Room" (feat. Andrew Schwab of Project 86)	4:30
5.	"Play to Win"	3:27
6.	"Fire Away"	4:00
7.	"Misery"	3:44
8.	"Chemical Wisdom"	4:55
9.	"Never Too Late"	4:03
10.	"Touch of Pain"	3:31
11.	"Walk with Me"	3:23
12.	"Best Thing Ever"	4:17
Total length:		46:25

Deluxe edition
No.	Title	Length
13.	"Darkness Dies"	3:47
14.	"Enemy"	4:22
15.	"Kingdom Come"	4:03
Total length:		58:36

== Personnel ==
Disciple

- Kevin Young – lead vocals
- Josiah Prince – rhythm guitar, bass, backing vocals, production
- Andrew Stanton – lead guitar
- Joey West – drums, backing vocals

Additional personnel

- Zeuss – mixing and mastering
- Travis Wyrick – production
- Dane Allen – backing vocals on "Fire Away"
- Andrew Schwab (Project 86) – guest vocals on "Panic Room"
