= Write This Down =

Write This Down may refer to:

- Write This Down (band), an American Christian rock band from Minneapolis, Minnesota
  - Write This Down (album), the debut album by the aforementioned band
  - "Write This Down" (EP), an extended play by the aforementioned band
- "Write This Down" (song), a single by American country-music singer George Strait
