= Escape (Nine Lashes album) =

Studio album by Nine Lashes
- Released: June 5, 2009
- Genre: rock, alternative metal, heavy metal, nu metal
- Length: 43:15
- Label: Collide
- Producer: Travis Wyrick

Nine Lashes chronology
| Escape (2009) | World We View (2012) |

Escape is the debut studio album by the American rock band Nine Lashes, released on June 5, 2009. Recorded before the group signed to Tooth & Nail Records, the album was released through the independent record label Collide Records and produced by Travis Wyrick, and has a slightly darker sound than their second album and Tooth & Nail debut, World We View. While the album itself failed to chart, the songs "Words of Red" and "Word of Advice" made Billboard's rock chart.

== Recording and production ==
The album was recorded with producer Travis Wyrick. Lead vocalist Jeremy Dunn later said that Wyrick's personality and working atmosphere was the main difference from what the band would later experience working with Aaron Sprinkle on World We View, saying that Wyrick was "much more high strung. You'll get there at 8 am and he's already been up for 3 hours playing racquetball. He'll be like, 'Are you guys sleeping in today?', and it's only 8 in the morning. He's pretty intense." Meanwhile, Sprinkle was "more relaxed. He's just, 'Let's work in our own time. Let's not push things. Let's just let it happen.' So it was just a very different dynamic."

Musically, the album has a slightly darker and less enhanced sound than World We View. Influences cited by the band at the time included Chevelle, Breaking Benjamin, Kutless, Decyfer Down, Disciple, and 12 Stones.

== Release ==
The album was released on June 5, 2009 through the independent label Collide Records. While the album itself did not chart, the singles "Words of Red" and "Word of Advice" made Billboard/R&R's Christian Rock singles chart, peaking at No. 15 and No. 25, respectively.

== Track listing ==
1. "One and All" – 3:47
2. "Fly" – 3:16
3. "Escape" – 3:45
4. "Afterglow" – 4:35
5. "Words of Red" – 3:54
6. "Double or Nothing" – 3:33
7. "Hollow Theory" – 4:19
8. "Word of Advice" – 3:42
9. "Solace" (instrumental) – 0:46
10. "Cancer" – 4:07
11. "The Fall" – 3:48
12. "Goodbye" – 3:43

Notes

- "Afterglow" would later be re-recorded in a slightly altered form for World We View.

== Personnel ==
Nine Lashes

- Jeremy Dunn – vocals
- Adam Jefferson – guitar
- Jon Jefferson – guitar
- Jared Lankford – bass
- Noah Terrell – drums

Additional personnel

- Travis Wyrick – producer
