= Dear X =

Dear X may refer to:

- Dear X (TV series), a 2025 South Korean series
- "Dear X (You Don't Own Me)", a 2010 song by Disciple
