= Southern hospitality (disambiguation) =

Southern hospitality is a phrase used in American English to describe a positive stereotype of residents of the Southern United States.

Southern hospitality may also refer to:

- "Southern Hospitality" (song), a song by Ludacris
- Southern Hospitality (album), a 2008 album by Disciple, or the title song
- Southern Hospitality/Jeri Gently Jumps, a 2008 re-release of two 1950s albums by Jeri Southern
- Southern Hospitality (TV series), a 2022 American reality television series
