= My Daddy Can Whip Your Daddy =

EP by Disciple
- Released: October 27, 1997
- Studio: Lakeside Studios
- Genres: Christian metal, alternative metal
- Length: 18:09
- Label: Warner Resound
- Producers: Travis Wyrick, Jeff Lysyczyn, Barry Landis

Disciple chronology
What Was I Thinking (1995)	My Daddy Can Whip Your Daddy (1997)	This Might Sting a Little (1999)

Professional ratings
Review scores
Source	Rating
AllMusic	2.5/5 stars
Cross Rhythms	9/10 squares
Jesus Freak Hideout	2.5/5 stars

My Daddy Can Whip Your Daddy is an EP released by the Christian metal band Disciple in 1997. There is an alternative cover released.

== Track listing ==
1. "My Daddy Can Whip Your Daddy" – 3:16
2. "Pharisee" – 3:44
3. "Fill My Shoes" – 4:34
4. "Fall On Me" – 3:12
5. "Easter Bunny" – 3:23

== Personnel ==
Based on AllMusic credits:

- Kevin Young – vocals, bass
- Brad Noah – guitar
- Tim Barrett – drums
- Travis Wyrick – engineer, mixing, producer
- Jeff Lysyczyn – producer
- Barry Landis – executive producer
- Ken Love – mastering
- Karen Cronin – design
