= After the World =

Single by Disciple

from the album Scars Remain
- Released: November 7, 2006
- Recorded: 2006
- Genre: Alternative rock
- Length: 3:36
- Label: Epic
- Songwriters: Tim Barrett, Joey Fife, Brad Noah, Travis Wyrick and Kevin Young
- Producer: Travis Wyrick

Disciple singles chronology
"Scars Remain" (2007)	"After the World" (2006)	"Lay My Burdens" (2009)

Music video
- "After The World" on YouTube

"After the World" is a song by Christian hard rock band Disciple from their 2006 album Scars Remain. It was released as a radio single in 2007, and became the year's 8th most played song on Christian contemporary hit radio. The song peaked at No. 18, their highest peaking single on the Hot Christian Songs chart. It lasted 20 weeks on the overall chart. The song is played in a D major key at 76 beats per minute.

The song was nominated for the "Rock/Contemporary Recorded Song of the Year" award at the 2008 Dove Awards.

== Music video ==
The music video for the single "After The World" was released on March 17, 2011.

== Charts ==
=== Weekly charts ===
Chart (2007)	Peak position
US Christian AC (Billboard)	25
US Christian Airplay (Billboard)	18
US Christian Rock (Billboard)	6
US Hot Christian Songs (Billboard)	18

=== Year-end charts ===
Chart (2007)	Position
US Christian Songs (Billboard)	40

== Awards ==
In 2008, the song was nominated for a Dove Award for Rock/Contemporary Recorded Song of the Year at the 39th GMA Dove Awards.
