= Crawl Away =

Crawl Away may refer to:

== Entertainment ==
- "Crawl Away", a song by progressive metal band Tool from their 1993 album Undertow
- "Crawl Away", a song by Disciple from their 1995 album What Was I Thinking
