= World We View =

Studio album by Nine Lashes
- Released: February 14, 2012
- Recorded: 2011
- Genre: Christian metal, nu metal, alternative metal, post-grunge
- Length: 38:40
- Label: Tooth & Nail
- Producer: Aaron Sprinkle, Trevor McNevan

Nine Lashes chronology
Escape (2009)	World We View (2012)	From Water to War (2014)

Singles from World We View
- 1. "Anthem of the Lonely" Released: July 12, 2011; 2. "Get Back" Released: January 11, 2012; 3. "Adrenaline" Released: February 7, 2012 (Promotional Single); 4. "Write It Down" Released: May 7, 2012

World We View is the second studio album by the American Christian rock band Nine Lashes, released on February 14, 2012, through Tooth & Nail Records. It is the follow-up to their independent debut album Escape and was co-produced by Aaron Sprinkle and Trevor McNevan, the latter of whom was instrumental in getting the group signed and contributes guest vocals to the song "Adrenaline".

Upon release, World We View entered Billboard's Top Heatseekers chart at number 5 and received much critical acclaim for its diverse sound. Lead single "Anthem of the Lonely" also saw much success, peaking at number one on SoundScan's Christian Rock charts.

== Background ==
After the release of Escape, Nine Lashes was signed to Tooth & Nail Records at the recommendation of musician and producer Trevor McNevan, who had been given a copy of their album by a friend. McNevan was also heavily involved in the creation of World We View, contributing to the production, songwriting, and even providing guest vocals on the song "Adrenaline".

== Production, recording, and songwriting ==
In interviews, lead vocalist Jeremy Dunn noted the difference of approach between Escape producer Travis Wyrick and the team of McNevan and Aaron Sprinkle: Wyrick was "very high-strung. I mean, you'll get there at eight in the morning and think you're ready to work and he's already played racket ball for two hours and he's like, 'Are you guys sleeping in today; what's up?'...where Aaron is more relaxed. He's just, 'Let's work in our own time. Let's not push things. Let's just let it happen.' So it was just a very different dynamic."

Songs on the album were written as melodies before lyrics were added: "I will have a vocal melody before we even have the lyrics," said Dunn. "Then we'll go and listen and have the melody as a guideline and fill in the words with how the song makes me feel and think about."

== Musical style ==
World We View differs from Escape significantly, with the latter having a darker tone and having less production. In addition, World We View has been noted for its diverse sound, with individual tracks borrowing elements from nu metal ("Adrenaline" and "Anthem of the Lonely"), emo ("The Intervention" and "The Void"), screamo ("Our Darkest Day"), electronic rock ("Get Back"), a stadium rock ballad ("Afterglow"), post-grunge ("Believe Your Eyes"), funk rock ("Memo"), techno-metal ("Write It Down"), and an acoustic song ("My Friend").

== Release and promotion ==
World We View was released on February 14, 2012. It was promoted with the singles "Anthem of the Lonely" and "Get Back", both of which received music videos.

== Reception ==
Professional ratings
Review scores
Source	Rating
AllMusic	3.5/5 stars
CCM Magazine	4/5 stars
Christian Music Zine	3.67/5
Christianity Today	4/5 stars
Cross Rhythms	9/10 stars
HM	3/5 stars
Indie Vision Music	2/5 stars
Jesus Freak Hideout	3.5/5 stars
Louder Than the Music	4/5 stars
New Release Tuesday	4.5/5 stars

The album received a largely positive critical reaction from music critics. At CCM Magazine, Andrew Greer affirmed that the release "exhibit[s] an expansive sound, but every ounce is intended for mass appeal." Andy Argyrakis of Christianity Today called the album "full of boundless energy and musical maturity". At Cross Rhythms, Steven Bridge praised the "clever and inspiring" lyrics and stated that the band "have brought a fresh twist to the ever burgeoning Christian rock scene." Jon O'Brien of Allmusic described the album as "bursting with emotion and intensity" and proclaimed that "if they can continue to pursue the record's more genre-hopping approach with future material, then Nine Lashes could well find themselves crossing over to a mainstream audience."

At New Release Tuesday, Mary Nikkel called the work "ambitious" that was "one of the most solid rock debuts of the year." Michael Weaver of Jesus Freak Hideout said that "while this Birmingham band has not broken molds in a very stagnant genre of music, they have done enough to give some slight hope. They have taken a popular sound and attempted to make it their own using subtle variations here and there for an enjoyable listening experience." Also Jesus Freak Hideout's, Kevin Hoskins noted that "The ambient/experimental rock sound goes well with Jeremy Dunn's vocals and fans of your typical T&N bands will definitely be excited for what Nine Lashes have produced." Jono Davies of Louder Than the Music said that because the band is trying to appease fans some of it does not work well, but noted at other times the album comes across as "great hard rock".

At HM, Matt Conner felt that because of the album and the people surrounding the band they are "made for modern rock success", however some of their material was not unique. Sara Walz of Indie Vision Music seconds Conner on their musicality that comes across like we "have heard it before." Yet, Walz noted that in terms of lyricism they hit the nail on the head on a "strong debut". At Christian Music Zine, Jared Conaster stated that this was just a "stepping-stone" type of an album.

A more negative review came from Joe Williams of the Seattle Weekly. While he praised the ballad "Afterglow" as a "beautiful, slower track with sincerity and hope" and noted that the band had "potential for depth and musicality", he savaged the rest of the album: "World We View offers up ample palm-muted, distorted guitars and a steady stream of repetitive chords, but what's best: it's economical and practical. Forget purchasing the whole album, the first three songs are practically one in [sic] the same...It's nice to hear a song and think, "Oh! This reminds me of so-and-so." World We View takes it a step further and plays like a mashup of Story of the Year meets Breaking Benjamin meets Chevelle meets Three Days Grace meets ... you get the point. "

== Track listing ==
All tracks are written by Trevor McNevan, Jeremy Dunn, Jared Lankford, Jonathan Jefferson, Thomas Terrell and Jerry Jefferson, except where noted.

Album release
No.	Title	Writer(s)	Length
1.	"Anthem of the Lonely"		4:01
2.	"The Intervention"		3:35
3.	"Get Back"	Aaron Sprinkle, McNevan, Dunn, Lankford, Jefferson, Terrell, Jefferson	3:05
4.	"Afterglow"		4:26
5.	"Adrenaline" (featuring Trevor McNevan)		3:22
6.	"Believe Your Eyes"		3:39
7.	"Our Darkest Day" (featuring Ryan Clark)		3:31
8.	"Memo"		3:37
9.	"Write It Down"		2:49
10.	"The Void"		2:51
11.	"My Friend"		3:44
Total length:			38:40

Notes

- "Afterglow" originally appeared on Escape; the version here is a re-recording with a slightly different song structure.

== Chart performance ==
=== Album ===
Chart (2012)	Peak position
US Top Christian Albums (Billboard)	17
US Top Hard Rock Albums (Billboard)	13
US Heatseekers Albums (Billboard)	5
US Top Rock Albums (Billboard)	43

=== Singles ===
Year	Single	Chart Peak
Year	Single	Christian Rock
2011	"Anthem of the Lonely"	1
2012	"Get Back"	3
2012	"Write It Down"	8

== Personnel ==
Credits for World We View adapted from AllMusic.

Nine Lashes

- Jeremy Michael Dunn — vocals
- Adam "Tank" Jefferson — guitar
- Jonathan Jefferson — guitar
- Jared "Gus" Lankford — bass
- Thomas Noah Terrell — drums

Additional personnel

- Aaron Sprinkle — producer, engineer, guitar, keyboards, percussion, programming
- Trevor McNevan — producer, guest vocals on "Adrenaline"
- Matt Carter — bass guitar, engineer
- Chris Carmichael — engineer, string arrangements
- Ryan Clark — design, guest vocals on "Our Darkest Day"
- Caleb Kuhl — photography
- Troy Glessner — mastering
- J.R. McNeely — mixing
- Adam Hull — mixing assistant
