= Break the World =

Single by Nine Lashes

from the album From Water to War
- Released: October 29, 2013
- Genre: Electronic rock, hard rock
- Length: 3:02
- Label: Tooth & Nail
- Songwriters: Jeremy Dunn, Andrew Joseph Jefferson, Jon Jefferson, Jared Lankford, Trevor McNevan, Aaron Sprinkle, Noah Terrell

Nine Lashes singles chronology
"Write It Down" (2012)	"Break the World" (2013)	"Surrender" (2013)

"Break the World" is the lead single by alternative rock band Nine Lashes from their third album, From Water to War. It was released on October 29, 2013 by Tooth & Nail Records. The song was the No. 1 Billboard Christian Rock song on January 25, 2014 chart.

== Release ==
"Break the World" was digitally released as the lead single from From Water to War on October 29, 2013 by Tooth & Nail Records.

== Weekly charts ==
Chart (2014)	Peak position
US Christian Rock (Billboard)	1
