= Hyper Static Union =

American Christian alternative rock band

- Origin: Camas, Washington, US
- Genres: Christian rock, alternative rock, funk rock
- Members: Levi Neuschwander; Tim Downing
- Past members: Shawn Lewis; Ray Burnham; Andy Bell; Joseph Schlegel; Bryan Albrechtson; Mike Jackson

Hyper Static Union is an American Christian alternative rock band formed in Camas, Washington, United States. The band's first studio album was released May 9, 2006, and was produced by Mac Powell of Third Day. Their song "Praying for Sunny Days" was the ninth-most played song of 2006 on CHR radio and the most played new artist for CHR in 2006.

The band draws its name from a theological point in Christianity known as the hypostatic union.

As of March 8, 2015, the band's website domain registration expired.

According to frontman Shawn Lewis' LinkedIn profile, he was a part of the band for 12 years (from 1998 to 2010). His current musical project is called Beat Frequency.

Bryan Albrechtson died in his sleep on October 13, 2011. A concert was held in Camas in his honor.

Mike Jackson is now a psychiatric nurse in Portland, Oregon.

== Discography ==
=== Albums ===
- Hyper Static Union (self-released, 1998)
- Old School Tracks (self-released, 2003)
- Entropy Automatic (self-released, 2004)
- Lifegiver (RKT/Sony, 2006)
- Meet Him in the Air (Amplitude Media, 2008)
- The Siege (EP) (2nd Law Music, 2016)
