= Long Live the Rebels =

Studio album by Disciple
- Released: October 14, 2016
- Genre: Christian metal, hard rock
- Length: 43:43
- Label: Tooth & Nail
- Producer: Aaron Sprinkle

Disciple chronology
Live in Denmark (2016)	Long Live the Rebels (2016)	Love Letter Kill Shot (2019)

Singles from Long Live the Rebels
- 1. "Erase" Released: October 4, 2016; 2. "God Is With Us" Released: October 21, 2016

Long Live the Rebels is the eleventh studio album of the Christian rock band, Disciple, released on October 14, 2016.

== Background ==
Following the success of Attack's Kickstarter campaign, the band raised over double their initial fundraising goal in the Kickstarter for this album. The album was released on October 14, 2016. Two songs, "Erase" and "Underdog Fight Song", were released to backers when the campaign ended, and the first single, "God Is With Us", was set to be released to radio on October 24, 2016.

== Critical reception ==
Professional ratings
Review scores
Source	Rating
Jesus Freak Hideout	4/5 stars
CCM Magazine	3.5/5 stars

Matt Conner of CCM Magazine gave the album 3.5 stars out of 5, stating that the "melodic metal set sounds as tight as anything in the band’s catalog."

Christopher Smith of Jesus Freak Hideout wrote that Long Live The Rebels contains traces of Disciple's previous records, but like most other Disciple albums, it does have its own identity as a record."

== Track listing ==
No.	Title	Lyrics	Music	Length
1.	"First Love"	Kevin Young, Josiah Prince	Andrew Stanton	4:54
2.	"Long Live the Rebels"	Young, Prince	Stanton	3:42
3.	"Secret Weapon"	Prince	Prince	3:45
4.	"Erase"	Prince, Young	Prince, Young	4:04
5.	"Come My Way"	Prince, Young	Prince, Young	4:23
6.	"Underdog Fight Song"	Young	Stanton	3:20
7.	"God Is With Us"	Prince	Prince, Young, Aaron Sprinkle, Stanton	3:26
8.	"Spirit Fire"	Young	Young, Prince	3:10
9.	"Forever Starts Today"	Prince, Young	Prince, Stanton	3:24
10.	"Black Hole"	Young	Stanton, Joey West	3:31
11.	"Spinning"	Young	Young, Prince, Stanton, West	3:15
12.	"Empty Grave"	Young, Seth Mosley	Young, Mosley	3:04
Total length:				43:43

== Personnel ==
- Kevin Young – lead vocals
- Josiah Prince – rhythm guitar, bass guitar (tracks 4 & 11), backing vocals, co-lead vocals
- Andrew Stanton – lead guitar, bass guitar (track 6), backing vocals
- Joey West – drums

Production (Source: Discogs.com)

- Aaron Sprinkle – producer, engineering, mastering
- Paul Pavao – mixing (tracks 2, 3, 5, 6, 8–11)
- JR McNeely – mixing (tracks 7 & 12)
- Ben Grosse – mixing (tracks 1 & 4)
- Brad Blackwood – mastering
- Joyce Martin Sanders – backing vocals on track 12
- Dane Allen – backing vocals
- Ethan Luck – bass (tracks 1, 5, 8 & 10)
- Cody Driggers – bass (tracks 2, 3 & 9)
- Matt Arcaini – bass (track 7)

== Charts ==
Chart (2016)	Peak position
US Billboard 200	125
US Top Christian Albums (Billboard)	6
