= Disciple (album) =

Studio album by Disciple
- Released: June 7, 2005
- Studio: Lakeside Studios
- Genre: Christian metal, hard rock, alternative metal
- Length: 45:47
- Label: INO
- Producer: Travis Wyrick

Disciple chronology
Back Again (2003)	Disciple (2005)	Scars Remain (2006)

Special edition cover

Professional ratings
Review scores
Source	Rating
Cross Rhythms	9/10 squares
Jesus Freak Hideout	4/5 stars

Disciple is the fifth album released by Christian rock group Disciple, on June 7, 2005. When the single "The Wait is Over" was released, it broke several records in Christian music, including the longest spot at No. 1 on the R&R Charts.

A special edition was released on June 6, 2006 as a DualDisc containing four bonus songs and a making-of DVD. The covers between the two albums differ only in the background color but are otherwise identical.

== Track listing ==
All tracks are written by Disciple

No.	Title	Length
1.	"The Wait is Over"	2:50
2.	"Stripped Away"	2:57
3.	"Into Black"	3:46
4.	"Only You"	3:09
5.	"Rise Up"	2:33
6.	"Worth It All"	3:43
7.	"Shine Down"	2:52
8.	"Falling Over"	3:47
9.	"Go Ahead"	3:11
10.	"Beautiful"	3:10
11.	"Be the Quiet"	3:47
12.	"Backstabber"	2:59
13.	"All We Have is Now"	3:41
14.	"Tribute" (hidden track)	3:22
Total length:		42:25

Special edition bonus tracks
No.	Title	Length
15.	"I Feel You" (Depeche Mode cover)	4:11
16.	"Suicide"	2:36
17.	"Things Left Unsaid"	3:52
18.	"Pain"	3:10

- The bonus tracks were also released as an EP titled Things Left Unsaid.

DualDisc special edition side two

- "Day in the Life"
- Individual band interviews including producer commentary

== Personnel ==
Based on AllMusic credits:

- Kevin Young – vocals
- Brad Noah – guitar
- Tim Barrett – drums
- Joey Fife – bass
- Travis Wyrick – audio engineer, audio production, editing, engineer, loops, mixing, programming
- Mike Dearing – assistant engineer, editing, percussion
- Jeremy Cowart – photography

== Chart positions ==
Chart	Peak position
US Christian Albums (Billboard)	9
US Heatseekers Albums (Billboard)	8

== Awards ==
In 2006, the album was nominated for a Dove Award for Rock Album of the Year at the 37th GMA Dove Awards. The song "The Wait Is Over" was also nominated for Rock Recorded Song of the Year.
