= Israel Beachy =

Guitarist

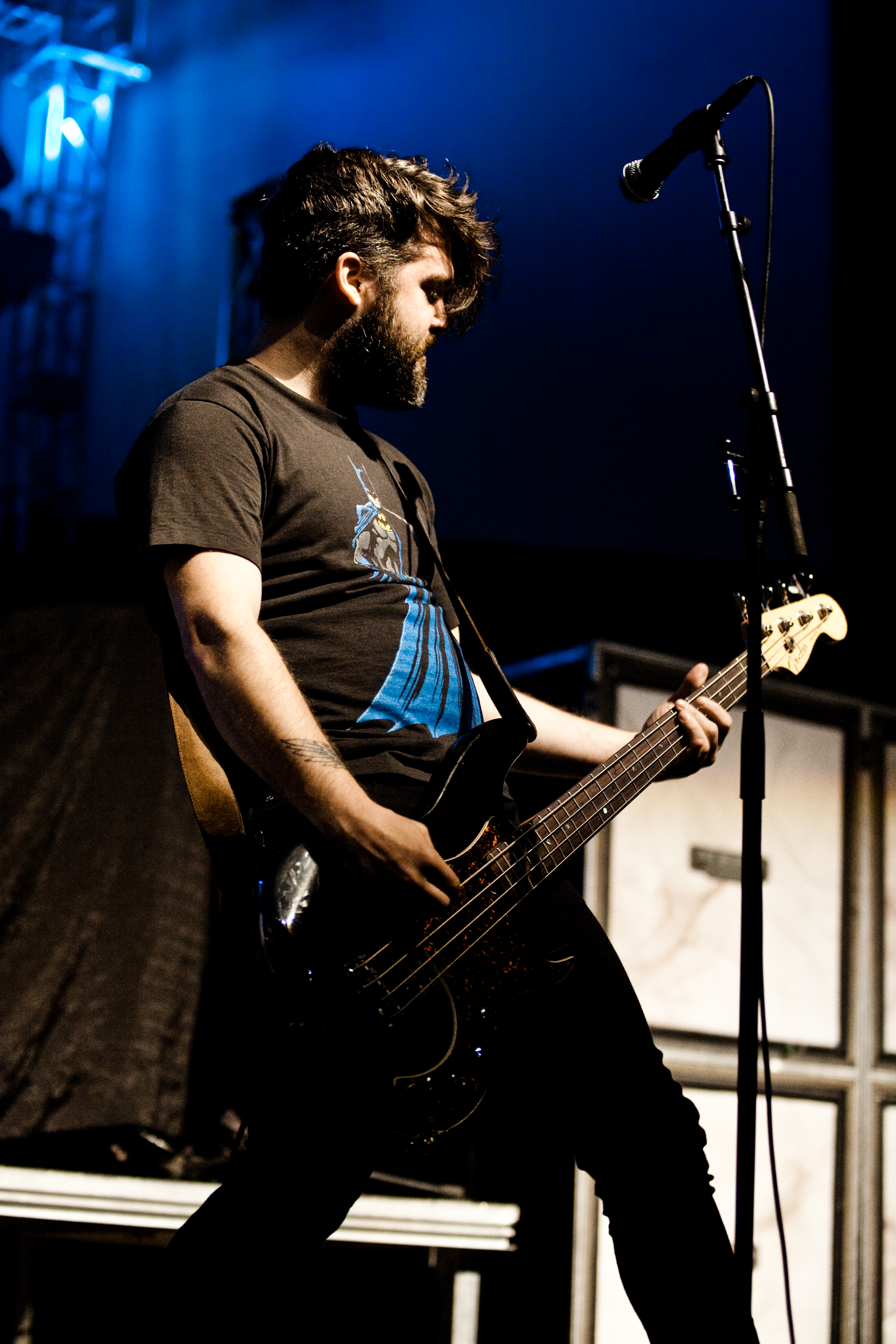
Beachy performing with Disciple in 2011

Israel Beachy was the bass guitarist for the Christian rock bands Staple and Disciple.

Israel was born in Plain City, Ohio, United States and lived there with his three brothers and father. Israel graduated from Delaware Christian School in Delaware, Ohio in 1998. He was the bassist for Staple from 2000 to 2006, when they broke up. He then started playing in a smaller band called Flowerdagger with A.J. (bassist/backing vocals for House of Heroes). He became the bassist for Disciple in January 2008, and was on 3 of their albums before he left in December 2012. All the while he was in the legendary band known as "The Awesomist"
