= Ascend (Nine Lashes album) =

Studio album by Nine Lashes
- Released: March 11, 2016
- Genre: Christian rock; electronic rock; pop rock; alternative dance
- Length: 38:24
- Label: BEC
- Producer: Aaron Sprinkle

Nine Lashes chronology
From Water to War (2014)	Ascend (2016)

Singles from From Water to War
- 1. "Galaxy" Released: December 4, 2015; 2. "Ascend" Released: April 14, 2016; 3. "The Chosen Ones" Released: July 9, 2016; 4. "Deeper" Released: November 16, 2016

Ascend is the fourth studio album from Nine Lashes and was released through BEC Recordings on March 11, 2016.

== Critical reception ==
Professional ratings
Review scores
Source	Rating
365 Days of Inspiring Media	4/5 stars
CCM Magazine	3/5 stars
The Christian Beat	4.2/5
CM Addict	3.5/5 stars
Jesus Freak Hideout	2.5/5 stars 3/5 stars 3.5/5 stars
Jesus Wired	71/100
New Release Today	4.5/5 stars

Matt Conner, rating the album three stars at CCM Magazine, writes, "another solid release from Nine Lashes." Awarding the album four and a half stars at New Release Today, Jonathan J. Francesco states, "Ascend is a terrific album on its own merit, with energetic hooks and truly great songs." Abby Baracskai, reviewing the album from Today's Christian Entertainment, says, "there are some really good lyrical messages encased in this album." Giving the album a 4.2 review by The Christian Beat, Chris Major writes, "While contrasting to much of Nine Lashes' previous work, Ascend is a bold, diverse collection indicating an exciting future for the band." Assigning the album a three and a half star review at CM Addict, Andrew Funderburk says, "[this] is a good release, but feels like a [hodgepodge] of different mixes thrown together." Joshua Andre, allotting the album four stars at 365 Days of Inspiring Media, Joshua Andre writes, "Granted, listening to Ascend shows me that Nine Lashes are four guys passionate and on fire for Jesus, and because of my love for Ascend, I reckon it’s about time to check out the band’s previous two albums, don’t you think?"

Allocating the album a 71 out of 100 review from Jesus Wired, says, "[he] can only hope that they stay true to their message and give fans (both old and new) a record worth holding on to in future." Sarah Berdon, signaling in a two and a half star review from Jesus Freak Hideout, states, "Fans who have been following Nine Lashes from the beginning will most likely be disappointed by this addition." Indicating in a three star review at Jesus Freak Hideout, Christopher Smith writes, "Nine Lashes will lose many fans over this change and it is unclear how many new fans will be drawn to this new sound given how oversaturated the Christian pop genre is." David Craft, rating the album three and a half stars for Jesus Freak Hideout, describes, "Within its genre, it's actually quite fantastic and listenable, which helps raise the bar for the rest of CCM. That much being said though, we can hope that this album will be looked at as a one-off experiment and the rockers will return to what they do best next time." Reviewing the album from Alpha Omega News, Ken Wiegman opines, "they do well by delivering a mountain of substance."

== Track listing ==
No.	Title	Length
1.	"Heartbeats"	2:59
2.	"Deeper"	2:42
3.	"Ascend"	3:02
4.	"The Chosen Ones"	3:53
5.	"Glorious"	4:50
6.	"Galaxy"	3:08
7.	"Eyes on You"	3:43
8.	"Brand New Life"	3:19
9.	"Stolen"	3:15
10.	"Love Still Shines"	4:06
11.	"Christ in Me"	3:41
Total length:		38:24

== Credits ==
- Jeremy Dunn - vocals
- Jonathan Jefferson - rhythm guitar, artwork
- Joseph Jefferson - lead guitar
- Jared Lankford - bass guitar
- Noah Terrell - drums

Production

- Aaron Sprinkle - producer, engineering, mixing, keyboards, programming
- Troy Gelssner - mastering
- Lee Steffen - photography

== Chart performance ==
Chart (2016)	Peak position
US Christian Albums (Billboard)	46
