= This Might Sting a Little =

Studio album by Disciple
- Released: 1999
- Recorded: Lakeside Studios
- Genre: Christian metal, nu metal, groove metal
- Length: 51:06
- Label: Slain, Rugged
- Producer: Travis Wyrick

Disciple chronology
My Daddy Can Whip Your Daddy (1997)	This Might Sting a Little (1999)	By God (2001)

Remaster cover

Professional ratings
Review scores
Source	Rating
HM Magazine	(unrated)

This Might Sting a Little was the second album by Christian metal group Disciple, released in 1999. The album contained a bonus disc for the buyer to "give the CD to someone that is not saved!". This album was remastered and re-released in 2004. This is the only Disciple album to contain no Ballads of any form.

== Track listing ==
1. "I Just Know" – 4:22
2. "Golden Calf" – 3:16
3. "Big Bad Wolf" – 3:53
4. "1, 2, Conductor" – 3:32
5. "Mud Puddle" – 3:51
6. "Worship Conspiracy" – 2:44
7. "10 Minute Oil Change" – 2:54
8. "Turmoil" – 5:09
9. "Hello" – 2:27
10. "Bring the Heat" – 3:08
11. "Bernie's Situation" – 4:47
12. "Underneath" – 3:56
13. "Furthermore" (contains a sermon given by Kevin) – 7:07

Bonus disc track listing

1. "I Just Know" – 4:24
2. "Golden Calf" – 3:18
3. "Furthermore" (contains a sermon given by Kevin) – 7:08

Total length: 14:50

== Personnel ==
- Kevin Young – vocals, bass guitar
- Brad Noah – guitars
- Tim Barrett – drums
- Travis Wyrick – producer
