= By God =

Studio album by Disciple
- Released: February 6, 2001
- Studio: Lakeside Studios
- Genres: Christian metal, nu metal, groove metal
- Length: 66:37
- Labels: Slain, Rugged
- Producers: Travis Wyrick, Disciple

Disciple chronology
This Might Sting a Little (1999)	By God (2001)	Back Again (2003)

Professional ratings
Review scores
Source	Rating
AllMusic	3/5 stars
HM Magazine	(not rated)
Jesus Freak Hideout	4/5 stars

By God is the third album by Christian metal group Disciple, released in 2001. It is a dual-disc; the second disc was a bonus disc for the buyer to give "to someone who needs it...". The album has been remastered and re-released just like the last album (This Might Sting a Little). The cover was changed to a different style.

== Track listing ==
All tracks by Disciple

1. "By God" – 3:48
2. "Not Rock Stars" – 3:38
3. "God of Elijah" – 3:10
4. "Knocked Down" – 3:21
5. "Blow the House Down" – 4:03
6. "Coal" – 3:26
7. "Can't Breathe" – 4:44
8. "Salt Lamp" – 3:23
9. "You Are Here" – 4:14
10. "Thousand Things" – 6:03
11. "99" – 2:39
12. "Laugh track" – 0:20
13. "Whiny Britches" – 3:18
14. "You Rock My Socks Off" – 3:08
15. "Trouble" (mini-sermon) – 0:15
16. "Hate Your Guts" – 3:40
17. "Whether They Like It Or Not" – 4:22
18. "Not Since Breakfast" – 3:13
19. "Sick and Tired of Being Sick and Tired" – 4:01
20. "But Wait There's More" – 3:36
21. "Rich Man" – 4:05
22. "Sermon" (given by Kevin) – 4:10

Bonus disc track listing

1. "By God" – 3:50
2. "Not Rock Stars" – 3:39
3. "Rich Man" – 4:01
4. "Sermon" (given by Kevin) – 4:10

== Personnel ==
Based on AllMusic credits:

- Kevin Young – vocals, bass guitar
- Brad Noah – guitar
- Tim Barrett – drums
- Travis Wyrick – producer
- Dennis Olson – cover design
