= From Water to War =

Studio album by Nine Lashes
- Released: January 21, 2014
- Genre: Alternative rock, hard rock, pop rock
- Length: 35:09
- Label: Tooth & Nail
- Producer: Jasen Rauch, Aaron Sprinkle

Nine Lashes chronology
World We View (2012)	From Water to War (2014)	Ascend (2016)

Singles from From Water to War
- 1. "Break the World" Released: October 29, 2013; 2. "Surrender" Released: December 17, 2013; 3. "Never Back Down" Released: September 29, 2014; 4. "You Are the Light" Released: January 22, 2015; 5. "Cover Your Own" Released: May 30, 2015

From Water to War is the third studio album by the American Christian rock band Nine Lashes. The album was released on January 21, 2014, through Tooth & Nail Records. It was produced by Jasen Rauch and Aaron Sprinkle.

== Background ==
The album is releasing on January 21, 2014 by Tooth & Nail Records, which this is the third studio album for the band, and it was produced by Jasen Rauch and Aaron Sprinkle.

== Music and lyrics ==
The music has shifted somewhat from their former album World We View by adding in some electronic elements into the sound that is described as alternative rock, hard rock, pop rock, and a "blend of rock, a dash of electronic, and a slight touch of pop". Lead singer Jeremy Dunn stated that they have enhanced their sound for the album.

== Singles and early releases ==
The track "Break the World" was released as a single on October 29, 2013. It peaked No. 1 on BDSradio.com's Christian Rock National Airplay chart on January 15, 2014. Also, "Surrender" was released on Tooth and Nail's YouTube channel a month before the album was set to release. Nine Lashes also posted an exclusive stream on RadioU of the entire album about a week before the release date, because the band "couldn't wait any longer." (from official Facebook page, January 16, 2014).

== Critical reception ==
Professional ratings
Review scores
Source	Rating
CCM Magazine	4/5 stars
HM Magazine	3/5 stars
Indie Vision Music	3/5 stars
Jesus Freak Hideout	4/5 stars
New Release Tuesday	4/5 stars

From Water to War received generally positive reception from six music critics. At CCM Magazine, Andy Argyrakis rated it four stars, calling it "compelling" that expands "upon its alternative rock experimentation with electronic enhancement, the groups songwriting captures intense spiritual growth, sure to resonate with anyone seeking authenticity." Mary Nikkel of New Release Tuesday rated it likewise, noting how "The interplay between searing guitar work and chilling electronic influences make this an album to remember". At Jesus Freak Hideout, Michael Weaver rated it four stars, stating that "Nine Lashes have crafted something very interesting this time around." David Craft also of Jesus Freak Hideout rated it four stars, writing that it is a "strong album". At Indie Vision Music, Lee Brown rated it three stars, saying that it is a "solid album that had me excited to come back for more." Jordan Gonzalez of HM rated it three stars, calling the album "anticlimactic at best and generic at worst."

== Track listing ==
All tracks are written by Nine Lashes except where noted.

No.	Title	Writer(s)	Length
1.	"Never Back Down"		3:23
2.	"Break the World"	Aaron Sprinkle	3:02
3.	"Where I Belong"	Sprinkle	3:37
4.	"Lights We Burn"	Trevor McNevan, Jasen Rauch	3:38
5.	"Surrender"	Rauch	3:54
6.	"You Are the Light"		3:38
7.	"In the Dark"	Rauch	3:32
8.	"Light It Up"	Rauch	3:00
9.	"Love Me Now"	Sprinkle	3:29
10.	"Cover Your Own"	Sprinkle	3:56
Total length:			35:09

== Credits ==
Musicians

- Jeremy Dunn – vocals
- Adam Jefferson – guitar
- Jonathan Jefferson – guitar
- Jared Lankford – bass
- Noah Terrell – drums

Production

- Aaron Sprinkle – producer, engineering, additional guitars, percussion, mastering
- Jasen Rauch – producer, engineering, mixing, keyboards, programming
- Brandon Thigpen – digital editing
- Paul Pavao – mixing

Additional musicians

- Mark Holman – backing vocals
- Brandon Thigpen – backing vocals

== Charts ==
Chart (2014)	Peak position
US Billboard 200	121
US Top Christian Albums (Billboard)	8
US Top Hard Rock Albums (Billboard)	8
US Independent Albums (Billboard)	29
US Top Rock Albums (Billboard)	43
