= Lights Come Down =

EP by High Flight Society
- Released: December 20, 2011
- Genre: Christian rock
- Length: 22:42
- Label: Independent

High Flight Society chronology
Par Avion (2009)	Lights Come Down (2011)

Professional ratings
Review scores
Source	Rating
Jesus Freak Hideout	3.5/5 stars

Lights Come Down is the third EP released by Christian rock band, High Flight Society. It is also the band's final released work. It was released on iTunes under the label, "Caliber Recordings".

== Track listing ==
No.	Title	Length
1.	"The Proof"	3:28
2.	"Direction"	3:44
3.	"Let It Burn"	3:51
4.	"Move Like Daylight"	3:51
5.	"Stand Up"	3:18
6.	"Lights Come Down"	4:28
Total length:		22:42

== Personnel ==
- Jason Wilkes – lead vocals, rhythm guitar
- Michael Packer – backing vocals, lead guitar
- John Packer – backing vocals, bass guitar
- Scotty Lockridge – drums, percussion
