= Skeleton Psalms =

Studio album by Disciple
- Released: April 28, 2023
- Studio: The Ranch
- Genre: Christian rock, hard rock, alternative metal
- Label: BEC Recordings
- Producer: Josiah Prince

Disciple chronology
Love Letter Kill Shot (2019)	Skeleton Psalms (2023)

Singles from Skeleton Psalms
- 1. "The Executioner" Released: January 13, 2023; 2. "Promise to Live" Released: February 1, 2023; 3. "Bad Words" Released: March 30, 2023; 4. "If You Say So" Released: September 27, 2024; 5. "Sound The Alarm" Released: February 28, 2025; 6. "Resurrecting Reasons (feat. TJ Harris)" Released: March 28, 2025

Professional ratings
Review scores
Source	Rating
Jesus Freak Hideout	4.5/5 stars
The Blast FM	5/5 stars

Skeleton Psalms is the thirteenth studio album by Christian rock band Disciple. It is the band's first album in four years and was produced by the band's guitarist, Josiah Prince, at his home studio, The Ranch.

== Background ==
On January 13, 2023, the band released the first single for the album, "The Executioner", which marked the first new music the band had released since Love Letter Kill Shot in 2019. On February 1, 2023, the album's second single, "Promise to Live", was released. The final single "Bad Words" was issued with the preorder for the album and tracklist.

A deluxe edition of the album was released on April 25, 2025.

== Themes ==
"Every single song is intertwined and connected with each other," vocalist Kevin Young stated. "They all deal with similar themes, they all have an element of being autobiographical. It's almost like chapter 1, chapter 2, chapter 3: human depravity, the unconditional love of God, then victory."

"The Executioner" deals with "coming to grips with your flaws, your failures, your shame, your sin. It's realizing that no, I don't want to celebrate anything about what I've done in this life. I want to lay my life down in exchange for a better one that God has for me."

"Promise to Live" was derived from a sermon Young used to make. "It's the idea that we all are in this world together, and are all in recovery together, from the trauma of this world and this life. We're not fighting alone. We're fighting together. We make this promise to God and to each other: to not give up, to not lose hope, to not stop fighting. To live for the most precious gift we have, which is life."

"Bad Words" is concerned with Christians being told what to say and what not to say: "We really like to write songs that make people excited about their faith, hopefully not make people annoying, abusive or violent Christians. More that they've set the constitution of their heart to where they are unashamed of the gospel of Jesus Christ: I am going to love you. I'm going to love you no matter your political party, or your race, or any other kind of adjective that separates you from someone else. For God so loved the world, and therefore I so love the world. But if you think it's a bad word for me to say Jesus, I just need you to know that I'm going to say what I believe, because of my love and my passion for Him and my love and my passion for people. That they need to know that there is a God. And He did not come to the world to condemn the world, but He came to the world to save them. That's our message: this bad word known as Jesus."

== Track listing ==
All tracks are written by Disciple.

No.	Title	Length
1.	"The Executioner"	4:07
2.	"Promise to Live"	4:54
3.	"Skeleton Psalm"	3:50
4.	"Bad Words"	3:28
5.	"Resurrecting Reasons"	4:17
6.	"Dawning of Deliverance"	3:53
7.	"20/20 Blind"	4:43
8.	"Scapegoat"	4:38
9.	"Bow Down"	4:15
10.	"For the Life of Me"	4:20
Total length:		42:20

Deluxe Edition
No.	Title	Length
1.	"Make War"	4:13
2.	"If You Say So"	3:47
3.	"Neversleep"	4:23
4.	"Sound The Alarm"	3:01
5.	"Resurrecting Reasons" (feat. TJ Harris of Decyfer Down)	4:17
6.	"Promise To Live" (Acoustic)	4:45
7.	"The Executioner" (Live)	4:52
8.	"Skeleton Psalm" (Live)	3:52
9.	"Promise to Live" (Live)	4:57
10.	"I Just Know" (Live)	4:48
11.	"Long Live the Rebels" (Live)	3:46
12.	"O God Save Us All" (Live)	5:50

== Personnel ==
Disciple

- Kevin Young – vocals
- Josiah Prince – guitars, bass, backing vocals, production
- Joey West – drums
- Andrew Stanton – lead guitar, executive producer (track 2)

Additional personnel

- Traa Daniels – bass (tracks 1, 2, 8 & 10)
- Dane Allen – backing vocals
- Marco Pera – backing vocals
- TJ Harris – guest vocals on "Resurrecting Reasons"
- Lester Estelle – engineering
- Sam Moses – mastering
- Nick Rad – mixing
