= Nine Lashes =

American Christian rock band

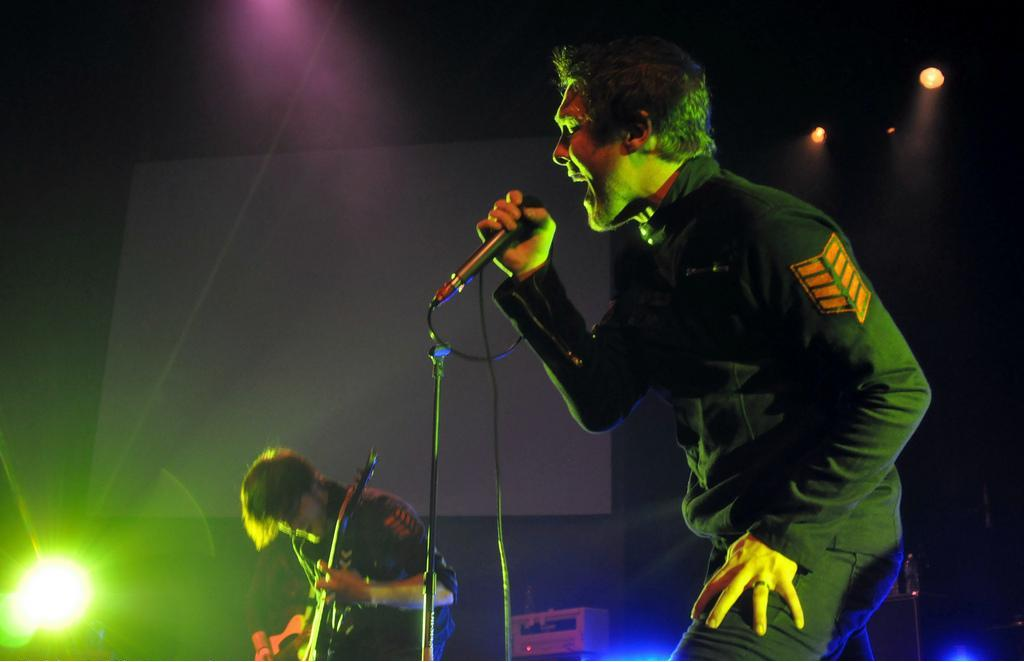
- Nine Lashes performing in 2011.

Background information
- Origin: Birmingham, Alabama, U.S.
- Genres: Christian rock; alternative metal; Christian metal
- Years active: 2006–present
- Labels: Tooth & Nail, BEC
- Members: Jeremy Dunn; Joseph Andrew Jefferson; Jon Jefferson; Adam "Tank" Jefferson; Jared Lankford; Noah "Cap'n" Terrell
- Past members: Keith Cunningham; Daniel Sloan
- Website: ninelashesmusic.com

Nine Lashes is an American Christian rock band from Birmingham, Alabama formed in 2006. They independently released their first album, Escape, in 2009 before Trevor McNevan of Thousand Foot Krutch brought them to the attention of Tooth & Nail Records. Upon signing to the label, the band recorded their second album World We View and released it on February 14, 2012. The album sold well, making several Billboard charts. The band released their third album, From Water to War on January 21, 2014. After a change in direction, the band released their fourth album, the electronica and Christian rock styled Ascend on March 11, 2016.

== History ==
The band was formed in 2006 around founding members guitarist Adam "Tank" Jefferson and original drummer Keith Cunningham, who had played together in another band for several years prior. Jared "Gus" Lankford and Adam's brother Jon Jefferson joined as bassist and guitarist, and lead singer Jeremy Dunn joined in 2007 after the band's original lead vocalist Daniel Sloan got married and decided to settle down. During this early period, the band opened for Day of Fire at Life Church in Trussville, Alabama, was interviewed on WDJC-FM, and worked extensively with the organization Teen Challenge. On June 5, 2009, the band independently released their debut album Escape with producer Travis Wyrick on Collide Records.

In the first of a series of events Dunn later described as "completely a God thing", the band was hoping to increase their visibility via a performance at Gardendale, Alabama's annual Magnolia Festival. To this end, Jon sent a copy of Escape to Joe Posey, the festival's promoter. Posey liked the album and decided to attend one of the band's concerts to see if they could play live. Even more impressed by the band's live performance, he forwarded his copy of Escape along with a recommendation to his longtime friend Trevor McNevan, himself a well-known musician and producer. Recovering at home from a ruptured appendix, McNevan was able to hear the album despite his busy schedule, shared Posey's enthusiasm, and passed the album on to Brandon Ebel, president and CEO of Tooth & Nail Records (to which McNevan's own bands Thousand Foot Krutch and FM Static were signed). This resulted in Nine Lashes signing with the label, which was officially announced on June 27, 2011.

Later in 2011, Nine Lashes was selected to join I Am Empire and Blood and Water on the former's Kings and Queens Tour, replacing original co-headliners Queens Club, who had ended up disbanding before the tour started. They also joined the American leg of Red's REDvolution tour in February and March 2012, and are scheduled to play at the annual Creation Northwest and Kingdom Bound festivals in the summer.

The band's second album, World We View, was released on February 14, 2012. The album was co-produced by McNevan and Aaron Sprinkle and featured guest vocals from McNevan and Demon Hunter frontman Ryan Clark. In the week of March 3, 2012, the album debuted on Billboard and peaked at No. 17 on the Christian Albums chart, No. 5 on Top Heatseekers, No. 13 on Top Hard Rock Albums, and No. 43 on Top Rock Albums.

The band announced their "From Water" tour on August 9, 2013, to support their new album, From Water to War, which was released on January 21, 2014. On October 29, they released a new single titled "Break the World" and soon after released "Surrender" - both early releases from their new album. In an interview with CCM Magazine, Dunn stated: "We really pushed ourselves to add to our sound with this album. We really wanted to take the digital aspect of our sound from the last album, like the 'Anthem [of the Lonely]' intro or 'The Intervention,' and expand upon it. I think we ended up with a really well-rounded album."

The band's fourth album, Ascend, was released on March 11, 2016. The album largely abandons the group's hard rock sound in favor of EDM and dubstep-inspired music. However, eight singles released between 2018 and 2024 show a return to hard rock.

After a lot of teasers, the band announced their return to touring, along with return of band members Adam and Joseph Jefferson and Lankford.

== Members ==
=== Current members ===
- Jeremy Dunn — lead vocals (2007–present)
- Jonathan David Jefferson — rhythm guitar (2006–present, 2025–present), bass guitar (2016–2025)
- Jared Lankford — bass (2006–2016, 2025–present)
- Joseph Andrew Jefferson — lead guitar (2015–present), bass guitar (2016–2025)
- Noah Terrell — drums (2009–present)
- Adam “Tank” Jefferson — lead guitar (2006–2015, 2025–present)

=== Former members ===
- Daniel Sloan — lead vocals (pre-2007)
- Keith Cunningham — drums (2006–2009)

== Discography ==
=== Albums ===
Released	Title	Label	Peak Chart Positions					
Released	Title	Label	US 200	US Christ.	US Heat.	US Indie	US Hard Rock	US Rock
June 5, 2009	Escape	Collide Records	–	—	—	–	—	—
February 14, 2012	World We View	Tooth & Nail Records	–	17	5	–	13	43
January 21, 2014	From Water to War	Tooth & Nail Records	121	8	–	29	8	43
March 11, 2016	Ascend	BEC Recordings	—	46	—	—	—	—

=== Singles ===
Released	Title	Chart peak		Album
Released	Title	Christian Airplay	Christian Rock	Album
2009	"Words of Red"	—	15	Escape
2009	"Word of Advice"	—	25	Escape
2011	"Anthem of the Lonely"	—	1	World We View
2012	"Get Back"	—	3	World We View
2012	"Write It Down"	—	6	World We View
2013	"Break the World"	—	1	From Water to War
2013	"Surrender"	47	1	From Water to War
2014	"Never Back Down"	—	1	From Water to War
2015	"You Are the Light"	—	1	From Water to War
2015	"Cover Your Own"	—	8	From Water to War
2015	"Galaxy"	—	1	Ascend
2016	"Ascend"	—	28	Ascend
2016	"The Chosen Ones"	—	12	Ascend
2016	"Deeper"	22	43	Ascend
2018	"Breaking Out"	—	27	Non-album single
2020	"Guilty Hands"	—	31	Non-album single
2020	"Shadows"	—	—	Non-album single
2020	"Dear Self"	—	—	Non-album single
2020	"Rise"	—	—	Non-album single
2020	"Follow"	—	—	Non-album single
2021	"Among the Stars"	—	—	Non-album single
2024	"Ready to See"	—	—	Non-album single
2026	"The Fool (Mayday)"	—	—	Non-album single
2026	"Lifeless"	—	—	Non-album single

=== Music videos ===
Year	Title
2012	"Anthem of the Lonely"
2012	"Get Back"
2014	"Surrender"
