= Write This Down (album) =

Studio album by Write This Down
- Released: April 20, 2010
- Recorded: 2009
- Genre: Post-hardcore, Christian rock, metalcore
- Length: 34:10
- Label: Tooth & Nail
- Producer: Rob Hawkins

Write This Down chronology
Write This Down EP (2007)	Write This Down (2010)

Professional ratings
Review scores
Source	Rating
AbsolutePunk	(79%)
Jesus Freak Hideout	4/5 stars
Melodic.net	3.5/5 stars

Write This Down is the debut album by the American Christian rock band, Write This Down. The album marks the band's debut on their first record label, Tooth & Nail Records. Write This Down contains a revised version of the song, "Alarm the Alarm," which was the name of the band's first EP. The first version was on their independently released EP, Write This Down. This album peaked at No. 45 on the Christian Albums chart published by Billboard.

== Track listing ==
No.	Title	Length
1.	"Alarm the Alarm"	3:30
2.	"Despite Your Valour"	3:35
3.	"Renegade"	3:10
4.	"Hand Grenades"	3:16
5.	"I Never Said that I Was Through with You"	2:55
6.	"Center of Attention"	2:54
7.	"Citadel"	3:57
8.	"Redemption"	3:13
9.	"We Shot the Moon"	2:44
10.	"Kings and Councilors"	3:17
11.	"Heaven and Hell"	1:44

== Music videos ==
- "Alarm the Alarm"
- "Renegade"

== Personnel ==
- Johnny Collier – lead vocals
- Nick Lombardo – bass
- Chad Nichols – drums
- Nate Rockwell – guitars, backing vocals

Additional personnel Rob Hawkins – producer, engineer Ben Phillips – drum engineer David Bendeth – mixing Ainslie Grosser – mixing Troy Glessner – mastering Caleb Kuhl – photography Ryan Clark – design
