= Rocketown Records =

Independent record label

Rocketown Records was an independent record label which was started in 1996 by Michael W. Smith. In the fall of 1995, met with Don Donahue, A&R director at Reunion Records, to discuss creation of the label.

In 1996, Word Records bought a minority share of the company.

== Imprint ==
In 2006, Rocketown started the RKT Music imprint label to concentrate on a younger demographic. The first album released was Lifegiver by Hyper Static Union as a partnership between Rocketown and the Christian rock band Third Day. Hyper Static Union was signed to a production deal with Third Day's Consuming Fire Productions. Additional releases by RKT include Learning to Lose by the Turning and High Flight Society.

== Roster ==
- Alathea (active, currently independent)
- Christine Dente
- Ronnie Freeman
- Shaun Groves (active, currently independent)
- High Flight Society
- Hyper Static Union (active, with Amplitude Media)
- Geoff Moore
- Reuben Morgan (active, current worship pastor of Hillsong Church)
- Michael Olson (active)
- Michael W. Smith
- Out of the Grey (on hiatus)
- Ginny Owens (active)
- Chris Rice (active)
- George Rowe III
- Taylor Sorensen
- The Swift (disbanded in 2006)
- The Turning
- Watermark (inactive)
- Wilshire

== See also ==
- List of record labels
