= Par Avion (EP) =

EP by High Flight Society
- Released: June 16, 2009
- Genre: Christian rock
- Length: 12:49
- Label: Independent
- Producer: Thad Beaty, Jason Collum (Sorted Noise)

High Flight Society chronology
High Flight Society (2007)	Par Avion (2009)	Lights Come Down (2011)

Professional ratings
Review scores
Source	Rating
Jesus Freak Hideout	4/5 stars 3.5/5 stars

Par Avion is the second EP released by Christian rock band High Flight Society. It was released on June 16, 2009. This EP is also the band's first work to be released independently, and to feature Jerad Griffin on the rhythm guitar and background vocals.

== Critical reception ==
According to Roger Gelwicks of Jesus Freak Hideout, "It's hard to find much wrong with this EP, as pretty much everything is musically and lyrically solid."

== Track listing ==
No.	Title	Length
1.	"Give It Up"	3:07
2.	"Inhaling a Bullet"	2:52
3.	"Run From Yesterday"	3:15
4.	"Come On Sister"	3:34
Total length:		12:49

== Personnel ==
- Jason Wilkes – lead vocals
- Jerad Griffin – backing vocals, rhythm guitar
- Michael Packer – backing vocals, lead guitar
- John Packer – backing vocals, bass guitar
- Scotty Lockridge – drums, percussion
