= Vultures (EP) =

EP by Disciple
- Released: September 25, 2015
- Genres: Christian metal, alternative metal, Southern metal
- Length: 21:03
- Label: Independent
- Producer: Matt Arcaini

Disciple chronology
Attack (2014)	Vultures (2015)	Live in Denmark (2016)

Vultures is the third extended play from Disciple. They released the EP on September 25, 2015, independently.

== Background ==
While working on the album Attack, the band wrote many songs, including the six songs on this EP. They did not include these songs on the album, claiming that they did not thematically complement the album.

In an interview, lead singer Kevin Young stated that the song "Bring the Dead to Life" was written by Jason Wilkes. The story behind the song was that Wilkes' friend saw his former band's deceased drummer, Scotty Lockridge, in her dream. Wilkes went on to write this song, dedicating it to Lockridge.

== Critical reception ==
Professional ratings
Review scores
Source	Rating
The Christian Beat	4.8/5
Jesus Freak Hideout	4/5 stars
Jesus Wired	94/100
New Release Today	4.5/5 stars

Awarding the EP four and a half stars for New Release Today, Mary Nikkel states, "Vultures is set apart from the spiritually empowering fight songs found on Attack by its brooding edge, drawing out the midnights of the soul in order to declare the presence of Christ's grace in even the darkest moments." Christopher Smith, giving the EP four stars at Jesus Freak Hideout, writes, "Like Attack, all the elements that make a high caliber rock album are present on Vultures." Rating the EP a 4.8 out of five from The Christian Beat, Chris Major says, "Vultures is as well-produced as any other Disciple record and perfectly complements their iconic collection." Stephanie Crail, rating the album a 94 percent for Jesus Wired, says, "Vultures is yet another remarkable album in an already impressive career, and only serves as further proof that Disciple is well deserving of their place in the realm of Christian rock."

== Track listing ==
No.	Title	Lyrics	Music	Length
1.	"Sayonara"	Kevin Young	Trent Reiff, Josiah Prince, Andrew Stanton, Young	2:57
2.	"Snooze"	Young, Jason Wilkes	Wilkes, Prince, Young	2:49
3.	"Awakening"	Young	Stanton	3:48
4.	"More"	Young, Wilkes	Stanton	3:12
5.	"Bring the Dead to Life"	Young, Wilkes	Wilkes	3:49
6.	"Breaking Down"	Young	Young, Prince	4:28
Total length:				21:03

== Credits ==
The Band

- Kevin Young - vocals
- Andrew Stanton - lead guitar
- Josiah Prince - rhythm guitar, programming
- Joey West - drums, artwork, layout

Production

- Matt Arcaini - producer, engineering, bass
- Ainslie Grosser - mixing
- Dan Shike - mastering
- Fred Williams - programming
- John DeNosky - digital editing

== Charts ==
Chart (2015)	Peak position
US Top Christian Albums (Billboard)	49
