= High Flight Society (album) =

Studio album by High Flight Society
- Released: June 5, 2007
- Genre: Christian rock
- Length: 41:17
- Label: RTK

High Flight Society chronology
From Far Above Somewhere (2006)	High Flight Society (2007)	Par Avion (2009)

Singles from High Flight Society
- 1. "Declaration" Released: April 17, 2007; 2. "Time Is Running Out" Released: May 15, 2007

Professional ratings
Review scores
Source	Rating
In-Review	(not rated)
Jesus Freak Hideout	4.5/5 stars

High Flight Society is the only album by Christian rock band High Flight Society. It was released on June 5, 2007.

== Track listing ==
No.	Title	Length
1.	"Time Is Running Out"	3:30
2.	"Up Above"	4:13
3.	"Sweet Redeemer"	3:42
4.	"Learn to Let Go"	3:21
5.	"Declaration"	4:09
6.	"Loss for Words"	3:23
7.	"Escaping"	3:33
8.	"Wake Up"	3:39
9.	"What's Wrong"	3:26
10.	"I Will Follow You"	3:45
11.	"Get By"	4:36
Total length:		41:17

== Personnel ==
- Jason Wilkes – lead vocals, rhythm guitar
- Michael Packer – lead guitar, backing vocals
- John Packer – bass guitar, backing vocals
- Scotty Lockridge – drums, percussion
