= Southern Hospitality (album) =

Studio album by Disciple
- Released: October 21, 2008
- Genre: Christian rock; Southern rock; hard rock
- Length: 45:53
- Label: INO
- Producer: Travis Wyrick

Disciple chronology
Scars Remain (2006)	Southern Hospitality (2008)	Horseshoes & Handgrenades (2010)

Singles from Southern Hospitality
- 1. "321" Released: October 2008; 2. "Whatever Reason" Released: December 2008; 3. "Romance Me" Released: March 2009; 4. "Right There" Released: June 2009; 5. "Lay My Burdens" Released: October 2009

Professional ratings
Review scores
Source	Rating
AllMusic	4/5 stars
Jesus Freak Hideout	4/5 stars

Southern Hospitality is the seventh album from Christian rock group Disciple, released October 21, 2008. It debuted at #98 on the Billboard 200. "Right There", "321", "Romance Me", "Lay My Burdens", and "Whatever Reason" were all released as radio singles. This would be the last album to feature longtime members Brad Noah, Joey Fife, and Tim Barrett.

== Track listing ==
All tracks are written by Disciple.

No.	Title	Length
1.	"Southern Hospitality"	3:30
2.	"Romance Me"	3:32
3.	"321"	4:18
4.	"Whisper So Loud"	3:39
5.	"Whatever Reason"	3:17
6.	"Phoenix Rising"	3:45
7.	"Liar"	3:57
8.	"Falling Star"	3:44
9.	"Right There"	3:22
10.	"On My Way Down"	3:47
11.	"Lay My Burdens"	4:45
12.	"Savior"	4:21
Total length:		45:57

== Credits ==
- Kevin Young – vocals
- Brad Noah – lead, rhythm guitars
- Israel Beachy – bass
- Tim Barrett – drums

Production

- Travis Wyrick – producer, engineering
- Joe Barresi – mixing
- Mike Dearing – engineering
- Adam Ayan – mastering
- Jeff Moseley – executive producer
- Caleb Kuhl – photography
- Dana Salsede – creative director
- James Rueger – A&R

Additional musicians

- Lester Estelle – backing vocals
- Kenny Springs – backing vocals
- Everly Jack – backing vocals
- Angel Higgs – backing vocals
- Doug Metzler – gang vocals
- Jordan Beach – gang vocals
- Matt Brewster – gang vocals

== Awards ==
The album was nominated for a Dove Award for Rock Album of the Year at the 40th GMA Dove Awards.
