= Dear X (You Don't Own Me) =

Single by Disciple

from the album Horseshoes & Handgrenades
- Released: July 20, 2010
- Recorded: 2010
- Genre: Heavy metal, alternative metal, Christian metal, sludge metal
- Length: 3:35
- Label: INO
- Songwriters: Kevin Young, Ben Glover, Rob Hawkins
- Producer: Rob Hawkins

Disciple singles chronology
"Lay My Burdens" (2009)	"Dear X (You Don't Own Me)" (2010)	"Invisible" (2010)

"Dear X (You Don't Own Me)" or "Dear X, You Don't Own Me" is a song by Christian metal band Disciple from their 2010 album Horseshoes & Handgrenades. It was released as the first single on July 20, 2010. The song peaked at No. 30 on the Hot Christian Songs chart. It lasted 21 weeks on the overall chart, their longest charting single on the chart The song is played in a F minor key at 138 beats per minute.

== Composition ==
The song is written in the format of a letter. Lead vocalist Kevin Young explained to Kevin Davis of New Release Tuesday that they had written the song as if they were writing a letter to the things of their past. The name "Dear X" was chosen so it would not sound like "Dear Ex," as if addressed to an ex-girlfriend.

== Music video ==
The music video for the single "Dear X (You Don't Own Me"" was released on May 20, 2013.

== Charts ==
Chart (2010)	Peak position
US Christian Airplay (Billboard)	30
US Christian Rock (Billboard)	1
US Hot Christian Songs (Billboard)	30
