= Write This Down (band) =

American Christian rock band

- Origin: Minneapolis, Minnesota
- Genres: Post-hardcore, Christian rock, hard rock, screamo
- Years active: 2005–present
- Labels: Tooth & Nail
- Members: Nate Rockwell; Chad Nichols; Nick Lombardo; Mike Kuwica
- Past members: Johnny Collier; Andy Kalyvas; Jon Oberbeck; Jared Kocka; Aaron Rockwell
- Website: Write This Down on Myspace

Write This Down is an American Christian rock band from Minneapolis, Minnesota. Formed in 2005, the band consists of vocalists and guitarists Nate Rockwell and Mike Kuwica, bassist Nick Lombardo and drummer Chad Nichols. Their music has been featured on Internet-based radio stations, receiving regular rotation on RadioU and ChristianRock.Net. On May 10, 2010, their album, Write This Down, peaked at No. 45 on Billboard's Christian Albums chart.

== History ==
The band was formed in 2005 and, after several line-up changes, the band consisted of Johnny Collier, Andy Kalyvas, Chad Nichols, Jon Oberbeck and Nate Rockwell. The name came after a song on pop-punk band Cartel's The Ransom EP. In 2007, Write This Down released two self-produced EPs. Although their first EP is titled Alarm the Alarm, the original version of the song "Alarm the Alarm" does not appear on this recording. It is released on the Write This Down EP, which was released on September 3, 2007.

After releasing two independent EPs, Write This Down signed to Tooth & Nail Records to record their first full-length studio album. Oberbeck and Kalyvas left the band prior to recording the album. Since then they have added Nick Lombardo and Mike Kuwica to the lineup. Their self-titled album, Write This Down, was released on April 20, 2010.

A second album, Lost Weekend, was released on May 22, 2012. After extensive touring, Johnny Collier decided to leave the band for personal reasons. However, they announced that they're working on a five-track EP and "hopefully a full length to shortly follow". On November 24, 2015, Write This Down self-released their third EP, Foundations, making it the first release without Johnny Collier.

== Band members ==
Current

- Chad Nichols – drums (since 2005)
- Nate Rockwell – guitar, vocals (since 2005)
- Mike Kuwica – guitar, vocals (since 2011)
- Nick Lombardo - bass (since 2009)

Former

- Johnny Collier – lead vocals (2005-2014)
- Jared Kocka – guitar (2008-2010)
- Andy Kalyvas – bass (2005–2009)
- Aaron Rockwell – guitar (2007-2008)
- Jon Oberbeck – guitar (2005–2007)

== Discography ==
Studio albums

Released	Title	Label
April 20, 2010	Write This Down	Tooth & Nail Records
June 5, 2012	Lost Weekend	Tooth & Nail Records

EPs

Released	Title	Label
February 2, 2007	Alarm the Alarm	(independent)
September 3, 2007	Write This Down	(independent)
November 24, 2015	Foundations	(independent)

Singles

Year	Title	Chart Peak	Album
Year	Title	Christian Rock	Album
2010	"Renegade"	—	Write This Down
2010	"Alarm the Alarm"	3	Write This Down
2010	"Hand Grenades"	1	Write This Down
2010	"Center of Attention"	2	Write This Down
