= Scars Remain =

Studio album by Disciple
- Released: November 7, 2006
- Genre: Christian metal, hard rock, alternative metal
- Length: 38:54
- Label: INO
- Producer: Travis Wyrick

Disciple chronology
Disciple (2005)	Scars Remain (2006)	Southern Hospitality (2008)

Scars Remain is the sixth album by Christian metal group Disciple, released November 7, 2006.

== Track listing ==
All tracks are written by Disciple

No.	Title	Length
1.	"Regime Change"	3:54
2.	"Love Hate (On and On)"	3:33
3.	"My Hell"	3:35
4.	"Scars Remain"	4:31
5.	"Game On"	3:26
6.	"Someone"	3:20
7.	"After the World"	3:36
8.	"Dive"	3:13
9.	"Fight for Love"	2:40
10.	"Purpose to Melody"	3:38
11.	"No End at All"	3:28
Total length:		38:54

Special edition
No.	Title	Length
12.	"Things Left Unsaid"	3:52
13.	"Love Hate (On and On) (Acoustic)"	4:04
14.	"After the World (Acoustic)"	3:58
15.	"My Hell (Acoustic)"	4:13
16.	"Things Left Unsaid (Acoustic)"	4:11
Total length:		20:18

== Reception ==
Professional ratings
Review scores
Source	Rating
AllMusic	2.5/5 stars
Jesus Freak Hideout	4/5 stars

The Album peaked at No. 118 on the Billboard top 200, No. 9 on Christian Albums and No. 1 on Heatseaker albums when it was released.

== Awards ==
In 2008, the album won a Dove Award for Rock Album of the Year at the 39th GMA Dove Awards. The song "After the World" was also nominated for Rock/Contemporary Recorded Song of the Year.

== Trivia ==
- "Game On" was the theme song for WWE Cyber Sunday 2006.
- On the iTunes Music Store there is a remix of "Game On" for all NFL Football Teams.
