= Disciple (band) =

American Christian metal band

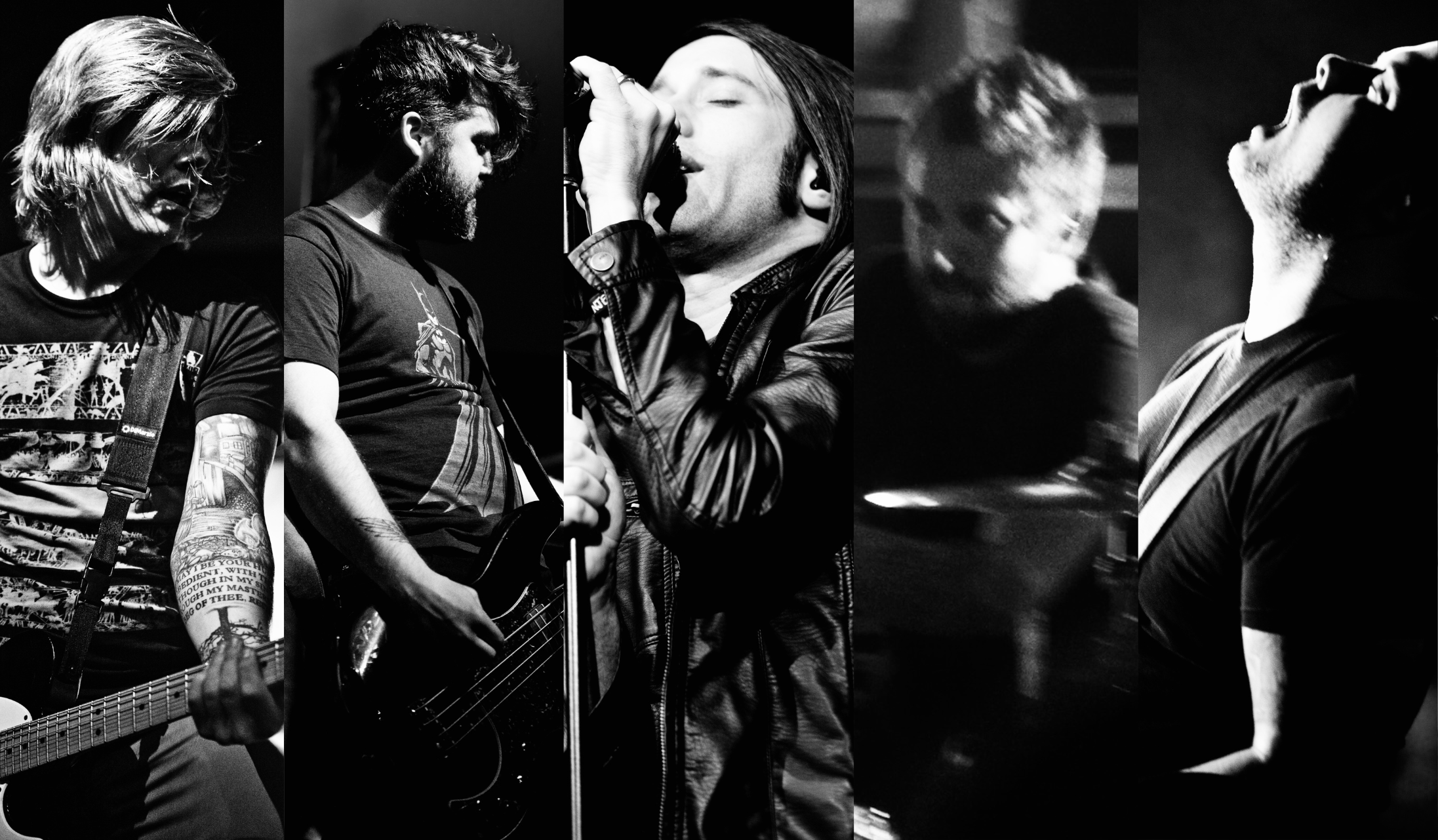
- Disciple in 2011: From left to right: Micah Sannan, Israel Beachy, Kevin Young, Trent Reiff, and Andrew Welch

Background information
- Origin: Knoxville, Tennessee, U.S.
- Genres: Christian metal, hard rock, alternative metal
- Years active: 1992–present
- Labels: Slain, Rugged, INO, Tooth & Nail
- Members: Kevin Young; Josiah Prince; Joey West; Andrew Stanton; Dane Allen
- Past members: Trent Reiff; Adrian DiTommasi; Brad Noah; Joey Fife; Andrew Welch; Tim Barrett; Micah Sannan; Israel Beachy; Jason Wilkes; Jeremy Spurlin
- Website: disciplerocks.com

Disciple is an American Christian metal band from Knoxville, Tennessee, active in recording and performing since their formation in 1992. The group has released 13 studio albums, three extended plays, one live extended play, and one compilation album.

== History ==
=== Early releases (1992–1998) ===
Disciple was formed in December 1992 by Knoxville high school friends Kevin Young, Brad Noah, Adrian DiTommasi and Tim Barrett. The band played its first show in May 1993 at Topside Church of God in Louisville, Tennessee, and recorded its first three-song demo at Nightsong Studios with producer Jesse Jones. Adrian DiTommasi left the band shortly after that for personal reasons, and Kevin Young would eventually take over the bass guitar duties. Later that year, Jones led Disciple in recording its first full-length album, titled Trail of Tears, at Nightsong Studios. In 1994 the band with Jones recorded a second album, Lake of Fire.

In late 1995, Disciple released What Was I Thinking on their own independent label Slain Records. The album was produced by Travis Wyrick, former guitar player of the band Sage. It was the first Disciple album available on CD in addition to cassette. In 1996, the band performed a show at the Electric Ballroom in Knoxville which sparked talks between the band and Jeff Lysyczyn of Warner Bros.

In 1997, Disciple signed with Warner Resound Records and on October 27, 1997, released a five-song EP, My Daddy Can Whip Your Daddy, produced by Jeff Lysyczyn and Travis Wyrick. The band began touring in December 1997 and had their first No. 1 Rock Radio single on the Jamsline Rock Chart with the song "Fill My Shoes".

In 1998, Disciple signed with Rugged Records with whom they released the album, This Might Sting a Little on June 1, 1999. This album garnered them two GMA Dove Award nominations and two No. 1 Christian rock hit songs with "I Just Know" and "Big Bad Wolf". "I Just Know" was the most played song of 1999 on the Albuquerque, New Mexico, Christian radio station, KLYT, now known as Star 88.

=== Later works (2000–2013) ===
The band released their third studio album, By God, on February 6, 2001, which went on to win the Inspirational Life Award in 2001 and earned them two No. 1 Christian rock hits with the songs "By God" and "God of Elijah", and two Dove Awards nominations.

The band released Back Again on February 25, 2003, on their own record label, Slain Records; it was produced by Travis Wyrick in his Knoxville studio. It earned two No. 1 Christian rock hits with the songs "Back Again" and "Wait". In a review for Cross Rhythms, David Cranson described the album's musical style as a mix of "Rage Against The Machine, Bride, Metallica, P.O.D. styles with Luke Easter (Tourniquet) cum Kelly Jones (Stereophonics) vocals", and gave it 9/10. Kevin Young agreed with the album being called the band's Back in Black album in a 2008 radio interview with The Full Armor of God Broadcast. Comparing the band's 2019 album Love Letter Kill Shot to the band's past output, Christopher Smith of Jesusfreakhideout.com cites Back Again as an example of the band's heavier sound. In October 2003 Disciple added bassist Joey Fife to the trio.

Disciple signed with INO Records and released their self-titled Disciple on June 7, 2005. This album featured three No. 1 Christian rock hits with the songs "The Wait Is Over", "Into Black", and "Rise Up", and two Dove Awards nominations. "The Wait Is Over" was the most-played Christian rock song of 2005.

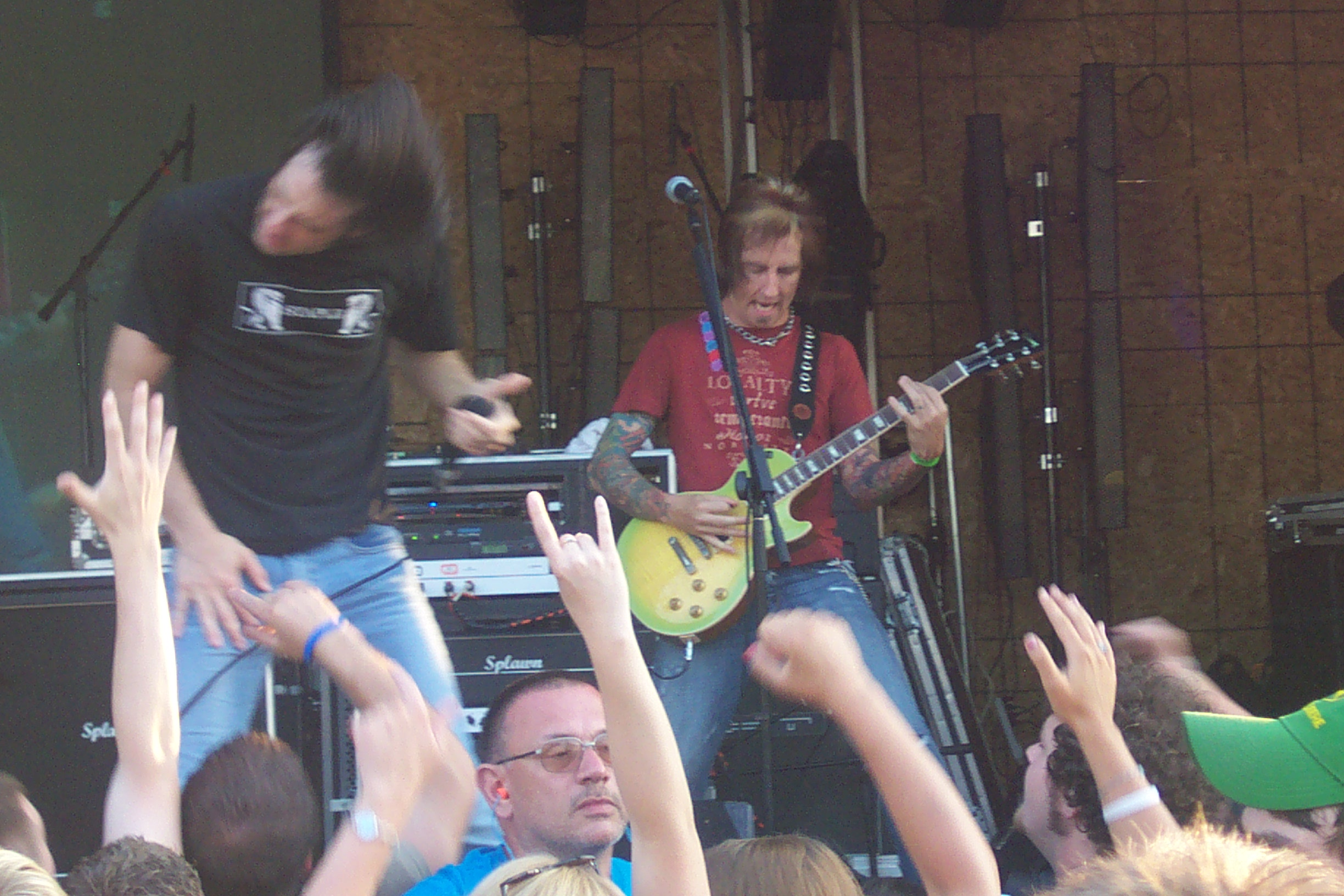
Disciple performing in 2007

They released Scars Remain on November 7, 2006. The song "After the World" was the eighth most played song on Christian Hit Radio stations in 2007 and was the band's first Christian CHR Radio No. 1 Hit. Scars Remain, the album, has so far earned one Christian rock No. 1 with the song "Love Hate (On and On)" and two Dove Awards nominations. Scars Remain won the Dove Award for Rock Album of the Year, and was the band's first Dove Award win.

On January 8, 2008, Young announced in a "Disciple: The Alliance" email that Noah and Fife were stepping down as band members. However, Young said that Noah "decided to still be a part of the songwriting process and even play on the recordings." He also mentioned that "the songs that [Brad Noah] has been writing for the new Disciple project are somewhere between hard rock and southern rock." Also in that announcement was the addition of two new band members, Andrew Welch on guitar, and Israel Beachy on bass. With a new line-up, Disciple set off on the Cross the Line Tour with Superchick in March 2008. In April 2008, the band also announced the addition of Micah Sannan on guitar as well.

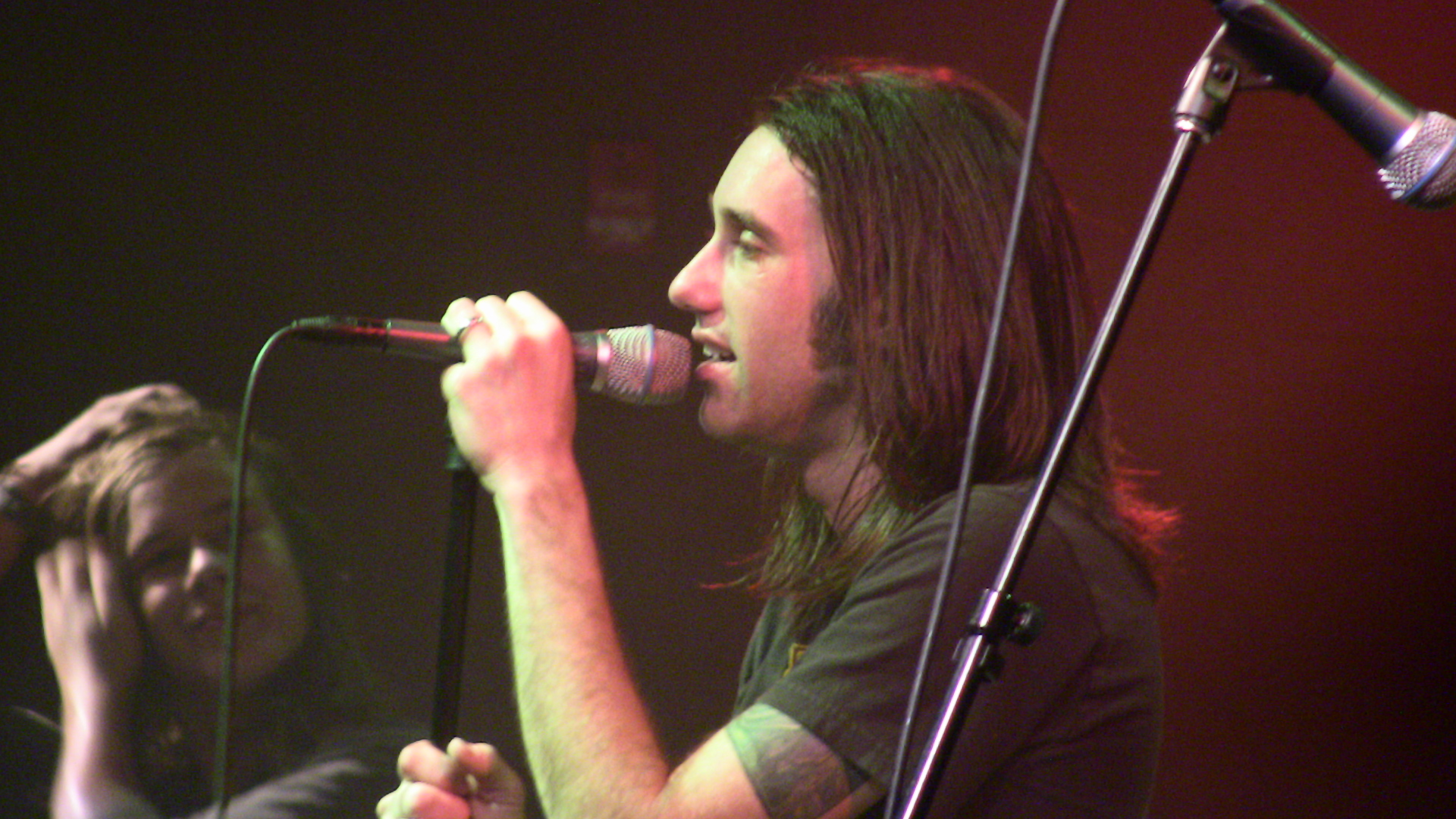
Lead singer Kevin Young in concert performing with Disciple in 2009

They released Southern Hospitality on October 21, 2008. Southern Hospitality earned the Dove Award nomination for Rock Album of the Year, and had a No. 1 Rock Hit with the song "Romance Me". Also in 2008, the band appeared on WWE The Music, Vol. 8, providing the track "In the Middle of It Now" as the entrance theme for wrestlers Curt Hawkins and Zack Ryder.

On April 28, 2010, Disciple announced a new album, Horseshoes and Hand Grenades, on RadioU which was released on September 14. It was produced by Rob Hawkins, although the band re-recorded the album's lead single, "Dear X (You Don't Own Me)", with Howard Benson. They also revealed that they are accompanying Thousand Foot Krutch on their Welcome to the Masquerade tour, and afterwards tour with RED on their Nothing & Everything tour. They also had a tour with Ivoryline and Emery. They had their headline Rules of Engagement Tour with Project 86 and Write this Down in early 2011. Later, they joined Kutless and Newsboys on the Born Again Experience tour. They joined Skillet for their Awake and Alive Tour in late 2011. Trent Reiff officially joined the band on drums during the final stages of the Horseshoes and Handgrenades recordings sessions in early 2010 after the original drummer Tim Barrett's departure from the band.

O God Save Us All was released on November 13, 2012, with Fair Trade Services (formerly INO Records) and was produced by Jasen Rauch, formerly of the band Red, with the first single, "Draw the Line", released on August 14 on iTunes. Lead guitarist Andrew Welch left the band in mid-September (Welch now plays for Thousand Foot Krutch). In November 2012 the band hosted a live video stream for the album release show in Nashville, Tennessee featuring Rich Ward of Stuck Mojo and Fozzy. Despite rumors of Ward joining Disciple full-time, Ward responded to a tweet asking if he was still with Disciple, "No, I just played the album release show with them. I love those guys." Micah Sannan and Israel Beachy amicably left the band in December 2012, and were replaced by Josiah Prince, formerly of Philmont on guitar, and Jason Wilkes, former vocalist for High Flight Society, on bass guitar. Disciple did a co-Headlining tour with Fireflight in January and February 2013 called the Save Us Now Tour. I Am Empire guitarist Andrew Stanton, who would become a full member later in the year, began touring with the band in early 2013.

=== Independent (2014–2018) ===
In early 2014, Disciple launched a Kickstarter campaign to fund their new album, which was to be recorded and released independently. The campaign was a huge success, setting a goal of $45,000 and ending with a total pledged amount of $115,852. For this project, the band returned to producer Travis Wyrick, who produced the first seven Disciple albums. The album, titled Attack, was released on September 23 worldwide. This was Disciple's first album to feature members Josiah Prince, Jason Wilkes (former frontman of High Flight Society), Andrew Stanton, and Joey West (who refer to the current lineup as "Disciple 3.0"). The band went on to tour alongside Decyfer Down, Nine Lashes, and Seventh Day Slumber on the City Rockfest tour of 2015.

On March 31, 2015, it was announced that Wilkes had made the decision to step down from the band in order to support his family. He left the band after the last show of the City Rockfest tour, on April 11, 2015. On September 25, 2015, Disciple released their Vultures EP, which consists of songs that didn't make their previous album, Attack, and also included songwriting credits by former member Jason Wilkes, though he did not perform on the EP.

On July 21, 2016, Disciple announced the release of a new live EP, called "Live in Denmark", which was made available for free digital download.

On August 3, 2016, Disciple launched a second Kickstarter campaign to fund their eleventh album, Long Live the Rebels. The campaign ended on September 12, 2016, outperforming their previous Kickstarter with 2,012 people raising $127,675 for the album. The backers were given two brand new Disciple tracks immediately following called "Erase" and "Underdog Fight Song." On September 23, 2016, it was announced that Disciple would be partnering with Tooth & Nail Records for the release of Long Live the Rebels. The album was released on October 14, 2016.

On September 29, 2018, it was announced that guitarist Andrew Stanton had made the decision to step down from Disciple as a touring member to be at home for his family, though he would still be involved with the band in the future and contribute in writing and recording their next album. On December 5, 2018, it was announced that Disciple would be accepting auditions and looking for fill-in guitarists to perform live shows throughout 2019 following Stanton's departure. On December 8, 2018, Stanton played his seemingly final show as a full-time member.

=== Tooth & Nail Records (2018–present) ===
On December 14, 2018, it was announced that Disciple had signed to Tooth & Nail Records for the release of their 2019 album, Love Letter Kill Shot, following the release of four singles (listed in no particular order), "Cuff The Criminal", "Reanimate", "Play to Win", and "Panic Room", the latter featuring Andrew Schwab, vocalist for American rock band Project 86. The album was released on September 13, 2019. On September 18, 2020, the band released a deluxe edition of the album, featuring three new tracks that originally didn't make the album: "Darkness Dies", "Enemy", and "Kingdom Come".

On July 7, 2021, it was announced that Andrew Stanton would return to the band as a full-time touring and studio musician. The band also began a worship side project titled Honor & Glory, releasing two singles in 2021 for the side project's debut self-titled album, "Battle Belongs" and "God of My Story". The side project issued their album on March 18, 2022.

On July 22, 2022, the band's vocalist Kevin Young collaborated with Trampolines and Legin to release the track "Amen To That". Later, on December 2, 2022, Kutless released a new single, "End of the World", as a collaboration with Disciple.

On January 13, 2023, the band released their first single in three years, "The Executioner", with an accompanying music video, to announce their new album, Skeleton Psalms. Later, on February 1, the band released a second single that had previously been debuted at live performances and was part of their setlist at Winter Jam 2023, "Promise to Live". The group released the album's final single, "Bad Words", on March 30, 2023. Skeleton Psalms was released a month later on April 28, 2023.

On August 23, 2024, Disciple released a single dual-credited with Honor & Glory: a cover of "Firm Foundation (He Won't)". On September 27, they proceeded to unveil their latest single "If You Say So", after appearing at the 2024 CVJM Loud and Proud Festival in Germany and sharing the stage with Petra for their song "Beyond Belief".

On November 10, 2024, the band announced that their rendition of "Firm Foundation" was selected as nominee in the 2025 Grammy Awards for Best Contemporary/Christian Performance/Song. On February 28, the band released a new single, titled "Sound the Alarm".

On March 28, the band released a new version of the Skeleton Psalms track "Resurrecting Reasons" featuring TJ Harris from Decyfer Down, along with an official music video. The band began touring alongside Decyfer Down on April 25 for the Resurrecting Reasons Tour to commemorate the collaboration. That same day, they released the deluxe edition of Skeleton Psalms, featuring an acoustic version of "Promise to Live," their three previously released singles, two new tracks, and five new live recordings.

On May 18th, 2026, the band released a music video for the song "Bow Down" from Skeleton Psalms, while also announcing longtime touring bassist Dane Allen as a new member.

== Members ==
Current

- Kevin Young – lead vocals, acoustic guitar (1992–present), bass (1993–2003, 2015–2026)
- Andrew Stanton – lead guitar, backing vocals (2012–present)
- Josiah Prince – rhythm guitar, piano, backing vocals (2012–present)
- Joey West – drums (2013–present)
- Dane Allen - bass, backing vocals (touring member 2020–2026, 2026–present)

Touring

- Josh Kincheloe – bass (2015)
- Micah Labrosse - guitar (2019)
- John Panzer – guitar (2019–2021)
- Marco Pera – bass, backing vocals (2019–2024)
- Marshall Huffman – drums (2024)

Former

- Adrian DiTommasi – bass (1992–1993)
- Brad Noah – lead and rhythm guitar (1992–2008)
- Joey Fife – bass, backing vocals (2003–2008)
- Tim Barrett – drums (1992–2010)
- Andrew Welch – lead guitar (2008–2012)
- Israel Beachy – bass (2008–2012)
- Micah Sannan – rhythm guitar (2008–2012), lead guitar (2012)
- Trent Reiff – drums (2010–2013)
- Jason Wilkes – bass, backing vocals (2012–2015)
- Jeremy Spurlin – lead guitar (2001–2005)

Timeline

== Discography ==
- What Was I Thinking (1995)
- This Might Sting a Little (1999)
- By God (2001)
- Back Again (2003)
- Disciple (2005)
- Scars Remain (2006)
- Southern Hospitality (2008)
- Horseshoes & Handgrenades (2010)
- O God Save Us All (2012)
- Attack (2014)
- Long Live the Rebels (2016)
- Love Letter Kill Shot (2019)
- Skeleton Psalms (2023)

== Television ==
The song "Game On" was used for numerous television showings and commercials. These include the official theme song for WWE Cyber Sunday 2006, ESPN's NFL Live on November 1–2 during the plays of the month, Fox Sports' The Best Damn Sports Show Period, the NFL Network's Total Access show, Speed TV's The Speed Report, and as background music for CSI: Miami and Criminal Minds commercials.

In 2008, Disciple recorded a theme song for the Major Players tag team in WWE, "In the Middle of It Now". On February 1, 2008, the team (Curt Hawkins and Zack Ryder) entered SmackDown with the new song as their theme. This song was released exclusively on WWE The Music, Volume 8 on March 25, 2008. Hawkins and Ryder later did a "Superstar 2 Superstar" article interview with Disciple on WWE.com, where all parties revealed they were thrilled with how the song turned out. Curt Hawkins has continued to use "In the Middle of It Now" as his entrance song, and as of 2024 has not changed it.

== Dove Award nominations ==
- 2001 Hard Music Recorded Song of the Year for "By God"
- 2001 Hard Music Album of the Year for By God

GMA Dove Awards

Year	Award	Result
2000	Hard Music Album of the Year ("This Might Sting A Little")	Nominated
2000	Hard Music Recorded Song of the Year ("I Just Know")	Nominated
2001	Hard Music Album of the Year ("By God")	Nominated
2001	Hard Music Recorded Song of the Year ("By God")	Nominated
2006	Rock Album of the Year (Disciple)	Nominated
2006	Rock Recorded Song of the Year ("The Wait is Over")	Nominated
2008	Rock Album of the Year (Scars Remain)	Won
2008	Rock/Contemporary Recorded Song of the Year ("After the World")	Nominated
2009	Rock Album of the Year (Southern Hospitality)	Nominated
2011	Rock Album of the Year (Horseshoes & Handgrenades)	Won
2011	Rock Recorded Song of the Year ("Dear X (You Don't Own Me)")	Nominated
2012	Rock Recorded Song of the Year ("Invisible")	Nominated
2014	Rock Album of the Year (Attack)	Nominated
2020	Rock Album of the Year (Love Letter Kill Shot)	Nominated

We Love Awards

Year	Award	Result
2025	Rock / Alternative Song of the Year ("It is Finished")	Nominated
