= O God Save Us All =

Studio album by Disciple
- Released: November 13, 2012
- Genre: Christian metal, hard rock, alternative metal
- Length: 36:53
- Label: Fair Trade Services
- Producer: Jasen Rauch

Disciple chronology
Horseshoes & Handgrenades (2010)	O God Save Us All (2012)	Attack (2014)

Singles from O God Save Us All
- 1. "Draw the Line" Released: August 14, 2012; 2. "Once and for All"

O God Save Us All is the ninth studio album from Christian metal group Disciple released on November 13, 2012, in CD & Digital format. The first single released was the song "Draw The Line", which hit No. 45 in the Billboard Christian Songs chart. The album shares a Hard Rock sound, alike the albums Disciple and Back Again. It brings full energy in some of the songs, and has some soft-rock songs. The cover artwork features the Chi Rho image.

The album debuted No. 5 in the Billboard Christian Albums chart and No. 9 in the Hard Rock chart.

== History ==
The studio recording was announced in early 2012: "About to go into the studio to work on some new stuff. Who's ready for some new Disciple jams?!".

On April 2, it was posted that they will be writing some new songs because their "4thirty1" tour was canceled and they would have more time to record. Two months later, a picture was published in their Instagram account which showed the band members in a photo shoot in Nashville.

On September 21, it was announced that new pre-sales packages are coming soon. They also announced the end of 4 Nights Live In California video sales.

On September 30, the pre-sale packaging was released for download, which included three songs. The rest of the album was made available three days before its release. The pre-sale deal included "Draw the Line", "O God Save Us All", and "Outlaws".

== Promotion and release ==
Days after the disc announcement, six Pre-Sale packages were available, Package "A", "B", "C", "D", "E," and the "Ultimate Fan" package Each Pre-Sale Pack included the digital download, but the biggest pack included a phone call from the band's leader Kevin Young, the Digital Download, the CD signed, a hat and a shirt exclusive between other things. The Pre-Sale packagings were available for three weeks, and all of them, had a special cost for a Live Stream Concert, made the night before the album releasing. Disciple also made a "Release Party", to celebrate the new album release worldwide.

== Critical reception ==
Professional ratings
Review scores
Source	Rating
Alt Rock Live	8/10 stars
CCM Magazine	4/5 stars
Christian Music Zine	4/5 stars
Cross Rhythms	9/10 stars
Indie Vision Music	4/5 stars
Jesus Freak Hideout	4/5 stars 3.5/5 stars
Louder Than The Music	4/5 stars
New Release Tuesday	4.5/5 stars
The New Review	2.5/5 stars
Worship Leader	4/5 stars

Alt Rock Live's Jonathan Faulkner noted that " Musically there's something for every generation of Disciple fans" because "The instrumentation may also surprise some long time listeners" showing that "Lyrically Disciple continues to age like a fine wine." Faulkner wrote that "...with the release of O God Save Us All Kevin Young and Disciple have once again proven their staying power." Faulkner concluded with saying that "If you're looking for both a powerful and moving addition to your music collection look no further than Disciples latest O God Save Us All. It should keep old fans satisfied and draw in new and make a good addition to any collection."

CCM Magazine's Matt Conner wrote that "From the lead riffs of 'Outlaws' to the emotional pomp of 'Draw the Line,' Disciple is clearly a band that's found its groove."

Christian Music Zine's Tyler Hess said that "Now, after all these years, with new members, they have finally released the album that actually sounds like a successor to 2005′s Disciple, adding a little bit of the radio friendliness from their most recent release, in the form of O God Save Us All." Hess wrote that he had "...to admit that I’d much rather hear the more aggressive side of Disciple than the ballads, but there isn’t a bad track on the album, even if it’s on the softer side as a whole. They know what works for them and what their audience wants, if you’re cool with it not having the edginess of the old days, then O God Save Us All will make your ears happy."

Cross Rhythms' Stephen Luff wrote that "All in all, there are tracks here which will stick with you well after the CD finishes."

Indie Vision Music's Lee Brown said that "Disciple has been around for a while. Because of this, it’s hard for anything they do now to feel completely unique. That being said, if O God Save Us All is more of the same, it’s more of the same done better. The album really shines in Disciple’s discography for several of the following reasons. First of all, the message of the album is laid out like a story that unfolds with each new chapter. The music is balanced and the flow of the album is very well done. There is a nice mix of radio-friendly, ballad, and too-hard-for-radio screaming. Plus, it doesn’t hurt that a song or two feel a little bit like Disciple’s great This Might Sting a Little album."

Jesus Freak Hideout's Michael Weaver said that "Since 2008, the band has undergone extensive line-up changes that has left only singer Kevin Young as the sole original member still standing. Despite these changes, Disciple has continued to release solid hard rock records. Their newest effort, O God Save Us All, is no exception, but is, however, a bit of a mixed bag. Half of the record feels like the energizing hard rock found of their self-titled album, as well as Scars Remain, while the other half feels more like the same modern rock heard all over the radio. Thankfully, Disciple is able to pull that radio rock sound off better than most." Weaver concluded with saying "Kevin Young's current Disciple doesn't necessarily hit it out of the park, but they do manage to maintain the norm. When the norm is crafting solid rock records with great replay value, 'maintaining the norm' isn't such a bad thing; it's no wonder Disciple has been around so long...Fans of harder rock than typically played on the radio, and fans of radio rock alike, can find common ground on this record. O God Save Us All probably won't end up as the favorite album of most fans, but it still contains plenty of material to whet your hard rock appetite."

Jesus Freak Hideout's Kevin Hoskins said that the band "continues to rock stages year after year. I feel like I say that with every release, which is impressive since they've been around for almost two decades now. So, what's one to expect from 'O God Help Us All?' Exactly the same Disciple as always: some solid hard rock tunes mixed with a healthy dose of ballads. Though it may not carry the lyrical depth or stellar musical creativity of other acts, it can keep your head bobbing all day long." Hoskins wrote that "In the end, this is what Disciple is known for. Is it going to be played all over Christian rock stations? Absolutely. But will it be the most mind-blowing album you've heard this year? Definitely not. Fans of Disciple will not be disappointed, but I don't except the band to garner any new attention with this release."

Louder Than The Music's Jono Davies said that "If you're looking for some hard hitting rock, then look no further than Disciple and their new album 'O God Save Us All'. The album includes some amazing co-writes with contributors like Ben Glover (Brandon Heath, Lee Brice) and Seth Mosley (Newsboys)." Davies finished by saying that "This album from Disciple is a very admirable album, there are some great songs on here that have such energy to them that I'm sure all hard rock fans will appreciate. Overall this is a very solid and exciting release from Disciple."

New Release Tuesday's Mary Burklin said that the album contains "a fresh set of tunes that draws heavily on both old roots and more recent conventions to create the bleakly titled opus O God Save Us All." In concluding, Burklin wrote that "O God Save Us All is a dynamic collection of hard rock hymns, showcasing Disciple's ability to create both raw anthems and symphonic ballads. As the title would imply, it is an album for the fight, a collection of songs for the wanderers seeking to step more fully into the new identity of hope defined by Jesus. This is a project well worth picking up for both dedicated Disciple listeners and rock fans looking for a solid hard rock record that hasn't been watered down. The album offers enough of the familiarity of the band's past style to satisfy dedicated listeners while refusing to settle for status quo, pushing on instead to craft fresh intricate riffs and vibrant lyrics that make this album stand distinct."

The New Reviews' Jonathan Anderson wrote that "...I cannot justify giving O God Save Us All anything more than an average rating. It does enough, however, keep my hope from being lost with Disciple. My fingers are crossed for their next album."

Worship Leader's Jay Akins said that "Disciple has delivered a well-crafted, hard-hitting, Christ-centered rock album. Many of the songs on this record have themes of repentance and redemption, calling the listener to surrender all they are to God and follow him with reckless abandon. Any of these songs would work well for a walk-in/walk-out mix for a youth service or contemporary venue." In closing, Akins wrote that "All in all this is a solid record that definitely continues Disciple’s long-standing reputation of creating great rock music that edifies the Church and draws listeners to a hope they can only find in Christ."

== Track listing ==
No.	Title	Writer(s)	Length
1.	"Outlaws"	Kevin Young, Jasen Rauch, Seth Mosley, Andrew Welch, Israel Beachy	3:32
2.	"O God Save Us All"	Trent Reiff, Rauch, Young, Stacy Hogan, Beachy, Welch	3:18
3.	"R.I.P."	Rob Hawkins, Young	2:48
4.	"Once and for All"	Mosley, Young	3:34
5.	"Someday"	Ben Glover, Rauch, Mark Holman, Young, Welch	3:50
6.	"Draw the Line"	Glover, Young, Mosley	3:24
7.	"Kings"	Reiff, Rauch, Young, Welch, Beachy	2:54
8.	"Unstoppable"	Reiff, Rauch, Micah Sannan, Beachy, Young	2:37
9.	"The One"	Welch, Rauch, Young, Reiff, Matt Arcaini	3:02
10.	"Beautiful Scars"	David Garcia, Rauch, Glover, Young	4:00
11.	"Trade a Moment"	Young, Beachy, Welch, Sannan, Reiff	3:54
Total length:			36:53

== Credits ==
(Source Discogs.com)

- Kevin Young - vocals
- Andrew Welch - lead guitar
- Micah Sannan - rhythm guitar
- Israel Beachy - bass guitar
- Trent Reiff - drums

Production

- Jasen Rauch - producer, engineering, digital editing
- Seth Mosley - digital editing, production, mixing
- Ainslie Grosser - mixing
- David McNair - mastering
- Buckley Miller - engineering
- Robert Venable - engineering
- Joe Rickard - digital editing
- Brandon Thigpen - digital editing, assistant engineering
- Matt Arcaini - programming, digital editing
- Travis Terrell - string arranger
- Dave Hagen - digital editing, engineering
- David Henry - engineering
- Micah Sannan - engineering

Additional musicians

- Jasen Rauch - keyboards, programming
- Seth Mosley - additional guitars
- David Henry - viola, cello
- Ross Homles - violin
- Dana Salsede - creative director
- James Rueger - A&R
- Cara Fox - cello

== Charts ==
Chart (2012)	Peak position
US Billboard 200	98
US Top Christian Albums (Billboard)	5
US Top Rock Albums (Billboard)	32
US Top Hard Rock Albums (Billboard)	9
