= Horseshoes & Handgrenades (Disciple album) =

Studio album by Disciple
- Released: September 14, 2010
- Genre: Christian metal, hard rock, alternative metal
- Length: 42:19
- Label: INO
- Producer: Rob Hawkins

Disciple chronology
Southern Hospitality (2008)	Horseshoes & Handgrenades (2010)	O God Save Us All (2012)

Horseshoes & Handgrenades is the eighth album from Christian metal group Disciple. It was physically released on September 14, 2010, and digitally available from July 22, 2010 through their website. The first song they recorded for the album was "The Ballad of St. Augustine".

The album debuted at No. 50 on the Billboard 200. This is the first album to feature guitarist Andrew Welch, guitarist Micah Sannan, bassist Israel Beachy, and drummer Trent Reiff.

== Track listing ==
No.	Title	Writer(s)	Length
1.	"Dear X (You Don't Own Me)"	Ben Glover, Rob Hawkins, Kevin Young	3:34
2.	"Watch It Burn" (featuring Brad Noah)	Hawkins, Brad Noah, Young	2:58
3.	"Invisible"	Glover, Hawkins, Young	4:36
4.	"The Ballad of St. Augustine"	Israel Beachy, Micah Sannan, Andrew Welch, Young	4:17
5.	"Shot Heard 'Round the World"	Sannan, Young	3:23
6.	"Collision"	Hawkins, Young	3:00
7.	"Battle Lines"	Welch, Young	2:54
8.	"Remedy"	Beachy, Sannan, Young	3:33
9.	"Eternity"	Beachy, Young	3:49
10.	"Revolution: Now"	Sannan, Young	3:36
11.	"Deafening"	Jon Howard, Nick DePartee, Adam Agee, Young	3:31
12.	"Worth the Pain"	Beachy, Sannan, Hawkins, Young	4:03
Total length:			42:19

B-sides
No.	Title	Length
1.	"Comedy Tragedy"	3:36
2.	"Disasterpiece"	3:08
3.	"Forget Me Not"	3:13
4.	"Fear and Suffering"	2:40
5.	"Horseshoes and Handgrenades"	2:35
6.	"The Fury (Wreck Me)"	3:20
7.	"Remake"	3:08
Total length:		01:04:19

== Credits ==
- Kevin Young – vocals
- Andrew Welch – lead guitar
- Micah Sannan – rhythm guitar
- Israel Beachy – bass
- Trent Reiff – drums

Additional musicians

- Lester Estelle – additional drums

Production (sources: Discogs.com, official liner notes)

- Rob Hawkins – producer, engineer
- Ben Grosse – mixing (track 1)
- Paul Pavao – mixing (tracks 2–12)
- Dan Shike – mastering
- Ben Phillips – drum engineering
- Dan Harding – design
- Dana Salsede – creative director

== Awards ==
The album won a Dove Award for Rock Album of the Year at the 42nd GMA Dove Awards, while the song "Dear X (You Don't Own Me)" was nominated for Rock Recorded Song of the Year.
