= Attack (Disciple album) =

Studio album by Disciple
- Released: September 23, 2014
- Genre: Christian metal; hard rock; alternative metal
- Length: 42:53
- Label: Independent
- Producer: Travis Wyrick

Disciple chronology
O God Save Us All (2012)	Attack (2014)	Vultures (2015)

Singles from Attack
- 1. "Radical" Released: July 22, 2014

Attack is the tenth studio album from Christian rock band Disciple. It was crowd-funded via a very successful Kickstarter campaign. The album was released on September 23, 2014. The first single "Radical" was released to radio and digitally on July 22, 2014.

== Composition ==
New Release Tuesday comments "Attack is built of ferocious guitar riffs, swelling melodies, searing vocals and a provoking and compelling declaration of the gospel that instantly sweeps the listener into spiritual awareness" with "abrasive hard rock grit to soothing melodic ballads". Indie Vision Music explains "Bringing anthemic battle-driven tracks that inspire while also positively uplifting the listener out of the mire of this world and offering them hope, this is an album that deserves to be internalized into your very soul." Jesus Freak Hideout contends "While all too many rock outfits are trading their chugging riffs for more modest melodies and radio-friendly cuts, it's exciting to hear a band like Disciple continuing on and just being themselves, all the while carrying the flag into battle in the name of Christ." Christian Music Review suggests "Disciple shares their bold passion for Christ with fast drumming, heavy guitars, strong bass, and intense screaming on their newest album, Attack. They offer plenty of hard-core musical interludes that will get your head banging." 365 Days of Inspiring Media discerns "Attack's rockers are great, but the lyrics are what sets the album apart."

== Critical reception ==
Professional ratings
Review scores
Source	Rating
365 Days of Inspiring Media	4/5 stars
About.com	4/5 stars
CCM Magazine	3/5 stars
Christian Music Review	4.5/5 stars
HM Magazine	4/5 stars
Indie Vision Music	4/5 stars
Jesus Freak Hideout	4.5/5 stars 3/5 stars
Jesus Wired	9.75/10
New Release Tuesday	4.5/5 stars

Signaling in a four star review by HM Magazine, Nate Lake recognizes, "From music to lyrics to album structure, Disciple's Attack backs up its already solid reputation with a quality set of powerful tracks that pushes the band's listeners to attack life in their own faith journeys." Matt Conner, indicating in a three star review from CCM Magazine, realizes, "unfortunately the new chemistry is a bit lacking. Attack is a straightforward rock release with hand's up anthems... and heartfelt anthems. Sound familiar? It should."

On behalf of Jesus Freak Hideout, Michael Weaver opines "Disciple is back in a big way with Attack. There really isn't much to pick apart... Attack should be in contention for best rock album of 2014." Kevin Hoskins suggests "They do not disappoint... It may very well be the best Disciple work to date, and is certainly one of the best albums I have heard all year." Mark Rice forecasts "There is very little to dislike about Attack,... nothing to get upset about." Scott Fryberger contends "Disciple's label tenure may be a little jolted by Attack, but this is still mostly an album for that particular fanbase". John DiBiase foretells "Attack is absolutely refreshing and couldn't have come too soon."

Writing for New Release Tuesday, Mary Nikkel foresees "This album is one of the strongest of Disciple's career, promising to be an instant favorite with the fans who made it possible... Despite the lineup revolution, this album has Disciple's identity stamped on it more firmly than perhaps ever before, lending the album momentum born of confidence and dedication to its message... this album is sure to claim a treasured spot in the collection of any hard rock fan." Lee Brown says for Indie Vision Music that "Attack is the best Disciple’s album of the latter decade of their career", and this "has more singularly great tracks than perhaps anything the band has ever produced."

On behalf of About.com, Kim Jones observes "Attack is authentic all the way." Writing at Christian Music Review, April Covington notices that "Disciple was able to slightly modernize the 90’s metal without sacrificing heaviness." Micah Garnett explains for 365 Days of Inspiring Media that "Attack’s unabashedly Christian message is what sets it apart from other bands in the market, but it’s backed by solid music and solid production... that Disciple is back and as good as ever." Stephanie Crail, writing for Jesus Wired, replies, "An absolute must have for fans of hard rock."

== Track listing ==
No.	Title	Writer(s)	Length
1.	"Radical"	Kevin Young, Josiah Prince, Andrew Stanton	3:56
2.	"Attack"	Young, Prince	3:07
3.	"Dead Militia"	Jason Wilkes, Prince, Young, Stanton	3:51
4.	"Scarlet"	Young, Prince, Wilkes, Stanton	3:47
5.	"Unbroken"	Young, Casey Brown	3:43
6.	"The Name"	Prince, Young	3:45
7.	"Angels & Demons"	Stanton, Prince, Young	2:52
8.	"Lion"	Wilkes, Young, Prince, Stanton	2:40
9.	"Yesterday Is Over"	Young, Prince	4:42
10.	"Kamikaze"	Young, Prince, Stanton, Andrew Welch, Trent Reiff	3:26
11.	"Crazy"	Stanton, Young, Prince	3:38
12.	"The Right Time"	Young, Prince	3:32
Total length:			42:53

== Personnel ==
- Kevin Young – lead vocals
- Jason Wilkes – bass guitar, backing vocals, co-lead vocals
- Andrew Stanton – lead guitar, backing vocals
- Josiah Prince – rhythm guitar, synthesizers, loops, backing vocals
- Joey West – drums, percussion

Production

- Travis Wyrick – producer, engineering
- Josiah Prince – engineering
- Mike Dearing – engineering
- Ainslie Grosser – mixing
- Dan Shike – mastering
- John Parker – cover design
- Lee Steffen – photography
- David Jane – package design

Additional musicians

- Colton Carnley – loops, synthesizers

== Charts ==
Chart (2014)	Peak position
US Billboard 200	44
US Christian Albums (Billboard)	2
US Top Hard Rock Albums (Billboard)	2
US Independent Albums (Billboard)	8
US Top Rock Albums (Billboard)	13
