= Travis Wyrick =

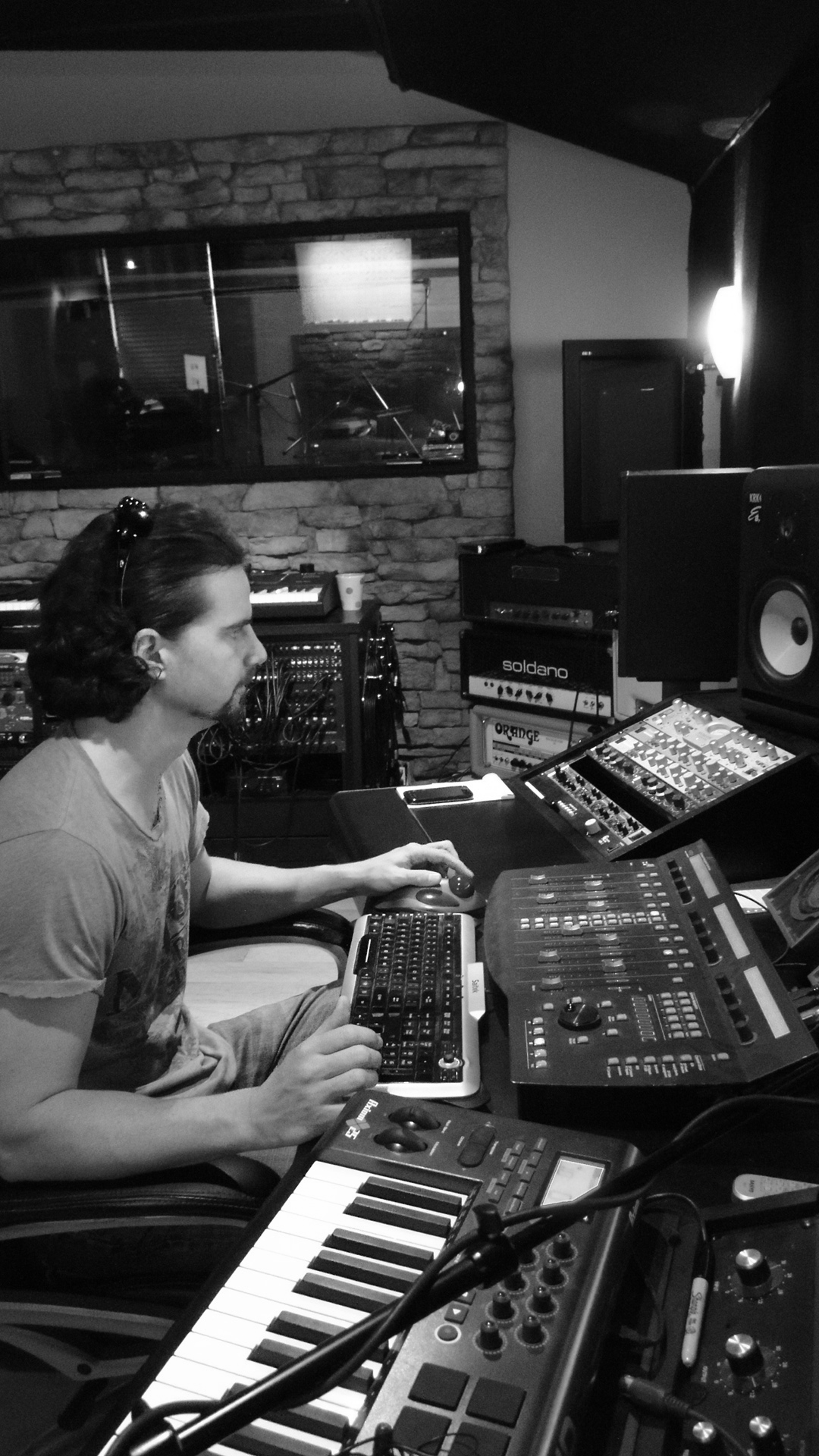
- Wyrick working in his studio

Background information
- Born: May 15, 1970 (age 54); Atlanta, Georgia, U.S.
- Genres: Rock, heavy metal, country, punk rock
- Occupation(s): Record producer, audio engineer, composer, mixer
- Instrument(s): guitar, bass, keyboards, piano
- Years active: 1990-present
- Website: www.wyrickmusic.com

Travis Wyrick is an American music producer and owner of Lakeside Studios in Knoxville, Tennessee. He is particularly known for his work with bands such as P.O.D., Pillar, 10 Years, Nine Lashes, and Disciple, and artists such as TobyMac and Dolly Parton. Throughout his career, he has produced over 30 No. 1 radio singles. Prior to becoming a producer, Wyrick was lead guitarist with the band Sage. In 1998, he released the industrial rock album Mental Floss under the mononym Wyrick. Two years later, he released Aggressive State... as the project's sophomore effort.

== Early years ==
From 1990-1994, Wyrick was the lead guitarist with hard rock band Sage. The band opened for acts such as Bon Jovi and Bad Company. They released two albums - Luv N' Lust in 1992 and State of Mind in 1994 before disbanding in 1994, when Wyrick "dedicated himself to his family, church, and production."

== Other work ==
Wyrick has worked with the country singer Dolly Parton on several occasions for various shows and other projects.

== Awards ==
Winner

- Dove Awards of 2001 for "Hard Music Album of the Year" - Above by Pillar
- Dove Awards of 2003 for "Hard Music Album of the Year" - Fireproof by Pillar
- Dove Awards of 2008 for "Rock Album of the Year" - Scars Remain by Disciple

Nomination

- 2008 Grammy Award Nominee for "Best Rock or Rap Gospel Album" for The Reckoning by Pillar
