= Spensha Baker =

American singer

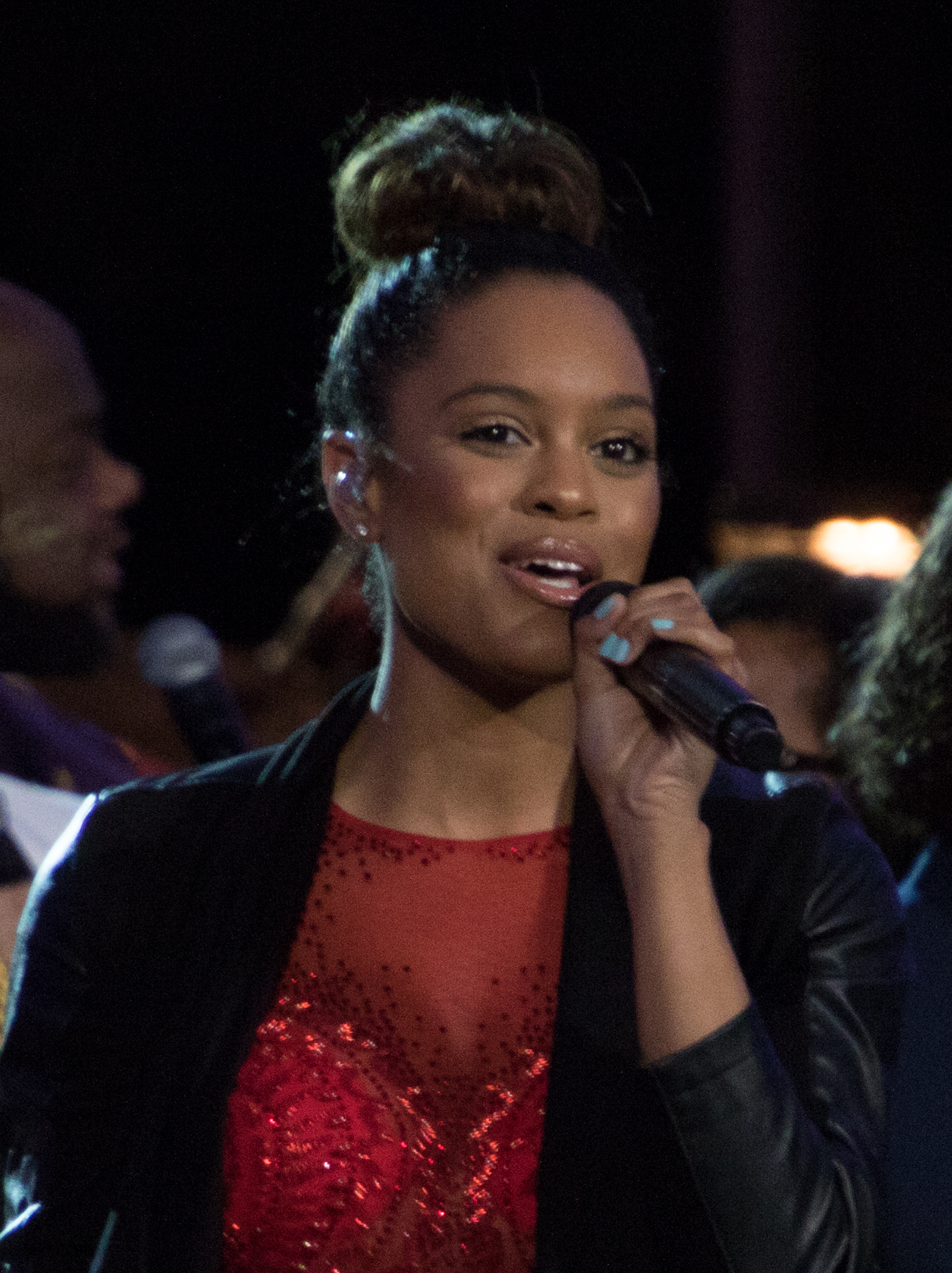
- Baker at the 2018 National Memorial Day Concert

Background information
- Born: Spensha Nicole Baker
- Genres: Country Urban gospel
- Occupations: Singer, songwriter
- Instrument: Voice
- Years active: 2004–present
- Labels: Independent
- Website: Official site

Spensha Nicole Baker is an American singer from San Antonio, Texas. She is best known for coming in fourth place on the fourteenth season of The Voice.

== Career ==
Spensha Baker started her singing career at a very young age as a 2004 contestant on Star Search. She performed at the White House for President George W. Bush.

She released her first album, Outloud!, explaining that she named it Outloud!, because "that is the way I live my life: Openly. I want to succeed and fail out loud. I want to laugh out loud, breathe out loud, love out loud, and live out loud. Not only is this my personal anthem, but I’m positive it can be an anthem for everyone. It's also the title track on my album.”

=== The Voice ===
Baker was a 2018 contestant on Season 14 of the American The Voice. She auditioned for the show in an episode broadcast on March 6, 2018 singing "Blackbird" by the Beatles. She earned chair turns from Kelly Clarkson and Blake Shelton and ultimately chose to be on Team Blake. In the Battles round, she was paired with Dallas Caroline with both singing "I Could Use a Love Song" by Maren Morris. Coach Shelton picked Baker to move to the Knockouts round. Spensha won the Knockout vs. Austin Giorgio and moved on to the Live Playoffs. Then during the Live Playoffs, she was chosen by her coach, Blake Shelton to move on to the Top 12. During the Top 12 week, Baker sang "Down on My Knees" by Trisha Yearwood, advancing through to the Top 11. During Top 11 week, Baker sang "Better Man" by Little Big Town, advancing through to the Top 10. During Top 10 week, Baker sang "Red" by Taylor Swift, advancing through to the semi-finals. In the semi-finals, Baker sang "My Church" by Maren Morris and a duet of "What's Going On" by Marvin Gaye and "Rise Up" by Andra Day with Kyla Jade. Her version of "My Church" reached #10 on iTunes, giving Baker an iTunes bonus multiplier, multiplying all of her iTunes votes by five. In the finals she was placed fourth behind Kyla Jade, Britton Buchanan, and Brynn Cartelli.

The Voice performances

– Studio version of performance reached the top 10 on iTunes

Stage	Song	Original artist	Order	Result
Blind Audition	"Blackbird"	The Beatles	6.1	Kelly Clarkson and Blake Shelton Turned; Joined Team Blake
Battle Rounds (Top 48)	"I Could Use a Love Song" (vs. Dallas Caroline)	Maren Morris	10.6	Saved by Coach
Knockout Rounds (Top 32)	"Broken Halos" (vs. Austin Giorgio)	Chris Stapleton	12.4	Saved by Coach
Live Playoffs (Top 24)	"I Still Believe in You"	Vince Gill	16.7	Not Chosen
Live Playoffs (Top 24)	"Smoke Break"	Carrie Underwood	17.1	Saved by Coach
Live Top 12	"Down on My Knees"	Trisha Yearwood	19.4	Saved by Public vote
Live Top 11	"Better Man"	Little Big Town	21.11	Saved by Public vote
Live Top 10	"Red"	Taylor Swift	23.5	Saved by Public vote
Live Semifinals (Top 8)	"What's Going On"/Rise Up (duet with Kyla Jade)	Marvin Gaye/ Andra Day	25.4	Saved by Public vote
Live Semifinals (Top 8)	"My Church"	Maren Morris	25.3	Saved by Public vote
Live Finals (Top 4)	"Tell Me About It" (with Blake Shelton)	Tanya Tucker feat. Delbert McClinton	27.7	4th Place
Live Finals (Top 4)	"Old Soul" (original song)	Spensha Baker	27.11	4th Place
Live Finals (Top 4)	"Merry Go' Round"	Kacey Musgraves	27.4	4th Place

== Discography ==
=== Albums ===
- 2008: OutLoud!

==== Singles ====
Year	Single	Peak positions			
Year	Single	US	US Digital	US Country	US Country Digital
2007	"Purpose"	—	—	—	—
2008	"Hallelujah"	—	—	—	—
2018	"Blackbird"	—	—	—	—
2018	"I Could Use a Love Song (with Dallas Caroline)"	—	—	—	—
2018	"Broken Halos"	—	—	—	—
2018	"I Still Believe In You"	—	—	—	—
2018	"Down on My Knees"	—	—	—	—
2018	"Better Man"	—	—	—	—
2018	"Red"	—	—	—	—
2018	"My Church"	—	—	—	21
2018	"Merry Go 'Round"	—	—	—	—
2018	"Tell Me About It (with Blake Shelton)"	—	—	—	—
2018	"Old Soul"	—	34	37	5
"—" denotes releases that did not chart
