= Out of the Blue (Brynn Cartelli album) =

Studio album by Brynn Cartelli
- Released: March 1, 2024
- Recorded: 2020–2024
- Genre: Pop
- Length: 49:00
- Label: Elektra
- Producer: Adam Argyle; Henrik Michelson; Keith Varon

Brynn Cartelli chronology
Based on a True Story (2021)	Out of the Blue (2024)

Singles from Out of the Blue
- 1. "Gemini" Released: May 20, 2022; 2. "Girl Code" Released: August 5, 2022; 3. "Convertible in the Rain" Released: November 4, 2022; 4. "Secondhand Smoke" Released: February 23, 2023; 5. "Lucky to Love You" Released: October 6, 2023; 6. "Boy From Home" Released: January 19, 2024

Out of the Blue is the debut studio album by American singer and season 14 winner of The Voice Brynn Cartelli. It was released on March 1, 2024, by Elektra Records. This follows the release of her debut EP Based on a True Story (2021).

== Background ==
She began working on the album in 2020, prior to the COVID-19 pandemic. A lot of the songs on the album about her transition from living at home to moving to New York. "Gemini" and "The Blue" were the first two songs written for the record. Billy Joel, Vampire Weekend, Lorde's Melodrama, and Taylor Swift's 1989 inspired her sonically for the album. The album was produced by Keith Varon, Adam Argyle and Henrik Michelson.

== Release and promotion ==
Out of the Blue was released on March 1, 2024, by Elektra Records. On March 1, 2024, Cartelli performed "The Blue" on the Today Show. "Boy From Home" was featured in the Netflix series Love Is Blind.

== Track listing ==
Out of the Blue track listing
No.	Title	Writer(s)	Producer(s)	Length
1.	"Beginning of the End"	Brynn Cartelli; Keith Varon	Varon	2:57
2.	"Gemini"	Cartelli; Henrik Michelson; Sophia Brenan	Michelson	3:11
3.	"Watching My Friends Fall in Love"	Cartelli; Adam Argyle	Varon	3:14
4.	"The Blue"	Cartelli; Michelson	Michelson	4:05
5.	"Secondhand Smoke"	Cartelli	Argyle	4:03
6.	"Running in Place"	Cartelli; Varon	Varon; Michelson	2:40
7.	"Girl Code"	Cartelli	Argyle	3:30
8.	"Convertible in the Rain"	Cartelli	Argyle	3:52
9.	"Lucky To Love You"	Cartelli; Varon; Michelson	Varon; Michelson	2:55
10.	"Fine Line"	Cartelli; Argyle	Argyle	3:14
11.	"Boy From Home"	Cartell	Argyle	3:50
12.	"Darker Days"	Cartelli	Argyle	4:26
13.	"Play With Fire"	Cartelli; Varon; Justin Vernon	Varon	3:09
14.	"Leader"	Cartelli	Argyle	3:48
Total length:				49:00
