= The Voice (American TV series) season 14 =

The Voice
- Season 14
- Promotional poster featuring Levine, Clarkson, Shelton, and Keys
- Hosted by: Carson Daly
- Coaches: Adam Levine; Alicia Keys; Kelly Clarkson; Blake Shelton
- No. of contestants: 48 artists
- Winner: Brynn Cartelli
- Winning coach: Kelly Clarkson
- Runner-up: Britton Buchanan
- No. of episodes: 28

Release
- Original network: NBC
- Original release: February 26 – May 22, 2018

Season chronology
- ← Previous; Season 13 Next → Season 15

The fourteenth season of the American reality television show The Voice premiered on February 26, 2018, on NBC. Adam Levine and Blake Shelton returned for their fourteenth season as coaches. Meanwhile, Alicia Keys returned for her third season after a one-season hiatus replacing Miley Cyrus, alongside new coach Kelly Clarkson replacing Jennifer Hudson.

This season featured two new elements: the Block, added during the Blind Auditions, allows the coaches to block one coach from getting an artist the coach turned around for. The Save, added during the Knockouts, allowed a coach to save an artist from elimination; However, if another coach also pressed their Steal button, the contestant could then decide whether they wanted to go to a new team or stay with their coach.

Brynn Cartelli was named the winner of the season, marking Kelly Clarkson's first win as a coach. At age 15, Cartelli became the youngest winner in the show's history surpassing Sawyer Fredericks and Danielle Bradbery at 16; Clarkson became the first new coach to win on her first attempt and the third female coach to win a season (being Alicia Keys and Christina Aguilera). Additionally, runner-up Britton Buchanan became the highest-placing artist who advanced via an Instant Save, following Joshua Davis of season 8 and Chris Jamison of season 7, who both placed third.

The fourteenth season was also notable when Levine selected Angel Bonilla, the first transgender contestant to turn a chair in the American version.

== Coaches and hosts ==
Coaches and Host of The Voice Season 14

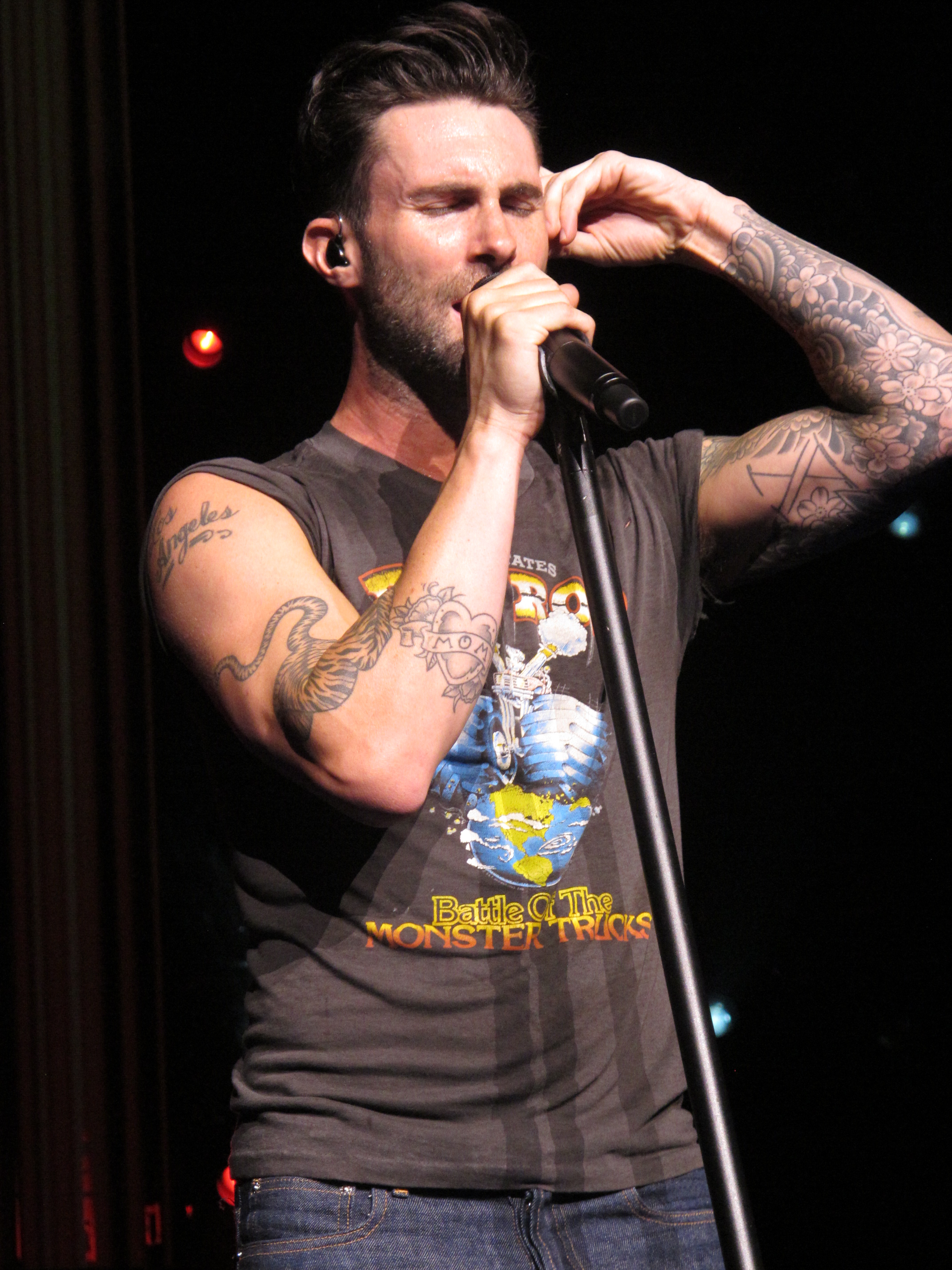
Adam Levine

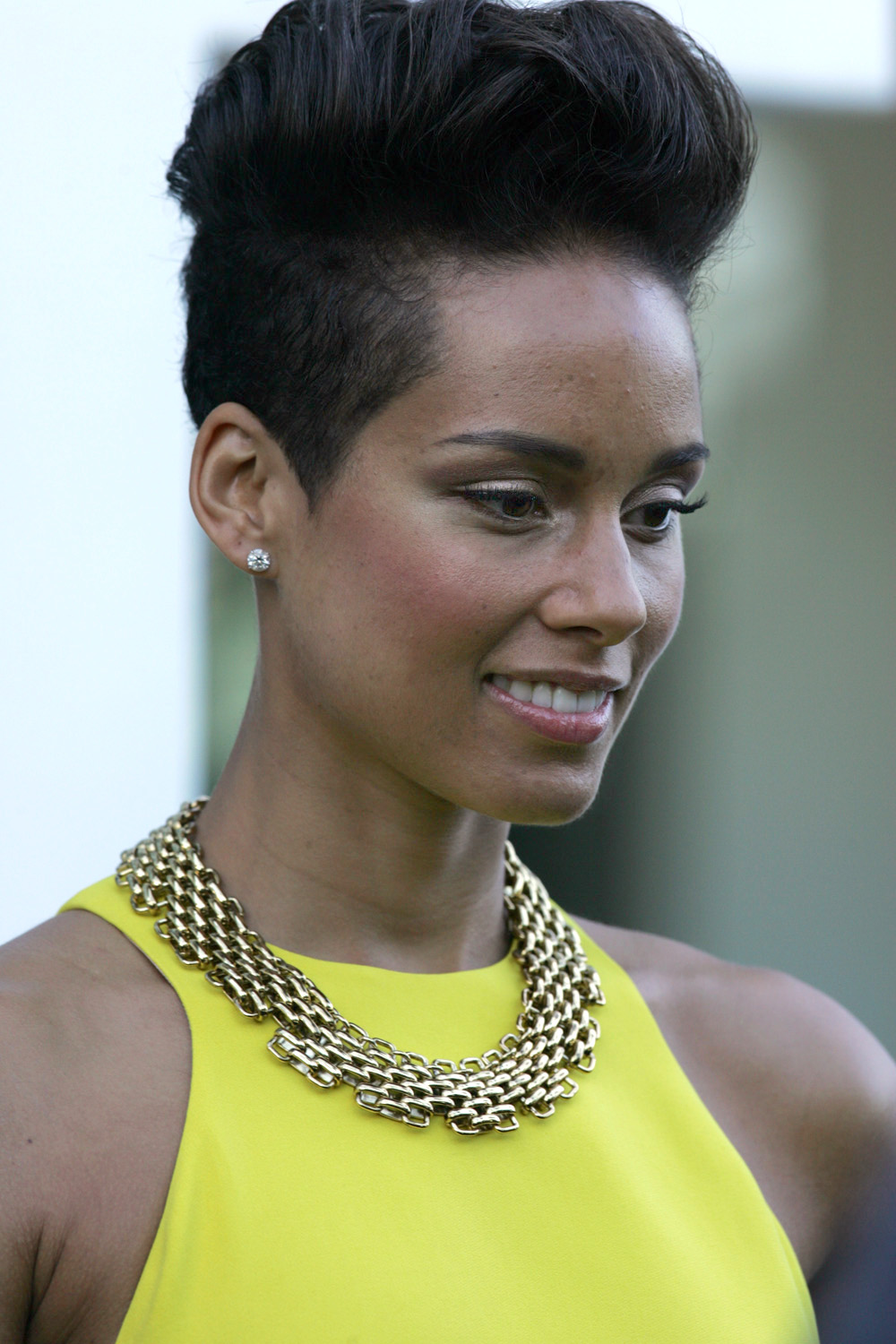
Alicia Keys

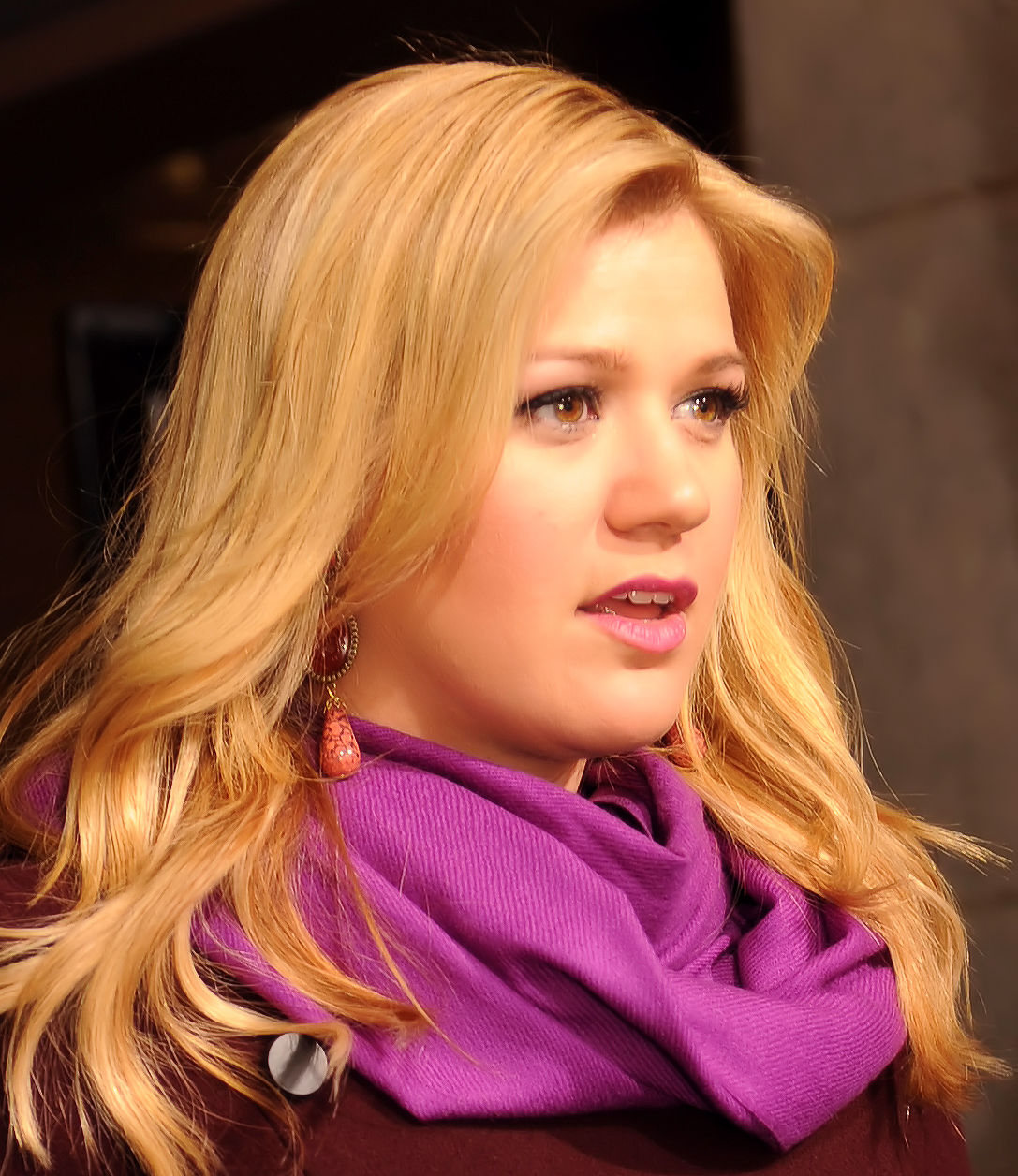
Kelly Clarkson

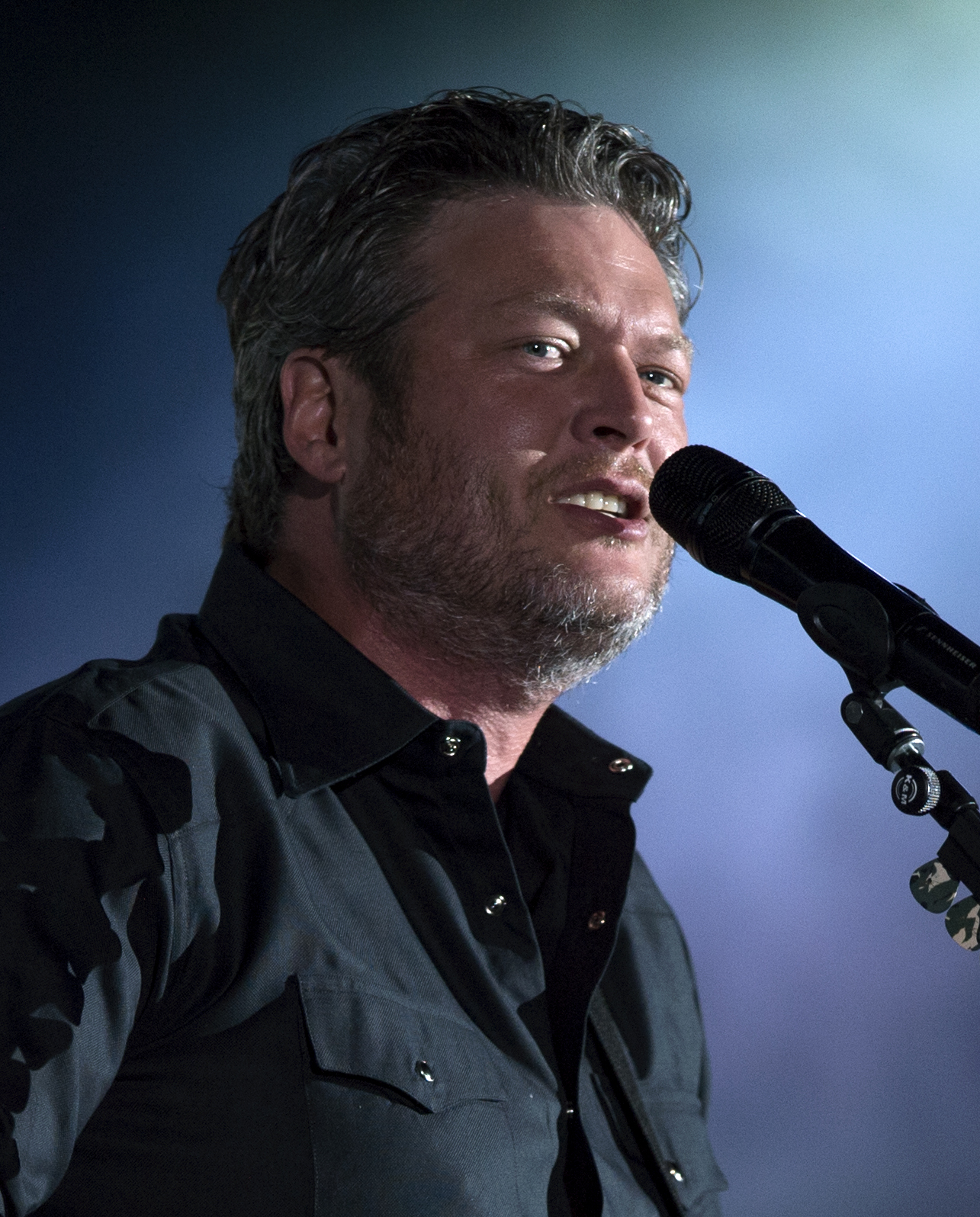
Blake Shelton

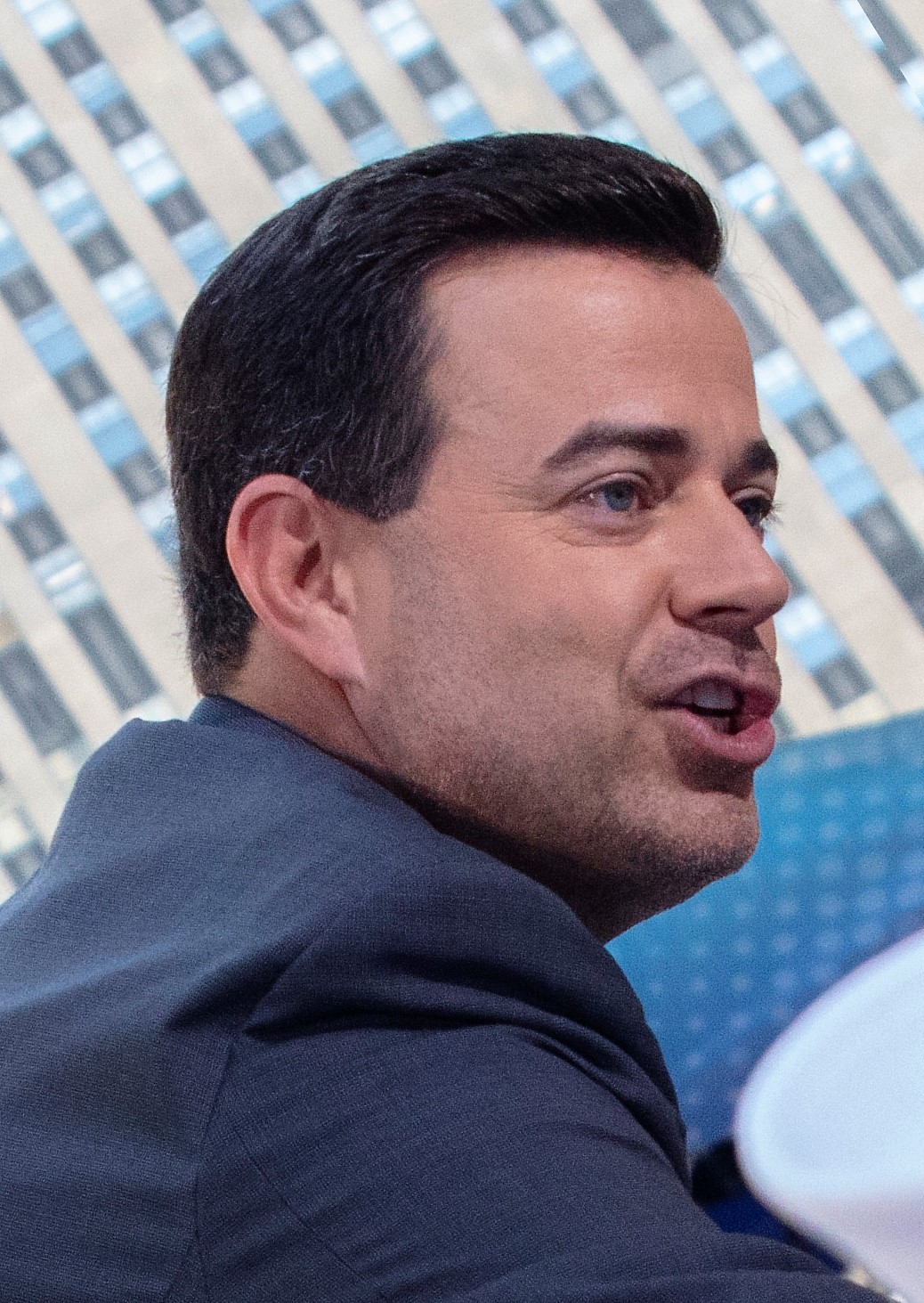
Carson Daly

The coaching lineup changed once again for the fourteenth season. Adam Levine and Blake Shelton returned as coaches, making them the only members of the coaching panel to be part of all fourteen seasons. Miley Cyrus and Jennifer Hudson did not return and were replaced by new coach Kelly Clarkson, who was Team Blake's battle advisor in the 2nd season and key advisor for the Knockout Rounds in 13th season, and Alicia Keys who returned to the panel after a one-season absence and participating in her third season as coach, Carson Daly returned for his fourteenth season as host.

This season's advisors for the Battle Rounds were Julia Michaels for Team Adam, Shawn Mendes for Team Alicia, Hailee Steinfeld for Team Kelly, and Trace Adkins for Team Blake.

The coaches performed a medley set in vintage Las Vegas for the promo. Adam Levine and Blake Shelton performed "Fly Me to the Moon," while Kelly Clarkson and Alicia Keys performed "Feeling Good."

· Notes: At age nineteen, Shawn Mendes became the youngest advisor on the American version of The Voice

== Teams ==
Color key

- Winner
- Runner-up
- Third place
- Fourth place
- Eliminated in Live Shows
- Eliminated in the Live Playoffs
- Stolen in the Knockout rounds
- Eliminated in The Knockouts
- Stolen in the Battle rounds
- Eliminated in the Battle rounds
- Withdrew

| Coaches | Top 48 artists | | | | |
|---|---|---|---|---|---|
| Adam Levine | | | | | |
| Adam Levine | Rayshun LaMarr | Jackie Verna | Sharane Calister | Mia Boostrom | Drew Cole |
| Adam Levine | Reid Umstattd | ~~Gary Edwards~~ | ~~Jackie Foster~~ | Jordyn Simone | ~~Miya Bass~~ |
| Adam Levine | ~~Tish Haynes Keys~~ | Angel Bonilla | Stephanie Skipper | Genesis Diaz | Levelle Davison |
| Alicia Keys | | | | | |
| Alicia Keys | Britton Buchanan | Jackie Foster | Christiana Danielle | Johnny Bliss | Terrence Cunningham |
| Alicia Keys | Kelsea Johnson | ~~Sharane Calister~~ | Dallas Caroline | Miya Bass | ~~Jaclyn Lovey~~ |
| Alicia Keys | ~~Jordyn Simone~~ | Livia Faith | Megan Lee | Shana Halligan | Jamai Perkins |
| Kelly Clarkson | | | | | |
| Kelly Clarkson | Brynn Cartelli | Kaleb Lee | D.R. King | Alexa Cappelli | Tish Haynes Keys |
| Kelly Clarkson | Dylan Hartigan | Jorge Eduardo | Jamella Springfield | Justin Kilgore | ~~Jackie Foster~~ |
| Kelly Clarkson | ~~Dylan Hartigan~~ | Molly Stevens | Teana Boston | Amber Sauer | Hannah Goebel |
| Blake Shelton | | | | | |
| Blake Shelton | Kyla Jade | Spensha Baker | Pryor Baird | Gary Edwards | Austin Giorgio |
| Blake Shelton | WILKES | ~~Dylan Hartigan~~ | Jaron Strom | Jaclyn Lovey | ~~Dallas Caroline~~ |
| Blake Shelton | ~~Kaleb Lee~~ | Jordan Kirkdorffer | Brett Hunter | Bransen Ireland | JessLee |
Note: Italicized names are stolen artists (names struck through within former teams). Underlined names are artists who were saved by their coach in the Knockouts and advanced to the Live Playoffs.

== Blind auditions ==
A new feature within the Blind Auditions this season is the Block, which each coach can use once to prevent one of the other coaches from getting a contestant.

Blind auditions color keys
| ✔ | Coach pressed "I WANT YOU" button |
| | Artist defaulted to a coach's team |
| | Artist selected to join this coach's team |
| | Artist eliminated with no coach pressing their button |
| ✘ | Coach pressed "I WANT YOU" button, but was blocked by another coach from getting the artist |
| | Blocked by Adam; Blocked by Alicia; Blocked by Kelly; Blocked by Blake |

=== Episode 1 (Feb. 26) ===
| Order | Artist | Age | Hometown | Song | Coach's and artist's choices | | | |
| Order | Artist | Age | Hometown | Song | Adam | Alicia | Kelly | Blake |
|---|---|---|---|---|---|---|---|---|
| 1 | Britton Buchanan | 17 | Sanford, North Carolina | "Trouble" | ✘ | ✔ | — | ✔ |
| 2 | Brynn Cartelli | 14 | Longmeadow, Massachusetts | "Beneath Your Beautiful" | — | — | ✔ | ✔ |
| 3 | Rayshun LaMarr | 33 | Fort Washington, Maryland | "Don't Stop Believin'" | ✔ | ✔ | — | — |
| 4 | Kyla Jade | 33 | Nashville, Tennessee | "See Saw" | — | — | ✔ | ✔ |
| 5 | Blaise Raccuglia | 25 | Austin, Texas | "Wanted" | — | — | — | — |
| 6 | Kelsea Johnson | 21 | Newark, Delaware | "Like I'm Gonna Lose You" | ✔ | ✔ | ✔ | — |
| 7 | Drew Cole | 25 | Los Angeles, California | "Sex and Candy" | ✔ | — | — | ✔ |
| 8 | D.R. King | 34 | Strongsville, Ohio | "Believer" | — | — | ✔ | ✔ |
| 9 | Kaleb Lee | 31 | Ormond Beach, Florida | "Never Wanted Nothing More" | — | — | ✔ | ✔ |
| 10 | MaKenzie Thomas | 19 | Wallingford, Kentucky | "Redbone" | — | — | — | — |
| 11 | Justin Kilgore | 30 | Buffalo, Texas | "Tomorrow" | ✔ | ✔ | ✔ | ✘ |

=== Episode 2 (Feb. 27) ===
| Order | Artist | Age | Hometown | Song | Coach's and artist's choices | | | |
| Order | Artist | Age | Hometown | Song | Adam | Alicia | Kelly | Blake |
|---|---|---|---|---|---|---|---|---|
| 1 | Davison | 23 | Little Rock, Arkansas | "To Love Somebody" | ✔ | — | — | ✔ |
| 2 | Jaclyn Lovey | 16 | Placerville, California | "Can't Help Falling in Love" | — | ✔ | — | ✔ |
| 3 | Sophia Dion | 17 | Park City, Utah | "What a Man" | — | — | — | — |
| 4 | Brittney Spencer | N/A | N/A | "Road Less Traveled" | — | — | — | — |
| 5 | Karianne Jean | N/A | N/A | "Blue Ain't Your Color" | — | — | — | — |
| 6 | Wildee Fusaro | N/A | N/A | "Legends" | — | — | — | — |
| 7 | Molly Stevens | 34 | Raleigh, North Carolina | "Heavenly Day" | — | — | ✔ | ✔ |
| 8 | Dylan Hartigan | 21 | Wyckoff, New Jersey | "Danny's Song" | — | — | ✔ | — |
| 9 | Pryor Baird | 35 | Orcutt, California | "I Don't Need No Doctor" | ✔ | ✔ | ✔ | ✔ |

=== Episode 3 (March 5) ===
| Order | Artist | Age | Hometown | Song | Coach's and artist's choices | | | |
| Order | Artist | Age | Hometown | Song | Adam | Alicia | Kelly | Blake |
|---|---|---|---|---|---|---|---|---|
| 1 | Christiana Danielle | 22 | Fort Wayne, Indiana | "Hotline Bling" | ✔ | ✔ | ✔ | — |
| 2 | Brett Hunter | 33 | Pittsburgh, Pennsylvania | "She's a Bad Mama Jama" | — | — | — | ✔ |
| 3 | Jamai | 29 | Chester, Pennsylvania | "U Got It Bad" | — | ✔ | ✔ | — |
| 4 | Mitch Cardoza | 22 | Dartmouth, Massachusetts | "No Woman, No Cry" | — | — | — | — |
| 5 | Mia Boostrom | 24 | Boston, Massachusetts | "Pillowtalk" | ✔ | — | — | — |
| 6 | Jackie Foster | 21 | Boston, Massachusetts | "What About Us" | — | ✔ | ✔ | — |
| 7 | Kayla Woodson | 23 | Nashville, Tennessee | "Turn On the Radio" | — | — | — | — |
| 8 | Reid Umstattd | 34 | Austin, Texas | "Take Me to the Pilot" | ✔ | ✔ | — | — |
| 9 | Jorge Eduardo | 19 | Guadalajara, Mexico / Dallas, Texas | "Despacito" | — | — | ✔ | — |
| 10 | Jamella | 22 | Chicago, Illinois | "Dive" | — | — | ✔ | ✔ |
| 11 | Angel Bonilla | 31 | Quezon City, Philippines / New York City, New York | "Lay Me Down" | ✔ | — | — | — |
| 12 | Austin Giorgio | 21 | Rochester, New York | "How Sweet It Is (To Be Loved by You)" | — | — | ✔ | ✔ |
| 13 | Johnny Bliss | 26 | Puerto Rico / New York City, New York | "Preciosa" | ✔ | ✔ | ✘ | ✔ |

=== Episode 4 (March 6) ===
| Order | Artist | Age | Hometown | Song | Coach's and artist's choices | | | |
| Order | Artist | Age | Hometown | Song | Adam | Alicia | Kelly | Blake |
|---|---|---|---|---|---|---|---|---|
| 1 | Spensha Baker | 24 | San Antonio, Texas | "Blackbird" | — | — | ✔ | ✔ |
| 2 | Alexa Cappelli | 18 | Upland, California | "I've Got the Music in Me" | ✔ | — | ✔ | — |
| 3 | Adrian Brannan | 25 | Elko, Nevada | "Two More Bottles of Wine" | — | — | — | — |
| 4 | WILKES | 33 | Waleska, Georgia | "One Headlight" | ✔ | — | — | ✔ |
| 5 | JessLee | 26 | Loxahatchee, Florida | "I'm With You" | — | — | ✔ | ✔ |
| 6 | Jordyn Simone | 17 | Los Angeles, California | "Tennessee Whiskey" | — | ✔ | — | — |
| 7 | Megan Lee | 22 | Los Angeles, California | "Killing Me Softly with His Song" | — | ✔ | — | — |
| 8 | Jaron Strom | 29 | Shelby, North Carolina | "This Magic Moment" | — | — | — | ✔ |
| 9 | Terrence Cunningham | 36 | Washington, D.C. | "My Girl" | ✔ | ✔ | ✔ | ✔ |

=== Episode 5 (March 12) ===
| Order | Artist | Age | Hometown | Song | Coach's and artist's choices | | | |
| Order | Artist | Age | Hometown | Song | Adam | Alicia | Kelly | Blake |
|---|---|---|---|---|---|---|---|---|
| 1 | Stephanie Skipper | 33 | Nashville, Tennessee | "Piece by Piece" | ✔ | — | — | ✔ |
| 2 | Tish Haynes Keys | 37 | St. Louis, Missouri | "Chain of Fools" | ✔ | — | ✔ | — |
| 3 | Bransen Ireland | 27 | Tulsa, Oklahoma | "Tulsa Time" | ✔ | — | — | ✔ |
| 4 | Teddy Chipouras | N/A | N/A | "Ophelia" | — | — | — | — |
| 5 | Arlo Montenegro | N/A | N/A | "Attention" | — | — | — | — |
| 6 | Daniel Garcia | N/A | N/A | "Perfect" | — | — | — | — |
| 7 | Teana Boston | 16 | Stockton, California | "Unfaithful" | — | — | ✔ | — |
| 8 | Miya Bass | 25 | Queens, New York | "Issues" | ✔ | — | — | — |
| 9 | Livia Faith | 17 | Stanton, Kentucky | "Dream a Little Dream of Me" | — | ✔ | ✔ | ✔ |
| 10 | Jordan Kirkdorffer | 28 | New Paris, Indiana | "In Case You Didn't Know" | ✔ | — | — | ✔ |
| 11 | Shana Halligan | 44 | Los Angeles, California | "Bang Bang (My Baby Shot Me Down)" | — | ✔ | — | — |
| 12 | Gary Edwards | 26 | Dallas, Texas | "What's Going On" | ✔ | — | — | ✔ |
| 13 | Mercedes Ferreira-Dias | 16 | Miami, Florida | "All I Ask" | — | — | — | — |
| 14 | Hannah Goebel | 21 | Nashville, Tennessee | "If I Ain't Got You" | ✔ | ✘ | ✔ | ✔ |

=== Episode 6 (March 13) ===
| Order | Artist | Age | Hometown | Song | Coach's and artist's choices | | | |
| Order | Artist | Age | Hometown | Song | Adam | Alicia | Kelly | Blake |
|---|---|---|---|---|---|---|---|---|
| 1 | Genesis Diaz | 18 | Miami, Florida | "Praying" | ✔ | — | — | ✔ |
| 2 | Sharane Calister | 24 | Des Moines, Iowa | "Make It Rain" | — | ✔ | ✔ | — |
| 3 | Dallas Caroline | 17 | Santa Rosa, California | "Always on My Mind" | ✔ | Team full | ✔ | ✔ |
| 4 | Allen Pride Bowser | 28 | Chicago, Illinois | "What You Won't Do for Love" | — | Team full | — | Team full |
| 5 | Jackie Verna | 22 | West Chester, Pennsylvania | "Peter Pan" | ✔ | Team full | — | Team full |
| 6 | Amber Sauer | 35 | Paradise, California | "Shape of You" | Team full | Team full | ✔ | Team full |

== The Battles ==
The Battle Rounds started on March 19. Season fourteen's advisors include: Julia Michaels for Team Adam, Shawn Mendes for Team Alicia, Hailee Steinfeld for Team Kelly, and Trace Adkins for Team Blake. The coaches can steal two losing artists from other coaches.

Color key:

| Artist won the Battle and advanced to the Knockouts |
| Artist lost the Battle but was stolen by another coach and advanced to the Knockouts |
| Artist lost the Battle and was eliminated |
| Artist voluntarily left the competition |

| Episode | Coach | Order | Winner | Song | Loser | 'Steal' result | | | |
| Episode | Coach | Order | Winner | Song | Loser | Adam | Alicia | Kelly | Blake |
|---|---|---|---|---|---|---|---|---|---|
| Episode 7 (Monday, March 19, 2018) | Alicia Keys | 1 | Sharane Calister | "Mercy" | Jamai | — | —N/a | — | — |
| Episode 7 (Monday, March 19, 2018) | Kelly Clarkson | 2 | Brynn Cartelli | "...Ready for It?" | Dylan Hartigan | — | — | —N/a | ✔ |
| Episode 7 (Monday, March 19, 2018) | Blake Shelton | 3 | Kyla Jade | "One Last Time" | JessLee | — | — | — | —N/a |
| Episode 7 (Monday, March 19, 2018) | Adam Levine | 4 | Rayshun LaMarr | "Sweet Thing" | Tish Haynes Keys | —N/a | — | ✔ | — |
| Episode 7 (Monday, March 19, 2018) | Alicia Keys | 5 | Christiana Danielle | "Use Somebody" | Shana Halligan | — | —N/a | — | — |
| Episode 7 (Monday, March 19, 2018) | Kelly Clarkson | 6 | D.R. King | "Sign of the Times" | Jackie Foster | ✔ | ✔ | —N/a | ✔ |
| Episode 8 (Tuesday, March 20, 2018) | Kelly Clarkson | 1 | Jorge Eduardo | "Starving" | Amber Sauer | — | — | —N/a | — |
| Episode 8 (Tuesday, March 20, 2018) | Adam Levine | 2 | Reid Umstattd | "Love on the Brain" | Davison | —N/a | — | — | — |
| Episode 8 (Tuesday, March 20, 2018) | Blake Shelton | 3 | Jaron Strom | "Head Over Boots" | Bransen Ireland | — | — | — | —N/a |
| Episode 8 (Tuesday, March 20, 2018) | Alicia Keys | 4 | Johnny Bliss | "Versace on the Floor" | Megan Lee | — | —N/a | — | — |
| Episode 8 (Tuesday, March 20, 2018) | Kelly Clarkson | 5 | Jamella | "Will You Love Me Tomorrow" | Teana Boston | — | — | —N/a | — |
| Episode 8 (Tuesday, March 20, 2018) | Alicia Keys | 6 | Kelsea Johnson | "Don't Let Go (Love)" | Jordyn Simone | ✔ | —N/a | ✔ | — |
| Episode 9 (Monday, March 26, 2018) | Blake Shelton | 1 | Pryor Baird | "Don't Do Me Like That" | Kaleb Lee | Team full | — | ✔ | —N/a |
| Episode 9 (Monday, March 26, 2018) | Adam Levine | 2 | Mia Boostrom | "Because of You" | Genesis Diaz | Team full | — | Team full | — |
| Episode 9 (Monday, March 26, 2018) | Kelly Clarkson | 3 | Justin Kilgore | "Burning House" | Molly Stevens | Team full | — | Team full | — |
| Episode 9 (Monday, March 26, 2018) | Adam Levine | 4 | Drew Cole | "Knockin' on Heaven's Door" | Miya Bass | Team full | ✔ | Team full | — |
| Episode 9 (Monday, March 26, 2018) | Blake Shelton | 5 | WILKES | "Nobody to Blame" | Jordan Kirkdorffer | Team full | — | Team full | —N/a |
| Episode 9 (Monday, March 26, 2018) | Alicia Keys | 6 | Britton Buchanan | "Thinking Out Loud" | Jaclyn Lovey | Team full | —N/a | Team full | ✔ |
| Episode 10 (Tuesday, March 27, 2018) | Adam Levine | 1 | Jackie Verna | "These Dreams" | Stephanie Skipper | Team full | — | Team full | Team full |
| Episode 10 (Tuesday, March 27, 2018) | Alicia Keys | 2 | Terrence Cunningham | "Stars" | Livia Faith | Team full | —N/a | Team full | Team full |
| Episode 10 (Tuesday, March 27, 2018) | Adam Levine | 3 | Gary Edwards | "When You Believe" | Angel Bonilla | Team full | — | Team full | Team full |
| Episode 10 (Tuesday, March 27, 2018) | Blake Shelton | 4 | Austin Giorgio | "Me and Mrs. Jones" | Brett Hunter | Team full | — | Team full | Team full |
| Episode 10 (Tuesday, March 27, 2018) | Kelly Clarkson | 5 | Alexa Cappelli^{1} | "Pray" | Hannah Goebel^{1} | Team full | — | Team full | Team full |
| Episode 10 (Tuesday, March 27, 2018) | Blake Shelton | 6 | Spensha Baker | "I Could Use a Love Song" | Dallas Caroline | Team full | ✔ | Team full | Team full |
| Episode 11 (Wednesday, March 28, 2018) | The eleventh episode was a special episode titled "The Best of the Blinds and Battles". It featured some of the best moments from the blind auditions, battles, and other unseen content. | | | | | | | | |

1. Alexa Cappelli was paired with Hannah Goebel for the battles, but for personal reasons, Goebel withdrew. Therefore, Cappelli performed by herself and moved on by default.

== The Knockouts ==
The Knockouts round started on April 2. The coaches can each steal one losing artist from another team and save one artist who lost their Knockout on their own team. The top 24 contestants then moved on to the Live Playoffs.

For the first time ever in The Voice history, former winners of the show returned as Key Advisors — Jordan Smith for Team Adam, Chris Blue for Team Alicia, Cassadee Pope for Team Kelly, and Chloe Kohanski for Team Blake.

Color key:

| Artist won the Knockout and advanced to the Live Playoffs |
| Artist lost the Knockout but was stolen by another coach and advanced to the Live Playoffs |
| Artist lost the Knockout but was saved by their coach and advanced to the Live Playoffs |
| Artist lost the Knockout and was Eliminated |

| Episodes | Coach | Order | Song | Artists | | Song | 'Steal'/'Save' result | | | |
| Episodes | Coach | Order | Song | Winner | Loser | Song | Adam | Alicia | Kelly | Blake |
|---|---|---|---|---|---|---|---|---|---|---|
| Episode 12 (Monday, April 2, 2018) | Blake Shelton | 1 | "You Don't Own Me" | Kyla Jade | Jaclyn Lovey | "Put Your Records On" | — | — | — | — |
| Episode 12 (Monday, April 2, 2018) | Kelly Clarkson | 2 | "Free" | Kaleb Lee | Justin Kilgore | "Shameless" | — | — | — | — |
| Episode 12 (Monday, April 2, 2018) | Adam Levine | 3 | "Wade in the Water" | Mia Boostrom | Jackie Foster | "Bring Me to Life" | ✔ | ✔ | ✔ | ✔ |
| Episode 12 (Monday, April 2, 2018) | Blake Shelton | 4 | "Broken Halos" | Spensha Baker | Austin Giorgio | "Almost Like Being in Love" | — | Steal Used | — | ✔ |
| Episode 12 (Monday, April 2, 2018) | Alicia Keys | 5 | "Alive" | Johnny Bliss | Miya Bass | "Castle on the Hill" | — | — | — | — |
| Episode 12 (Monday, April 2, 2018) | Adam Levine | 6 | "American Honey" | Jackie Verna | Drew Cole | "Slow Hands" | ✔ | Steal Used | — | ✔ |
| Episode 13 (Tuesday, April 3, 2018) | Kelly Clarkson | 1 | "Here Comes Goodbye" | Brynn Cartelli | Jamella | "Girl Crush" | — | Steal Used | — | — |
| Episode 13 (Tuesday, April 3, 2018) | Blake Shelton | 2 | "Will It Go Round in Circles" | Pryor Baird | Jaron Strom | "Grenade" | — | Steal Used | — | Save Used |
| Episode 13 (Tuesday, April 3, 2018) | Alicia Keys | 3 | "Tell Me Something Good" | Terrence Cunningham | Christiana Danielle | "Elastic Heart" | ✔ | ✔ | ✔ | — |
| Episode 14 (Monday, April 9, 2018) | Alicia Keys | 1 | "New York State of Mind" | Britton Buchanan | Dallas Caroline | "Bless the Broken Road" | — | Team full | — | — |
| Episode 14 (Monday, April 9, 2018) | Kelly Clarkson | 2 | "(I Know) I'm Losing You" | D.R. King | Tish Haynes Keys | "Lady Marmalade" | ✔ | Team full | ✔ | — |
| Episode 14 (Monday, April 9, 2018) | Blake Shelton | 3 | "The Climb" | WILKES | Dylan Hartigan | "You Are the Best Thing" | — | Team full | ✔ | Save Used |
| Episode 14 (Monday, April 9, 2018) | Adam Levine | 4 | "Fallin'" | Rayshun LaMarr | Gary Edwards | "Many Rivers to Cross" | Save Used | Team full | Team Full | ✔ |
| Episode 14 (Monday, April 9, 2018) | Kelly Clarkson | 5 | "Goodbye Yellow Brick Road" | Alexa Cappelli | Jorge Eduardo | "Adorn" | — | Team full | Team Full | Team Full |
| Episode 14 (Monday, April 9, 2018) | Adam Levine | 6 | "Let Him Fly" | Reid Umstattd | Jordyn Simone | "Tell Me You Love Me" | Save Used | Team full | Team Full | Team Full |
| Episode 14 (Monday, April 9, 2018) | Alicia Keys | 7 | "Rise Up" | Kelsea Johnson | Sharane Calister | "All I Could Do Was Cry" | ✔ | Team full | Team Full | Team Full |
| Episode 15 (Tuesday, April 10, 2018) | The fifteenth episode was a special episode titled "The Road to the Live Shows." The episode showed the best moments of the season so far, including the blind auditions, the journey of the top 24 contestants, and some unseen footage. | | | | | | | | | |

== Live Shows ==
Color key:

| Artist was saved by the Public's votes |
| Artist was placed in the bottom two, bottom three, or middle three or was saved by the coach |
| Artist was saved by the Instant Save |
| Artist's iTunes vote multiplied by 5 (except The Finals) after his/her studio version of the song reached iTunes top 10 |
| Artist was eliminated |

=== Week 1: Live Playoffs (April 16, 17, and 18) ===
For the first time, the Live Playoffs were split into two rounds and introduced immunity to the highest vote-getters to advance to the Top 12 in Round 1.

==== Round 1 ====
During the first round of the Live Playoffs, the Top 24 performed for the votes of the public. The artist with the highest number of votes on each team directly advanced to the Top 12, exempting from performing (and immune from elimination in) round 2.

Color key:

| Artist received the highest number of votes on his/her team and directly advanced to the Top 12 |
| Artist was not chosen by the public and was left to perform again in Round 2 |

| Episode | Coach | Order | Artist | Song | Result |
|---|---|---|---|---|---|
| Episode 16 (Monday, April 16, 2018) | Kelly Clarkson | 1 | Alexa Cappelli | "It Hurt So Bad" | Not Chosen |
| Episode 16 (Monday, April 16, 2018) | Kelly Clarkson | 2 | Kaleb Lee | "You Don't Even Know Who I Am" | Not Chosen |
| Episode 16 (Monday, April 16, 2018) | Kelly Clarkson | 3 | Tish Haynes Keys | "Nothing Left For You" | Not Chosen |
| Episode 16 (Monday, April 16, 2018) | Kelly Clarkson | 4 | Brynn Cartelli | "Unstoppable" | Public's vote |
| Episode 16 (Monday, April 16, 2018) | Kelly Clarkson | 5 | Dylan Hartigan | "Come Pick Me Up" | Not Chosen |
| Episode 16 (Monday, April 16, 2018) | Kelly Clarkson | 6 | D.R. King | "Home" | Not Chosen |
| Episode 16 (Monday, April 16, 2018) | Adam Levine | 7 | Drew Cole | "Man In the Mirror" | Not Chosen |
| Episode 16 (Monday, April 16, 2018) | Adam Levine | 8 | Mia Boostrom | "Baby I Love You" | Not Chosen |
| Episode 16 (Monday, April 16, 2018) | Adam Levine | 9 | Jackie Verna | "Tim McGraw" | Not Chosen |
| Episode 16 (Monday, April 16, 2018) | Adam Levine | 10 | Rayshun LaMarr | "Overjoyed" | Not Chosen |
| Episode 16 (Monday, April 16, 2018) | Adam Levine | 11 | Sharane Calister | "Never Enough" | Public's vote |
| Episode 16 (Monday, April 16, 2018) | Adam Levine | 12 | Reid Umstattd | "I Still Haven't Found What I'm Looking For" | Not Chosen |
| Episode 16 (Monday, April 16, 2018) | Blake Shelton | 13 | Austin Giorgio | "Ain't That a Kick in the Head" | Not Chosen |
| Episode 16 (Monday, April 16, 2018) | Blake Shelton | 14 | Pryor Baird | "I Was Wrong" | Not Chosen |
| Episode 16 (Monday, April 16, 2018) | Blake Shelton | 15 | Kyla Jade | "How Great Thou Art" | Public's vote |
| Episode 16 (Monday, April 16, 2018) | Blake Shelton | 16 | Gary Edwards | "Finesse" | Not Chosen |
| Episode 16 (Monday, April 16, 2018) | Blake Shelton | 17 | Spensha Baker | "I Still Believe in You" | Not Chosen |
| Episode 16 (Monday, April 16, 2018) | Blake Shelton | 18 | WILKES | "Brother" | Not Chosen |
| Episode 16 (Monday, April 16, 2018) | Alicia Keys | 19 | Johnny Bliss | "América América" | Not Chosen |
| Episode 16 (Monday, April 16, 2018) | Alicia Keys | 20 | Kelsea Johnson | "You Know I'm No Good" | Not Chosen |
| Episode 16 (Monday, April 16, 2018) | Alicia Keys | 21 | Terrence Cunningham | "How Come U Don't Call Me Anymore?" | Not Chosen |
| Episode 16 (Monday, April 16, 2018) | Alicia Keys | 22 | Jackie Foster | "Never Tear Us Apart" | Not Chosen |
| Episode 16 (Monday, April 16, 2018) | Alicia Keys | 23 | Christiana Danielle | "Hey Ya!" | Not Chosen |
| Episode 16 (Monday, April 16, 2018) | Alicia Keys | 24 | Britton Buchanan | "Some Kind of Wonderful" | Public's vote |

==== Round 2 ====
For Tuesday and Wednesday nights, the 20 remaining artists performed a second time for the votes of the public (separate from the previous round's votes). The artist with the highest number of votes on each team advances, and a third decided by the coach itself.

Color key:

| Artist received the Public's vote and advanced to the Top 12 |
| Artist was selected by their coach to advance to the Top 12 |
| Artist was eliminated |

| Episode | Coach | Order | Artist | Song | Result |
|---|---|---|---|---|---|
| Episode 17 (Tuesday, April 17, 2018) | Blake Shelton | 1 | Spensha Baker | "Smoke Break" | Blake's choice |
| Episode 17 (Tuesday, April 17, 2018) | Blake Shelton | 2 | WILKES | "Don't Speak" | Eliminated |
| Episode 17 (Tuesday, April 17, 2018) | Blake Shelton | 3 | Pryor Baird | "9 to 5" | Public's vote |
| Episode 17 (Tuesday, April 17, 2018) | Blake Shelton | 4 | Austin Giorgio | "Love Yourself" | Eliminated |
| Episode 17 (Tuesday, April 17, 2018) | Blake Shelton | 5 | Gary Edwards | "America the Beautiful" | Eliminated |
| Episode 17 (Tuesday, April 17, 2018) | Alicia Keys | 6 | Terrence Cunningham | "Ain't Nobody" | Eliminated |
| Episode 17 (Tuesday, April 17, 2018) | Alicia Keys | 7 | Christiana Danielle | "Take Me to Church" | Alicia's choice |
| Episode 17 (Tuesday, April 17, 2018) | Alicia Keys | 8 | Jackie Foster | "Alone" | Public's vote |
| Episode 17 (Tuesday, April 17, 2018) | Alicia Keys | 9 | Kelsea Johnson | "Need U Bad" | Eliminated |
| Episode 17 (Tuesday, April 17, 2018) | Alicia Keys | 10 | Johnny Bliss | "One and Only" | Eliminated |
| Episode 18 (Wednesday, April 18, 2018) | Kelly Clarkson | 1 | Kaleb Lee | "Die a Happy Man" | Public's vote |
| Episode 18 (Wednesday, April 18, 2018) | Kelly Clarkson | 2 | Alexa Cappelli | "Stop And Stare" | Eliminated |
| Episode 18 (Wednesday, April 18, 2018) | Kelly Clarkson | 3 | D.R. King | "All on My Mind" | Kelly's choice |
| Episode 18 (Wednesday, April 18, 2018) | Kelly Clarkson | 4 | Dylan Hartigan | "Mary Jane's Last Dance" | Eliminated |
| Episode 18 (Wednesday, April 18, 2018) | Kelly Clarkson | 5 | Tish Haynes Keys | At Last" | Eliminated |
| Episode 18 (Wednesday, April 18, 2018) | Adam Levine | 6 | Reid Umstattd | "Long Cool Woman in a Black Dress" | Eliminated |
| Episode 18 (Wednesday, April 18, 2018) | Adam Levine | 7 | Jackie Verna | "Once" | Adam's choice |
| Episode 18 (Wednesday, April 18, 2018) | Adam Levine | 8 | Drew Cole | "Wild Horses" | Eliminated |
| Episode 18 (Wednesday, April 18, 2018) | Adam Levine | 9 | Mia Boostrom | "Either Way" | Eliminated |
| Episode 18 (Wednesday, April 18, 2018) | Adam Levine | 10 | Rayshun LaMarr | "I'm Goin' Down" | Public's vote |

=== Week 2: Top 12 (April 23–24) ===
This week's theme was "Story Behind The Song". The two artists with the fewest votes competed for an Instant Save, with one artist eliminated from the competition. No artists received the iTunes vote multiplier this week as none of the singles reached the Top 10 iTunes.

| Episode | Coach | Order | Artist | Song | Result |
|---|---|---|---|---|---|
| Episode 19 (Monday, April 23, 2018) | Adam Levine | 1 | Rayshun LaMarr | "When Love Takes Over" | Bottom two |
| Episode 19 (Monday, April 23, 2018) | Kelly Clarkson | 2 | Kaleb Lee | "Amazed" | Public's vote |
| Episode 19 (Monday, April 23, 2018) | Alicia Keys | 3 | Jackie Foster | "Toxic" | Public's vote |
| Episode 19 (Monday, April 23, 2018) | Blake Shelton | 4 | Spensha Baker | "Down on My Knees" | Public's vote |
| Episode 19 (Monday, April 23, 2018) | Alicia Keys | 5 | Christiana Danielle | "Say Something" | Public's vote |
| Episode 19 (Monday, April 23, 2018) | Kelly Clarkson | 6 | D.R. King | "White Flag" | Bottom two |
| Episode 19 (Monday, April 23, 2018) | Adam Levine | 7 | Sharane Calister | "In My Blood" | Public's vote |
| Episode 19 (Monday, April 23, 2018) | Blake Shelton | 8 | Pryor Baird | "Pickin' Wildflowers" | Public's vote |
| Episode 19 (Monday, April 23, 2018) | Kelly Clarkson | 9 | Brynn Cartelli | "Up to the Mountain" | Public's vote |
| Episode 19 (Monday, April 23, 2018) | Adam Levine | 10 | Jackie Verna | "I'm With You" | Public's vote |
| Episode 19 (Monday, April 23, 2018) | Alicia Keys | 11 | Britton Buchanan | "Small Town" | Public's vote |
| Episode 19 (Monday, April 23, 2018) | Blake Shelton | 12 | Kyla Jade | "One Night Only" | Public's vote |
Instant Save Performances
| Episode 20 (Tuesday, April 24, 2018) | Kelly Clarkson | 1 | D.R. King | "Papa Was a Rollin' Stone" | Eliminated |
| Episode 20 (Tuesday, April 24, 2018) | Adam Levine | 2 | Rayshun LaMarr | "I Can't Stand the Rain" | Instant Save |

Non-competition performances
| Order | Performers | Song |
|---|---|---|
| 20.1 | Kelly Clarkson and her team (Brynn Cartelli, D.R. King, and Kaleb Lee) | "Don't Take the Money" |
| 20.2 | Maroon 5 | "Wait" |
| 20.3 | The cast of Rise | "Scars to Your Beautiful" |
| 20.4 | Blake Shelton and his team (Pryor Baird, Kyla Jade, and Spensha Baker) | "I Thank You" |

=== Week 3: Top 11 (April 30, May 1) ===
The theme for this week was "Fan Night", meaning that the artists performed songs chosen by the fans.

iTunes bonuses were awarded to Pryor Baird (#4) and Britton Buchanan (#6).

| Episode | Coach | Order | Artist | Song | Result |
|---|---|---|---|---|---|
| Episode 21 (Monday, April 30, 2018) | Blake Shelton | 1 | Pryor Baird | "Night Moves" | Public's vote |
| Episode 21 (Monday, April 30, 2018) | Adam Levine | 2 | Sharane Calister | "Hero" | Bottom two |
| Episode 21 (Monday, April 30, 2018) | Kelly Clarkson | 3 | Kaleb Lee | "T-R-O-U-B-L-E" | Public's vote |
| Episode 21 (Monday, April 30, 2018) | Alicia Keys | 4 | Jackie Foster | "Love, Reign o'er Me" | Public's vote |
| Episode 21 (Monday, April 30, 2018) | Adam Levine | 5 | Jackie Verna | "Strawberry Wine" | Public's vote |
| Episode 21 (Monday, April 30, 2018) | Blake Shelton | 6 | Kyla Jade | "(Sweet Sweet Baby) Since You've Been Gone" | Public's vote |
| Episode 21 (Monday, April 30, 2018) | Alicia Keys | 7 | Christiana Danielle | "Umbrella" | Bottom two |
| Episode 21 (Monday, April 30, 2018) | Kelly Clarkson | 8 | Brynn Cartelli | "You and I" | Public's vote |
| Episode 21 (Monday, April 30, 2018) | Adam Levine | 9 | Rayshun LaMarr | "Try a Little Tenderness" | Public's vote |
| Episode 21 (Monday, April 30, 2018) | Alicia Keys | 10 | Britton Buchanan | "Perfect" | Public's vote |
| Episode 21 (Monday, April 30, 2018) | Blake Shelton | 11 | Spensha Baker | "Better Man" | Public's vote |
Instant Save Performances
| Episode 22 (Tuesday, May 1, 2018) | Adam Levine | 1 | Sharane Calister | "If I Were a Boy" | Eliminated |
| Episode 22 (Tuesday, May 1, 2018) | Alicia Keys | 2 | Christiana Danielle | "A Thousand Years" | Instant Save |

Non-competition performances
| Order | Performers | Song |
|---|---|---|
| 22.1 | Janelle Monáe | "Make Me Feel" |
| 22.2 | Adam Levine and his team (Sharane Calister, Rayshun LaMarr and Jackie Verna) | "The Scientist" |
| 22.3 | Alicia Keys and her team (Britton Buchanan, Christiana Danielle and Jackie Foster) | "Gimme Shelter" |

=== Week 4: Top 10 (May 7–8) ===
The theme for this week was "Overcoming Struggles". This week featured double elimination and a bottom three facing Instant Save.

iTunes bonuses were awarded to Kyla Jade (#5), Brynn Cartelli (#8), Buchanan (#9), and Baird (#10).

| Episode | Coach | Order | Artist | Song | Result |
|---|---|---|---|---|---|
| Episode 23 (Monday, May 7, 2018) | Blake Shelton | 1 | Kyla Jade | "This Is Me" | Public's vote |
| Episode 23 (Monday, May 7, 2018) | Kelly Clarkson | 2 | Kaleb Lee | "Boondocks" | Public's vote |
| Episode 23 (Monday, May 7, 2018) | Adam Levine | 3 | Jackie Verna | "Love Triangle" | Bottom three |
| Episode 23 (Monday, May 7, 2018) | Adam Levine | 4 | Rayshun LaMarr | "Grant Green" | Bottom three |
| Episode 23 (Monday, May 7, 2018) | Blake Shelton | 5 | Spensha Baker | "Red" | Public's Vote |
| Episode 23 (Monday, May 7, 2018) | Alicia Keys | 6 | Jackie Foster | "Gravity" | Public's vote |
| Episode 23 (Monday, May 7, 2018) | Alicia Keys | 7 | Britton Buchanan | "What's Love Got to Do with It" | Public's vote |
| Episode 23 (Monday, May 7, 2018) | Alicia Keys | 8 | Christiana Danielle | "Ain't No Sunshine" | Bottom three |
| Episode 23 (Monday, May 7, 2018) | Blake Shelton | 9 | Pryor Baird | "My Town" | Public's vote |
| Episode 23 (Monday, May 7, 2018) | Kelly Clarkson | 10 | Brynn Cartelli | "Fix You" | Public's vote |
Instant Save Performances
| Episode 24 (Tuesday, May 8, 2018) | Alicia Keys | 1 | Christiana Danielle | "Unchain My Heart" | Eliminated |
| Episode 24 (Tuesday, May 8, 2018) | Adam Levine | 2 | Jackie Verna | "I Told You So" | Eliminated |
| Episode 24 (Tuesday, May 8, 2018) | Adam Levine | 3 | Rayshun LaMarr | "Let's Get It On" | Instant Save |

Non-competition performances
| Order | Performers | Song |
|---|---|---|
| 23.1 | Kelly Clarkson | "I Don't Think About You" |
| 24.1 | Charlie Puth | "Done for Me" |
| 24.2 | 5 Seconds of Summer | "Youngblood" |

=== Week 5: Semifinals (May 14–15) ===
The Top 8 performed on Monday, May 14, 2018, with the results following on Tuesday, May 15, 2018. This week's theme is "Duet Medley Songs". In the semifinals, three artists automatically moved on to next week's finale, the two artists with the fewest votes were immediately eliminated and the middle three contended for the remaining spot in next week's finale via the Instant Save. iTunes bonuses were awarded to Jade (#2), Buchanan (#3), Cartelli (#4), Kaleb Lee (#6), Baird (#7) and Spensha Baker (#10). In addition to their individual songs, each artist performed a duet with another artist in the competition, though these duets were not available for purchase on iTunes.

With the elimination of Rayshun LaMarr, Levine no longer had any artists remaining on his team, making it the first time since the 4th season (and the third time overall, with the first time being the 3rd season) in which none of his artists represented him in the finale. Also with the eliminations of Pryor Baird and Kaleb Lee, they were pitted against each other in the Battles. With the advancement of Cartelli to the finale, Clarkson became the third new coach to successfully get an artist on their team to the finale on their first attempt as a coach, the second being Alicia Keys, who coached Wé McDonald all the way to the finale of the 11th season, and the first being Usher, who coached Michelle Chamuel all the way to the finale of the 4th season. This also marked the first time ever that two female coaches were represented in the finale, with Cartelli representing Clarkson, and Buchanan representing Keys.

| Episode | Coach | Order | Artist | Solo Song | Duet Medley | Results |
|---|---|---|---|---|---|---|
| Episode 25 (Monday, May 14, 2018) | Kelly Clarkson | 1 (8) | Brynn Cartelli | "What the World Needs Now is Love" | "FourFiveSeconds"/"You Can't Always Get What You Want" | Public's vote |
| Episode 25 (Monday, May 14, 2018) | Alicia Keys | 3 (10) | Jackie Foster | "Here I Go Again" | "Believer"/"Radioactive" | Eliminated |
| Episode 25 (Monday, May 14, 2018) | Adam Levine | 5 (10) | Rayshun LaMarr | "Imagine" | "Believer"/"Radioactive" | Eliminated |
| Episode 25 (Monday, May 14, 2018) | Blake Shelton | 6 (4) | Spensha Baker | "My Church" | "What's Going On"/"Rise Up" | Public's vote |
| Episode 25 (Monday, May 14, 2018) | Blake Shelton | 7 (4) | Kyla Jade | "Let It Be" | "What's Going On"/"Rise Up" | Public's vote |
| Episode 25 (Monday, May 14, 2018) | Kelly Clarkson | 9 (2) | Kaleb Lee | "It Is Well with My Soul" | "Hillbilly Bone"/"Hillbilly Deluxe" | Middle Three |
| Episode 25 (Monday, May 14, 2018) | Blake Shelton | 11 (2) | Pryor Baird | "Change the World" | "Hillbilly Bone"/"Hillbilly Deluxe" | Middle Three |
| Episode 25 (Monday, May 14, 2018) | Alicia Keys | 12 (8) | Britton Buchanan | "The Rising" | "FourFiveSeconds"/"You Can't Always Get What You Want" | Middle Three |
Instant Save Performances
| Episode 26 (Tuesday, May 15, 2018) | Blake Shelton | 1 | Pryor Baird | "Soulshine" | | Eliminated |
| Episode 26 (Tuesday, May 15, 2018) | Kelly Clarkson | 2 | Kaleb Lee | "Simple Man" | | Eliminated |
| Episode 26 (Tuesday, May 15, 2018) | Alicia Keys | 3 | Britton Buchanan | "Dancing on My Own" | | Instant Save |

Non-competition performances
| Order | Performer | Song |
|---|---|---|
| 26.1 | Kane Brown | "Heaven" |
| 26.2 | Panic! at the Disco | "Say Amen (Saturday Night)" |
| 26.3 | Blake Shelton | "I Lived It" |

=== Week 6: Finale (May 21–22) ===
The Final 4 performed on Monday, May 21, 2018, with the final results following on Tuesday, May 22, 2018. Finalists performed a solo cover song, a duet with their coach, and an original song. iTunes bonuses were awarded to Buchanan (#1 and #10), Cartelli (#3 and #6), Baker (#4) and Jade (#9).

This is the first time that an artist who won the Instant Save in the semifinals didn't finish in the bottom two in the finals, with Buchanan finishing second. With Buchanan and Cartelli making it to the Top 2, this marked the first time in which the final results came down to two artists who have neither represented Shelton nor Levine, but two female coaches (Buchanan representing Alicia Keys, and Cartelli representing Kelly Clarkson), as well as the two coaches in the "middle chairs."

| Coach | Artist | Order | Solo Song | Order | Duet Song (with Coach) | Order | Original Song | Result |
|---|---|---|---|---|---|---|---|---|
| Blake Shelton | Kyla Jade | 1 | "With a Little Help from My Friends" | 9 | "Only Love" | 6 | "The Last Tear" | Third Place |
| Alicia Keys | Britton Buchanan | 10 | "Good Lovin'" | 5 | "Wake Me Up" | 2 | "Where You Come From" | Runner-up |
| Kelly Clarkson | Brynn Cartelli | 12 | "Skyfall" | 3 | "Don't Dream It's Over" | 8 | "Walk My Way" | Winner |
| Blake Shelton | Spensha Baker | 4 | "Merry Go 'Round" | 7 | "Tell Me About It" | 11 | "Old Soul" | Fourth Place |

Non-competition performances
| Order | Performer | Song |
|---|---|---|
| 28.1 | Britton Buchanan (with WILKES, Jackie Foster, Christiana Danielle and Mia Boostrom) | "In the Air Tonight" |
| 28.2 | Dua Lipa | "IDGAF" |
| 28.3 | Kane Brown and Spensha Baker | "What Ifs" |
| 28.4 | James Bay and Alicia Keys | "Us" |
| 28.5 | Chloe Kohanski | "Come This Far" |
| 28.6 | Julia Michaels and Brynn Cartelli | "Issues"/"Jump" |
| 28.7 | Kyla Jade (with Johnny Bliss, Rayshun LaMarr and Sharane Calister) | "Killer"/"Papa Was A Rolling Stone" |
| 28.8 | Florence and the Machine | "Hunger" |
| 28.9 | Ryan Adams and Britton Buchanan | "To Be Without You" |
| 28.10 | Halsey and Big Sean | "Alone" |
| 28.11 | Jason Aldean | "Drowns the Whiskey" |
| 28.12 | Jennifer Hudson and Kyla Jade | "I Know Where I've Been" |

== Elimination chart ==
=== Color key ===
Artist's info

- Team Adam
- Team Alicia
- Team Kelly
- Team Blake

Results details

- Winner
- Runner-up
- Third place
- Fourth place
- Saved by Instant Save (via Twitter)
- Saved by the public
- Saved by their coach
- Artist did not receive immunity
- Immune
- Eliminated
- Artist received one or more iTunes bonus that week
- Number of iTunes bonuses received
- Teams are in 3 artists
- No artists remaining on his/her team

=== Overall ===
Live Show Results per week
| Artist | Week 1 Playoffs | | Week 2 | Week 3 | Week 4 | Week 5 | Week 6 Finale |
| Artist | Round 1 | Round 2 | Week 2 | Week 3 | Week 4 | Week 5 | Week 6 Finale |
|---|---|---|---|---|---|---|---|
| Brynn Cartelli | Safe | Immune | Safe | Safe | Safe | Safe | Winner |
| Britton Buchanan | Safe | Immune | Safe | Safe | Safe | Safe | Runner-up |
| Kyla Jade | Safe | Immune | Safe | Safe | Safe | Safe | 3rd place |
| Spensha Baker | Not Chosen | Safe | Safe | Safe | Safe | Safe | 4th place |
| Pryor Baird | Not Chosen | Safe | Safe | Safe | Safe | Eliminated | Eliminated (Week 5) |
| Kaleb Lee | Not Chosen | Safe | Safe | Safe | Safe | Eliminated | Eliminated (Week 5) |
| Jackie Foster | Not Chosen | Safe | Safe | Safe | Safe | Eliminated | Eliminated (Week 5) |
| Rayshun LaMarr | Not Chosen | Safe | Safe | Safe | Safe | Eliminated | Eliminated (Week 5) |
| Christiana Danielle | Not Chosen | Safe | Safe | Safe | Eliminated | Eliminated (Week 4) | |
| Jackie Verna | Not Chosen | Safe | Safe | Safe | Eliminated | Eliminated (Week 4) | |
| Sharane Calister | Safe | Immune | Safe | Eliminated | Eliminated (Week 3) | | |
| D.R. King | Not Chosen | Safe | Eliminated | Eliminated (Week 2) | | | |
| Alexa Cappelli | Not Chosen | Eliminated | Eliminated (Week 1) | | | | |
| Austin Giorgio | Not Chosen | Eliminated | Eliminated (Week 1) | | | | |
| Drew Cole | Not Chosen | Eliminated | Eliminated (Week 1) | | | | |
| Dylan Hartigan | Not Chosen | Eliminated | Eliminated (Week 1) | | | | |
| Gary Edwards | Not Chosen | Eliminated | Eliminated (Week 1) | | | | |
| Johnny Bliss | Not Chosen | Eliminated | Eliminated (Week 1) | | | | |
| Kelsea Johnson | Not Chosen | Eliminated | Eliminated (Week 1) | | | | |
| Mia Boostrom | Not Chosen | Eliminated | Eliminated (Week 1) | | | | |
| Reid Umstattd | Not Chosen | Eliminated | Eliminated (Week 1) | | | | |
| Terrence Cunningham | Not Chosen | Eliminated | Eliminated (Week 1) | | | | |
| Tish Haynes Keys | Not Chosen | Eliminated | Eliminated (Week 1) | | | | |
| WILKES | Not Chosen | Eliminated | Eliminated (Week 1) | | | | |

=== Teams ===
| Artist | Week 1 Playoffs | | Week 2 | Week 3 | Week 4 | Week 5 | Week 6 Finale |
| Artist | Round 1 | Round 2 | Week 2 | Week 3 | Week 4 | Week 5 | Week 6 Finale |
|---|---|---|---|---|---|---|---|
| Rayshun LaMarr | Not Chosen | Public's choice | Advanced | Advanced | Advanced | Eliminated | |
| Jackie Verna | Not Chosen | Coach's Choice | Advanced | Advanced | Eliminated | | |
| Sharane Calister | Public's Choice | Immune | Advanced | Eliminated | | | |
| Mia Boostrom | Not Chosen | Eliminated | | | | | |
| Drew Cole | Not Chosen | Eliminated | | | | | |
| Reid Umstattd | Not Chosen | Eliminated | | | | | |
| Britton Buchanan | Public's Choice | Immune | Advanced | Advanced | Advanced | Advanced | Runner-up |
| Jackie Foster | Not Chosen | Public's choice | Advanced | Advanced | Advanced | Eliminated | |
| Christiana Danielle | Not Chosen | Coach's Choice | Advanced | Advanced | Eliminated | | |
| Johnny Bliss | Not Chosen | Eliminated | | | | | |
| Terrence Cunningham | Not Chosen | Eliminated | | | | | |
| Kelsea Johnson | Not Chosen | Eliminated | | | | | |
| Brynn Cartelli | Public's Choice | Immune | Advanced | Advanced | Advanced | Advanced | Winner |
| Kaleb Lee | Not Chosen | Public's choice | Advanced | Advanced | Advanced | Eliminated | |
| D.R. King | Not Chosen | Coach's Choice | Eliminated | | | | |
| Alexa Cappelli | Not Chosen | Eliminated | | | | | |
| Dylan Hartigan | Not Chosen | Eliminated | | | | | |
| Tish Haynes Keys | Not Chosen | Eliminated | | | | | |
| Kyla Jade | Public's Choice | Immune | Advanced | Advanced | Advanced | Advanced | Third place |
| Spensha Baker | Not Chosen | Coach's choice | Advanced | Advanced | Advanced | Advanced | Fourth place |
| Pryor Baird | Not Chosen | Public's choice | Advanced | Advanced | Advanced | Eliminated | |
| Gary Edwards | Not Chosen | Eliminated | | | | | |
| Austin Giorgio | Not Chosen | Eliminated | | | | | |
| WILKES | Not Chosen | Eliminated | | | | | |

| Rank | Coach | Top 12 | Top 11 | Top 10 | Top 8 | Top 6 | Top 4 |
|---|---|---|---|---|---|---|---|
| 1 | Kelly Clarkson | 3 | 2 | 2 | 2 | 2 | 1 |
| 2 | Alicia Keys | 3 | 3 | 3 | 2 | 1 | 1 |
| 3 | Blake Shelton | 3 | 3 | 3 | 3 | 3 | 2 |
| 4 | Adam Levine | 3 | 3 | 2 | 1 | 0 | 0 |

== Ratings ==
| Episode | | Original airdate | Production | Time slot (ET) | Viewers (in millions) | Adults (18–49) | | Source |
| Episode | | Original airdate | Production | Time slot (ET) | Viewers (in millions) | Rating | Share | Source |
|---|---|---|---|---|---|---|---|---|
| 1 | "The Blind Auditions Premiere, Part 1" | February 26, 2018 | 1401 | Monday 8:00 p.m. | 12.31 | 2.8 | 10 | |
| 2 | "The Blind Auditions Premiere, Part 2" | February 27, 2018 | 1402 | Tuesday 8:00 p.m. | 10.84 | 2.4 | 9 | |
| 3 | "The Blind Auditions, Part 3" | March 5, 2018 | 1403 | Monday 8:00 p.m. | 11.62 | 2.5 | 9 | |
| 4 | "The Blind Auditions, Part 4" | March 6, 2018 | 1404 | Tuesday 8:00 p.m. | 10.09 | 2.1 | 8 | |
| 5 | "The Blind Auditions, Part 5" | March 12, 2018 | 1405 | Monday 8:00 p.m. | 11.87 | 2.4 | 9 | |
| 6 | "The Blind Auditions, Part 6" | March 13, 2018 | 1406 | Tuesday 8:00 p.m. | 11.17 | 2.3 | 9 | |
| 7 | "The Battles Premiere, Part 1" | March 19, 2018 | 1407 | Monday 8:00 p.m. | 11.83 | 2.4 | 9 | |
| 8 | "The Battles Premiere, Part 2" | March 20, 2018 | 1408 | Tuesday 8:00 p.m. | 10.96 | 2.2 | 9 | |
| 9 | "The Battles, Part 3" | March 26, 2018 | 1409 | Monday 8:00 p.m. | 10.37 | 2.0 | 8 | |
| 10 | "The Battles, Part 4" | March 27, 2018 | 1410 | Tuesday 8:00 p.m. | 9.02 | 1.7 | 7 | |
| 11 | "Best of Blinds & Battles" | March 28, 2018 | 1411 | Wednesday 8:00 p.m. | 6.95 | 1.3 | 5 | |
| 12 | "The Knockouts Premiere, Part 1" | April 2, 2018 | 1412 | Monday 8:00 p.m. | 10.03 | 1.9 | 7 | |
| 13 | "The Knockouts Premiere, Part 2" | April 3, 2018 | 1413 | Tuesday 8:00 p.m. | 9.43 | 1.8 | 7 | |
| 14 | "The Knockouts, Part 3" | April 9, 2018 | 1414 | Monday 8:00 p.m. | 9.86 | 1.9 | 7 | |
| 15 | "The Road To The Lives" | April 10, 2018 | 1415 | Tuesday 8:00 p.m. | 7.82 | 1.3 | 5 | |
| 16 | "The Live Playoffs, Night 1" | April 16, 2018 | 1416 | Monday 8:00 p.m. | 9.35 | 1.8 | 7 | |
| 17 | "The Live Playoffs, Night 2" | April 17, 2018 | 1417 | Tuesday 8:00 p.m. | 8.35 | 1.5 | 6 | |
| 18 | "The Live Playoffs, Night 3" | April 18, 2018 | 1418 | Wednesday 8:00 p.m. | 8.38 | 1.5 | 6 | |
| 19 | "Live Top 12 Performance" | April 23, 2018 | 1419 | Monday 8:00 p.m. | 8.43 | 1.5 | 6 | |
| 20 | "Live Top 12 Results" | April 24, 2018 | 1420 | Tuesday 8:00 p.m. | 9.26 | 1.6 | 6 | |
| 21 | "Live Top 11 Performance" | April 30, 2018 | 1421 | Monday 8:00 p.m. | 8.82 | 1.7 | 6 | |
| 22 | "Live Top 11 Results" | May 1, 2018 | 1422 | Tuesday 8:00 p.m. | 7.64 | 1.2 | 5 | |
| 23 | "Live Top 10 Performance" | May 7, 2018 | 1423 | Monday 8:00 p.m. | 8.38 | 1.5 | 6 | |
| 24 | "Live Top 10 Results" | May 8, 2018 | 1424 | Tuesday 8:00 p.m. | 7.26 | 1.3 | 5 | |
| 25 | "Live Top 8 Semifinals Performance" | May 14, 2018 | 1425 | Monday 8:00 p.m. | 8.71 | 1.6 | 6 | |
| 26 | "Live Top 8 Semifinals Results" | May 15, 2018 | 1426 | Tuesday 8:00 p.m. | 8.15 | 1.4 | 6 | |
| 27 | "Live Finale Performance" | May 21, 2018 | 1427 | Monday 8:00 p.m. | 8.67 | 1.5 | 6 | |
| 28 | "Live Finale Results" | May 22, 2018 | 1428 | Tuesday 9:00 p.m. | 8.77 | 1.5 | 6 | |
