= Walk My Way =

Single by Brynn Cartelli
- Released: May 21, 2018
- Genre: Pop
- Length: 3:46
- Label: Republic
- Songwriter(s): Julia Michaels; Justin Tranter; Nicholas Monson
- Producer(s): Jesse Shatkin

Brynn Cartelli singles chronology
"Walk My Way" (2018)	"Last Night's Mascara" (2018)

"Walk My Way" is a song by American pop singer Brynn Cartelli. It is Cartelli's coronation single following her victory on the 14th season of the singing competition The Voice. It was written by Julia Michaels, Justin Tranter, and Nicolas Monson, and produced by Jesse Shatkin.

== Music video ==
The music video for the single was released on November 20, 2018.

== Live performances ==
Cartelli performed the song during the 92nd Annual Macy's Thanksgiving Day Parade on November 22, 2018. Kelly Clarkson claimed on her Instagram that the vocals were live rather than lip synced.

== Charts ==
Chart (2018)	Peak position
US Digital Songs	8
