= Alexa Cappelli =

American singer-songwriter

- Born: August 9, 1999 (age 27); Upland, California
- Genre: Pop music
- Years active: 2019–present
- Label: Arista Records
- Website: alexacappelli.com

Alexa Cappelli (born August 9, 1999) is an American singer-songwriter. She competed on season 14 of The Voice and finished in the top 24.

== Life and career ==
=== Early life and education ===
Alexa Cappelli was born and raised in Upland, California, by Tony and Sandy Cappelli. She has a twin brother, Nick, and a brother who died in 2002 at 32 months due to hypoplastic left heart syndrome. She began voice lessons through her church at age seven and won a local singing competition when she was 12 years old. Following this win, she took pursuing music seriously and started singing in church, musical theater shows, and local shops and venues. She also performed at fundraisers for her parents' charity, Steven's Hope for Children, which was started in honor of her late brother. For high school, she attended Orange County School of The Arts, where she studied commercial music and developed an interest in songwriting.

=== The Voice ===
At age 18, Cappelli tried out for season 14 of The Voice with "I've Got the Music in Me" by The Kiki Dee Band, impressing all four judges and inspiring Kelly Clarkson and Adam Levine to turn their chairs. After her blind audition, Cappelli informed the judges that she tried out for her high school with Clarkson's "People Like Us", prompting Clarkson to ask her to sing the song. Clarkson sang along, to which Cappelli later admitted that she was oblivious: "When you’re up there, you’re in the moment and you don’t hear the noise." Cappelli decided to become Team Kelly.

Cappelli automatically advanced to the knockout round after her battle partner, Hannah Goebel, dropped out of the show. For the knockout round, Cappelli performed "Goodbye Yellow Brick Road" by Elton John, persuading Clarkson to advance Cappelli to the top 24 over Jorge Eduardo. Clarkson cited Cappelli's choice to sing a "crazy, hard melody" as what swayed her decision.

During the live playoffs, Cappelli sang "It Hurts So Bad" by Susan Tedeschi and "Stop and Stare" by OneRepublic. Clarkson chose D.R. King to advance to the top 12, eliminating Cappelli.

=== Career after The Voice ===
Following her stint on The Voice, Cappelli enrolled in college and released her first EP, The Colors That Make You, in August 2019. During the 2020 COVID-19 pandemic, she decided to drop out of college and pursue music full time. Her subsequent singles, "Forbidden" and "Say Something", gained traction on TikTok.

On February 22, 2022, Cappelli released her second EP, Confused @ 22. The EP purposely pivoted away from love songs, instead focusing on internal dialogue and the complexities of the era. A couple months later, Cappelli signed to Arista Records and released "Could've Just Left Me Alone". The song garnered 15 million streams within its first few months and peaked at number 98 on iTunes. Cappelli followed up this release with a series of singles, including "Temporary" and "Someone Better".

In early 2024, Cappelli took a hiatus from social media, returning on July 18, 2024, to announce the release of "Good Riddance". She cited leaving her label, moving three times, and "relearning how to trust" herself as the reasons for her hiatus. "Good Riddance" was the first single off her EP The Process of Elimination, released on October 4, 2024. To promote the EP, she opened for Jessia's Be Here Now Tour in fall 2024.

== Discography ==
=== Studio albums ===
List of studio albums, with selected details
Title	Details
Fairytales & Fallacies	Released: 2026; Label: Independent; Format: Digital download, streaming

=== Extended plays ===
List of extended plays, with selected details
Title	Details
The Colors That Make You	Released: August 30, 2019; Label: Independent; Format: Digital download, streaming
Confused @ 22	Released: February 22, 2022; Label: Independent; Format: Digital download, streaming
The Process of Elimination	Released: 4 October 2024; Label: Independent; Format: Digital download, streaming

=== Singles ===
==== As lead artist ====
List of singles as lead artist, with selected chart positions and certifications, showing year released and album name
Title	Year	Peak chart positions	Album
Title	Year	US	Album
"Forbidden"	2020	–	Non-album singles
"Stuck In The Moment"	2020	–	Non-album singles
"I’ll Be Okay"	2020	–	Non-album singles
"Just Tell Me"	2020	–	Non-album singles
"Can I Come Over?"	2021	–	Non-album singles
"Say Something"	2021	–	Confused @ 22
"Whiplash"	2021	–	Confused @ 22
"Body Language"	2022	–	Confused @ 22
"Could’ve Just Left Me Alone"	2022	–	Non-album singles
"Temporary"	2022	–	Non-album singles
"Last Christmas"	2022	–	Non-album singles
"Lose Lose"	2022	–	Non-album singles
"Someone Better"	2023	–	Non-album singles
"Backwards" (featuring Knox)	2023	–	Non-album singles
"Good Riddance"	2024	–	The Process of Elimination
"Eyes For Me"	2024	–	The Process of Elimination
"Anymore"	2024	–	The Process of Elimination
"Good To Know"	2024	–	The Process of Elimination
"Crimes"	2025	–	Fairytales & Fallacies
"I Said What I Said"	2025	–	Fairytales & Fallacies
"Mirror Mirror"	2025	–	Fairytales & Fallacies
"No Happy End"	2025	–	Fairytales & Fallacies
"Oblivious"	2026	–	Fairytales & Fallacies
"Oopsie Daisy"	2026	–	Fairytales & Fallacies
"—" denotes recording that did not chart in that territory.

==== As featured artist ====
List of singles as lead artist, with selected chart positions and certifications, showing year released and album name
Title	Year	Peak chart positions	Album
Title	Year	US	Album
"Red Couch" (Chris Sails featuring Alexa Cappelli)	2025	–	Non-album singles
"Take It As A Blessing" (Jordana Bryant featuring Alexa Cappelli)	2025	–	Non-album singles
"—" denotes recording that did not chart in that territory.

== Tours ==
Opening act

- Jessia - Be Here Now Tour (2024)
- Vaultboy - Are You Ever Coming Back? Tour (2026)
- Avery Cochrane - Weapons of Iridescence Tour (2026)
