= Brynn Cartelli =

American singer (born 2003)

- Cartelli in 2024

Background information
- Born: April 16, 2003 (age 23); Longmeadow, Massachusetts, U.S.
- Genre: Pop
- Occupations: Singer; songwriter
- Instruments: Vocals; piano; guitar
- Years active: 2018–present
- Labels: Republic; Atlantic; Elektra
- Website: brynncartelli.com

Brynn Cartelli (born April 16, 2003) is an American pop singer. She is the winner of season 14 of the American talent competition The Voice. At the age of 15, she became the youngest person in the show's history to win the competition. She competed on the team coached by Kelly Clarkson, giving her first win as a coach on the show. She released her debut album, Out of the Blue, in 2024.

== Early life ==
Cartelli was born in Longmeadow, Massachusetts. She began playing piano when she was five and it was her parents who introduced her to classical, country and soul music. In middle school she started taking voice lessons and took up the guitar.

In the summer of 2016, Cartelli was performing at a restaurant on Jetties Beach in Nantucket with a local islander when a bartender posted a video of her playing to Facebook. The clip eventually received tens of thousands of views, including from the producers with The Voice. They contacted her and asked if she would come to New York for a private audition. She flew to Los Angeles after getting through the first cut to audition in front of the show's producers. She beat out over a hundred other contestants to earn a blind audition in front of the four celebrity judges, but wasn't picked for that season's show. The producers called her back a week later and said they wanted her to try out for the following season. It was during this audition that she turned two chairs and wound up choosing Kelly Clarkson as her coach for the rest of the season.

== Career ==
=== The Voice (2018) ===
Cartelli auditioned for the 14th season of The Voice in 2018. For her blind audition, she sang "Beneath Your Beautiful" by Labrinth and Emeli Sandé. Two of the four coaches, Kelly Clarkson and Blake Shelton, turned their chairs for her. She chose to be part of Team Kelly.

Over the course of the competition, Cartelli continued to showcase her vocal ability. It was often noted that the coaches believed that her voice was powerful and mature despite her young age. She competed against Dylan Hartigan in the Battle rounds as the two sang "...Ready for It?" by Taylor Swift. Clarkson deemed her the winner and advanced her to the Knockout rounds. In the Knockouts, she then defeated fellow team member Jamella with her rendition of "Here Comes Goodbye" by Rascal Flatts, and advanced to the Live Shows.

On the first night of the Live Playoffs, Cartelli performed the song "Unstoppable" by Sia. The public voted her straight through to the Top 12 week, sparing her a second performance that week. Cartelli continued advancing throughout the Live Shows. Her performances included covers of "Up to the Mountain" by Patty Griffin in the Top 12 week, "Yoü and I" by Lady Gaga in the Top 11 week, "Fix You" by Coldplay in the Top 10 week, and "What the World Needs Now is Love" by Jackie DeShannon in the Semi-Finals week. The latter two songs charted in the Top 10 of iTunes, giving Cartelli a download bonus multiplier for each performance.

During the Live Finale on May 21, 2018, Cartelli joined her coach, Clarkson, in a duet as they sang "Don't Dream It's Over" by Crowded House. She then performed her original "Walk My Way", and closed the night with Adele's "Skyfall". At the end of the night, Cartelli was named the winner of Season 14 of The Voice, becoming the youngest contestant to win the show. She received a prize of $100,000 and a record deal with Republic Records.

==== The Voice performances ====
– Studio version of performance reached the top 10 on iTunes

Stage	Song	Original Artist	Date	Order	Result
Blind Auditions	"Beneath Your Beautiful"	Labrinth	Feb. 26, 2018	1.2	2 chairs turned Joined Team Kelly
Battle Rounds (Top 48)	"...Ready for It?" (vs. Dylan Hartigan)	Taylor Swift	March 19, 2018	7.2	Saved by Kelly
Knockout Rounds (Top 32)	"Here Comes Goodbye" (vs. Jamella)	Rascal Flatts	April 3, 2018	13.1	Saved by Kelly
Live Playoffs (Top 24)	"Unstoppable"	Sia	April 16, 2018	16.4	Saved by Public Vote
Live Top 12	"Up to the Mountain"	Patty Griffin	April 23, 2018	19.9	Saved by Public Vote
Live Top 11	"You and I"	Lady Gaga	April 30, 2018	21.8	Saved by Public Vote
Live Top 10	"Fix You"	Coldplay	May 7, 2018	23.10	Saved by Public Vote
Live Semi-Finals (Top 8)	"What the World Needs Now Is Love"	Jackie DeShannon	May 14, 2018	25.1	Saved by Public Vote
Live Semi-Finals (Top 8)	"FourFiveSeconds" / "You Can't Always Get What You Want " (with Britton Buchanan)	Rihanna / The Rolling Stones	May 14, 2018	25.8	Saved by Public Vote
Live Finale (Final 4)	"Don't Dream It's Over" (with Kelly Clarkson)	Crowded House	May 21, 2018	27.3	Winner
Live Finale (Final 4)	"Walk My Way" (original song)	Brynn Cartelli	May 21, 2018	27.8	Winner
Live Finale (Final 4)	"Skyfall"	Adele	May 21, 2018	27.12	Winner

=== After The Voice ===
After winning The Voice, Cartelli signed with Brandon Blackstock, Clarkson's then-husband and manager, and manager to Blake Shelton. Cartelli signed with Atlantic Records in December 2018. Cartelli opened up for Clarkson on her Meaning of Life Tour, which began on January 24, 2019.

Cartelli has also returned to The Voice several times. The first visit was during the blind auditions of the fifteenth season, when she simply visited several of the artists hoping to audition for the show. The second was during that season's finale, when she performed her new original single, "Last Night's Mascara". The third was during the results show of the first week of the sixteenth season's Live Cross-Battles, when she performed another new original single of hers called "Grow Young".

On March 19, 2021, Cartelli released the single, "Long Way Home" (co-written with Nathan Chapman), and on April 30, 2021, she released her next single "If I Could" (written with Ben Abraham). The song has over 14 million streams on Spotify. With the release of the two singles she announced on Instagram her debut EP, Based on a True Story, which was released on May 28, 2021. It debuted at number nine on the iTunes Charts. The EP has gained over 25 million streams on Spotify.

Following the success of her EP, Cartelli released her single "Gemini," on May 20, 2022. Following this, Cartelli released singles "Girl Code," "Convertible in the Rain," "Secondhand Smoke" (followed by an acoustic version), and "Lucky to Love You" in preparation for her first album.

In January 2024, Cartelli released her next single "Boy From Home" and announced her upcoming debut album, Out of the Blue. Following the album's release on March 1, 2024, Cartelli made appearances on the Today Show and MTV to promote the album.

== Discography ==
=== Singles ===
Single	Year	Peak chart positions	Album
Single	Year	US Digital	Album
"Walk My Way"	2018	3	The Complete Season 14 Collection (The Voice Performance)
"Last Night's Mascara"	2018	19	Non-album singles
"Grow Young"	2019	–	Non-album singles
"Have Yourself a Merry Little Christmas"	2019	–	Non-album singles
"Long Way Home"	2021	–	Based on a True Story
"If I Could"	2021	–	Based on a True Story
"Gemini"	2022	–	Out of the Blue
"Girl Code"	2022	–	Out of the Blue
"Convertible In The Rain"	2022	–	Out of the Blue
"Secondhand Smoke"	2023	–	Out of the Blue
"Lucky to Love You"	2023	–	Out of the Blue
"Boy From Home"	2024	–	Out of the Blue

=== EPs ===
EP	Year	Peak chart positions: iTunes Album Chart
Based on a True Story	2021	7

=== Albums ===
Album	Year	Peak chart positions: iTunes Pop Album Chart
Out of the Blue	2024	8

== Awards and nominations ==
Year	Ceremony	Category	Nominated work	Result	Ref
2018	People's Choice Awards	Competition Contestant of 2018	Winner of The Voice – Season 14	Nominated	
2018	Talent Recap Fan Choice Awards	Favorite Talent Show Winner	The Voice	Nominated	

== Tours ==
Supporting

- Meaning of Life Tour (2019) (with Kelly Clarkson)
- Red Pill Blues Tour (2019) (with Maroon 5, one show)
- Never Ending Summer Tour (2022) (with OneRepublic)

Awards and achievements
Preceded by Chloe Kohanski	The Voice (American); Winner; 2018 (Spring)	Succeeded by Chevel Shepherd
Preceded by "Wish I Didn't Love You"	The Voice (American); Winner's song "Walk My Way"; 2018 (Spring)	Succeeded by "Broken Hearts"
